= Unitel La Paz =

- La Paz; Bolivia
- City: La Paz
- Channels: Digital: 28; Virtual: 2.1
- Branding: Unitel La Paz

Programming
- Affiliations: 2.1: Unitel

Ownership
- Owner: Grupo Monasterios (Empresa de Comunicaciones del Oriente Ltda. Ecor Ltda)

History
- Founded: November 1985
- First air date: November 23, 1985
- Former channel number: Analog: 2 (VHF, 1985-2026)
- Former affiliations: Telesistema Boliviano (1985-1996); Bolivisión (1996-1997)

Technical information
- Licensing authority: ATT

Unitel La Paz is the Unitel owned-and-operated station for the city of La Paz, capital of Bolivia. The station was the generating station of the former Telesistema Boliviano network, disbanded in the late 90s. The station is available nationwide on Inter Satelital, alongside the Santa Cruz station.

== History ==
Telesistema Boliviano (TSB), the initial licensee, was founded on November 22, 1983, as the first commercial television company in Bolivia, granting the license to operate in La Paz on channel 2. The channel was the opposite of ATB (channel 9) in some way, as the channel provided "quality programming" over political preferences.

Experimental broadcasts started on February 12, 1985, before becoming regular on April 14, 1985, being owned by Antonio Maldonado. On weekdays the channel broadcast for seventeen hours on average (7am to 12am) and twelve on weekends (11am to 11pm). The station's owner was Antonio Maldonado, while its administration was up to brothers Ángel Carlos and Rosa Virgilia Cardona, owners of the Perspectiva magazine. With its transmitter located at Sopocachi, it captured signals from foreign television stations, mainly news and key sporting events.

In the early 90s, its local newscast was presented by priest Eduardo Pérez, who left the station in 1994 to concentrate on a radio career. At the time, Juan Pablo Guzmán was the head of its news division, and Pérez during his stay with TSB appeared in a soccer uniform to present the sports segment and attached to a noose in order to protest a gag rule to an extent where he started to suffer from asphyxiation.

With the dissolution of TSB, the station briefly became a part of the newly-formed Bolivisión network, alongside Galavisión and Antena Uno, Bolivisión later bought the license to broadcast on channel 5. After the rift that led to the creation of the Unitel network, the legal entity behind channel 2 in La Paz was, as late as 2002, still granted to Telesistema Boliviano. The station was now aligned to the Monasterios in June 1997 and started airing a new national newscast, TV Noticias, which was renamed Telepaís after the staff from the network's head in Santa Cruz became aware that there already was a TV Noticias on channel 24 in La Paz since early in the year.

The station's relay in El Alto was heavily damaged in November 2019.

== Technical information ==
Virtual	Physical	Screen	Content
2.1	28 UHF	1080i	Unitel

Unitel La Paz started its HD signal in 2018. Cadena A used to be carried on subchannel 2.2 until November 13, 2025, when it obtained its own multiplex and PSIP (3.1).
