= ATB Radio =

Bolivian radio station

- Bolivia
- Frequencies: 107.2 MHz (La Paz); 89.2 MHz (Cochabamba)

Programming
- Language: Spanish
- Affiliations: ATBMedia

History
- First air date: September 24, 2004

Links
- Website: https://atb.com.bo/atbradio/

ATB Radio is a Bolivian radio station and a sister outlet to the television network of the same name, owned by ATBMedia and licensed to Illimani de Comunicaciones, S.A.. The station was founded as Radio Pasión Boliviana on September 24, 2004, and was subsequently acquired by Investbol (then-owner of ATB), which acquired it and other stations across Bolivia.

ATB Radio is a generalist network, whose programming largely consists of news, events and sports broadcasts, as well as programs which are (mostly) produced from the network's flagship in La Paz.

== History ==
=== Background (2000-2009) ===
Grupo Garafulic (owner at the time of ATB, as well as newspapers La Razón, El Nuevo Día and Extra) obtained a new shareholder when Televisa sold its 25% share in Bolivia to Grupo PRISA. The transaction was completed on October 23, 2000, for a total sum of over US$10 million and aimed at creating three radio networks, owned by Inversiones en Radiodifusión S.A. (IRD).

The plans to introduce IRD's radio stations were not accomplished due to factors such as the death of (president of IRD and founder of ATB), the legal dispute between Grupo Garafulic and PRISA, and the surprising rise of Unitel in ratings. In its brief administration, Ernesto Asbún (owner of Bolivisión) acquired, in 2004, 25% of Illimani de Comunicaciones, with IRD (divided between 40% to the Garafulic family and the remaining 60% to prisa PRISA), obtaining the remaining 75%. This meant that ATB briefly shared owners with Radio Cadena Nacional (now RQP) between 2004 and 2009, before PRISA divested from Bolivia.

=== As Radio Wara/Radio Cosmos (1937-2004) ===
It is known that before the creation of Radio Pasión Boliviana and the later establishment of the ATB Radio network, FM 107.3 in La Paz was occupied by Radio Wara, later renamed Radio Cosmos; under the latter name, it had no affiliation with the historic AM station in Cochabamba owned by Laureano Rojas, only sharing the name. Not much is known about Radio Cosmos, aside from being founded in 1937 under the callsign CP-34, together with "Radio El Condor", with a power of 200 Watts at launching time.

=== As Radio Pasión Boliviana, 107.3 FM (2004-2014) ===
Radio Pasión Boliviana 107.3 FM was founded on August 20, 2004, by journalist and radio presenter Napoleón Goméz, in association with Adolfo Paco, formerly of RTP and CONDEPA. Radio Pasión Boliviana emerged mainly with the goal of "entertaining, educating and delivering national and folk music", as well as giving airtime to several artists and presenters. Its coverage was limited to the cities of La Paz, El Alto and Viacha, as well as its internet stream. It officially started broadcasting on September 17, 2004.

Its slogan was la radio de los Records Guinness (the station of the Guinness Records) and was recognized as such due to the fact that, with each anniversary, Goméz often broke a Guinness World Record with a number of participants. Among them was the Guinness record of the zampoña with 2,317 musicians in 2004; 3,000 caporales in 2005; the Guinness Record obtained in Oruro gathering 1,166 trumpetists in 2009; that of the world's largest human heart, with 8,506 participants in 2010; the world carporal show, with 20,000 dancers from eighteen countries, and the world tinkus show, with 18,000 dancers from sixteen countries.

In addition to folk music, Pasión Boliviana had several programs throughout its existence, such as Las noches más románticas with Napoleón Goméz, La Justa with Justa Canaviri, Al Islam, the miniseries Z in radio format, Radio Revista with Lizeth Claros, and others. On the other hand, Goméz often programmed radio concerts and competitions each year, with each anniversary.

==== Shutdown of Pasión Boliviana and CICOMBOL (2013-2014) ====
In November 2013, Jaime Iturri (at the time, general manager of ATB) announced the launch of its radio station alongside Grupo Arévalo, who owned stations Monumental y Mundial and produced Deporte Total for ATB. Its launch date was initially scheduled for January 4, 2014 and was directed by Claudio Zambrana, radio announcer and official voice of the TV network. As part of the agreement, Monumental, Mundial and ATB acquired the radio rights to the 2014 FIFA World Cup. Although ATB had acquired the exclusive rights, it did not set up negotiations to acquire a station in La Paz.

After the announcement of the launch of ATB Radio, the closure of Radio Pasión Boliviana was imminent. As part of a restructuring of the FM frequency plan at a national scale, the Telecommunications and Transport Regulation and Oversight Authority (ATT) ordered Pasión Boliviana to change its frequency, from 107.3 FM to 107.2 FM, which affected its reception. Finally, on June 4, 2014, ATB Radio formally started broadcasting, days ahead of the start of the World Cup. Radio Pasión Boliviana was not abruptly closed (it even celebrated its tenth anniversary), however, in a transitional manner, most of its programs moved to other stations or were simply cancelled until becoming entirely an ATB radio subsidiary. At the time of its gradual closure, its staff included Irene Pinto, Elizabeth Bustinza, Abigail Mariscal, Micaela Cruz, Raúl Callisaya, Mario Loza, Jesús Millares, Arturo Flores and Juan Pablo Calle.

Quickly, the license was handed over to Circulo de Comunicadores de Música Folclórica y Culturas Bolivianas, CICOMBOL, for which the station briefly became Radio Cicombol, before later recovering the station without success, shortening the name to Radio Pasión (not related to the telenovela of the same name, aired on ATB between 1993 and 1994). Pasión Boliviana still exists as a program, having moved to other stations such as Batallón Colorados 104.8 FM and Aquí La Prensa 91.6 FM.

=== As ATB Radio (2014-present) ===
Since ATB had never operated a radio station before (excluding RCN's brief experience with Bolivisión between 2004 and 2009),it hired Zambrana to consult the TV network in the creation of a national radio network. Its initial name was "ATB Radio, la red" and the agreement with Grupo Arévalo was still valid, where its owner was sportscaster Alfonso "Toto" Arévalo. Around February 15, 2014, it was still doing test broadcasts.

Its creation was not achieved until February 24, 2014, with broadcasts beginning on June 4 of that year, at Iturri's initiative, after obtaining the radio rights to the World Cup and the creation of a multimedia company (which envisioned the conversion of its website into ATB Digital). Its TV counterpart did not obtain the television rights, as they were shared between Red Uno and Bolivia TV, who had negotiated them. Its first programs were radio versionf of ATB Noticias, Anoticiando and Deporte Total (simulcast with Monumental) as well as several programs presented by staff that was already working at ATB.

== Programming ==
- La Red Deportiva: Sports program.
- Tu Mañana: Variety program.
- ATB Noticias: Simulcast of the TV newscasts (La 1.ª de ATB, ATB Noticias, Anoticiando).
- Radioterapia: Musical program.
- Bombo Clap: Urban music program.
- Encanto Boliviano: Program devoted to Bolivian folk music.
- 16 Bist: Geek program.
- Paranormal: Esoteric program.
- Warmis:News program.
- Bitcast: Videogame and music podcast.
- El Poder del Disco: Retro music program (music from the 70s, 80s and 90s).
- Al Son de la Salsa: Music program (salsa, bachata, merengue).

=== Previous programming ===
- 2022 FIFA World Cup (November 20-December 18, 2022)

== Network ==
Since 2014, ATB acquired individual stations to form its network.

| City | Commercial name | Operated by | Frequency |
|---|---|---|---|
| La Paz | ATB Radio | Pasión Boliviana "Radio" | 107.2 FM |
| Cochabamba | ATB Radio | Estación FM Oropeza | 89.2 FM |
| Potosí | ATB Radio | Illimani de Comunicaciones S.A | 93.7 FM |
| Sucre | ATB Radio | Illimani de Comunicaciones S.A | 93.7 FM |
| Oruro | ATB Radio | Illimani de Comunicaciones S.A | 92.5 FM |
| Trinidad | ATB Radio | Illimani de Comunicaciones S.A | 92.5 FM |
| Cobija | ATB Radio | Illimani de Comunicaciones S.A | 92.5 FM |
| Tarija | ATB Radio | Illimani de Comunicaciones S.A | 92.5 FM |
| Guayaramerín | ATB Radio | Illimani de Comunicaciones S.A | 92.3 FM |
| Riberalta | ATB Radio | Illimani de Comunicaciones S.A | 92.3 FM |
| San Borja | ATB Radio | Illimani de Comunicaciones S.A | 92.3 FM |
| Bermejo | ATB Radio | Illimani de Comunicaciones S.A | 92.3 FM |
| Caraparí | ATB Radio | Illimani de Comunicaciones S.A | 92.3 FM |
