= Unitel Oruro =

- Oruro, Oruro; Bolivia
- Channels: Analog: 2
- Branding: Unitel

Programming
- Affiliations: Unitel

Ownership
- Owner: Empresa de Comunicaciones del Oriente; (Televisión Oruro)
- Sister stations: Cadena A, Canal Rural Bolivia

History
- Founded: April 1985
- First air date: November 1, 1985
- Former channel number: Analog: 3 (1985–1988)
- Former affiliations: Telesistema Boliviano (1989-1996); Bolivisión (1996-1997)

Technical information
- Licensing authority: ATT

Unitel Oruro (formerly known as Televisión Oruro) is a Bolivian television station. Owned by Empresa de Comunicaciones del Oriente and operating on channel 2, the station is a Unitel owned-and-operated station.

== History ==
TVO started test broadcasts in April 1985 and began regular broadcasts at 12pm on November 1, 1985, however some sources say the station started earlier, approximately in 1983. In 1988, the station hired Wigerto Salinas as a sports presenter and became an affiliate of Telesistema Boliviano, later joining Bolivisión in 1996.

When the Monasterios acquired half of TSB's La Paz station in June 1997, the Oruro station was included in the deal, becoming a charter Unitel affiliate when the new network launched on July 21. Its director in the 90s was Humberto Cabezas, who oversaw the change of affiliation to Unitel. Well into the early 2000s, Telesistema Boliviano was still the licensee.

On August 5, 2008, its offices were damaged by a youth group connected to Movimiento al Socialismo, causing the local edition of Telepaís to be suspended on September 4, 2008, in order to avoid further confrontations.

In March 2024, Unitel Oruro reporter Carmen Torres has received constant intimidation from local governor Johnny Vedía Rodriguez, due to news reports she directed about governor violence against women.
