= Unitel Trinidad =

TV D&D
- Trinidad, Bolivia; Bolivia
- City: Trinidad
- Channels: Analog: 9 (VHF)
- Branding: TV D&D

Programming
- Affiliations: Unitel

Ownership
- Owner: Compañía Beniana de Comunicaciones Dellien & Dellien

History
- First air date: August 29, 1992
- Former affiliations: Telesistema Boliviano (1992-1996); Bolivisión (1996-1998)

Technical information
- Licensing authority: ATT

Unitel Trinidad (channel 9) is a television station licensed to Trinidad, a city in Beni Department. A Unitel affiliate, the station's name is owned by the Dellien brothers, under Compañía Beniana de Comunicaciones.

== History ==
The station started broadcasting on August 29, 1992. As of 2000, Hugo Dellien Bause, father of tennis player Hugo Dellien, was its manager, the owner, the other Dellien, was Carlos Ernesto Dellien Bause. One of its presenters was José Martín Melgar Zabala, presenter of the local edition of Telepaís, who later moved to Santa Cruz de la Sierra.

Until an unknown date, the station was branded as Megavisión.
