= Chapaca de Televisión =

- Tarija, Tarija; Bolivia
- Channels: Analog: 2
- Branding: Chapaca de Televisión

Programming
- Affiliations: Cadena A

Ownership
- Owner: Canal 2 Chapaca de Televisión (Chapaca de Comunicaciones); (Chapaca de Comunicaciones)

History
- First air date: 1992
- Former affiliations: Bolivisión (1996-1997); Unitel (1997-at least 2010)

Technical information
- Licensing authority: ATT

Chapaca de Televisión (channel 2) is a Cadena A-affiliated television station licensed to Tarija. The station has been operational since 1992 or 1993 (reports vary) and was, in the past, an affiliate of Bolivisión and, later, Unitel.

== History ==
It is unknown when did Chapaca de Televisión commence operations. The station was already operational in 1992, although the 2000 Bolivian Media Guide states that the station was founded on April 17, 1993. By 1997, it had joined the first stint of the Bolivisión network, later, from July 21, 1997, it joined Unitel as a charter affiliate.

It is believed that the station ditched Unitel for Cadena A around 2010; a local newspaper announced that Cadena A's news service Tele A Noticias got a new look in October of that year, implying it was already its affiliate. Unitel moved to channel 29, Global Tarija, branded as Unitel, at an unknown date in the late 2000s.
