= Canal 13 TV Visión =

- Potosí, Bolivia; Bolivia
- City: Potosí
- Channels: Analog: 13 (VHF)
- Branding: Canal 13 TV Visión

Programming
- Affiliations: Unitel

Ownership
- Owner: TV Visión SRL

History
- First air date: July 19, 1992

Technical information
- Licensing authority: ATT

Canal 13 TV Visión is a Unitel-affiliated television station licensed to Potosí, capital of the department of the same name. The station is owned by TV Visión SRL.

== History ==
Canal 13 TV Visión was founded on November 10, 1991, and started broadcasting on July 19, the following year. As of 2000, its director was David Vildoso Villca. By 2002, the station had joined Unitel.

It was one of the stations that received condemnation from the government in December 2005 for airing a political campaign agasint Evo Morales and his political party in Santa Cruz Department.

== Programming ==
The station produces the local editions of La Revista and Telepaís. The latter has its editions at 1:30pm and 8:30pm following the national edition.
