= Unitel Yacuiba =

- Yacuiba, Tarija; Bolivia
- Channels: Analog: 4
- Branding: Unitel

Programming
- Affiliations: Unitel

Ownership
- Owner: Canal 4 N Visión; (Canal 4 N Visión)
- Sister stations: Cadena A Canal Rural Bolivia

Technical information
- Licensing authority: ATT

Canal 4 N Visión, doing business as Unitel Yacuiba is a Bolivian television station and the Unitel affiliate for the city of Yacuiba in southern Bolivia.

== History ==
It is unknown when did the station start operations; it was already operational as early as the late 90s. In 2002, the station's director was Oscar Roberto Nuñez and was incorrectly attributed to be on channel 4.

On June 23, 2008, following a referendum in the department of Tarija, the station's building was targeted by miners on strike, launching dynamite to the facilities. In March 2009, Georges Nava Zurita accused unionists and the CIA of the attack on the station. In August 2009, Peter Nava was absolved and police found no evidence that justified the crime.

== Programming ==
The station produces local segments of La Revista and Telepaís, as well as a local sports program, Líderes del Deporte. All of these programs are shown on weekdays.

In 2014, the station produced Conociendo mi Pago, a cultural program, on Saturdays in the 6pm slot.
