= Bolivisión Santa Cruz =

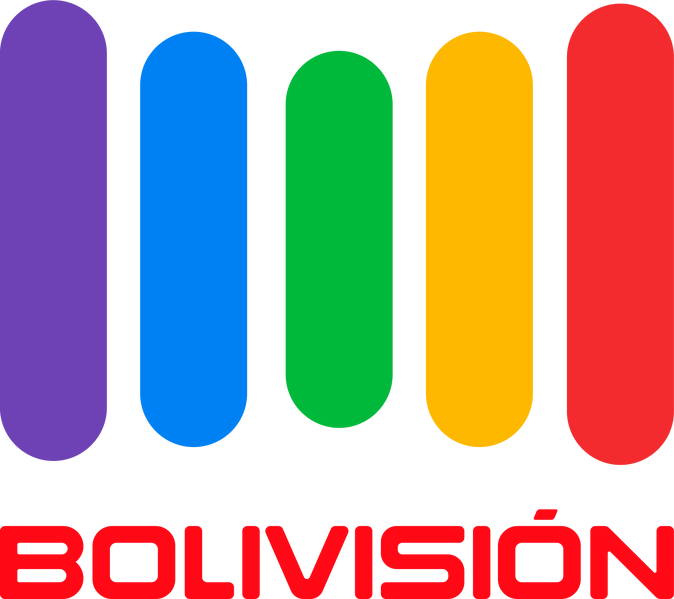
- Santa Cruz de la Sierra; Bolivia
- City: Santa Cruz de la Sierra
- Channels: Digital: 28; Virtual: 4.1
- Branding: Bolivisión Santa Cruz

Programming
- Affiliations: 5.1: Bolivisión; 5.2:RQP Bolivia

Ownership
- Owner: Albavisión (Galavisión S.R.L.)

History
- Founded: 1984
- First air date: April 1, 1984
- Former channel number: Analog: 4 (VHF, 1984-2026)
- Former affiliations: Independent (1985-1996); Red CDT-TSB (1990-1995)

Technical information
- Licensing authority: ATT

Bolivisión Santa Cruz is a Bolivian television station licensed to Santa Cruz de la Sierra. Operating on VHF channel 4 (digital channel 28, PSIP 4.1), it is both an owned-and-operated station and the flagship station of Bolivisión, a network owned by Albavisión, in turn owned by Remigio Ángel González. The licensee for the department operates under the name of Galavisión S.R.L., which also oversees two relay stations in Montero on channel 3 and Warnes on channel 33.

== History ==
Galavisión started broadcasting on channel 4 in 1984; like most of the early private television stations, it relied heavily on piracy of foreign content, canned, with its audience preferring entertainment and mainly seen as elitist. During the 1980s, the station had Gloria Morales, who moved from Cruceña de Televisión, as its announcer. In the mid-90s, the station produced a variety show called Garabato, as well as TV movies and dramas produced by Safipro. Station journalist Miguel Vásquez Ribera died of suicide on September 3, 1995.

In 1996-1997, due to a rift that dissolved Telesistema Boliviano and CDT, as well as ECOR's acquisition of channel 9, the station was sold to Ernesto Asbún, owner of Antena Uno in Cochabamba. Following the acquisition of several other stations (América TV, channel 6, moved to channel 5) and a handful of other stations, Bolivisión was created. At the end of May 2007, weeks after Remigio Ángel González bought the network, he visited its facilities in a two-leg tour of Bolivia. The takeover by Albavisión also led to a reduction in the number of locally made programming, and was accused of centricism over the west of the country, especially the national capital, La Paz.

In July 2010, following the collapse of its transmitter and damages to its equipment, production was relocated to La Paz. Its commercial and administrative functions were still operational. Talks of building a new local studio were underway in February 2015. It resumed local production in June 2015, with the introduction of new studios and an HD-ready transmitter.

== Technical information ==
Bolivisión Santa Cruz started digital terrestrial and, in turn, HD broadcasts in 2018, alongside its sister O&O stations in the trunk axis (La Paz and Cochabamba). The station is expected to shut down its analog signal on May 30, 2026.
