= Asociación Boliviana de Canales =

Defunct Bolivian television network

- Country: Bolivia

Programming
- Language: Spanish
- Picture format: 480i SDTV

History
- Launched: 1990
- Closed: 1996

Availability

Terrestrial
- Analog VHF: Channel 5 (Santa Cruz); Channel 6 (La Paz)

Asociación Boliviana de Canales (ABC, legal name Cadena ABC de Televisión) was a television network in Bolivia that existed from approximately 1990 to 1996 and was based in the capital, La Paz, owned by Fernando Peláez. The network was dissolved following a crisis in 1996.

== History ==
It is known that the network was formed in 1990, from the association of América Televisión in La Paz (channel 6, where the network was headquartered, also known in its early years as ATC 6) and TV Universo in Santa Cruz (channel 5). These were also joined by Cochabambina de Televisión (channel 9).

Not much information is known about the network, but it entered into a deep crisis in January 1996. Its station in Santa Cruz was affected by a strike as wages for the months of November and December 1995 were not paid and the network executives from La Paz did not arrive. After that, the network was dissolved. ATB, which had lost its affiliation agreement with Teleoriente, took over the Santa Cruz station and Ernesto Asbún took over América Televisión, later renaming it Bolivisión La Paz.
