= ATB Santa Cruz =

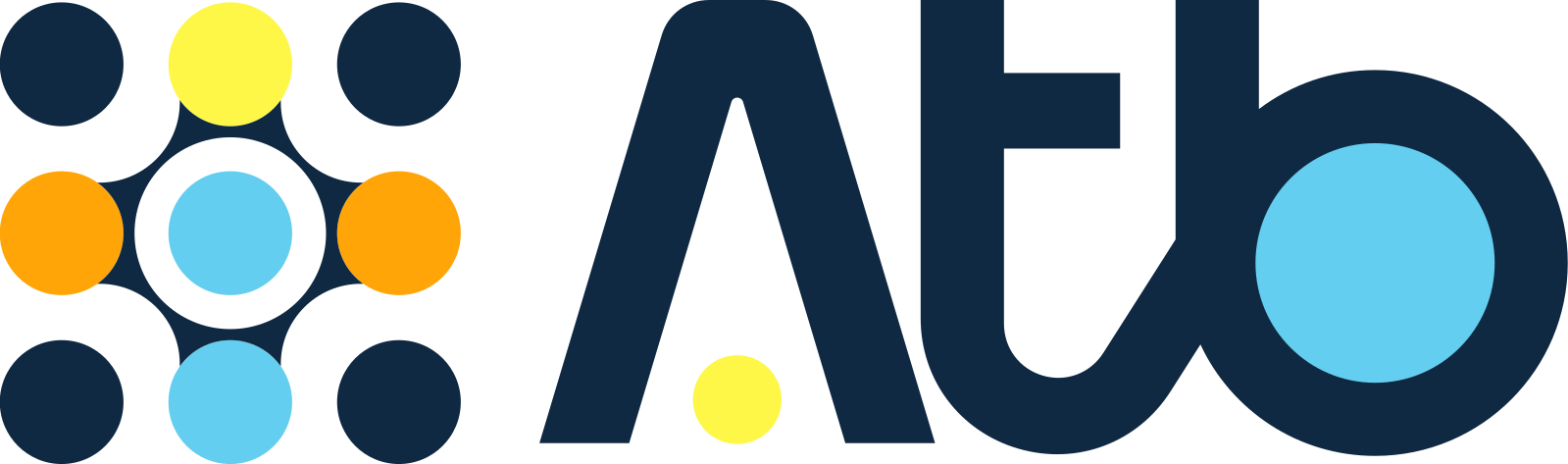
- Santa Cruz de la Sierra; Bolivia
- City: Santa Cruz de la Sierra
- Channels: Digital: 29; Virtual: 5.1
- Branding: ATB Santa Cruz

Programming
- Affiliations: 5.1: ATB; 39.1: CTV Red Nacional

Ownership
- Owner: Illimani de Comunicaciones (ATB Santa Cruz Televisión S.A. )

History
- Founded: 1984
- First air date: April 17, 1984
- Former channel number: Analog: 5 (VHF, 1984–2013; 2018-2026), 39 (UHF, 2013–2018)
- Former affiliations: Independent (1985-1990); Cadena ABC (1990-1995)

Technical information
- Licensing authority: ATT

ATB Santa Cruz (channel 5) is a Red ATB-owned-and-operated station licensed to Santa Cruz de la Sierra, commercial capital of Bolivia. The station started broadcasting in April 1984 as the independent station Universal Richards (later renamed Canal 5 Tele-Sat) and quickly joined the ATB network.

== History ==
Up until 1984, Santa Cruz only had Televisión Boliviana (channel 7) and TVU UAGRM (channel 11). Universal Richards Televisión (channel 5) opened in April 1984 alongside Cruceña de Televisión (channel 13) in April 1984. Universal Richards, also known as Tele-Sat, was primarily aimed at the sale of satellite dishes. In 1986, it was already operating a 24-hour schedule. However, its national programming was scarce: Tele-Sat took programming from channels coming from Mexico, Brazil and Venezuela, which it relayed arbitrarily, totalling 80% of the daily schedule.

The company was also known as TV Universo. Its owners were Roberto and Oliver Richards. At one point, it relayed at least ten hours of Brazilian programming, including commercials and foreign imports whose rights were only valid for Brazil. The companies that held the rights to these titles feared the actions committed by the station, which had worse consequences than the declining attendance at movie theatres.

After an initial phase as an independent station, the station joined Asociación Boliviana de Canales at an unknown date. In January 1996, the station's staff entered into a state of emergency, after the lack of payments concerning November and December 1995, and the lack of appearance of the network executives from La Paz. ATB had left Teleoriente and, taking the advantage of the ABC crisis, opted to affiliate with channel 5 upon the closure of the network.

Digital broadcasts started in 2018.

On April 30, 2025, the station was used as a solution to produce networked programming following the crisis that affected the station in La Paz.
