= Unitel Pando =

- Cobija, Pando; Bolivia
- Channels: Analog: 11
- Branding: Unitel

Programming
- Affiliations: Unitel

Ownership
- Owner: Empersa de Comunicaciones del Oriente; (Universal de Comunicaciones Pando)

History
- Founded: November 1999
- First air date: November 23, 1999

Technical information
- Licensing authority: ATT

Unitel Pando (also known as Unitel Cobija) is a Bolivian television station licensed to Pando, the capital of Cobija Department. Owned by Empresa de Comunicaciones del Oriente and operating on channel 11, as a Unitel owned-and-operated station. The station produces local editions of La Revista and Telepaís.

== History ==
Unitel Pando started broadcasting in November 1999 and has been a Unitel O&O since its launch. As of 2002, the legal representative of the station was Álvaro Pinedo. By 2008, the post was occupied by Podemos deputee Ronald Camargo Suzuki In 2013, Unitel Pando was accused of having advertising contracts with minimal transparency with the regional administration.

In November 2018, the station won the Bruno Racua 2018 award.
