= Radio Televisión Ichilo =

- Yapacaní, Santa Cruz Department; Bolivia
- City: Yapacaní
- Channels: Analog: 13 (VHF)
- Branding: RTI

Programming
- Affiliations: Independent; Unitel (some programs)

Ownership
- Owner: Ichilo Visión Canal 13 VHF

History
- First air date: March 19, 1992

Technical information
- Licensing authority: ATT

Radio Televisión Ichilo is a Bolivian radio and television station licensed to Yapacaní, a city in Santa Cruz Department. The station is owned by Salesian priests; its television station is de facto independent, but relays some programs from Unitel.

== History ==
Radio Ichilo started broadcasting on August 6, 1981, following the installation of a bridge to Yapacaní that helped increase its population (at the time the radio station was founded, its population was of 3,000 inhabitants). The station's transmitter covered a 20-kilometer radius and was installed by Salesian missionaries living in the area. In 1985, its new FM transmission equipment arrived and the station affiliated itself to the Erbol network. At this time, Radio Ichilo acquired Cine Avenida (now Cine Teatro Don Bosco) to use it for educational aims. New equipment arrived on March 15, 1987, from the provisional facilities; the arrival of Arturo Bergamasco in September 1988 led to the replacement of its old equipment by new ones. The administration also brought in television equipment and a satellite dish, eyeing the creation of a television station.

On March 19, 1992, television broadcasts began, becoming RTI. The television station was built with support from Italian Salesian missionaries from Friuli. As of 1993, as profiled in the Friulia-Venezia-Giulia edition of TGR, its television programming consisted largely of news and feature films, as well as soccer matches, especially from Udinese. Beginning in 1993, both the radio and TV station increase their power; the radio station alone having a reach of 100 kilometers. Its radio and television newscasts consolidated and in 1995, the stations were carrying programs on topics such as gender, education, health and state reforms.

In 2004, with the help of Erbol, RTI's first strategic plan is enacted. RTI's facilities were attacked on November 10, 2019, by MAS supporters, in the wake of the crisis generated by the ejection of Evo Morales as president.

== Programming ==
The latest accessible information is from January 2022. The radio station signs on at 4:55am and signs off at 9pm. Most of the programming is local, but there is also some content from EWTN and the Erbol network (the latter being RTI's affiliate). The television station signs on at 5:55am and signs off at 11pm. About half of the programming is locally originated, and it broadcasts an hour of EWTN programming a day. It also carries some programming from the Unitel network, namely La Revista, La Batidora, Telepaís and the primetime telenovelas. A Catholic reflection, Buenas Noches, is broadcast between Telepaís and the telenovelas.
