= Unitel Cochabamba =

- Cochabamba; Bolivia
- City: Cochabamba
- Channels: Digital: 43; Virtual: 13.1
- Branding: Unitel Cochabamba

Programming
- Affiliations: 13.1: Unitel

Ownership
- Owner: Grupo Monasterios (Empresa de Comunicaciones del Oriente Ltda. Ecor Ltda)

History
- Founded: 1984
- First air date: November 1984
- Former channel number: Analog: 13 (VHF, 1984-2026)
- Former affiliations: Independent (1984-1997)

Technical information
- Licensing authority: ATT

Unitel Cochabamba is an Unitel-owned-and-operated station for the city of Cochabamba. The station operates on VHF channel 13 (digital channel 43, PSIP 13.1).

== History ==
The concept behind channel 13 in Cochabamba dates back to 1982 or 1983, with the project being backed by figures from the political left. It started broadcasting in November 1984, still without a license, and was owned by Jorge Aguilar. Unlike Cochabambina de Televisión, the station's operations were more irregular in nature. For a few weeks in January and February 1985, the station suspended its operations due to technical issues, restarting in March 1985. As a channel needed resources, the initial staff of the station found themselves indebted. Jaime Iriarte Angulo, owner of a newspaper, bought the station from its initial owners and turned it into an apolitical outlet. The licensee was Cochabamba Televisora Iriarte. The station was instrumental in the construction of the Cristo de la Concordia statue between 1987 and 1994. By the early 2000s, the station was owned by Comunicadores Bolivianos Asociados.

Near the mid-2000s, ECOR bought the station. Digital broadcasts started in 2018, alongside its sister stations in the two other main cities of the trunk axis.

== Technical information ==
Virtual	Physical	Screen	Content
13.1	43 UHF	1080i	Unitel

Unitel Cochabamba started its HD signal in 2018.
