= Bolivisión Cochabamba =

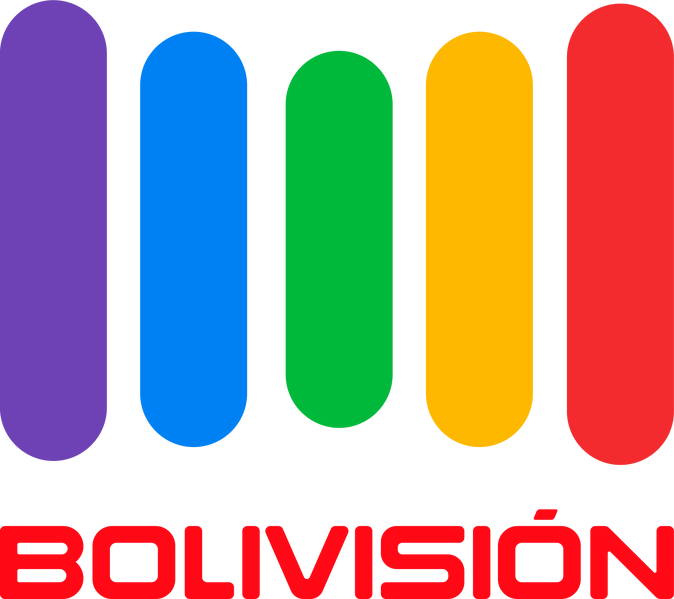
- Cochabamba; Bolivia
- City: Cochabamba
- Channels: Digital: 34; Virtual: 5.1
- Branding: Bolivisión Cochabamba

Programming
- Affiliations: 5.1: Bolivisión; 5.2: CTV Red Nacional

Ownership
- Owner: Albavisión (Antena Uno S.R.L.)

History
- Founded: 1989
- First air date: November 1, 1989
- Former channel number: Analog: 6 (VHF, 1989-1995), 5 (VHF, 1996-2026)
- Former affiliations: Red Uno (1989-1995)

Technical information
- Licensing authority: ATT

Bolivisión Cochabamba (channel 5) is a Bolivian television station licensed to Cochabamba. The station uses the Antena Uno Cochabamba license which is also valid for the network's stations under La Paz's jurisdiction.

== History ==
The station signed on as Antena Uno on channel 6 on November 1, 1989. In 1995, it helped finance a new fire truck for Cochabamba with the help of Taquiña.

In 1994, Ernesto Asbún acquires 51% of Antena Uno, with his wife obtaining 47%. The station would become a part of the new Bolivisión network, with Asbún in its directorate, in 1996.

In late May 2007, Remigio Ángel González visited the facilities in Cochabamba, after he acquired the network.

== Technical information ==
Bolivisión Cochabamba started its HD signal in 2018.

== Programming ==
Bolivisión Cochabamba produces local editions of La Revista Al Día and Noticiero Al Día. During Fexco season it broadcasts special editions of its programs on location. The station has a dedicated stand at the event, featuring presenters from La Paz and Santa Cruz.
