= Red Uno Cochabamba =

Television station in Cochabamba, Bolivia

- La Paz; Bolivia
- City: Cochabamba
- Channels: Digital: 40; Virtual: 9.1
- Branding: Red Uno Cochabamba

Programming
- Affiliations: 9.1: Red Uno

Ownership
- Owner: Grupo Kuljis (Red Uno de Bolivia S.A.)

History
- Founded: 1984
- First air date: 1984
- Former channel number: Analog: 9 (VHF, 1984-2026)
- Former affiliations: Red Tricolor/ATB (1985-1987); Independent (1987-1990; 1996-1999); Cadena ABC (1990-1995)

Technical information
- Licensing authority: ATT

Red Uno Cochabamba is the Red Uno owned-and-operated station for the city of Cochabamba. The station operates on VHF channel 9 (digital channel 40, PSIP 9.1) and is an affiliate of Red Uno de Bolivia.

== History ==
In 1984, among the four initial private television stations that were being set up, one of the stations was set up in Cochabamba, Cochabambina de Televisión, on channel 9. The station had a strong local character, similar to Paceña de Televisión. The station started broadcasting - albeit in experimental format and in an irregular status - at the end of the year, with six hours of programming a day. In this context it starts affiliating itself with ATB and formed Red Tricolor in time for the 1985 general elections.

As of December 1984, the proportion of programming on the station was as follows:

- Feature films: 80%
- Variety: 15&
- Musical programming: 3%
- Children's programming: 1%
- Sports: 1%

On September 10, 1987, the government legalized the station; the owner at the time being John William Block Bonetta. At the same time, the affiliation it had with ATB was broken, as Illimani de Comunicaciones applied for a TV station in the city (channel 4).

One of its main staff in the station's early years journalist Rolando Gamarra Urizar.

At an unknown date, presumably in the late 1990s, Cochabambina de Televisión moved from channel 9 to channel 21. This enabled Red Uno to broadcast locally on channel 9.

On the early hours of September 15, 2008, the station was hit by a dynamite attack, in an attempt to silence the outlet. At about 3am, the aftershock of a dynamite explosion damaged the station's transmitter. The situation raised concerns from other media outlets.

On April 22, 2019, Red Uno Cochabamba introduced a new roster of presenters for the local editions of El Mañanero and Notivisión.

The station's current director of news is Argentine-Bolivian Diego Viamont, who joined Red Uno Cochabamba in 2010.

== Analog-to-digital conversion ==
Red Uno Cochabamba began broadcasting a digital television signal on UHF channel 40 in mid-2018, using virtual channel 9.1. The station continued to broadcast its analog signal concurrently with the digital signal for several years. The station shut down its analog signal at 12:00 a.m. (Bolivian Time) on August 29, 2026, after 42 years of analog broadcasting. The digital signal continued to broadcast on its UHF channel 40, using virtual channel 9.1.
