= Borjana de Televisión =

- San Borja, Bolivia; Bolivia
- City: San Borja
- Channels: Analog: 5 (VHF)
- Branding: Borjana de Televisión

Programming
- Affiliations: Unitel

Ownership
- Owner: Borjana de Televisión

History
- First air date: January 1, 1988
- Former channel numbers: Analog: 6 (VHF, 1988–1993)

Technical information
- Licensing authority: ATT

Borjana de Televisión (channel 5) is a television station licensed to San Borja, a city in Beni Department. Established in 1988, the station is currently a Unitel affiliate.

== History ==
The station started its broadcasts on January 1, 1988, by initiative of Daniel Franco, who was still working with the station as late as 1992. In its early years, together with a team of eight staff, the station produced documentaries on local fauna and flora, as well as local educational programs. By the early 90s, BTV moved to new premises and with improved equipment.

Initially broadcasting on channel 6, the station moved to channel 5 on July 12, 1993. By the early 2000s, the station had become a Unitel affiliate.

On July 31, 2020, BTV broadcast a telethon from the commercial capital of Santa Cruz by initiative of San Borjans living there. The telethon and the related events were due to the dire situation of the pandemic in San Borja.

== Programming ==
As of January 2021, Borjana de Televisión produces a newscast (Informe 5) which has noon and evening editions, only on weekdays. The station accepts local advertisers during the whole broadcast day of the Unitel network (6am to after midnight) and on selected programs on weekends.
