= Bolivisión La Paz =

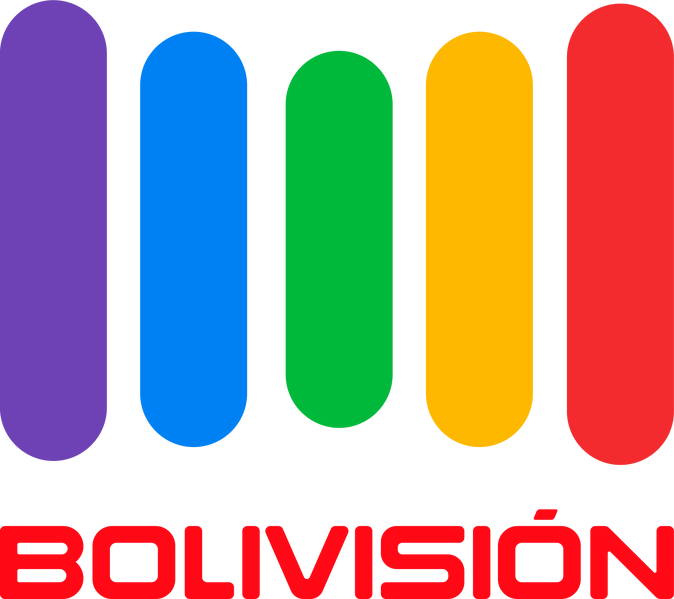
- La Paz; Bolivia
- City: La Paz
- Channels: Digital: 33; Virtual: 5.1
- Branding: Bolivisión La Paz

Programming
- Affiliations: 5.1: Bolivisión; 5.2: Amitel TV

Ownership
- Owner: Albavisión (Antena Uno S.R.L.)

History
- Founded: 1985
- First air date: September 28, 1985
- Former channel number: Analog: 6 (VHF, 1984-1996), 5 (VHF, 1997-2026)
- Former affiliations: Independent (1985-1990); Cadena ABC (1990-1996)

Technical information
- Licensing authority: ATT

Bolivisión La Paz is a Bolivian television station licensed to Santa Cruz de la Sierra. Operating on VHF channel 4 (digital channel 33, PSIP 5.1), is an owned-and-operated station of Bolivisión. The station uses the Antena Uno Cochabamba license.

== History ==
América Televisión (unrelated to the Peruvian channel of the same name) started broadcasting test signals on September 28, 1985 and went regular on November 3, being founded by Banco Mercantil Santa Cruz. The station was broadcast on channel 6, and was owned by Miguel Dueri, owner of the Dueri y Cía record label, with assistance from Rolando and Gonzalo Chiappe. The station was initially branded as ATC 6 (América Televisión Color). The Chiappes assisted in the establishment of Paceña de Televisión (channel 9), but quit early on in order to help establish ATC. Carlos Mesa, who in 1990 founded PAT, worked as a news editor between 1986 and 1987.

In the mid-90s, during a massive network realignment, Asociación Boliviana de Canales (the network ABC was affiliated to) was dissolved. The station was acquired by Ernesto Asbún in 1998, moving Bolivisión from channel 2 while enabling Unitel Bolivia to get a station in the city.

== Technical information ==
Virtual	Physical	Screen	Content
5.1	33 UHF	1080i	Bolivisión
5.2	33 UHF	1080i	AMITEL TV

Bolivisión La Paz started its HD signal in 2018. On December 17, 2022, it started broadcasting from a new transmitter and studio complex in El Alto.

In July 2025, the station's multiplex started carrying AMITEL TV (Agenda Minera Televisión), a channel owned by the Agenda Minera publication, on channel 5.2. The channel carries programs related to the mining industry, general entertainment programming (movies and music) and news.
