= Red ATB =

ATB
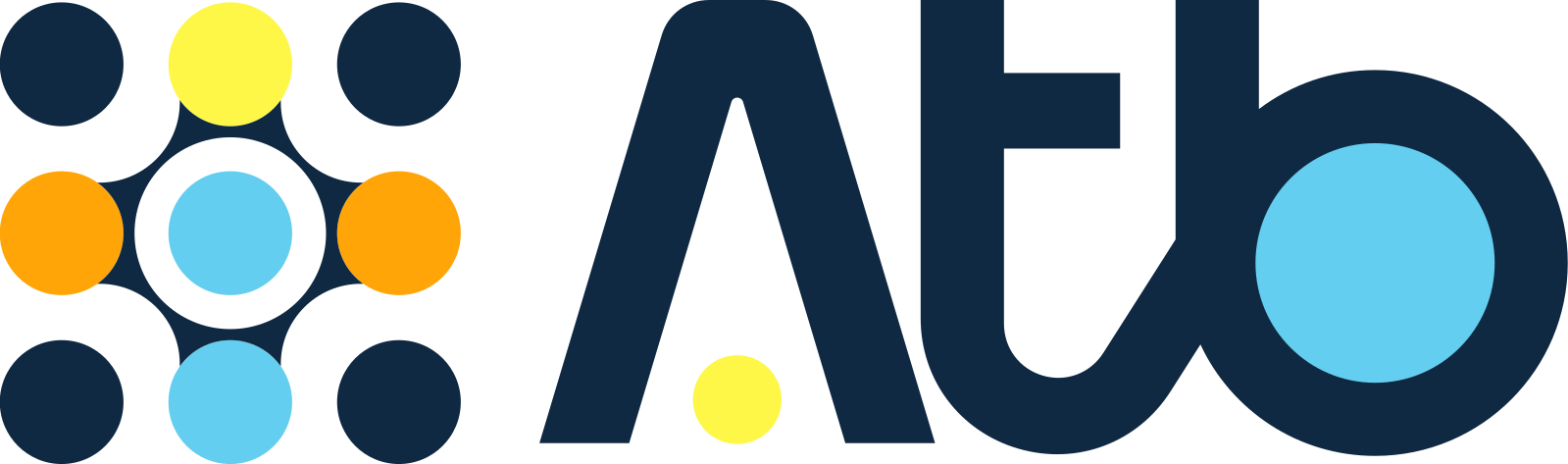
- Type: Television network
- Country: Bolivia
- Broadcast area: Bolivia
- Headquarters: La Paz, Bolivia; Santa Cruz de la Sierra, Bolivia; Cochabamba, Bolivia

Programming
- Language: Spanish
- Picture format: 1080i HDTV (downscaled to 480i for the SDTV feed)

Ownership
- Owner: Grupo Garafulic (1984-2002); Televisa (1992-2000); PRISA (2002-2009); Aikashi Investiments (2009-2013); Invesbol (2014-2021); ATBMedia (2021-present)
- Parent: Illimani de Comunicaciones S.A. (ATBMedia)
- Sister channels: ATB Radio

History
- Founded: October 20, 1984
- Launched: 20 October 1984; 42 years ago (as Paceña de Televisión)
- Founder: Raul Garafulic; Juan Carlos Costas; Gonzalo Chiappe
- Former names: Paceña de Televisión (1984–1987)

Links
- Website: www.atb.com.bo

Availability

Terrestrial
- Digital VHF: Channel 9.1 (La Paz); Channel 4.1 (Cochabamba); Channel 5.1 (Santa Cruz de la Sierra)
- Analog VHF/UHF: Channel 2 (Pando); Channel 4 (Beni); Channel 5 (Sucre); Channel 9 (Oruro); Channel 11 (Potosí); Channel 13 (Tarija)

Red ATB (Asociación Teledifusora Boliviana) is a Bolivian free-to-air television channel. Its origins date back to 20 October 1984 in La Paz, when Paceña de Television (Channel 9) began broadcasting. In the late 1980s the name was changed to ATB. The channel is one of the largest networks in Bolivia.

== History ==
=== Background ===
In the 1970s Hugo Banzer, then president of the Republic of Bolivia, appointed Raúl Garafulic Gutiérrez as general manager of Bolivian TV, who owned most of the shares of the Pucro mining group. It was Garafulic's first contact with the media, which prepared him to own his own TV channel. In 1984 Garafulic created the Illimani de Comunicaciones company to exploit media outlets. on 20 July 1983, Channel 9 of La Paz, then relayer of Televisión Boliviana.

It was in April 1984 that the state media monopoly was broken by the opening two channels in the city of Santa Cruz de la Sierra: Universal Richards channel 5 (also known as Canal 5 Tele-Sat) and Cruceña de Televisión channel 13. This accelerated the launch of Paceña de Televisión. Garafulic joined the businessman who owned Telecine, Gonzalo Chiappe, and Juan Carlos Costas Salmón to open his channel. Notified that it was dangerous to open a pirate TV channel in the heart of the city, he moved to Ciudad Satélite in the Telecine studios to make his first broadcast on the air. An improvised studio was set up and on 20 October 1984, Paceña de Televisión was born. Chiappe and Costas acted as presenters and Juan Carlos Costas introduced himself as the general manager of Channel 9. Raúl Garafulic did not appear in the first broadcast of the channel, fearful of being arrested for operating a pirate TV channel.

=== Paceña de Television (1984–1987) ===
Once the trauma of the start of broadcasts had passed, the following Monday the 22nd, Paceña de Televisión settled in a building on Romecín Campos street in San Jorge and began broadcasting from there. Paceña's daily broadcasts began at 3 in the afternoon and the broadcast closed at midnight. On Saturdays channel 9 broadcast from 5 in the afternoon until midnight and on Sundays it had two broadcasts: a morning one at 10:00 p.m. and another evening at 3:00 p.m. closing at midnight.

Among the first programs of Paceña de Televisión, the relevant shows were: Blanco y Negro, Tres son Multitud and Los Magnificos. The telenovelas El Rafa and La Mestiza served to fill the programming slots of the first few months. Also notable are Lalo LaFaye as host of a game show, Óscar Peña Franco as press director and Johnny Nogales, host of the main newscast called Nueva Imagen.

In 1985, due to the emergence of more private TV channels, Paceña de Televisión had to start broadcasting earlier. From Monday to Friday from noon to midnight. On Saturdays from 9:00 a.m. and on Sundays at the same time. Paceña moved to new studios on Avenida 6 de Agosto next to Rimpolio, a company that sells furniture. The new TV studios gave more space to the channel's productions and Vicky Suazo and Miguel Maldonado joined the group of presenters with Clip Show in the afternoons. Paceña's studio was set up in a building that was adapted as a TV studio, but it did not meet the international specifications for television.

That year the broadcast of the Viña del Mar Festival also began, and the new transmitter was inaugurated, reaching 1 kilowatt of power.

In 1985, the alliance with Millicom International was also consolidated, for the deployment of its own microwave network, which would later become the Red Nacional.

In the general elections of 1985, Paceña de Televisión formed a network with Cruceña de Televisión and Cochabambina de Televisión called Red Tricolor and it was the first time that personal computers were used to do the count of the votes. In the same way, Paceña began the broadcast of Cine Trasnoche on Saturdays at midnight, which had good ratings for the station.

In 1986 Paceña made its first major broadcast of sporting events by broadcasting the FIFA World Cup held in Mexico under the leadership of the Echavarría brothers. At the end of that year, those responsible for channel 9 issued a press release in which they notified their clients and viewers that the Red Nacional would begin in May in the cities of Oruro and Cochabamba.

=== ATB Red Nacional (1987–1992) ===
In May 1987, the Asociación de Teledifusoras Bolivianas network was born with the union of channels 9 from La Paz, 8 from Oruro —created on 8 May 1987— and 4 from Cochabamba -created on 7 January 1987– The link of microwaves was provided by Millicom International that designed, assembled and executed a network of repeaters throughout three departments of the national territory.

As an emblem program of the National Network, A Todo Bingo was born, hosted by Lalo LaFaye, and Bingo Show a subsequent program with international guests. A Todo Bingo made a raffle of bingo balls that people had to buy and fill as they left. A filled card meant Bingo. The development of the program was done through a computerized system that gave the name and location of the winner.

ATB Red Nacional began broadcasting successful Venezuelan telenovelas in its primetime sector. Other outstanding programs of this time are The Transformers, G.I. Joe, the broadcasts of Formula 1. The broadcast schedule was extended to 7:00 a.m. from Monday to Friday and from 8 on Saturdays and Sundays.

In 1987, ATB and Teleoriente, owned by Grupo Monasterio, signed an agreement by which Canal 9 de Santa Cruz was added to the Red Nacional as a partner. Channel 9 of La Paz premiered its mobile unit. Johnny Nogales resigns and Carlos Mesa temporarily assumes the leadership of the central newscast

In 1988, ATB expanded to the south, reaching the departments of Potosí, Sucre and Tarija. Broadcasts began in Trinidad in 1989, but the link was very complicated due to the number of rivers and jungles that cross the route between the departments of Beni and Cochabamba, called Isiboro Sécure.

In 1990, ATB Red Nacional broadcast the Italia 90 World Cup, again hosted by the Echavarría brothers. That same year, ATB La Paz moved to its new studio on Avenida Argentina, in the Miraflores neighborhood. In 1991 a computer graphics system from Silicon Graphics arrives at ATB. Óscar Dorado joins to lead Más Deporte and Jacqueline Jiménez in the Jacky Show. A program from the production company PAT is added: De Cerca

In 1992, the Televisa network bought 30% of ATB, thus introducing Mexican telenovelas and programs to the national network's programming.

=== ATB and Televisa (1992–1995) ===
ATB becomes the Televisa channel in the country.

In 1993, with an alliance of third parties from Toei Company (Japan), series from the aforementioned company were broadcast, both anime that at the time were also considered animated series and series of the tokusatsu genre.

In 1994, ATB Red Nacional and CDT broadcast the USA 94 World Cup together with Televisión Boliviana. The match between the Bolivian team and Germany is the match with the highest audience in the history of Bolivian TV.

In 1995 the partnership between the Monasterio Group and Illimani de Comunicaciones ended and ATB was left off the air in Santa Cruz de la Sierra, due to the fact that the Monasterio Family, with its own alliances, started the national television network project Unitel. Together with Ernesto Asbún, ex-owner of the Taquiña brewery, they buy the ABC network from Banco Mercantil and in this way ATB can broadcast again in Santa Cruz.

That same year ATB exclusively broadcast the Copa América Uruguay 95.

=== The Media Conglomerate (1995–2002) ===
With his sights set on La Razón, Raúl Garafulic makes a proposal to the owners, the Canelas family, and takes over the largest newspaper in the country. Together with ATB, part of the shares of Bolivisión, 100% of La Razón and shares in the daily Opinion, El Nuevo Día, Extra; 30% of shares in RTP, Radio Metropolitana and Doble Ocho Latina; the ownership and management of Vida Sana, La Gaceta Jurídica, Viva el Diario Deportivo and another small part in Bolivian Times; in addition to reference percentages in magazines such as Cosas and the 6 de Agosto cinema. Outside the media, Garafulic was a shareholder in the AFP Previsión of BBVA and LAB Together with his partner Ernesto Asbún. Illimani de Comunicaciones had become a huge media octopus with a presence in the press, radio and television.

On 24 April 1996, the ATB Network began broadcasting the CONMEBOL France 98 Qualifiers where it broadcast the matches of the Bolivian Soccer Team away against Ecuador, Venezuela, Argentina, Peru and Colombia live for all of Bolivia, so the channel broadcast the 3 matches of those South American qualifiers for France 98 also live for all of Bolivia.

In February 1997, ATB began broadcasting via satellite through Intelsat in the Bolivian MUX. For the return signal, it continued to use Entel's microwave network.

In 1997, ATB broadcast the Copa América Bolivia 97 and for this it bought a large amount of equipment, mainly mobile units that made possible the links to La Paz, Santa Cruz, Cochabamba, Sucre and Oruro

In 1998, ATB broadcast the World Cup France 98 together with Bolivian Television. The comments were made by Lorenzo Carri.

The network started to digitize its equipment in 1999.

In October 2000, the Spanish group PRISA (Promotora de Informaciones Sociedad Anónima), a Spanish company, bought the share package that was owned by Televisa, leaving the Mexicans out of their business. Apart from ATB Red Nacional, PRISA buys the preferred shares in La Razón.

Garafulic made huge investments in his communications group, such as the purchase and installation of a gigantic Goss printing press that was barely brought up to the Alto Auquisamaña neighborhood. But the loss of control over ATB and La Razón occurred because he lost the support of ADN due to his confrontation with Minister Guiteras; the surprising growth of Unitel; the problems caused by the Lloyd Aéreo Boliviano and the sale of its Pucro mine.

Garafulic had debts with PRISA and this Spanish company, faced with a lack of cash, took over the entire stock package of La Razón and ATB Red Nacional.

=== The short reign of PRISA (2002–2007) ===
PRISA gave a lawsuit to ATB in April 2003 after a conflict between the two emerged over an increase in capital, demanding an increase in US$11.2 million plus interest rates involved. On June 30, it was announced that Prisa would auction its shares in Bolivia, on July 15, for a value of US$6.25 million, after Garafulic repeatedly refused to pay a loan acquired from the Sabadell bank, shared with PRISA. The auction was later suspended due to a lack of bidders.

In October 2003, ATB announced an agreement with American production company Anderson Productions, from Connecticut, to produce segments for its sports news program, Deporte Total. The first dispatch produced by the company was a summary of a friendly match between Bolivia and Honduras.

Raúl Garafulic died on November 21, 2003, victim of an air accident. He was the president of the network at the time.

Once owners of the two largest media outlets of Grupo Garafulic, due more than anything to an economic factor and not to interest in the company and not in the Bolivian market, PRISA managed for about four years with more desire to sell all the shares and recovering the money invested than continuing to grow. Finally, in 2007, PRISA sold the shares of the Bolivian media to Akaishi Investments, a Spanish company.

In 2005, ATB was the most-watched private network.

RTP and Radio Metropolitana once again belonged to Mónica Medina; Things was sold to a former government minister; LAB went bankrupt and Ernesto Asbún fled the country by selling his shares in Bolivisión to a group of Mexican shareholders Albavisión; Bolivian Times returned to the hands of its previous owners.

=== Akaishi Investments stage (2008–2013) and Invesbol stage (2014–2019) ===
ATB returns to Bolivian hands when the Spanish company Akaishi Investments sells its shares to the Bolivian company Invesbol, made up of Jaime "Jimmy" Iturri Salmón, Marcelo Hurtado (president of the ATB board) and Luis Nemtala. Thus, ATB's programming is renewed and allows the return of Argentine teleseries and Brazilian telenovelas, preserving emblematic programs such as "Sábados Populares" and with Adolfo Paco and his son Cori Paco as hosts and the great return of the experienced María René Duchén as host of Noticiando. It expanded its operations in Santa Cruz, bet on national production, implementing ATB Documents, the only journalistic investigation program in the form of reportage and documentary.

From 2010, it started airing Nickelodeon series (which was valid until 2020) and lost its first place to Unitel, while still having the slogan "la red que Bolivia ve".

In October 2014, Ernesto Asbún bought 25% of the shares held by Garafulic.

In mid-2016, the directors of the channel began negotiations to launch a version of ATB in Argentina for Bolivian residents in that country, under the name of ATB Argentina with the slogan: The channel that the Bolivian community sees . ATB Argentina is broadcast from Buenos Aires and has almost the same programming as the Bolivian signal.

During this period, this and other media such as La Razón and PAT, were accused by social sectors opposed to Evo Morales of being a parastatal and having a biased editorial line with the regime, in addition to being managed by businessmen linked to Álvaro García Linera.

==== ATB Digital ====
On 21 June in La Paz, during the 'Aimara New Year' ceremony, ATB made its digital signal official with the name of ATB Digital, more however the HD has a tentative date of 20 October 2018, as part of the anniversary of the creation of Channel 9 La Paz (headquarters of Red ATB), being the fourth channel in Bolivia to be launched on the TDT and the second within private companies.

==== Social conflicts of 2019 and links with Evo Morales ====
On 10 November 2019, after the resignation of Evo Morales, Iturri resigned from his position at ATB. In the last years before this event,

=== Time without Jimmy Iturri, complaints and COVID-19 (2019–2020) ===
The channel renewed its image in 2020 and now also broadcasts some classic, renewed programs, such as Estudio Abierto, hosted by Ramón Grimalt and María Rene Duchen. In November 2019, he negotiated unsuccessfully with Televisa and Telemundo.

On 10 May (coinciding with the anniversary of RTP) the romantic comedy film Deception at first sight premiered on national television in co-production/distribution with Latin Actors, directed by and starring the brothers Yecid Jr. and Johanan Benavides.

On 17 August, the old telenovelas of Rede Globo from Brazil start broadcasting, starting with Avenida Brasil.

On 21 September and as part of its renewal after its deteriorated image and its relationship with the old regime, it premieres the telenovela Con el corazón, the children's program Creetelo, the politician Encuentro 2020, among others.

Already for October it announces the Co-production with PROMEDIOS, for a new program entitled Mi casa es tu casa, as the return of Giovana Chávez after the meager numbers with Noobees and Club 57.

==== Case of the relationship between PAT and ATB ====
The government of Jeanine Áñez began criminal proceedings against the shareholders of ATB, PAT and La Razón for illicit economic acts. In the case of PAT, Hurtado is implicated in the irregular purchase of the channel, being arrested and charged on 3 January 2020 by the Public Ministry. Hurtado is released, and then arrested again, on this occasion, it is sued by ATB, but its legal situation was stalled.

An arrest warrant was also issued against Iturri for alleged irregularities in the acquisition of the television networks ATB and PAT, denounced by senators Oscar Ortiz and Carmen Eva Gonzales, but he left the country for Argentina, assuring that "he will return if the investigations are carried out in accordance with the law" and that he has no ties with the MAS-IPSP.

==== Government millionaire advertising ====
On 7 May 2020, Isabel Fernández (Minister of Communication of the Áñez government) revealed that between 2011 and 2019 all national signal media received payments for propaganda of the previous regime, with an amount of 107 million bolivianos between 2017 and 2019 for ATB. The channel's general manager, Luis Nemtala, denied the accusations and said that he will verify the data, affirming that said issue corresponds to the "editorial part".

=== Second era of Iturri (2020–2025) ===
Hours after Luis Arce Catacora was sworn in, ATB (and later other media) reported that Hurtado's lawyer and the media outlet denounced an alleged act of extortion by Marco Antonio Cossío, La Paz departmental prosecutor. Cossío demands, according to the information, the actions and control of this outlet in exchange for Hurtado's release.

After Iturri's return, most of his own programs were canceled due to various factors, including lack of audience and excessive government advertising. ATB and La Razón take up the editorial line in favor of the Luis Arce government and its policies, and Hurtado again assumes the presidency of the channel.

This allows the channel to benefit from an agreement for the diffusion of EducaBolivia (official educational TV slot of the Ministry of Education).

In the midst of the sub-national elections 2021, WarnerMedia and Sony Pictures sign with Unitel. ATB struck a deal to air reruns and reclaim the rights from Warner Bros. weeks later to share rights with Unitel. Consequently, it won the rights to Paramount Pictures, Nickelodeon and ViacomCBS (now Paramount Global and Paramount Skydance) from RTP (despite handing over to RTP in 2017–2019 and the rights from Nickelodeon to Red Uno in 2020). Sony renewed its contract in June 2021, exclusively with Unitel after the launch of Disney+.

On 3 November 2021, after the Pandora Papers leaks, it is reported that Iturri was the beneficiary of an offshore under the company Fufurufu Inc. in the British Virgin Islands, with the help of his father (Jaime Iturri Salinas) and his mother.

In 2023, a report was published on the deactivation of Facebook accounts linked to Luis Arce's government, by Meta Platforms (parent company of Facebook), Carlos Romero Bonifaz (former minister in the Evo Morales government), denounced a link between the subsidiary of the state company, Entel (Entel Dinámica) and ATB (Asociados del Canal Valle S.A.) to "embezzle funds" in order to finance such accounts by from the government, for an amount of Bs. 30 million.

=== Financial and institutional crisis (2025 - 2026) ===
On May 1, 2025, Labor Day, the ATB labor union issued a note of condemnation that the staff did not receive theirpayments for over six months working at the network. Other reports noted the withdrawal of the over-the-air signal in La Paz, continuing programming from Santa Cruz de la Sierra and Cochabamba, as well as "collective vacation" to the people working at the station in La Paz. Jaime Iturri, on the other hand, did not release a statement facing the union's requests.

That day, the staff took to the streets, demanding the following of their working rights, payment of salaries and pension funds. Among these demands, it was revealed that managing director Jimmy Iturry admitted the lack of cancelling the delayed payments, but insisted the staff to "keep on working", though the channel had advertising slots to pay, either commercial or governmental.

The National Journalists Association of Bolivia pronounced its concern and solidarity at the people working at ATB La Paz - Canal 9, through a statement. In it, it condemned "the suspension of financial support to AFP and the management, and imposed forced collective vacations in the seat of government", as well as a flagrant lack of the right to pay salaries and social securities, as well as a silencing strategy that also made the labor protest invisible.

The crisis even reached the Departmental Labor Central of La Paz, which, in a resolution, declared Jaime Iturry an "enemy of the workers", and noted that ATB received over 107 million bolivianos (corresponding at the time to over US$10 million), during the last three years of Evo Morales' government, and even so, it did not regularize its social and working debts.

The network issued a statement giving vacations to the affected staff, with the apparent cause being the change of its internet connection. However, the document did not manage professional breaches to staff.

On December 1, 2025, a penal lawsuit against Víctor Branimir Flores V., the commercial manager of ATB "Illimani de Comunicaciones S.A.", was filed, being accused of "improper appropriation" of the support of the staff to the Integral Pension System of the Public Management. The Fides News Agency reported that the declarations of one of ATB's Mixed Labor Union representatives, Juan Carlos Mendoza, who ratified the notification from citizen Branimir F., tried to establish contact with Jaime Iturri to tell his version of the events, which in a short and aggressive manner against the agency's journalists said that he had "nothing to declare".

Mendoza owed that the company owes a maximum of almost 40 months of financial support to its staff, affecting over 250 citizens, either workers at the time, such as 57 workers -at the time of publishing-, and the company admitted bad financial management, as well as bad investments. This affected the pension funds of each of the over 250 affected.

In an interview on the network's La Noche, Iturri showed concern, and admitted that the company was in a crisis, but assured of a positive outcome for the future. He mentioned that the channel used to earn 14 million bolivianos a year and, in 2020, only 3,8 million. The pandemic and the government of Jeanine Áñez heavily affected the channel and Áñez was critical of the channel, which explained the lack of political advertising. The people in charge (Iturri was exiled back then) decided not to pay to AFPs due to lack of money and there were also obligations to pay staff, programming, studio lights and others. He also revealed at least six sale offers of the network, contradicting the criticism of advertising money obtained from government advertising in the Luis Arce Catacora government.

Following the interview and detention of the manager-general, on December 12, 2025, it was confirmed that the new directive exiled Jaime Iturri from ATB, creating a restructuring process.

At the end of the year, Carla Patricia Soria Galvarro -through her social media accounts-, deceived by the cancelling of the ATB rebranding announced in October 2025 at the network's 2026 upfront (under the slogan "siempre con vos"), and the cancelling of several projects (telenovelas, TV series, micro newscasts, cultural, agricultural, cattle and society programs), decided to quit her job as ATB Santa Cruz's director of programming.

Later, in January 2026, Amílcar Torrico confirmed Jimmy Iturri's exit, however, the payment issues that indebted ATB are yet to be solved. There were also plans to improvise the return of the classic slogan "el canal de la familia" and the rebranding of the channel.

== Network ==
City	Channel	Licensee	Notes
La Paz	9	Illimani de Comunicaciones, SA	ATB O&O
Achacachi	9	Illimani de Comunicaciones, SA	ATB O&O
Achacachi	12	Illimani de Comunicaciones, SA	ATB relayer
Bolinda	9	Illimani de Comunicaciones, SA	ATB O&O
Bolinda	13	Illimani de Comunicaciones, SA	ATB relayer
Caranavi	9	Illimani de Comunicaciones, SA	ATB O&O
Caranavi	13	Illimani de Comunicaciones, SA	ATB relayer
Cerro Mururata	9	Illimani de Comunicaciones, SA	ATB O&O
Cerro Mururata	13	Illimani de Comunicaciones, SA	ATB relayer
Chulumani-Huancane	9	Illimani de Comunicaciones, SA	ATB O&O
Chulumani-Huancane	13	Illimani de Comunicaciones, SA	ATB relayer
Coripata	9	Illimani de Comunicaciones, SA	ATB O&O
Coripata	13	Illimani de Comunicaciones, SA	ATB relayer
Coroico	9	Illimani de Comunicaciones, SA	ATB O&O
Coroico	13	Illimani de Comunicaciones, SA	ATB relayer
Pilon	9	Illimani de Comunicaciones, SA	ATB O&O
Pilon	13	Illimani de Comunicaciones, SA	ATB relayer
Tipuani	9	Illimani de Comunicaciones, SA	ATB O&O
Tipuani	13	Illimani de Comunicaciones, SA	ATB relayer
Tres Arroyos	9	Illimani de Comunicaciones, SA	ATB O&O
Tres Arroyos	13	Illimani de Comunicaciones, SA	ATB relayer
Santa Cruz de la Sierra	5	Illimani de Comunicaciones, SA	ATB O&O
Santa Cruz de la Sierra	39	Illimani de Comunicaciones, SA and Copacabana de Televisión, SRL CTV.	Given to Illimani (ATB), carries Católica TV
Capinota	4	Illimani de Comunicaciones, SA	ATB relayer
Capinota	12	Illimani de Comunicaciones, SA	ATB O&O
Cochabamba	4	Illimani de Comunicaciones, SA	ATB O&O
Valle Alto	12	Illimani de Comunicaciones, SA	ATB O&O
Valle Alto	45	Illimani de Comunicaciones, SA	Given to Illimani (ATB), carries Abya Yala TV
Colomi	9	Illimani de Comunicaciones, SA	ATB O&O
Valle Alto	12	Illimani de Comunicaciones, SA	ATB O&O
Cochabamba	46	Illimani de Comunicaciones, SA	Given to Illimani (ATB), likely carries Abya Yala TV
Trinidad	4	Illimani de Comunicaciones, SA	ATB O&O
Sucre	5	Illimani de Comunicaciones, SA	ATB O&O
Oruro	9	Illimani de Comunicaciones, SA	ATB O&O
Cobija	2	Illimani de Comunicaciones, SA	ATB O&O
Potosí	11	Illimani de Comunicaciones, SA	ATB O&O
Tarija	13	Illimani de Comunicaciones, SA	ATB O&O

== Announcers ==
- Claudio Zambrana (2007–2021). It was also the voice of RTP since 1996, until the split of the Garafulic Group in 2007. It was the test voiceover since 2002 in ATB.
- Ariel Sanchez (2021–2022)
- Gian Marco Illanes Jáuregui (2021–present)

== Presenters ==
- Gonzalo Cobo
- Giovanna Chavez
- Danahe Alvarez
- Jimmy Iturri
- Irais Alarcón
- Walter Ferreira
- Alejandra Ramos
- Rayza Tercero
- Rodrigo Eguino
- Rolando Montesinos

=== Former ===
- Ramón Grimalt
- Marcela Rengel
- Mauricio Caballero
- Daniel Castellón
- Carlos Enrique Rivera
- María Delgado
- Toto Arévalo
- Maricruz Ribera
- Lianna Pérez
- Carolina Córdova
- Felipe Bacca
- Daniel Ardiles
- Gabriel Nogales
- Ninozka Crespo
- Pamela Moreno
- Lorena Ribera
- Mónica García
- Pedro García
- Alejandra Quiroga
- Maywa Jauregui
- Wilma Alanoca Mamani
- José Miguel Arévalo
- César Galindo
- Sandra Alcázar
- Valeria Bacarreza Del Pozo
- Luis Manuel Ávila
- Claudia Arce Lemaitre
- Davinia Fernández
- Alejandro Pinedo
- Paola Canedo
- Laura Pérez
- Ariel Sánchez
- Fabiana Villarroel
- Adrián Zalles
- Claudia Villegas
- Sandra Taborga
- Lucila Quiroga
- Leonel Fransezze
- Soraya Delfín

== Programs ==
=== Movie rights ===
ATB owns the rights to Warner Bros., New Line Cinema, Metro-Goldwyn-Mayer, Lions Gate Entertainment, Universal Studios (Since 2019 when Unitel loses rights), Paramount Pictures, Summit Entertainment, DreamWorks Animation among others.

=== Newscasts ===
- La mañana de todos from 6:15.
- ANT (Anoticiando), al mediodía Edición Merdiana at 12:00.
- ATB Noticias Edición Central at 19:00.
- Entrelineas (formerly Luna Nueva, Anoticiando and Estudio Abierto). From 9:30 p.m.

In the cities of La Paz, Cochabamba, and Santa Cruz de la Sierra they broadcast their news from their regions and then broadcast it nationally with contacts from each department of the Bolivian trunk news most important in the country and abroad.
