= Fernando Eid =

Bolivian journalist

- Born: 20 June 1992 (age 33); Santa Cruz de la Sierra, Bolivia
- Occupation: Journalist at Al Día
- Website: www.fernandoeid.com

Fernando Eid (born 20 June 1992) is a Bolivian journalist and media personality. He currently reports for the morning magazine Al Día and television station Bolivisión.

== Career ==
Eid began his career in media in 2009. At that time, he was a radio host on Bolivian stations such as Radio Disney, Radio Activa and Radio El Debe. He was in programs Tweeners (ATB), Chicostation (Unitel), El Mañanero, Pura Vida and Singing for a Dream (Red Uno), PAT News and Noticia De La Hora (RED PAT). Since September 2019 he has been the presenter of the magazine Al Día and Bolivisión.

== Other websites ==
- Fernando Eid on Twitter
