= Entel (Bolivia) =

Bolivian telecommunications company

Entel S.A.
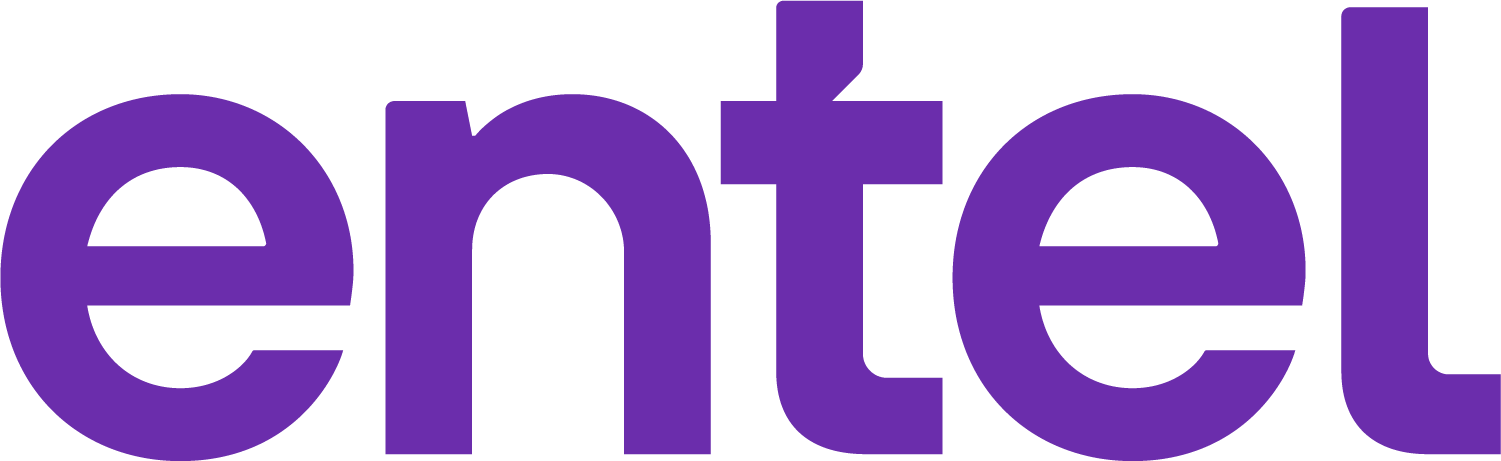
- Type: Sociedad Anónima
- Industry: Telecommunications
- Founded: 22 December 1965; 60 years ago
- Founder: René Barrientos
- Headquarters: Federico Zuazo 1771, La Paz, Bolivia
- Number of locations: More than 1000 points
- Area served: Bolivia
- Key people: Edgar Montaño (Minister of Public Works, Services and Housing); Roque Roy Mendez (chairman)
- Products: Landline telephony, mobile telephony, fixed internet, mobile internet, IP television, IT services
- Owner: Majority stake (97.4671%); Gruppo TIM (1995-2008); Ministry of Public Works, Services, and Housing (2008-present)
- Divisions: Entel Financiera ESPM S.R.L.
- Subsidiaries: Datacom S.R.L. Entel Bolivia S.A.C.
- Website: www.entel.bo

Entel S.A. (acronym for Empresa Nacional de Telecomunicaciones) is a major Bolivian state-owned telecommunications company, headquartered in La Paz, Bolivia.

Entel was founded on December 22, 1965 by Law Decree N° 7441 as a joint-stock company with official representation in Bolivia. In 1966 it became a decentralized public company, under the supervision of the Ministry of Transport, Communications and Aeronautics.

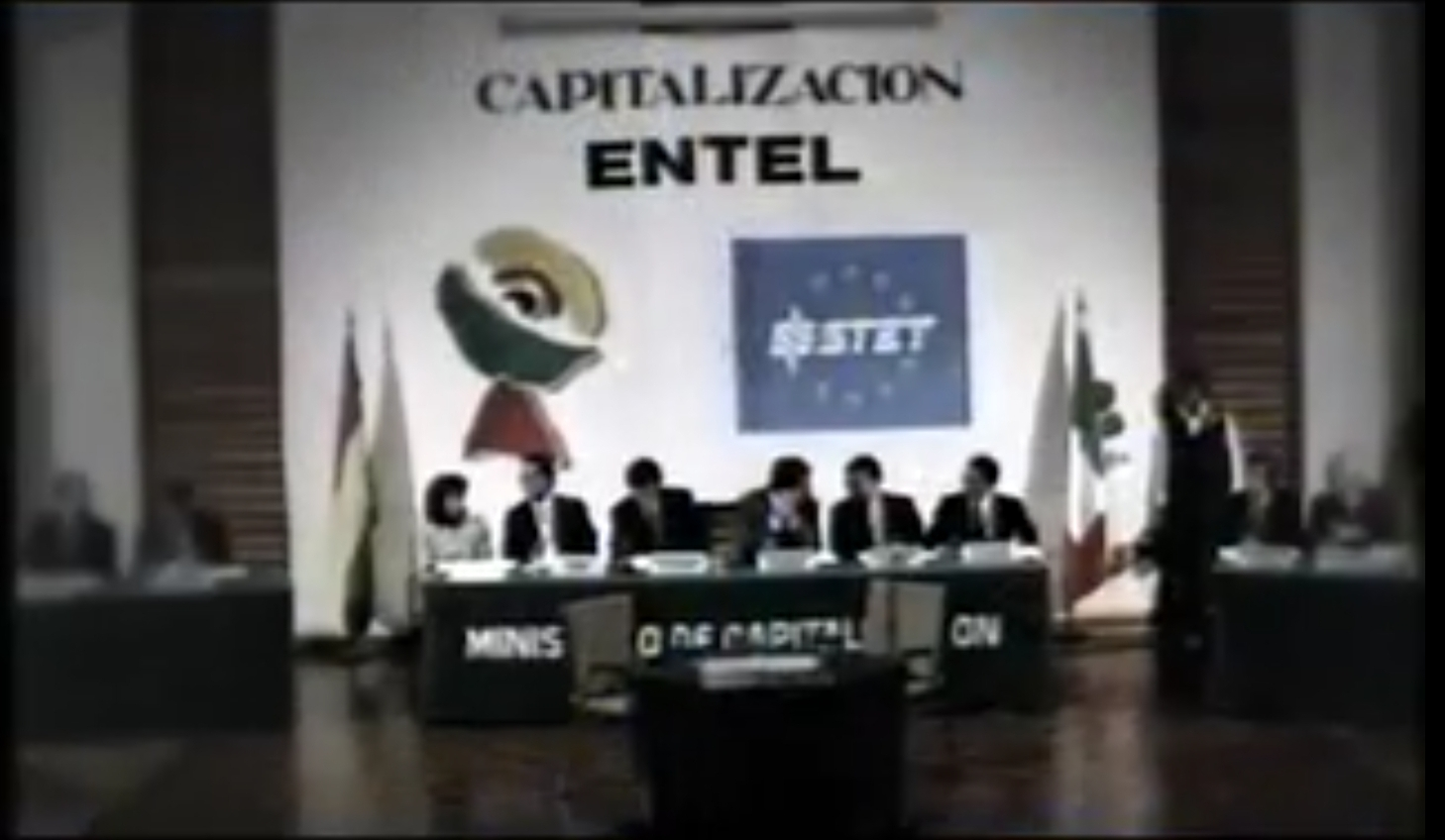
A meeting on the privatization process that the Bolivian government capitalizes Entel to STET, which at one time became Telecom Italia.

On November 27, 1995, STET which would eventually become Telecom Italia was granted 50% of Entel's shares and management of the company. In addition, the Telecommunications Law (Law No. 1632 of July 5, 1995) granted Entel a six-year monopoly on national and international long-distance telephone services. Telecom Italia, on its part, committed to implement an investment plan totaling US$610 million and to meet the expansion and quality goals defined by the law and by the concession contract.

On May 1, 2008, Entel was nationalized by Supreme Decree N° 29544. Bolivia became the owner of 97% of the company's shares through the Ministry of Public Works, Services, and Housing; the labor stability of Entel's workers is guaranteed, and as well as the contracts signed with customers and suppliers. The decree orders the transformation of Entel from a private corporation to a mixed-economy company, disposition not fulfilled to 2021.

A milestone was reached in the company's history, due to the launch of the Túpac Katari 1 satellite that would be beneficial for its coverage in Bolivia, in December 2013. This was Bolivia's first telecommunications satellite and will also improve connection speeds in the process.

In September 2017, the company announced that it would enter the Peruvian telecommunications market, and also invest US$60 million in the process.

Entel announced that they were creating a fiber-optic network in May 2019.

In September 2019, they successfully tested 5G in Santa Cruz de la Sierra, along with Chinese company Huawei.

In September 2020, they successfully connected their fiber optic network to the international network.

== Sponsorship ==
As of 2021, Entel was the official jersey sponsor of Bolivia's national basketball team.
