= ATB La Paz =

ATB La Paz (CP-51 TV)
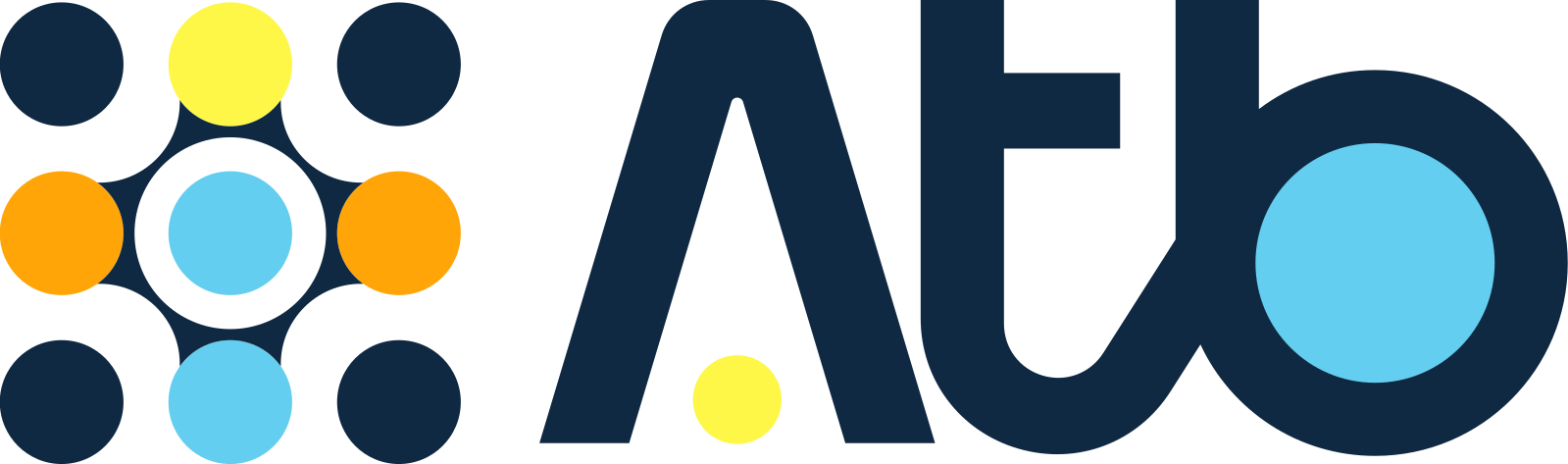
- La Paz; Bolivia
- City: La Paz
- Channels: Digital: 40; Virtual: 9.1
- Branding: ATB La Paz

Programming
- Affiliations: 9.1: ATB

Ownership
- Owner: ATBMedia (Illimani de Comunicaciones S.A.)

History
- Founded: 1984
- First air date: October 20, 1984
- Former channel number: Analog: 9 (VHF, 1984–2026)
- Former affiliations: Independent (1984-1985; 1985-1987); Red Tricolor (1985)

Technical information
- Licensing authority: ATT

ATB La Paz (channel 9) is a Red ATB-owned-and-operated station as well as its flagship station. It started broadcasting on October 20, 1984 as the first private television station in the national capital.

== History ==
Paceña de Televisión started broadcasting on October 20, 1984, that date coincided with the anniversary of the founding of La Paz. Raúl Garafulic was convinced that the aggravation of the existing Televisión Boliviana monopoly was negative for the Bolivian television market, as well as parastatal channels like the university's channel (13). At launch, the station had the role of protecting the interests of the city and department of La Paz, however there would still be attention given to national integration. It also pledged to express all levels of the socio-political sphere, instead of TVB's one-sided propaganda. Early surveys gave the station a high share of viewers.In 1990, the station moved to its new studio on Avenida Argentina, in the Miraflores neighborhood.

Digital broadcasts started in 2018.

On April 30, 2025, the station suspended production for the national network, as its staff had up to six months unpaid salaries. Consequently, the network resorted to its O&Os in Santa Cruz and Cochabamba for production. This marks the first time the network operates from outside of its La Paz flagship. The station's staff took part in a strike protest on May 1.
