= Caraparí =

Coordinates: 21.8278°S 63.7414°W

- Town
- Interactive map of Caraparí
- Country: Bolivia
- Time zone: UTC-4 (BOT)

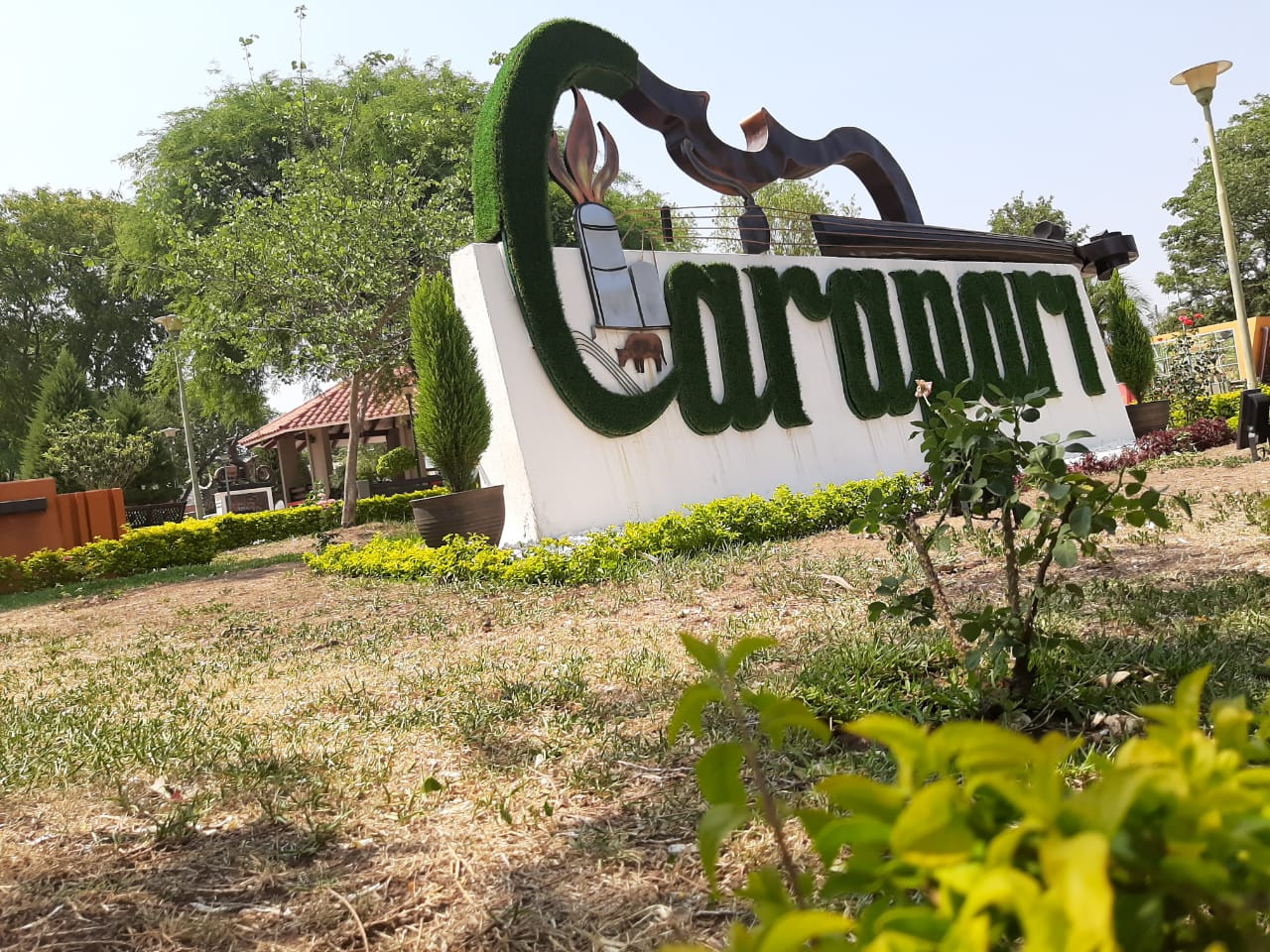
Caraparí Gran Chaco Tarija

Caraparí is a small town in Bolivia. Its name is due to a kind of tree originating from these places, in 2009 it had an estimated population of 1461.

== Climate ==
Climate data for Común (Itau), elevation 800 m (2,600 ft), (1973–2015)
Month	Jan	Feb	Mar	Apr	May	Jun	Jul	Aug	Sep	Oct	Nov	Dec	Year
Mean daily maximum °C (°F)	30.5 (86.9)	29.3 (84.7)	28.0 (82.4)	25.5 (77.9)	22.2 (72.0)	21.7 (71.1)	22.0 (71.6)	25.8 (78.4)	28.6 (83.5)	31.7 (89.1)	30.4 (86.7)	30.8 (87.4)	27.2 (81.0)
Daily mean °C (°F)	23.8 (74.8)	22.9 (73.2)	22 (72)	19.9 (67.8)	16.4 (61.5)	14.7 (58.5)	14.2 (57.6)	16.9 (62.4)	19.5 (67.1)	22.9 (73.2)	22.6 (72.7)	23.7 (74.7)	20.0 (68.0)
Mean daily minimum °C (°F)	17.1 (62.8)	16.5 (61.7)	16.1 (61.0)	14.3 (57.7)	10.6 (51.1)	7.9 (46.2)	6.3 (43.3)	8.0 (46.4)	10.4 (50.7)	14.2 (57.6)	14.8 (58.6)	16.5 (61.7)	12.7 (54.9)
Average precipitation mm (inches)	175.8 (6.92)	164.3 (6.47)	147.1 (5.79)	68.0 (2.68)	23.4 (0.92)	10.6 (0.42)	4.6 (0.18)	5.3 (0.21)	12.7 (0.50)	49.4 (1.94)	92.5 (3.64)	147.8 (5.82)	901.5 (35.49)
Average precipitation days	8.7	7.7	8.0	6.2	3.8	2.4	1.4	1.1	1.8	3.8	6.3	8.0	59.2
Source: Servicio Nacional de Meteorología e Hidrología de Bolivia
