= La Razón (La Paz) =

Bolivian daily newspaper

- Front page for 23 February 2022
- Type: Daily newspaper
- Founded: 7 June 1990
- Language: Spanish
- City: La Paz
- Country: Bolivia
- Website: www.larazon.bo

La Razón is a Bolivian daily newspaper published in La Paz. The newspaper was founded on 16 May, and began publication on 7 June 1990.
