= Unitel Santa Cruz =

- Santa Cruz de la Sierra; Bolivia
- City: Santa Cruz de la Sierra
- Channels: Digital: 31 (UHF); Virtual: 9.1
- Branding: Unitel Santa Cruz

Programming
- Affiliations: 9.1: Unitel; 9.2: Cadena A

Ownership
- Owner: Grupo Monasterios (Empresa de Comunicaciones del Oriente Ltda. Ecor Ltda)

History
- Founded: 1987
- First air date: February 21, 1987
- Former channel number: Analog: 9 (VHF, 1987-2026)
- Former affiliations: Red ATB (1987-1995); Independent (1995-1997)

Technical information
- Licensing authority: ATT

Unitel Santa Cruz (channel 9) is the Unitel flagship owned-and-operated station for the city of Santa Cruz de la Sierra. The station generates the network's national programming.

== History ==
The company was established as Canal 9 - Red Teleoriente, operating under the corporate name Canal 9 de Televisión - Comunicaciones del Oriente. The launch was supported by companies in the public and private sectors in the local press, such as El Deber and El Mundo.

The station started broadcasting as Teleoriente in February 1987, commencing regular telecasts on the 21st of that month, using the logo and slogan (Un canal con sentido) of Canal 9 from Peru. The first program seen was an episode of the US cartoon The Smurfs at 6pm; the entire day entirely consisted of imported content apart from a one-hour launch special at 8pm. Señor Cine (still used by Unitel) first aired that day with the airing of Dune. The first full day of programming was on February 22, starting at 11:30am with the switch on of its signal with thirty minutes of a test pattern, followed by a special program at 12pm and extending for over fourteen hours.

The station had small facilities, but had the ambitions to overcome limitations in the human resources and broadcasting sectors. Teleoriente consolidated its position as a local television station when, in 1991, it affiliated with Red ATB, enabling its programs to be seen in seven of the nine departments of Bolivia. In 1993, the station introduced a new building, which as of 2008 was still in use.

In September 1997, the rift caused the station to generate a new network, Unitel, the new channel was officially launched via satellite and shortly thereafter it obtained national coverage. The station digitized its equipment in April 2007, alongside Unitel La Paz.

== Technical information ==
Channel	Video	Aspect	Short name	Programming	Note
9.1	1080i	16:9	UNITEL HD	Unitel (Main Programming)	Commercial Broadcast
9.2	480i	16:9	CADENA A	Cadena A	Commercial Broadcast

Unitel Santa Cruz started its HD signal in 2018.

The station will shut down its analog signal over VHF channel 9 on May 30, 2026, following the official ATT roadmap, where the analog signals in the three trunk axis capitals will be switched off.
