= Bolivisión =

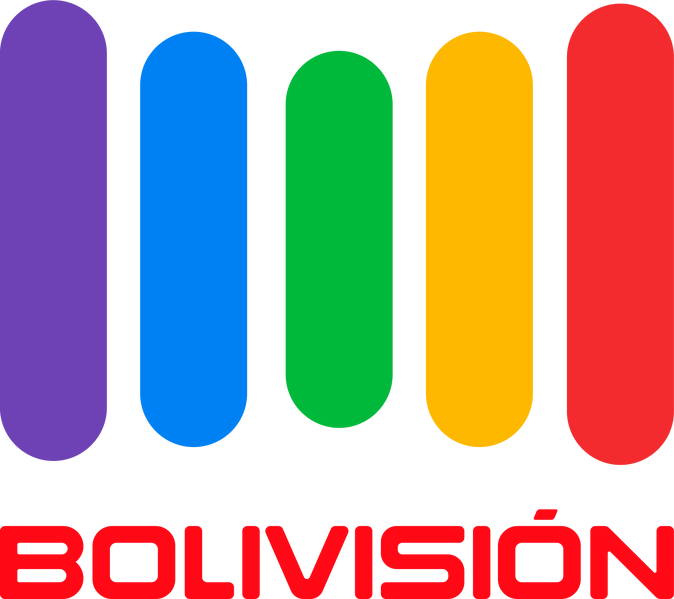
- Type: Free-to-air television channel
- Country: Bolivia
- Broadcast area: Bolivia
- Headquarters: Santa Cruz de la Sierra, Bolivia; La Paz, Bolivia; Cochabamba, Bolivia

Ownership
- Owner: Boliviana de Televisión, S.A. (Albavisión)
- Sister channels: UPP TV; RQP Bolivia

History
- Launched: June 17, 1997
- Former names: América Televisión (La Paz, 1985-1990); ABC (Asociación Boliviana de Canales) (1990-1995); Galavisión Canal 4 (Santa Cruz de la Sierra, 1985-1996); Antena Uno Canal 6 (Cochabamba, 1985-1997)

Links
- Website: redbolivision.tv.bo

Availability

Terrestrial
- Analog television: Channel 2 (Beni); Channel 4 (Sucre); Channel 4 (Tarija); Channel 5 (Oruro); Channel 5 (Pando); Channel 5 (Potosí)
- Digital: Channel 4.1 (Santa Cruz); Channel 5.1 (Cochabamba); Channel 5.1 (La Paz)

Bolivisión is a commercial Bolivian television station with its main station in La Paz. The channel was launched on June 17, 1997, following the dissolution of Telesistema Boliviano, and later the creation of Unitel and the beginning of its relations with Galavisión. The network is owned by Albavisión since May 2007; a period marked by the move of its flagship facilities from Santa Cruz to La Paz, as well as techonological advancements implemented by the administration.

== History ==
=== Background ===
On September 28, 1985, América Televisión, a terrestrial television channel owned by Banco Mercantil, was launched on channel 6 in La Paz, the Bolivian capital. With its studios in the Batallón Colorados Building, the station became one of the first private channels in Bolivia. The broadcasts became regular on November 3 the same year. Its owner was Miguel Dueri. With broadcasts lasting 6 hours in its first 2 years of broadcast, its transmission schedules progressively increased to 18 hours a day. América Televisión (unrelated to the Peruvian channel of the same name) was the first private network in the country to broadcast via satellite in 1994 and was one of the first to reach the 9 capitals of the department of La Paz. That same year, Ernesto Asbún bought 51% of the shares, with his wife obtaining 47%.

In 1995, Raúl Garáfulic (owner of Red ATB) terminated his contract with TeleOriente and stopped broadcasting on channel 9 in Santa Cruz. After the end of the partnership, Raul Garafulic bought channel 5 from Santa Cruz, which was part of the Asociación Boliviana de Canales (ABC). Consequently, ABC ceased to exist, for which the entire ABC network was subsequently sold to Ernesto Asbún, who had bought Channel 4 of Santa Cruz, Galavisión. Ernesto Asbún bought Galavisión with the intention of forming a network of stations. By doing so, the CDT network ceased its broadcasts on that same channel.

In 1996, a group of businessmen founded Boliviana de Television, with Telesistema Boliviano from La Paz, Antena Uno Canal 6 from Cochabamba and Canal 4 Galavision from Santa Cruz. Bolivisión was struggling due to the dominant position Red Uno and ATB held in the market, while the former ABC went through four changes in ownership. Asbún later associated with Carlos Cardona to form Bolivisión on channel 2 in La Paz. The partnership lasted a year and a half, thus dissolving the CDT Network. In 1997 and with the purchase of Telesistema Boliviano by Unitel, Bolivisión was left without a channel in La Paz.

In 1984, Galavisión launched in Santa Cruz de la Sierra on channel 4. Its programming was aimed at a primarily elitist audience with canned foreign programming, primarily centered on entertainment.

=== Beginning of operations ===
It was on July 17, 1997 that Bolivisión was refounded, and in September of the same year it returned to the air in La Paz through channel 5 VHF. Joining the stations that were already lined to the network were also channel 5 in Oruro, channel 4 in Tarija, channel 2 in Beni, channel 5 in Potosí, channel 9 in Sucre and channel 9 in Pando. The channel acquired the rights to broadcast the matches of the France 98 Qualifiers. Later, on Wednesday, November 26, it expanded by the same frequency in Oruro, broadcasting the Bolivar V.S. Wilstermann boxing match live at 7:00 p.m. Later, the station moved its studios to the fourth floor of the Shopping Norte in La Paz. Bolivisión previously broadcast sporting events such as the NBA that it presented on Sunday afternoons. In 1998, the network started producing Noticiero Bolivisión in place of the newscasts produced by PAT, which had just started its own channel.

=== New century and first financial crisis ===
Ernesto Asbún, its owner, was also the owner of Lloyd Aéreo Boliviano, which was going through a severe economic crisis. Until a long time, the general manager was exactly the prominent journalist from Cochabamba and director of the Club Deportivo Jorge Wilstermann Mauricio 'El Patato' Mendez Roca, who served as manager of the network until the sale to Albavisión.

=== New stage with Albavisión ===
Once LAB went bankrupt and before the judgment that was coming, Asbún sold Bolivisión to the Mexican Remigio Ángel González, owner of the Albavisión media conglomerate, who initially held 10% of the shares. Asbún later tried again on ATB in 2014, when it was under Prisa. The acquisition was finalized in May 2007, after four months of heated negotiations, with the promise of new capital flowing in. González visited the country later in the month, to see the new operations. Asbún subsequently bought a 25% share of ATB in 2014.

Due to the acquisition, starting in 2007, the channel's programming began to consist of Mexican and Brazilian telenovelas from Televisa and TV Globo, respectively. All national production that was not the news was fading. Bolivisión was also engaged in the digitization of its equipments, announcing the conversion of its playout to a tapeless operation in the trunk axis. Its La Paz station converted to tapeless format on March 16, 2009 and, in Cochabamba and Santa Cruz, it was expected that the process would be finished in May.

=== Relocation to La Paz and digital conversion ===
On July 13, 2010, Bolivisión ceased production at its Santa Cruz station due to a "technical collapse". Its employees, who had their benefits liquidated, demanded stabilization. This came following the collapse of its transmitting tower, damaging a large part of its equipment. As a result, programming was now produced from La Paz.

On July 4, 2011, Bolivisión unveiled a new look, introducing its new logo, a colorful set of tiles and the new slogan Somos parte de ti. Its newscast was renamed Bolivisión Al Día.

In 2012, it was the channel in charge of carrying out the international contest América celebra a Chespirito on Televisa. As of 2010, its programming on weekdays is mostly telenovelas produced by Televisa.

The network placed fifth in a ranking published by the IN Magazine in 2011, with 6% of audience share, ahead of the last place, Bolivia TV.

It also had plans as early as 2012 to begin providing its own uplink in the MPEG-4 standard, while other Bolivian networks with satellite coverage, uplinked by Entel, were in the MPEG-2 standard.

The channel aired 200 hours worth of the 2012 Summer Olympic Games, with live broadcasts throughout the day and tape-delayed leftover events overnight. The network pledged to broadcast the largest number of events live. In 2014, Bolivisión started converting its facilities to enable high definition production, at a time when Bolivia was sluggish in the implementation of digital terrestrial television.

In 2015, the channel began its operations in Santa Cruz with a regional studio, in order to expand its presence in Bolivia having regional news. Work was also underway to convert its facilities to 16:9 HD broadcasts, pending permits from ATT.

Bolvisión became the first commercial television network to downlink its HD signal from the Túpac Katari 1 satellite in October 2018. That same year, the stations in the trunk axis (La Paz, Cochabamba and Santa Cruz) started digital broadcasts, as part of the first part of the implementation of digital terrestrial television broadcasts.

Journalist Juan Pablo Guzmán left the network on May 2, 2023 due to concerns about government interference on Bolivian television, where officialist politicians are favored.

On May 29, 2024, its newscast Al Día introduced the first AI-generated news presenter, Adrián, dividing social media users.

Without prior warning, Bolivisión stopped broadcasting Televisa productions in October 2024. On March 10, 2025, Bolivisión unveiled a new, simplified version of its logo.

== Network ==
The network has twelve licensed stations, of which two are relayers. The stations are held mainly by Antena Uno and Galavisión. Antena Uno (from Cochabamba) holds the licenses for all departments (Bolivisión Cochabamba and Bolivisión La Paz) with the exception of the three stations in Santa Cruz which are under Galavisión (representing Bolivisión Santa Cruz).

City	Channel	Licensee	Notes
La Paz	5	Antena Uno Canal 6 S.R.L.	Bolivisión O&O
Santa Cruz de la Sierra	4	Galavisión S.R.L.	Bolivisión O&O
Montero	3	Galavisión S.R.L.	Bolivisión O&O
Warnes	33	Galavisión S.R.L.	Bolivisión relayer
Cochabamba	5	Antena Uno Canal 6 S.R.L.	Bolivisión O&O
Trinidad	2	Antena Uno Canal 6 S.R.L.	Bolivisión O&O
Sucre	4	Canal 4 Mundo Visión S.R.L.	Affiliate
Oruro	5	Antena Uno Canal 6 S.R.L.	Bolivisión O&O
Potosí	5	Antena Uno Canal 6 S.R.L.	Bolivisión O&O
Tarija	4	Antena Uno Canal 6 S.R.L.	Bolivisión O&O
Cobija	5	Universal de Comunicaciones Pando	Affiliate
Yacuiba	5	Cotelya	Affiliate

== Presenters ==
- Myriam Claros
- Vania Borja
- Héctor Uriarte
- Richard Pereira
- Pamela Muñoz
- Nicole Rosell
- Fernando Eid
- Carola Castedo
- Miriam Ramos

== Programs ==
=== Bolivisión Al Día ===
It is the main news program of Bolivisión. It airs Monday through Friday at 6:00 am, 12:40 pm and 9:00 pm. It is hosted by Carola Castedo from Santa Cruz and Miriam Ramos in La Paz. Its first broadcast was on July 6, 2011, replacing Noticias Bolivisión, previously known as Noticiero Bolivisión, which had existed since 1998.

=== Dilema ===
Game show presented by Hans Caceres and Leonel Fransezze, produced by Smilehood Media and Kontenidos Agencia Digital. Format where gaming and entertainment stand out with earning money. The program premiered in 2020 and is an adaptation of an Argentine format produced by Sinapsis for América TV, produced locally by Kontenidos Agencia Digital.

=== La Cancha de Bolivisión ===
Sports program hosted by Richard Pereira.

=== Revista Al Día ===
The channel's morning magazine program.

=== Infomercials ===
Paid programs related to the Curanderia.

=== Support of Bolivian movies ===
On March 22, 2025, Bolivian Film Day, the network aired the Bolivian movie Día de boda during primetime hours.

=== Sports ===
As well as covering the Olympic Games and the UEFA Champions League, there are other occasional sports telecasts. Ahead of the 2024 Copa América, the network gained the rights to air three friendlies of the Bolivian national football team in the United States.

=== Former programming ===
As Galavisión, it produced a variety show for Santa Cruz de la Sierra called Garabato in 1995, before the current network was formed.

Original productions:

As Galavisión:

- Cuentos navideños II: El nacimiento/El brindis (1990)
- Cuentos y leyendas del Oriente boliviano (1991)
- Una vida, un destino (1993)
- Cuentos navideños III: Papa noel se jubila (1993)
- La fundación (1994)
- Más cuentos y leyendas (1994)
- Una historia, una canción (1995)
- Luna de locos (1995)
- Cuentos navideños IV: Una navidad diferente Secuestraron al niño (1995)
- Tardes antiguas (1996)
- Cuentos navideños V: Martin, el zapatero/Sucedió en Belén/El juicio a Papa Noel (1996)

As Bolivisión:

- Casos en la corte (1998)
- Sueños de cristal (TV movie) (1999)
- Fuera de control (TV movie) (1999)
- Destruida para siempre (TV movie) (1999)
- Esta Boca es mía (2002)

== Sports events ==
- UEFA Champions League
- UEFA European Championship
- Olympic Games

== UPP TV ==
UPP TV is Bolivisión's sister channel, launched on December 11, 2020 and positioned as Bolivia's first digital-only television network. All of the content is original, the channel launched with 16 programs.

== Controversies ==
In 2007, shortly after Albavisión took over the channel, it started including paid text message services in some of its programs. One of the affected programs, DivierTV, was accused of receiving a thousand text messages per hour.

The network was also one of several to have been benefitted by the Evo Morales administration for the airing of government propaganda between 2017 and 2019. It and ATB did not inform of the transactions in 2019, after a video mixing two items supposedly dated from 2021 circulated on social media.

During the 2022 FIFA World Cup, Bolivisión dispatched reporters to Qatar. A member of the Qatari Police interrogated a journalist of the network, Roberto Acosta, because of the logo of the channel, which according to the police, resembled the LGBT flag. Acosta defended that Bolivisión's logo was "just a logo". One of the members of the police ended up apologizing Acosta.

On December 15, 2022, its reporting team in Guarayos was damaged by vandals.

A scam video using the Bolivisión Al Día graphics circulated in 2024 promoting Emily, "Bolivia's richest girl". The video was part of a cryptocurrency platform that was active on Telegram. Four exact videos, all of them looking exactly the same, were posted in the early days of July that year, and was based on a similar scam video originally meant to impersonate Argentine news channel Todo Noticias. The scam was already mentioned in an Argentine subreddit.

Hours ahead of the debate with the two candidates for the second round of the general election, Bolivisión left the combined broadcast, withdrawing network presenter Luciana Acosta in the process, justifying its withdrawal on the fact that each network should remain independent while selecting its representative.

In April–May 2026, a Facebook page called Bolivia Now spread misinformation using the visual elements from Bolivisión's Facebook photos to deliver news on a drug trafficking scandal, as well as an AI-generated image on a supposed report on Edmand Lara's health (incorrectly referred to as "Edman Lara"). In late August, a similar post featuring Casimira Lema circulated on WhatsApp groups attributing the network to an item on social media where she supported incumbent president Rodrigo Paz.

== See also ==
- Television in Bolivia
