= Telesistema Boliviano =

- Country: Bolivia

Programming
- Language: Spanish
- Picture format: 480i SDTV

History
- Launched: 1985
- Closed: 1997

Availability

Terrestrial
- Analog VHF: Channel 4 (Santa Cruz); Channel 2 (La Paz)

Telesistema Boliviano (TSB) was a television network in Bolivia that existed from 1985 and 1997 and was based in the capital, La Paz. A rift in the late 1990s caused its dissolution, coupled by the creation of two new networks: Bolivisión and Unitel.

== History ==
TSB was founded on November 22, 1983, as the first commercial television company in Bolivia. At the time of founding, TSB achieved the license to broadcast in La Paz on channel 2. The channel was the opposite of ATB (channel 9) in some way, as the channel provided "quality programming" over political preferences.

Experimental broadcasts started on February 12, 1985, before becoming regular on April 14, 1985, being owned by Antonio Maldonado. On weekdays the channel broadcast for seventeen hours on average (7am to 12am) and twelve on weekends (11am to 11pm).

TSB's main accolades were becoming the first television channel in Bolivia to broadcast 18 hours a day and the first to produce three news editions (morning, midday, evening) in contrast to Televisión Boliviana and ATB, which only started in the afternoon and produced only one news bulletin, which gave the station some success. It was also the first channel to produce news bulletins in the Aymara language, broadcast at 6am, presented by Donato Ayma and with a smaller recap in the same language late at night. TSB set up an affiliate in Oruro in 1989, TVO, which also broadcast on channel 2.

TSB took part in a CNN initiative in 1990 for Earth Day. The report sent to the channel was about the destruction of Bolivia's rainforests.

Carlos Mesa worked at the station until 1990, when he joined his own project, PAT. The network's direction was at the helm of Eduardo Pérez Iribarne, a Spanish-turned-Bolivian priest. Telesistema joined the trunk axis network in December 1992.

TSB-CDT broadcast the 1994 FIFA World Cup, of which its national football team took part. CDT was dissolved in March 1996, causing its stations to affiliate with the new Bolivisión network.
