= Cadena A =

Bolivian commercial television network

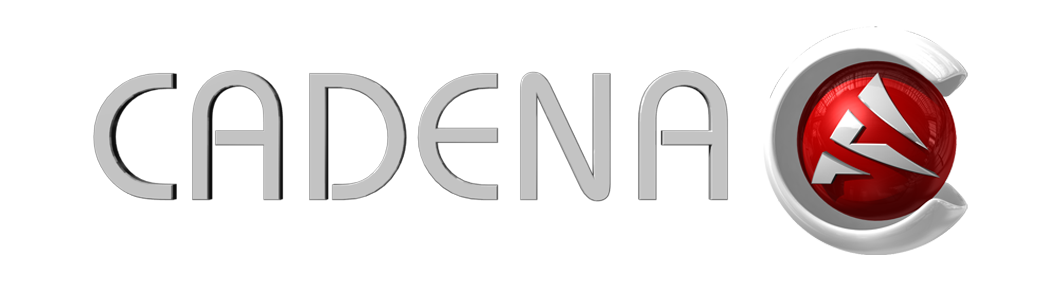
- Country: Bolivia
- Broadcast area: Bolivia
- Headquarters: La Paz, Bolivia; Santa Cruz de la Sierra, Bolivia

Programming
- Language: Spanish
- Picture format: 1080i HDTV (downscaled to 480i for the SD feed)

Ownership
- Owner: Compañía Comercial Minera Ricacruz Ltda (operated by Empresa de Comunicaciones del Oriente Ltda.)
- Sister channels: Unitel; Canal Rural Bolivia

History
- Launched: 1999
- Former names: Red Digital (La Paz, 1999–2003)

Availability

Terrestrial
- Digital UHF: Channel 3.1 (La Paz and Cochabamba); Channel 9.2 (Santa Cruz de la Sierra)
- Analog VHF/UHF: Channel 18 (Oruro, Potosí, Sucre, Tarija, Beni and Pando)

Cadena A (Network A) is a Bolivian commercial television network owned by the Ricacruz mining company and operated by Empresa de Comunicaciones del Oriente, owner of Unitel. Based in La Paz with additional offices in the commercial capital Santa Cruz de la Sierra, its programming is mostly original, coming from both locations, as well as news bulletins, infomercials, pais programming and, occasionally, canned foreign output.

== History ==
The network emerged in 1999 as Red Digital (Digital Network). In 2000, sports journalist Asbel Valenzuela joined the network; he got his own program El equipo deportivo in 2001 and was with the network until 2006, when he moved to Red Uno to present El Súper Deportivo. In November 2000, it premiered Axesso, which later moved to Bolivia TV. In 2003, the network adopted its current name.

On February 1, 2010, the network fired De mañanita presenter and network news head Jorge Tejerina. Erbol also reported the exit of Juan Carlos Arana, which implied an ideological change at the network. By 2011, the network was facing a crisis, with a series of staff quitting and moving to other outlets, such as Roger Romay in July that year (interviewed by Red Uno as leaving the network thanks to the end of co-production agreements; the network now resorted to producing all of its programs); to an extent where there were only two presenters left. At an unknown point in the 2010s, the Monasterio family acquired an unknown amount of shares at the network.

In August 2015, it finished its contract with John Arandia.

Cadena A reporter Irene Torres was attacked by followers of former president Evo Morales on September 17, 2024 in the Oruro-La Paz highway. One of the members of the group received threats to the reporter and damaging her credentials as a journalist.

On November 13, 2025, Cadena A moved from 2.2 (on Unitel La Paz's multiplex) in La Paz and El Alto to its own multiplex on virtual channel 3.1.

== Programming ==
As of 2024, the network airs a variety of original productions: Levántate Bolivia (morning program), Tele A Noticiass (news, only on weekdays), Estudio Estadio (sports) and Deporte Total. The network also airs a handful of imports, which at the time included reruns of anime such as Pokémon, Robotech and Bleach, as well as feature films. The amount of foreign content increased in 2025, adding shows such as She-Hulk and Beverly Hills: 90210.

In 2020, Canal 11 Paisaje in Riberalta relayed Cadena A's Tele A Noticias.
