= Unitel Bolivia =

Bolivian commercial television network

Unitel
- Country: Bolivia
- Broadcast area: Bolivia
- Headquarters: Santa Cruz, Bolivia; La Paz, Bolivia; Cochabamba, Bolivia

Programming
- Language: Spanish
- Picture format: 1080i HDTV (downscaled to 480i for the SD feed)

Ownership
- Owner: Empresa de Comunicaciones del Oriente Ltda.
- Sister channels: Cadena A Canal Rural Bolivia

History
- Launched: July 21, 1997
- Replaced: Telesistema Boliviano (La Paz); Teleoriente (Santa Cruz de la Sierra)

Links
- Website: www.unitel.bo

Availability

Terrestrial
- Digital VHF: Channel 2.1 (La Paz); Channel 13.1 (Cochabamba); Channel 9.1 (Santa Cruz de la Sierra)
- Analog VHF/UHF: See the section below

UNITEL (UNIVERSAL DE TELEVISIÓN) is a Bolivian commercial television network headquartered in Santa Cruz de la Sierra, La Paz and Cochabamba, Bolivia. It was founded in 1997 from the association of Teleoriente, founded in Santa Cruz de la Sierra in 1987, Telesistema Boliviano and CBA 13 TV; the main station Teleoriente also bought the two Telesistema Boliviano stations in La Paz and Oruro in the process. It is owned by businessman Osvaldo Monasterio Nieme. The company broadcasts sports, entertainment, political programs, and daily news programs nationwide in the South American country. As of 2020, it claimed to have the largest viewing audience.

The station is owned by Empresa de Comunicaciones del Oriente (Ecor), Ltda., which also owns two radio stations, the Bolivian branch of Radio Disney and since 2023, Eres Radio, specialized in love songs. The legal name of the main Unitel station is still Canal 9 Teleoriente. Grupo Monasterio owns 100% of the shares of Ecor.

== History ==
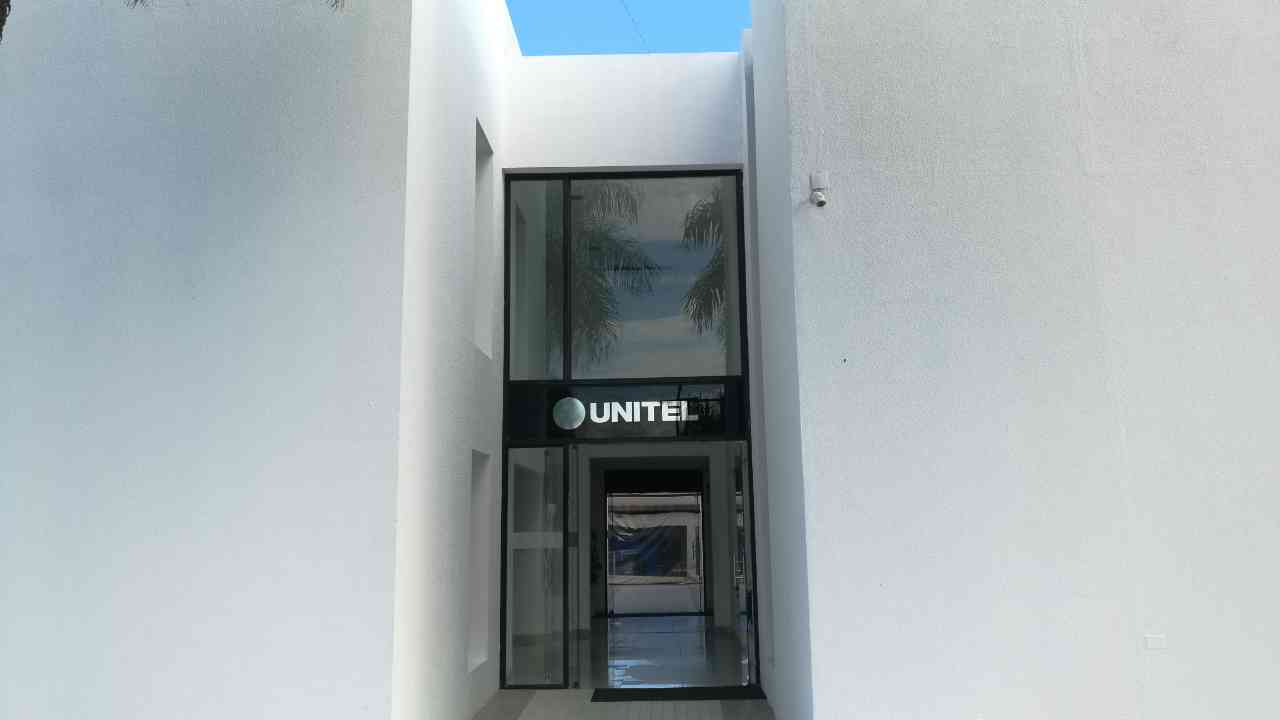
Unitel's central headquarters in Santa Cruz de la Sierra.

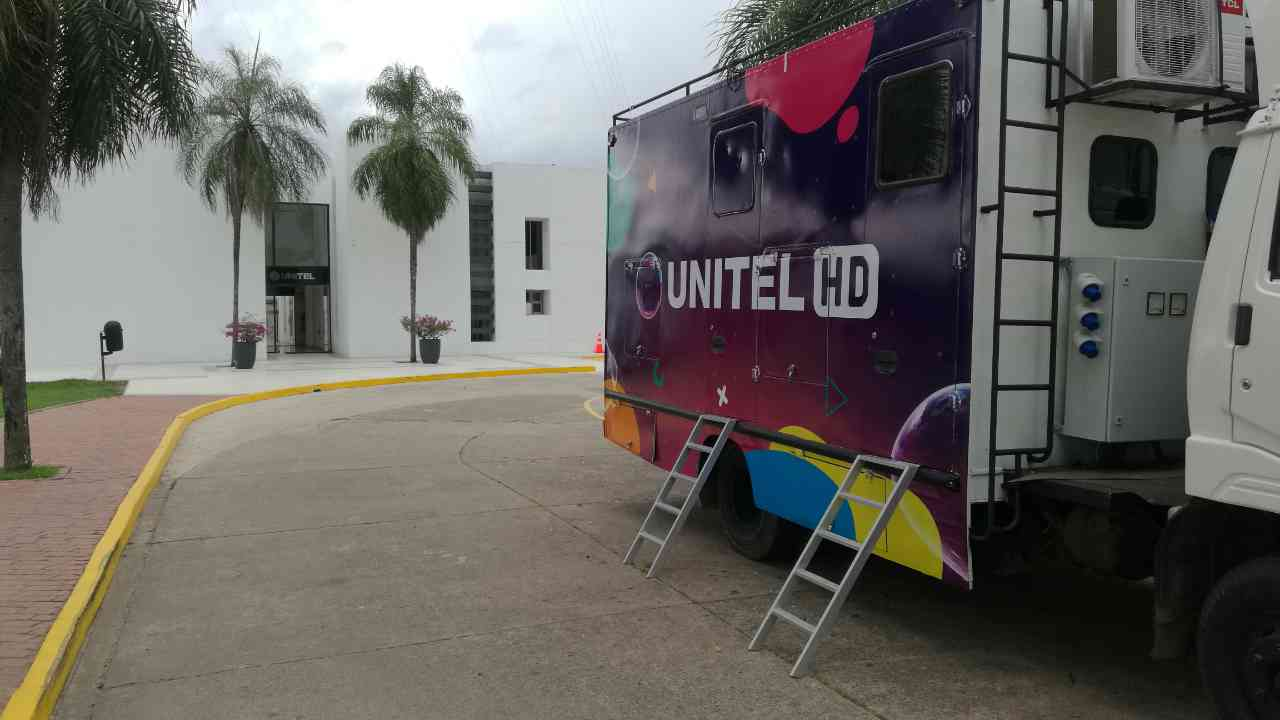
Mobile unit with the Unitel logo.

=== Background and predecessor networks ===
Telesistema Boliviano (TSB) was founded on November 22, 1983, as the first commercial television company in Bolivia. At the time of founding, TSB achieved the license to broadcast in La Paz on channel 2. The channel was the opposite of ATB (channel 9) in some way, as the channel provided "quality programming" over political preferences.

Experimental broadcasts started on February 12, 1985, before becoming regular on April 14, 1985, being owned by Antonio Maldonado. On weekdays the channel broadcast for seventeen hours on average (7am to 12am) and twelve on weekends (11am to 11pm).

TSB's main accolades were becoming the first television channel in Bolivia to broadcast 18 hours a day and the first to produce three news editions (morning, midday, evening) in contrast to Televisión Boliviana and ATB, which only started in the afternoon and produced only one news bulletin, which gave the station some success. It was also the first channel to produce news bulletins in the Aymara language, broadcast at 6am, presented by Donato Ayma and with a smaller recap in the same language late at night. TSB set up an affiliate in Oruro in 1989, TVO, which also broadcast on channel 2.

TSB took part in a CNN initiative in 1990 for Earth Day. The report sent to the channel was about the destruction of Bolivia's rainforests.

In Santa Cruz de la Sierra, the station was Teleoriente, which started broadcasting on channel 9 in February 1987. The station had small facilities, but had the ambitions to overcome limitations in the human resources and broadcasting sectors.

The station in Santa Cruz consolidated its position as a local television station when, in 1991, it affiliated with Red ATB, enabling its programs to be seen in seven of the nine departments of Bolivia. In 1993, the station introduced a new building, which as of 2008 was still in use.

=== Formation of the Unitel network ===
The channel originates from the purchase of ABC (Asociación Boliviana de Canales) by Illimani de Comunicaciones (Red ATB) and its subsequent sale to Tito Asbún, owner of Taquiña. In Santa Cruz de la Sierra, Red ATB terminated the contract with the Monasterio family, beginning to operate through channel 5. After several negotiations, the Monasterio group kept the shares of Telesistema Boliviano in La Paz and Oruro.

In April 1996, Unitel began broadcasting the CONMEBOL France 98 Qualifiers where it broadcast the away matches of the Bolivian Soccer Team against the teams of Venezuela, Peru, Colombia, Ecuador and Argentina live for all of Bolivia, as well as the Monasterio family channel broadcast the three games of those South American qualifiers for France '98 also live for all of Bolivia.

In June 1997, Grupo Monasterio acquired 50% of Telesistema Boliviano's shares, later that year, Cardona passed on the remaining 50% to Monasterio, consolidating the network in the favor of ECOR Ltda; in Cardona's words, this suspended the "Mexicanization" process of the television channels owned by Garafulic and Asbún (ATB, ABC Bolivia and the refounded Bolivisión).

The Monasterio-owned stations (Teleoriente and Telesistema Boliviano) started carrying a mostly uniform schedule from July 21, 1997, marking the beginning of Unitel in its current form. In addition to the two stations plus channel 2 (TVO) in Oruro, the network was available at launch on channel 9 in Sucre, 2 in Tarija, 5 in Potosí, 9 in Beni (TV D&D) and 11 in Pando (began operations in 1999), 13 (CBA 13 TV) in Cochabamba.

In September 1997, the new channel was officially launched via satellite and shortly thereafter it obtained national coverage. The new brand gave Unitel a modern outlook and aiming to take part in a globalized competitive market. In 2005, the Monasterio family adquiered the station in Cochabamba and its actives. Today, it is considered one of the largest privately owned television networks in Bolivia.

Unitel reserved local rights for two telenovelas from TV Azteca in June 1998, Demasiado Corazón and Perla.

In 2001, Unitel achieved the exclusive rights to air the 2002 and 2006 editions of the FIFA World Cup.

In 2003, Unitel consolidated its position with its viewing audience and advertisers, with total nationwide coverage in fifty locations, the nine department capitals and 41 cities with relayers installed.

The network signed an agreement with Caracol Televisión to air productions from its catalog in 2004. This agreement enabled Unitel to become Caracol's first choice to sell its productions to Bolivian television.

In April 2007, Unitel announced the shift to an entirely-tapeless system and a new transmitter for Cochabamba. The transmitters manufactured by Harris for the stations in Santa Cruz and La Paz were working without major flaws since 1996.

By 2007, Unitel had become one of Bolivia's three leading television networks, the other two being ATB and Red Uno. At the time, it had an exclusivity contract with TV Globo to air telenovelas from its catalog. From 2003 to 2007, the network had broadcast eleven titles: Esperança, O Dono do Mundo, O Rei do Gado, Mulheres Apaixonadas, O Clone, Celebridade, Senhora do Destino, Presença de Anita, América, Belíssima and Cobras e Lagartos. The contract lied mainly in the quality of its telenovelas, in contrast to those produced by Televisa, which were preferred by the lower class. In July 2007, the network was airing Belíssima at 9pm, after the evening edition of Telepaís.

According to a research held in the same year, Unitel had 51.7% of the market share, against 35.1% of Red Uno and 5.0% of ATB.

The offices of the Oruro station were damaged in August 2008 by a youth group with connections to Movimiento al Socialismo, forcing the station to stop producing the local edition of Telepaís the following month owing to lack of guarantees to assure its work.

Osvaldo Monasterio, founded of Unitel, died on 23 August 2011 in Buenos Aires. At the time of his death, he was the channel's highest executive.

Unitel's market share in 2011 according to the IN magazine (given as certain by other publications in April 2012) was of 36% (in the trunk axis), far ahead of Red Uno (21%), ATB (13%), PAT (8%), Bolivisión (8%) and Bolivia TV (6%).

In late January 2015, Unitel removed The Simpsons from its schedule in favor of the local edition of Calle 7, prompting protests in Santa Cruz de la Sierra, La Paz and Cochabamba against its removal. Within days, Unitel announced that the series would return to the channel from March 9 in its usual timeslot, which was between 4 and 6pm. The channel premiered the Portuguese telenovela A Única Mulher in 2016.

From 2 April 2018, the channel launched its own high-definition signal within the Bolivian digital terrestrial television system in test phase, until 15 April, when broadcasts officially started under the name of Unitel HD. In June 2018, the channel broadcast live 32 matches of the 2018 Russia World Cup in HD, becoming channel in Bolivia to do so.

In March 2021, Unitel removed all series that aired past midnight (being replaced by Pare de Sufrir).

In the midst of the broadcast of the subnational elections, Unitel signed with WarnerMedia and Sony Pictures, broadcasting the series The Looney Tunes Show, Tom and Jerry, the Justice League and the library of Columbia Pictures, as well as Sony Pictures Animation.

In May 2022, Ernesto Moreno left Unitel and joined Tigo Sports Bolivia. Its TikTok account was hacked on January 9, 2023 but was recovered by network technicians the following day.

== Canal Rural Bolivia ==
Thanks to a strategic alliance signed in September 2022 with Canal Rural from Brazil, a localized version of the channel, Canal Rural Bolivia, launched on September 16, 2022, available on cable television providers and on Unitel's website.

== Network ==
Unitel has a fiber connection from the central offices in Santa Cruz to the ones in La Paz. From La Paz, the channel generates its national signal by satellite. Unitel owns six television stations and a relay station; the rest being affiliates. As of 2002, there were no less than 46 stations affiliated to the network. The following stations relay the network's programming:

City	Channel	DTV channel	License	Notes
La Paz	2	2.1 (28 UHF)	ECOR	Unitel O&O, former TSB affiliate
Santa Cruz de la Sierra	9	9.1 (31 UHF)	ECOR	Unitel O&O, former ATB affiliate
Cochabamba	13	13.1 (43 UHF)	ECOR	Unitel O&O
Valle Alto	8	None	Canal 8 PATC de Integración Televisiva	Affiliate
Valle Alto	14	None	Vavizacli Comunicaciones	Affiliate (Valle Alto Televisión)
Trinidad	9	None	Compañía Beniana de Comunicaciones Dellien & Dellien	Affiliate (Unitel Trinidad)
San Borja	5	None	Canal 5 Borjana de Televisión	Affiliate (Borjana de Televisión)
Sucre	4	None	Canal 4 Mundo Visión S.R.L.	Affiliate
Sucre	36	None	Publicidad Global	Affiliate
Oruro	2	None	ECOR	Unitel O&O, former TSB affiliate
Cobija, Pando (Unitel Pando)	11	None	ECOR	Unitel O&O
Potosí	13	None	Illimani de Comunicaciones, S.A.	Affiliate
Tarija	2	None	Canal 2 Chapaca de Televisión	Affiliate
Tarija	29	None	Global de Comunicaciones Tarija	Affiliate
Puerto Suárez; Puerto Quijarro	9	None	ECOR	Unitel O&O
Montero	12	None	ECOR	Relay
Montero	51	None	ECOR	UHF relay station
Yacuiba	4	None	Canal 4 N Visión	Affiliate
Yapacaní	13	None	Ichilo Visión Canal 13 VHF (Radio Televisión Ichilo)	Partial affiliate

== Programming ==
=== News ===
Unitel's main news program is called Telepaís, with nationwide coverage and its own broadcast in the departments of Santa Cruz, Cochabamba and La Paz. Unitel exists since 1997 and many of the original journalists, presenters and collaborators moved to other channels, emulating its formula.

Since the 2014 general elections, the network uses the brand Así Decidimos for these special telecasts.

=== Sports ===
At launch, when its news service was named TV Noticias, its sports counterpart was known as TV Deportes.

The channel has owned the broadcasting rights for sporting events such as the Bolivian Professional Football League and the World Cups since 2002. However, it does not broadcast any league matches live, but rather resells the broadcasting rights to cable companies in Bolivia. In 2008, it broadcast the matches on cable in the trunk axis (Santa Cruz, La Paz, Cochabamba) and over-the-air in the rest of the country.

In June 2018, the Unitel Network broadcasts live 32 matches of the Russia 2018 World Cup by terrestrial signal, becoming the first television channel to broadcast a football world cup in HD quality for the Bolivian territory.

The network broadcast the 2022 FIFA World Cup held in Qatar alongside Bolivia TV and Red Uno. It had the rights to air the 2024 Copa América, limited to the opening match, Bolivia's matches and the final, using ESPN's Argentina-based commentators.

=== Entertainment ===
At launch, the networked carriage of telenovelas was irregular: the weekly schedule published on the July 20, 1997 issue of Presencia noted that each of the three stations aired different telenovelas in the same timeslot. The 1pm slot aired O Salvador da Pátria in La Paz and part of the network, Pasiones secretas in Santa Cruz and A flor de piel in Cochabamba; the 7pm slot aired História de Amor everywhere but in Santa Cruz, where Confidente de secundaria aired, and at 9pm, Irmãos Coragem in La Paz, História de Amor in Santa Cruz and Tropicaliente in Cochabamba.

Other networked programs at launch time were fully-networked though, such as the game show TV Bingo (Reyes Seleme), variety show Teleritmo (Sandra Parada and Edwin Pérez), Spanish game shows (Qué apostamos and El grand prix del verano, relayed from TVE Internacional) and imported TV series such as MacGyver, NYPD Blue and Serie Rose and feature films.

The channel also broadcast various beauty pageants, such as Miss Santa Cruz, Miss Bolivia, Reina Hispanoamericana, Miss Universe and Miss World from 1997 to 2016, from 2017, the rights were hold by Red Uno.

Since 2006, Unitel began broadcasting 24 hours of daily programming, though it wasn't the first channel to do so - channel 5 in La Paz had done a similar attempt in 1985 and channel 11, from 1996 to 1999.

In 2007, Unitel defined itself as a channel where telenovelas weren't dominant in contrast to other channels. While the channel aired four telenovelas daily, Red Uno aired more, whereas Unitel specialized mainly in five movie slots, broadcasting approximately 38 movies per week.

The channel stopped airing Cine sin cortes at 11pm on March 21, 2011, justifying its replacement by the move of its late edition of Telepaís to 11pm. On October 2, 2012, Insensato Coração moved to a 12:30am timeslot without prior warning, causing complaints from viewers. Unitel later justified the new timeslot (its old slot was replaced by the Peruvian telenovela Yo no me llamo Natasha) based on viewer surveys.

In mid-2013, it became the first Bolivian television channel to broadcast, with its own production, an international format from the production company Endemol, Yo Me Llamo Bolivia.

Since August 2014, the channel broadcasts the TVN's specialized gaming license program, called Calle 7 Bolivia.

At the end of February 2016, La Fábrica de Estrellas – Star Academy, a singing reality show produced in association with Endemol and hosted by Anabel Angus and Angélica Mérida.

As of 16 July 2018, Red Unitel premieres Despéiname la vida, the first telenovela fiction produced in Bolivia. This teleseries is broadcast in prime time with Grisel Quiroga, Ronico Cuellar and Susy Diab as the main stars.

In the context of the COVID-19 pandemic in Bolivia, the channel did not stop broadcasting Calle 7. The channel was forced to suspend broadcasts of the show on 3 April 2020.

Unitel started streaming its foreign telenovelas on its website in December 2020, in line with the revamp of its website.

On 11 July 2022, the transmission of MasterChef Bolivia begins, under the MasterChef kitchen franchise. A second season premiered on 17 July 2023.

=== Kids ===
Unitel launched a daily afternoon children's program, Chispitas, in 1997, presented by Fabiola Landivar, Angelica Mérida and the Chispitas doll, named after the show. It emulated the format of ATB's Sipiripi, before gaining an identity of its own, replacing the doll with a group of children doing choreographies and games. The format was replaced by Unitoons in the early 2000s, with most of the presenters returning, becoming a huge success. It ended in June 2005, being replaced by Chicostation. At launch, it was interspersed with cartoons, which at launch were classic theatrical shorts, DIC titles and the Highlander animated series. Chispitas aired on weekday afternoons and weekend mornings, the weekend airings were preceded by Jacky Show, presented by Jacky Jiménez.

Until 2021, the network aired Disney series, the last of which to air were Wander Over Yonder and Avengers Assemble.

=== Current programs ===
==== Original ====
- Chicostatión
- A Todo Deporte
- Decibeles
- El abogado del diablo
- Cine Aventura

== Controversies ==
=== General ===
The network is known for its high advertising costs (in contrast to the ones practiced by Red Uno), over-reliance on exclusive news items (particularly crimes) and heavy attention to agricultural businessmen, often disguised as "public interest information". The channel is frequently nicknamed "Unicruel" by viewers who show strong criticism. Unitel's partiality to the right was evident in the mid-2000s when viewers replied to the slogan Telepaís está donde está la noticia (Telepaís is where the news is) with Telepaís está donde está la mentira (Telepaís is where the lie is).

=== 2007 Cochabamba attack ===
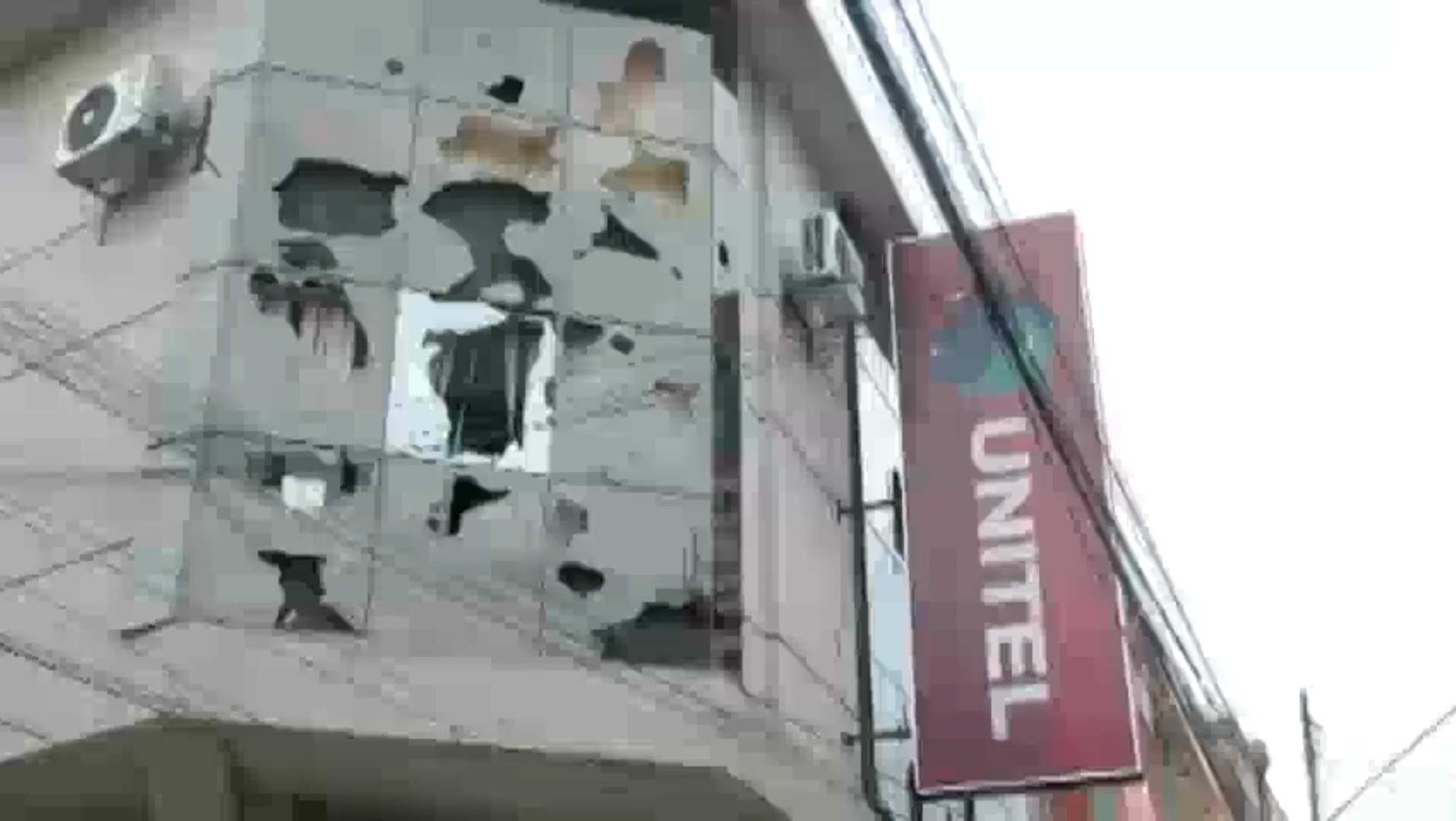
Then UNITEL Cochabamba studios attacked by the Movimiento Al Socialismo group.

Following the rise of Evo Morales, Unitel started taking a stance against the ruling government led by Movimiento al Socialismo. During the Cochabamba social unrest of 2007, the network was harshly criticized by people in favor of local separatist movements, creating graffitis against Unitel, accused of media manipulation.

A few days later, after January 11, that station and its then-studios got attacked by the Movimiento Al Socialismo group, at least two people were injured. Following the attack, the Unitel Cochabamba channel had to temporarily broadcast the La Paz feed until repairs could be made.

=== 2008 Yacuiba attack ===
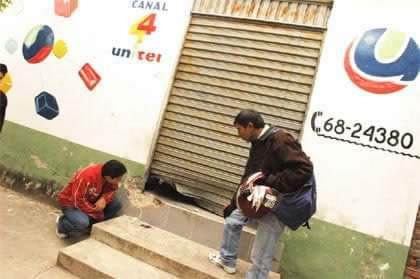
Place where the local police investigated the 2008 Yacuiba attack

On June 23, 2008, following a referendum in the department of Tarija, the building of Unitel's affiliate in Yacuiba was targeted by miners on strike, launching dynamite to the facilities. In August 2009, Peter Nava was absolved and police found no evidence that justified the crime.

== Logos ==
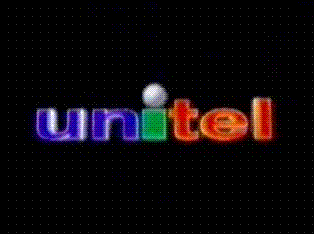
Unitel's first logo (1997–2001)

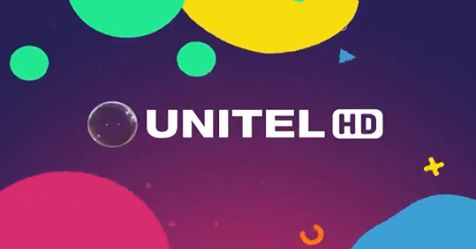
Logo for HD feed of the channel (2018–present)

== Announcers ==
- Waldo Montenegro (2009–present)
- Juan Carlos Diaz (since 2014, narrator and announcer of Telepaís)
