= Telepaís (Bolivia) =

Bolivian newscast

Telepaís is a Bolivian newscast produced by Unitel since the beginning of the network in 1997.

Its main header is located in Santa Cruz de la Sierra (where its newscast is natively produced) and it has editions for both La Paz and Cochabamba.

== History ==
Telepaís created after the launch of the current Unitel network in 1997. Initially it was known as TV Noticias (in June-July 1997), but due to copyright problems with Channel 24 (currently Red 24) in La Paz, which started its own news service early in the year using the same name, the new Unitel network had to change its name from September, as the flagship station wasn't aware. Its first presenter was Julio Cesar Caballero La Paz, who tried to emulate the format of Carlos Mesa. However, the format failed and after a string of presenters with mixed results, José Luis Pomacusi, arrived to change its formula.

The initial changes began in the way it was presentered. From the previous "talking bust" format that showed the name of the interviewee and their position, the situation was now clearly described, like Telefe Noticias. Data tables, showing prices, temperature, statistics, career paths, detailed news, etc. that were read out by the presenter were now included.

The style of Telepaís is considered controversial by other social communicators and in its beginnings (March 2001) was already classified as sensationalist. Despite these claims, its ratings were successful thanks to the impact it had on Bolivian commercial television. Many of the creators, journalists and presenters of the early phase of Telepaís migrated to other TV networks, bringing and emulating the formula.

In 2001, the network covered the situation of then-president Hugo Banzer Suárez, which at the time was diagnosed with cancer and went away for health reasons to Washington DC. Unitel dispatched Karla Revollo for this end, which were later sent daily to Bolivia, as well as his later return and death. In 2002, during the flooding of La Paz on February 19, Unitel sent all available reporters to the areas where the tragedy was occurring, while other channels continued to show its normal programming.

Telepaís is known for its exclusive reports, which are accentuated by video effects and music.

Telepaís changed its graphics on August 3, 2010, introducing new sets, a new graphic design and use of 3D technology. The theme music used for years (Trackdown by Network Music Ensemble) was rerecorded by the National Symphony Orchestra, led by maestro David Händel.

== Stance ==
Telepaís is partial to right-wing parties and is criticized by opposition audiences. This was already evident in the mid-2000s when viewers replied to the slogan Telepaís está donde está la noticia (Telepaís is where the news is) with Telepaís está donde está la mentira (Telepaís is where the lie is).

== Presenters ==
- Mariana García (Telepaís Espectáculos, 2015)
- Anabel Angus (Telepaís Espectáculos 2005–2007; main 2013–present)
