= Television in Bolivia =

Television in Bolivia arrived in 1967 and is one of the media that integrates the national population. Currently there are 185 stations or television stations in the national territory, most of which are installed in the city of Santa Cruz de la Sierra with 37 television media outlets. Currently there are 8 networks that cover the entire national area. There are also themed and cable channels.

== History ==
=== Early conception ===
In May 1961, the Bolivian government set up Televisión Boliviana (Televibol), a private company set to exploit television signals in the city of La Paz. Televibol also had plans to launch stations in other parts of the country and had the possibility of selling and servicing equipment once television launched. The absence of television in Bolivia until 1969 was derived mainly from the extant limitations of Bolivian radio, which had a lack of money and manpower. Communication problems between speakers of Spanish and speakers of native languages caused a language barrier. Few people in Bolivia had radio as of 1964. There were hopes for the radio infrastructure to be improved in order to assess the feasibility of a television station.

=== Development ===
Following the 1966 Bolivian general election, plans were already underway for a national television service owned by the government. Up until then, Bolivia was served by a small number of closed-circuit experimental systems. Provisions were made for the government to provide a one-year monopoly to the first TV station in Bolivia, scheduled to start before the end of 1966. The state had already reserved three frequencies, channel 5 in La Paz, channel 4 in Cochabamba and channel 3 in Santa Cruz de la Sierra. After the prospective first year period ended, the state would allow the creation of private television stations.

=== Early years and government monopoly ===
Given the rumors of the closure of Congress and the desire of the government of that time to have power over the country to become a dictator, President René Barrientos signed Supreme Decree 08395, on June 19, 1968, with which he founded the Bolivian Radio and Television Company (RTB), and later, with Supreme Decree 8571 (November 20, 1968) decides to change the name to Empresa Nacional de Televisión Boliviana (or by its acronym, ENTBOL).

Following Barrientos’ death, his vice president, Luis Adolfo Siles Salinas, assumed the presidency and continued Barrientos' project. At that time, a contract was signed with the Spanish company, INELEC, in order to advise and contribute to the installation of the State Television Channel. Many of the members of the technical team were members of the Spanish company, as well as the Bolivian Air Force, in addition to several equipment parts being brought from Spain.

After several test broadcasts, on August 30, 1969, the first television broadcast took place in Bolivian territory, with the creation of Televisión Boliviana based in La Paz and broadcasting in black and white. The monopoly was broken in 1973, when a television station was granted to the Higher University of San Andrés - Sistema Integrado de Televisión Universitaria.

=== Arrival of color television ===
Starting in 1976, more television channels were installed. In 1979 in Bolivia there were already 9 channels, 8 university television channels with regional coverage and one (channel 7) with national coverage. By decree of February 20, 1976, Bolivia adopted the PAL standard for color broadcasts, which, however, presented difficulties for existing equipment, and due to this, on August 1, 1978, it was established that Televisión Boliviana changed its color transmissions using the NTSC system. In April 1984, private channels began to appear and soon reached 35, in urban areas 18 and 17 had provincial coverage (10 private channels in La Paz and 25 channels in the rest of the country).

A microwave link connecting four cities (La Paz, Oruro, Cochabamba and Santa Cruz) known as the Red Troncal de Microondas (Microwave Trunk Network, "Trunk" as in the term "trunk axis" that connects these cities) was set up in 1977. There was intervention from the university stations, with the same law creating an umbrella network for these stations and creating one for Tarija.

=== Emergence of private television ===
Development of private television lagged significantly. The first private television station to be registered, Telesistema Boliviano in La Paz, was founded on November 22, 1983, launching in 1985. The first commercial television station to launch, Red ATB, opened on October 20, 1984, ending the government's monopoly on television. Both ATB (Paceña de Televisión), led by Raúl Garafulic and TSB, led by Carlos Cardona, were among the first such stations to do so.

At the time, shortly after the restoration of democracy in Bolivia, some private channels lacked regulation, opening illegally, and relied heavily on piracy to survive, such as Tele-Sat, channel 5 in La Paz, founded in April 1984. At the same time, the appearance of channel 13 in Santa Cruz de la Sierra (the current Red Uno de Bolivia) did the same. This led to the signing of Decree 21.060, aiming to liberalize the market and give commercial channels a license. In 1986, the government had received seven bids for private television stations in La Paz, of which only five could be legalized as both the state and the university already had their channels. By the end of the 1980s, La Paz alone had seven television channels, five of which were private, and foreign programming dominated in their programming.

A new phase began in the 1990s, with the emergence of new media outlets. This led to the domination of at least four commercial television networks, where the bulk of their programming was imported from abroad.

=== Digital terrestrial television ===
SITEL, the current ATT, held a symposium in 2007 regarding the possibility of introducing digital terrestrial television to Bolivia, "Hacia la TV Digital Terrestre".

In 2009, the government announced a phased roll-out of digital terrestrial television starting in 2012, with a prospective shutdown date of the analog signals scheduled for 2019. The initial plan was to select which system to adopt, granting a US$30 plan to install converter boxes.

After a memorandum of understanding signed with the Japanese government signed on July 20, 2010, the ISDB-T standard was selected as the country's default.

On April 8, 2018, ATT granted requests for sixteen television stations to begin digital terrestrial broadcasts in the trunk axis, with a deadline set for June 30. By the end of the year, 21 television stations in the three trunk axis cities were already broadcasting digital signals.

Per a new supreme decree in October 2024, ATT determined the beginning of the analog switch-off in 2026, ending in May 2030. The new dates were due to negotiations with television station owners and members of the population, who haven't still changed to digital. The metropolitan areas of the trunk axis cities (La Paz, Santa Cruz and Cochabamba) is expected to shut down on May 30, 2026.

ATT conducted three shutdown simulations in the first area to shut down the signals. The dates for these tests were:

- November 30, 2025, 10am-12pm;
- February 18, 2026, for four hours;
- April 30, 2026, for six hours.

== Television networks ==
=== National coverage ===
With the exception of Unitel, which usually broadcasts from its headquarters in the city of Santa Cruz de la Sierra, most of the channels have their operations concentrated in the Government Headquarters (in the department of La Paz). The channels Unitel, ATB, Red Uno, Bolivisión and (to a lesser extent) Bolivia TV; usually broadcast local newscasts, at least in the cities that make up the main axis (La Paz, Cochabamba and Santa Cruz). The only public network is Bolivia TV, the rest being controlled by private businessmen.

Their transmitting plants are commonly located in Ciudad Satélite, located in El Alto. This practice began when Telesistema Boliviano (today, Unitel) established its transmitting antenna in that place. The channels also own their own affiliates, with several exceptions; Red Uno does not operate in Tarija, Chuquisaca and Potosí, but licenses its operations to the company Comunicación Integral S.R.L., while Unitel operates through affiliates in the regions, in order to focus on the main axis, Oruro, Beni and Pando.

Logo	Name	Type	Slogan	Launch date	Owner	Operator
	Bolivia TV	Generalist	Nuestra televisión	August 30, 1969	Government of Bolivia	Empresa Estatal de Televisión Boliviana
	Bolivia TV 7.2	Entertainment	El canal de los deportes	May 29, 2012	Government of Bolivia	Empresa Estatal de Televisión Boliviana
	Red Uno de Bolivia	Generalist	Para todos	July 1, 1985	Grupo Kuljis	Red Uno de Bolivia S.A.
	Bolivisión	Generalist	Somos parte de ti	September 1, 1985	Albavisión	Antena Uno Canal 6 S.R.L/Galavisión S.R.L
	Unitel	Generalist	Unidos por la tele	February 21, 1987	Grupo Monasterios	Ecor Ltda.
	Cadena A	Generalist	Somos Bolivia, somos Cadena A	2000	Compañía Comercial Minera RICACRUZ Ltda	Ecor Ltda.
	Red ATB	Generalist	ATB, estamos de vuelta	October 20, 1984	ATBMedia	Illimani de Comunicaciones S.A.
	RTP	Generalist	La comunidad de la vida	May 10, 1985	Sistema RTP	Radiodifusoras Populares S.A.
	PAT	Generalist	Siempre junto a ti	September 15, 1990 (company); September 1998 (channel)	Abdallah Daher	Periodistas Asociados de Televisión PAT Ltda.
	CTV Red Nacional	Generalist	Conectado con la gente	June 25, 1996 (as Católica TV); April 21, 2023 (as CTV Red Nacional)	Copacabana de Televisión S.R.L. CTV S.R.L.	

=== Regional coverage ===
Channels with a presence in two or more departments but that, due to their technical or economic limitations, do not cover the nine departmental capitals of the national territory or do not have 90% coverage, excluding cable, satellite or internet television.

Logo	Name	Type	Launch date	Owner	Operator
	xto tv	Religious	May 15, 1992	Trinity Broadcasting Network	Sistema Cristiano de Comunicaciones S.R.L
	Red ADVenir	Religious	September 2002	Gospel Ministries International	Red A D Venir S.A.
	Abya Yala TV	Entertainmaient	November 2012	Fundación Abya Yala	Fundación JEMA
	Gigavisión	Generalist	November 15, 2005	Jorge Arias Vanegas	Gigavisión S.R.L.
	F10 HD	Generalist	November 23, 2020	Freddy Ticona Gonzáles	FFTV Comunicaciones S.R.L.
	Red DTV	Generalist	September 1, 2022	Jorge Junior Arias Paravicini	DTV S.R.L.
	ED24	News; Variety	September 29, 2025	Grupo El Deber	Editorial Santa Cruz S.R.L.

=== University channels ===
All stations are part of Red Universitaria Boliviana de Información unless otherwise specified.

- Televisión Universitaria UAP (Cobija) (2012) (independent)
- Televisión Universitaria UABJB (Trinidad) (1977)
- Televisión Universitaria UAJMS (Tarija) (1976)
- Televisión Universitaria UMRPSFXCH (Sucre) (1976)
- Televisión Universitaria UNSXX (Llallagua) (independent)
- Televisión Universitaria UATF (Potosí) (1981)
- Radio y Televisión Universitaria UTO (Oruro) (1978)
- Televisión Universitaria UAGRM (Santa Cruz de la Sierra) (1973)
- Televisión Universitaria UMSS (Cochabamba) (1978)
- UPEA Televisión (El Alto) (independent) (2017)
- Televisión Universitaria UMSA (La Paz) (1980)

=== International channels ===
These are international channels that represent Bolivia on several cable operators or terrestrial television of other countries

Logo	Channel	Programming	Owner	Member channels	Coverage
	BTV (relay)	Generalist	Government of Bolivia	Bolivia TV	Worldwide
	ATV Argentina	Generalist	Jaime "Jimmy" Iturri Salmon; Radiodifusoras Populares S.A.	ATB (2016-2019); F10 HD (2020-present)	Argentina
