= Croatian Bolivians =

Croats in Bolivia Hrvati u Boliviji (Croatian) Croatas en Bolivia (Spanish)
Total population
- 20,000

Regions with significant populations
- Santa Cruz, Cochabamba

Languages
- Bolivian Spanish, Croatian

Religion
- Christianity (mainly Roman Catholicism)

Related ethnic groups
- Other Croatian diaspora groups

Croatian Bolivians (Croatian: Hrvati u Boliviji; Spanish: Croatas en Bolivia) are one of the main European ethnic groups in the South American country, although their figures are not as large as those of its neighbours.

Croatian immigration to Bolivia was a migratory movement that traces its roots to the 19th century, which had some strong and important development in the history of Santa Cruz, which resulted in the settlement of the Chaco regions of central South America. The Croatian government estimates that the Croatian diaspora in Bolivia has an estimated 20,000 people, including immigrants and descendants of third and fourth generation.

== Migration history ==
The first Croatian immigrants, mostly from the province of Dalmatia, arrived between the mid-19th century and early 20th centuries. These immigrants settled mainly in the eastern region of the country, in the city of Santa Cruz; in Cochabamba; and in the southern region, around Tarija.

== Culture ==
There is only one Croatian-language teaching private initiative (Bolivian-Croatian school families Franulić).

In Cochabamba, there is Croatian home.

In La Paz, there is "La Paz Croatian community" (Hrvatska zajednica La Paz).

== Notable people ==
- Branko Marinkovic, businessman.
- Karen Longaric, lawyer, professor, politician and former Foreign Minister of Bolivia
- Rajka Baković, Croatian-Bolivian student and anti-fascist activist, who along with her sister Zdenka became known as the "Baković Sisters" during World War II.
- Mirko Tomianovic, professional footballer
- Ivo Kuljis, businessman and founder and owner of Kupel, Banco Económico and Red Uno de Bolivia

== See also ==
- Immigration to Bolivia
- Croatian diaspora
- Bolivians of European descent
