= Red Uno Sucre =

- Sucre; Bolivia
- Channels: Analog: 2
- Branding: Red Uno

Programming
- Affiliations: Red Uno

Ownership
- Owner: Red Uno de Bolivia; Comunicación Integral

Technical information
- Licensing authority: ATT

Links
- Website: redunosur.com

Red Uno Sucre (channel 2) is the Red Uno owned-and-operated station for the city of Sucre. It is the head of Red Uno Sur, a three-station network of Red Uno O&Os in southern Bolivia, jointly operated with Comunicación Integral, owned by Jorge Rada Salinas. Under CI, its sister stations are Panamericana Sur, a radio station, and TVO.

== History ==
A television station was already operational on VHF channel 2 in Sucre during the 1990s, having joined the Red Uno network in 1993. Its licensee was Cruceña de Televisión, the network's flagship. During the early 2000s, two of its staff were Carlos Flores Negrón and Mario Delfín Ustárez.

As of 2018, it employed ten staff, four technicians, three journalists (including cameramen) and three managers, including Salinas himself.

== Programming ==
Red Uno Sucre, as well as the three other Red Uno Sur stations, produced a local edition of Notivisión as late as 2024, as an insert on weekday evenings. This edition seems to have disappeared by January 2026. Previously, as late as 2018, it produced full local editions of El Mañanero and Notivisión Mediodía. The station does not produce programs on weekends.
