= Red Uno Oruro =

- Oruro; Bolivia
- Channels: Analog: 11
- Branding: Red Uno

Programming
- Affiliations: Red Uno

Ownership
- Owner: Red Uno de Bolivia

Technical information
- Licensing authority: ATT

Red Uno Oruro is the Red Uno owned-and-operated station for the city of Oruro. The station operates on VHF channel 11.

== History ==
It is unknown when did the station sign on; by the early 90s the station was under the Red Uno network set up by Ivo Kuljis. In its early years, it produced some local content, such as Comedia TV, featuring Viviana Garrón. It also aired Deportes en Acción, a sports news program, which during the 90s moved to Canal 5.

== Programming ==
As of 2024, the station produces the local edition of Notivisión, inserted in the national evening edition.
