= Red ADvenir =

- Country: Bolivia
- Broadcast area: Bolivia

Programming
- Picture format: 1080i HDTV

Ownership
- Owner: Red ADvenir SA

History
- Launched: September 2002

Links
- Website: redadvenir.org

Red ADvenir (also known as Red ADvenir Internacional, "ADvenir" derived from "ha de venir"), is a Bolivian Seventh-day Adventist television network founded in 2002 by pastor David Gates.

== History ==
In early 2002, Bolivian commercial television network Red Uno put up Red Mágica (Canal Mágico) for sale. The UHF network covered six cities, including the three main cities of the trunk axis, and was aimed at children. The network offered a price of US$1,500,000 for the buyer. The network's vice president talked to ADvenir's executives about their vision for the network. At the same time of the agreement, another organization wanted to buy the frequencies for just US$1 million. In order to operate, a property was needed. In addition, Red ADvenir was set to be advertised at launch on Red Uno as part of an exchange agreement, providing four 30-second spots during prime time hours. The final purchase included the six UHF licenses, its equipment, a property worth US$300,000, free use of one of Red Uno's transmitting towers for a year and a two-year agreement to carry spots for the network on Red Uno. The ceremony took place on January 31, 2002, and was also covered by its news service Notivisión.

David Gates arrived to Santa Cruz on April 29, but the lawyer for ADvenir hadn't arrived. David had received no money yet, and later talked to Red Uno's vice-president and treasurer. The members of the future network explained that its purpose wasn't commercial, but rather given towards Seventh-day Adventist religious beliefs. On June 5, 2002, Gates set for an appointment with the sellers.

At launch, ADvenir signed an agreement with the Three Angels Broadcasting Network to enable access to its programming. Since the beginning, the channel was made available on satellite, to target Latin America and Spain (over NSS 806). The network was eyeing for a September launch, and was already receiving digital equipment in order to put the new network functional. At the time, none of the major Bolivian networks had fully-digital facilities, making ADvenir the first to do so. Broadcasts began in September 2002, initially five hours a day on satellite, later broadcasting fifteen hours a day on the former Canal Mágico network. By the end of the year, its satellite uplink would extend to 24 hours. Even after its launch, Gates had not finished receiving payments from Red Uno. At the time, the channel had started becoming a success, an electronics store in La Paz had tuned all of its TV sets to ADvenir.

At the end of 2002, the viewership base increased from 500,000 to six million in Bolivia alone, with ten countries having reported receiving the satellite service abroad. The next step was to increase its coverage abroad outside of satellite, receiving contacts from Venezuela to carry the channel, in a country where violence dominates every main channel.

In March 2003, ADvenir signed a new satellite contract, this time with Intelsat 805, with a representative from the satellite company in Washington DC dispatched to Santa Cruz. This enabled the channel to broadcast its satellite signal 24-hours a day and have a wider reach. The final payment was due in the same month. The new satellite signal started on April 21, followed by an agreement to carry ADvenir's programming on Venezuelan regional station Telecaribe for four hours a day during prime time hours, as well as arrangements in El Salvador and the Dominican Republic.

In September, while the Bolivian economy was facing difficulties, Red Uno mortgaged ADvenir's assets and even accepted an offer to enable the network to carry some of ADvenir's output. Around October, its facilities were damaged by floods. On December 30, Gates finished his payments, otherwise the station would return to Ivo Kuljis, Red Uno's owner. Following the final payments, Pastor Remberto Parada was appointed director of the network.

In 2007, Red ADvenir started broadcasting a specialized version for Europe, from Spain, owned by the Orion ADvenir association.

The channel is also available using the Bolivian TKSat satellite, alongside its radio counterpart Radio Altiplano.
