= Ivo Kuljis =

Bolivian businessman and politician

Ivo Mateo Kuljis Füchtner (born 19 August 1953) is a Bolivian businessman and politician of Croatian descent. He is currently the owner of Red Uno de Bolivia, Banco Económico and the Hipermaxi supermarket chain.

== Biography ==
Ivo Kuljis was born on the early hours of August 19, 1953 to Mateo Kuljiš and Aida Fuchtner at the Eva Perón Maternity in Santa Cruz de la Sierra. Born left-handed, his name was initially Ivo (corresponding to Juan or John in Croatian) but, given his personality, his father gave him as his first name Ivo Mateo. As a child, he had a very active life, but was frequently monitored by his parents to adhere to moral norms. Ivo denied entering kindergarten due to the pretext that he was mixed and didn't like kindergarten dances, and upon seeing his determination, his educational career started directly in primary school, where he studied at La Salle College. Since he was left-handed, he had problems writing, and the school teachers ordered him to write with his right hand. He then started to learn writing with both hands. Upon leaving La Salle he moved to the Muyurina boarding school in Montero, where his interest for agriculture kickstarted. He graduated from Muyurina with an agronomical baccalaureate degree. While serving a year in the military, he helped teach at least five people how to read and write.

In 1972, after obtaining the baccalaureate, he travels to Niterói, a city adjacent to Rio de Janeiro, where he pursued higher education. At the Fluminense Federal University, he decided to study economics. He finished his studies graduating with an Economics degree and returned to Santa Cruz to develop his birth city.

On August 4, 1995, he started the Corredor Biooceánico Bolivia Integrando América project, where he later went to the port of Santos to take a trip from the Atlantic to the Pacific by ship. He then returned in São Paulo and was welcomed back by locals in Santa Cruz de la Sierra, and was later given a special medal from Gonzalo Sánchez de Lozada. The goal was to study the feasibility of an eco-corridor for Bolivia.

=== Business career ===
At the age of 8, Ivo obtained a chicken from a veterinarian at the cost of 30 Bolivian pesos and recovered the money from selling the eggs. Later in the 60s, he worked at the Manaco store, which was owned by his father, and became Ivo's childhood nickname, "Manaquito". He often helped during special occasions such as Christmas, where the customer base increased.

Using his knowledge from his stay at Muyurina, he started dedicating more to agriculture, where he set up huts dedicated to breed animals and the production of corn, wheat, soy, cotton, sorghum and others. Thanks to his responsibility in money management, he was the treasurer in his course and the organizer of parties, kermesses and even a travel, as well as using his extant resources to build a school and other social works.

In 1976, he started constructing what would be the paper company Kupel. At times, he had to invest all of his capital in the project. Divergences between Ivo and Cristóbal Roda, the latter being a builder of factories, advised Ivo that the Kupel factory wouldn't be built in a period of less than seven to ten months. Ivo insisted that he would have the factory done in 90 days, and if the target date wasn't reached, he had to pay US$3,000 to Cristóbal Roda. Ivo's team worked for 89 days, after which the factory was formally presented to the press within the deadline. Cristóbal Roda paid Ivo the sum of US$3,000 as promised. Kupel, which manufactured toilet paper, napkins, disposable diapers, sanitary towels and cardboard boxes, among others; gave over 300 people the chance to work, at a time when Bolivia was facing a dire situation.

In 1978, he helped launched El Mundo, Bolivia's first color daily newspaper. He was its vice-president for ten years. In 1979 he founded PROTEL (Producciones Gráficas y Televisivas), which produced programs for Televisión Boliviana, with the most advanced video and television production systems available at the time. The company produced commercials, documentaries and Telesemana for the state channel. In 1980, PROTEL became the basis of what would later become Red Uno de Bolivia. He started experimental test broadcasts in the early 1980s, but was closed due to lack of legislation. Later on February 2, 1984, he founded Cruceña de Televisión, whose broadcasts effectively started on April 1 the same year. Kupel entered a new stage by starting a paper recycling plant, an industrial and ecological advancement in the city. The crisis in the early 80s left Kupel intact, but had to form a labor union in order to prevent the escalation of a crisis. COB laborers threatened to close the plant, but Ivo was against it. In the agricultural field, he created Avicruz, an incubation facility. In 1984, he creates the Private University of Santa Cruz de la Sierra, at a time when Bolivia was facing an educational crisis, and diversified Kupel to include a baccalaureate program and a basketball team.

The legalization of private television in Bolivia led to the formal creation of Unión Nacional de Organizaciones Televisivas (Red Uno), using his extant station in Santa Cruz as basis. In 1996 he created Canal Mágico, a UHF network for children. He founded Banco Económico in 1989, which started operating on February 7, 1991.

In 2016, he became the only businessman to receive Decree nº 2887 to manufacture PET bottles in a virtual monopoly. The norm affected EMPACAR. EMPACAR established a plant in Cochabamba in February 2023 to make recycled plastic bottles. In 2024, Kuljis, through EMPACAR, reacquired the Kupel plant.

=== Political career ===
Ivo Kuljis supported Carlos Palenque's CONDEPA in the 1993 Bolivian general election, the party ended in third place with only 14.29% of the votes. He led the Solidarity Civic Unity campaign for presidency in 1997, with Juan Chahín as his running mate, ending in fifth place. In both cases, he used Red Uno to promote his campaign. In 2002, he was the running mate of New Republican Force candidate Manfred Reyes Villa. He used the money from Canal Mágico, put up for sale, to finance his campaign.

His electoral campaigns were seen as failures, but thanks to the relations he had with the parties he worked with, his assets boosted.

== Personal life ==
In his childhood, he lived in a large house at the El Arenal neighborhood. While attending the Muyurina College, he won the shot put and freestyle swimmeing competitions at the school olympics.

In his final year of high school, he joined pre-military drafting with his friend Zvonko Matković.

After founding Kupel, he became professor at the Gabriel René Moreno University as the head of the Introduction to Economics course.

Ivo married Marilyn Cochamanidis Canelas in 1979; from this union he got four children: Jessica, Ivo, Mateo and Juan Pablo.

== Accolades ==
- Businessman of the Year 1995 (shared with Joel Mendes Rennó)
- Illustrious Child of Santa Cruz 2023
