= Televisión Universitaria UMRPSFXCH =

Televisión Universitaria
- Country: Bolivia
- Broadcast area: Sucre
- Affiliates: Red Universitaria Boliviana de Información
- Headquarters: Sucre, Bolivia

Ownership
- Owner: Royal and Pontifical Higher University of San Francisco Xavier of Chuquisaca

History
- Launched: December 31, 1976 (49 years ago)

Links
- Website: Official website

Availability

Terrestrial
- Analog VHF: Channel 13 (Sucre)

Televisión Universitaria UMRPSFXCH, also known as TVU Sucre, is a Bolivian terrestrial television station owned by the University of San Francisco Xavier, in Sucre, the Bolivian constitutional capital. The station is part of Red RUBI and was the first television station available in Sucre. The station has nationwide coverage using the Túpac Katari satellite.

== History ==
On August 28, 1974, university rector Dr. Luis Rivera Cortez founded the television unit of the university as a closed circuit system. All of the programs produced in this phase were generated from the university's central building, where locals took part without restriction. The transmission equipment was donated by the National Council of Higher Education (CNES), with the commitment to expand the donation in order for TVU to broadcast an over-the-air signal.

The new version of TVU Sucre was founded in March 1976, after talks with Rev. Philip Bourret, president of the Educational Development Corporation. Over-the-air broadcasts started on December 31, 1976, becoming Sucre's first television station. In 1976, 280,824.80 bolivianos were used in equipment and implementation, in addition to 40,000 bolivianos in remodeling of the premises and 146,000 bolivianos in the acquisition of a plot of land in the Poconas area (where the TVU building is currently located) to build its own premises. In 1977, Televisión Boliviana started broadcasting in Sucre by installing a repeater station.
