= Televisión Universitaria UMSS =

Televisión Universitaria
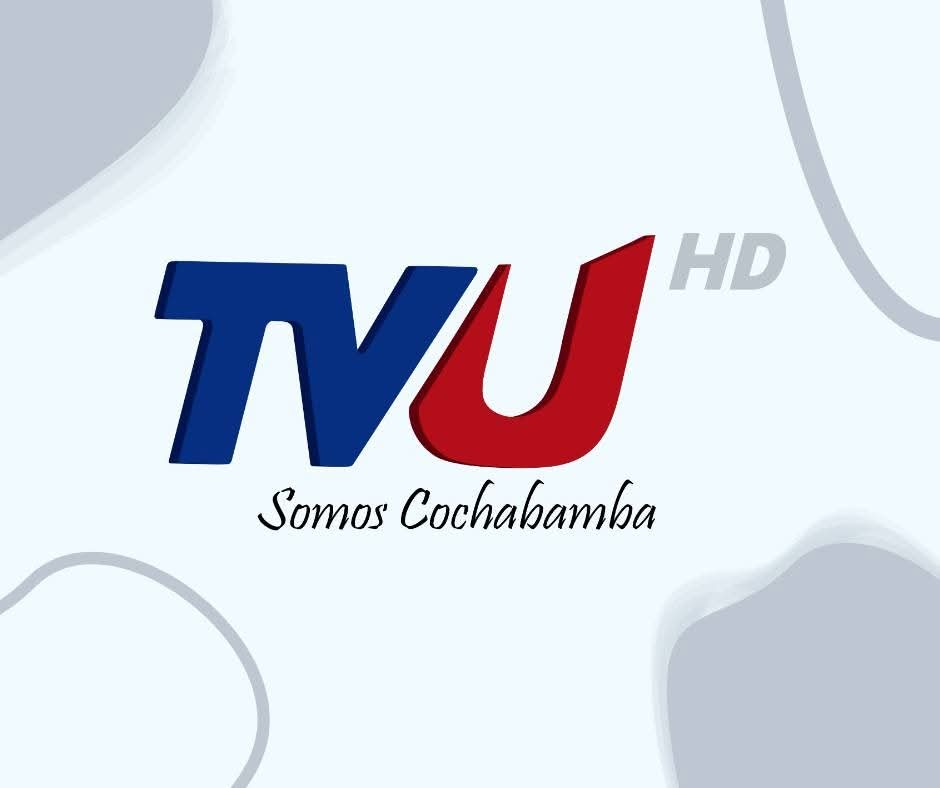
- Country: Bolivia
- Broadcast area: Cochabamba
- Affiliates: Red Universitaria Boliviana de Información
- Headquarters: Cochabamba, Bolivia

Ownership
- Owner: Higher University of San Simón

History
- Launched: May 5, 1978 (48 years ago)

Links
- Website: Official website

Availability

Terrestrial
- Analog VHF: Channel 11 (Cochabamba)
- Digital VHF: Channel 11.1 (Cochabamba)

Televisión Universitaria Cochabamba is a Bolivian terrestrial television station owned by the Higher University of San Simón. The station is part of Red RUBI.

== History ==
The Higher University of San Simón's television station was the first local station to sign on in the city of Cochabamba, as TVB set up relays of the signal direct from La Paz. It was set up on December 19, 1975, as a closed-circuit educational television station using a 100-watt transmitter to broadcast. It was created by means of Rectoral Resolution No. 485/74 of March 26, 1978. Its first manager (from 1974) was Jorge Rivero Torrico. Torrico was replaced in 1978 by Luis Gonzales Quintanilla, who was in the position until 1980.

On September 20, 1976, the university's authorities requested Eng. Julio Trigo Méndez, Minister of Transport and Communications to operate a terrestrial television channel, as work for a closed-circuit service was economically unfeasible. On May 5, 1978, the terrestrial broadcast on channel 11 started with the broadcast of a soccer match that was made in association with Televisión Boliviana.

In its early years, 60% of its programming was of its own production. Such programs included “Maribel”, children's program directed by Maribel Pérez Beltrán; “Carlín, el estudioso” directed by Carlos Balderrama; “Curiosidades del ayer”, directed by Ramón Rocha Monroy and Elizabeth Marín; “Surcos de mi tierra”, directed by César Céspedes; “Mi escuela” presented by Nicolas Serrudo, with visits made to schools; “Vamos juventud”, directed by Ramón Rocha Monroy and presented by Henry Llanos; and “Movimiento Político”, led by Myrtha Fernández de Laserna. The station worked with the Portales Pedagogical and Cultural Center for the broadcast of “El Chasqui”, “Matemática moderna”, “Fiestas folklóricas”, “Caravana de artistas”, led by Hector Ramos; “The Ark of Hope”, presented by Raúl Guzmán; Toto Arévalo, Adolfo Mier Rivas and José Oropeza de los Llanos presented “Estudio 95”. “Deporte Total” had its first cycle on the channel, presented by Toto Arévalo.

In mid-1982, when unrestricted general amnesty was declared, Luis Gonzales returned from Mexico Quintanilla and made contact with Mexico's Televisa, to send content. The station bought its first two telenovelas, El Carruaje and La Colorina, as well as El Chavo del Ocho. In addition to those programs, a contract was signed with TV Globo for the carriage of its Spanish-dubbed catalog, with early titles including Pecado Capital, Dona Xepa and Dancin' Days. Transtel's catalog was also aired, especially its coverage of German soccer. The station also received many Bolivian artists and some from abroad. Plays and circus shows were recorded at the Achá Theater and other locations.

The station was a training school for professionals that later joined Bolivia TV, Red ATB and Bolivisión.

In May 2015, TVU briefly shut down due to problems with its staff, which was a target of constant aggressions from students.

In 2017, in line with the 39th anniversary of the station, plans were announced to convert its transmitting equipment to digital. Dr. César Cabrera was appointed as the new president of the channel.

On November 11, 2019, following the resignation of Evo Morales, students took over the TV station's facilities to demand the firing of Juan Rios, who had links to Morales.

The digital signal launched on October 12, 2023. The project cost over 4 million bolivianos.
