= Red Uno Santa Cruz =

- Santa Cruz de la Sierra; Bolivia
- City: Santa Cruz de la Sierra
- Channels: Digital: 35; Virtual: 13.1
- Branding: Red Uno Santa Cruz

Programming
- Affiliations: 13.1: Red Uno

Ownership
- Owner: Grupo Kuljis (Red Uno de Bolivia S.A.)

History
- Founded: 1984
- First air date: 1 April 1984
- Former channel number: Analog: 13 (VHF, 1984-2026)
- Former affiliations: Independent (1984-1989); Red Tricolor/ATB (1985-1987); Teleandina (1987-1989)

Technical information
- Licensing authority: ATT

Red Uno Santa Cruz is a Bolivian television station licensed to Santa Cruz de la Sierra. Operating on VHF channel 13 (digital channel 35, PSIP 13.1), it is both an owned-and-operated station and the flagship station of Red Uno de Bolivia, and one of the oldest private television stations in the country.

== History ==
Cruceña de Televisión (Channel 13) was established on 2 February 1984 and launched on 1 April 1984, owned by Ivo Kuljis, who had previously founded the first private television production company in Bolivia, PROTEL, in 1979, and did experimental test broadcasts in the early 80s without falling under the legislation of the time. Until then, Santa Cruz only had two television stations, channel 7 from the government's Televisión Boliviana (still in black and white) and channel 11 from UAGRM (in full color). Broadcasting hours and signal reach were limited, yet it became the first private television station in the city. Its programming at launch time consisted largely of educational and cultural feature films.

Due to the licensing restrictions imposed by a decree of the time, the Supreme Government of the Republic was set to close its operations. However, the mayor of Santa Cruz, Velarde, supported the station with the help of other civic institutions, civilians and private entrepreneurs who thought the station was of benefit to the local population and, by extension, would support Cruceña de Televisión in its regular broadcasts and would oppose the government in silencing its operations. During July 1984, local inhabitants supported it as a means of information and culture.

In 1985, announcer Gloria Morales joined the station. Journalist Jorge Arias left in 1996 and founded the first UHF channel in the city, Megavisión. In the same year, Ivo Kuljis launched Canal Mágico on UHF channel 42.

The station bought a 10 kilowatt Harris Platinum transmitter in March 2006, marking the start of its digitization program.

== Technical information ==
Channel	Video	Aspect	Short name	Programming	Note
13.1	1080i	16:9	Red Uno HD	Red Uno (Main Programming)	Commercial Broadcast

Red Uno Santa Cruz started its HD signal in 2018.

The station was initially going to shut down its analog signal over VHF channel 13 on May 30, 2026, following the official ATT roadmap, where the analog signals in the three trunk axis capitals were intended to switched off. This was ultimately delayed to August 28. The station shut down its analog signal at 12:00 a.m. (Bolivian Time) on August 29, 2026, after 42 years of analog broadcasting. The digital signal continued to broadcast on its UHF channel 35, using virtual channel 13.1
