= Televisión Universitaria UMSA =

Televisión Universitaria
- Country: Bolivia
- Broadcast area: La Paz
- Affiliates: Red Universitaria Boliviana de Información
- Headquarters: La Paz, Bolivia

Ownership
- Owner: Higher University of San Andrés

History
- Launched: December 24, 1980 (45 years ago)

Links
- Website: Official website

Availability

Terrestrial
- Analog VHF: Channel 13 (La Paz)
- Digital VHF: Channel 13.1 (La Paz)

Televisión Universitaria UMSA is a Bolivian terrestrial television station owned by the Higher University of San Andrés, itself headquartered in La Paz, the capital and seat of government. The station is part of Red RUBI.

== History ==
TVU is the second-oldest television channel in La Paz, after Televisión Boliviana, which until 1980 was the only television station in the city.

Between 1976 and 1980, Bolivia was setting up a network of university television stations. While these stations were funded by the government, they had independent management. In this context, in 1979, the Higher University of San Andrés, which had obtained its autonomy the previous year, founded its television station under the auspices of the National Council for Higher Education, with experimental broadcasts in closed circuit. By means of Supreme Decree nº 16800, the station's first terrestrial broadcast was held on December 24, 1980, when the station formally launched, on VHF channel 5 (currently occupied by Bolivisión), with a 1Kw transmitter and a daily schedule running from 5:30pm to 10pm. It is unknown when did the station move to the current frequency (channel 13).

The station operated fine between 1982 and 1986, while on August 28, 1986, some masked men, likely agents of the Ministry of the Interior, raided the station's transmission plant located in an unprotected shed in El Alto, accusing the station of supporting the March for Life of the mine workers. They destroyed radio equipment and the microwave link and stole a modulator from the transmitter. On the same day and at the same time, the “Qalamarka Siege” was completed to stop and then disperse the miners. The station's staff protested over the attack and demanded for reparation for the damage, but nothing, including a formal investigation on the affair, was achieved. The station resumed its broadcasts shortly afterwards, but there was no modulator to finish the process, as it cost US$1,500.

Even after the introduction of private television stations in the mid-1980s, TVU was still tied to a political party, much like TVB having relations to the party in power at the time. Only in 1987, TVU was able to install a new transmitter, doubling its power to 2kW. Broadcasts from the new transmitter started on November 29, 1989, but they didn't become regular until May 1990, after a series of tests. By the early 2010s, the channel was added to COTEL TV and Multivisión's cable offers.

In January 2016, TVU started broadcasting from its new headquarters. The channel became the new home of the political talk show El Pentágono in 2017, which had moved from Red PAT.

== Network ==
Stations given to Red Universitaria de información
Location	Channel
Trinidad	11
Sucre	13
Cochabamba	11
La Paz	13
Oruro	13
Llallagua	SRTV
Potosí	9
Santa Cruz de la Sierra	13
Tarija	9
