= Cristal de Televisión =

- Santa Cruz de la Sierra; Bolivia
- Channels: Analog: 2; Digital: 26; Virtual: 2.1
- Branding: Cristal TV

Programming
- Affiliations: Independent

Ownership
- Owner: Centro Zoom Producciones

History
- First air date: 1985

Technical information
- Licensing authority: ATT

cristal de Televisión, also simply known as Cristal, is an independent television station in Santa Cruz de la Sierra. The station operates on VHF channel 2 (digital channel 26, PSIP 2.1).

== History ==
Luis Soruco founded the station in 1985. In order to reach a wider public, on October 25, 2011, Cristal TV changed its schedule with the arrival of new presenters and programs. On January 21, 2013, it started airing Javier Encinas Presenta, a nightly entertainment program produced by Encinas Films. In 2014, after four years outside of television, founder Soruco returned to Cristal presenting Confidencial, a combined news, sports and entertainment magazine.

The station started broadcasting its digital HD service in 2018, as one of the 21 channels in the first tranche of digital licenses issued by ATT. As of 2019, it aired Amanecer boliviano, which had been airing since 1990, which first aired on Televisión Universitaria UAGRM.
