= La Virgen de las Siete Calles (TV series) =

Bolivian television series

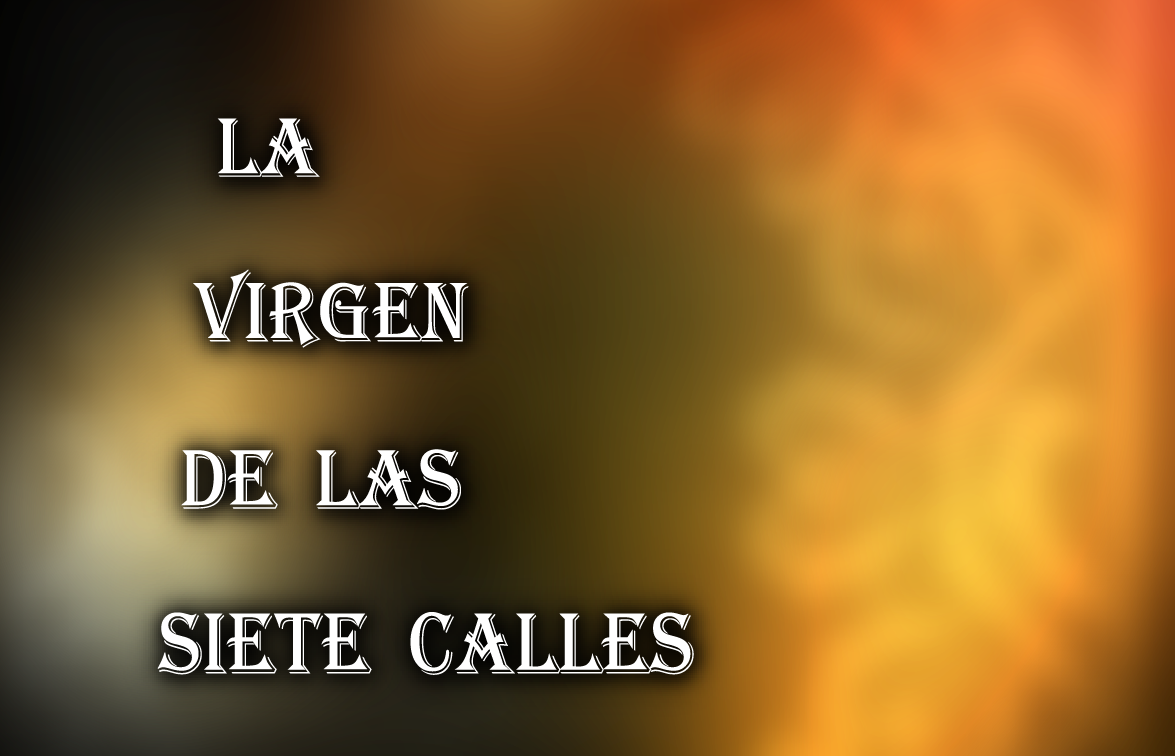
- Genre: Telenovela; Dramatic television series
- Created by: Author: Alfredo Flores; Adaptation: Enrique Alfonso
- Directed by: Juan Miranda
- Starring: Marisol Mendez; Juan Carlos Zambrana
- Opening theme: Lágrimas y sonrisas (by Erwin Vaca Pereyra)
- Country of origin: Bolivia
- Original language: Spanish
- No. of seasons: 1
- No. of episodes: 15

Production
- Executive producer: Enrique Alfonso
- Producer: Enrique Alfonso
- Production location: Santa Cruz de la Sierra
- Cinematography: Various
- Camera setup: Multi-camera
- Running time: 45 min.
- Production company: SAFIPRO

Original release
- Network: Cruceña de Television (Red Uno de Bolivia)
- Release: 2 August – 8 November 1987

Related
- Despéiname la vida Sigo siendo el rey

La Virgen de las Siete Calles (Spanish for: The Virgin of the Seven Streets) is a Bolivian telenovela adapted from a novel with the same name by Alfredo Flores. Produced by Santa Cruz Films Productions in 1987 with a total of 15 chapters, the TV drama was adapted for television and directed by Enrique Alfonso and Juan Miranda.

== Synopsis ==
It tells the story of Zora Abrego, only daughter of Antorio and Aurora, who died in a hunting accident and fire. After losing her parents, Zora is in the charge of her aunt Paulina, who hated the girl because she envied the life of Aurora. When Zora, the "Virgin", matures, she is virtually sold by her aunt to Juvenal Roca, who after a while fleeing after committing a crime. Zora meets the newcomer Carlos Toledo at a party. Romance develops between them after the return of Juvenal, but ends in tragedy.

Profile of the characters

- Zora Abrego, a beautiful woman who received the nickname "The Virgen of the Seven Streets" because, since childhood, her features were so perfect that she compared her with a Virgin by the residents of the area "The 7 streets" (Las Siete Calles) of Santa Cruz at 1920. Her blue eyes and honey-colored hair gave him such a characteristic that differed from the other girls.
- Carlos Toledo, a young student, returning from Buenos Aires after several years to fix an economic problem that prevented him from completing their studies.
- Juvenal Roca, is a man without scruples that has interest by Zora, convinces her aunt Paulina to take her. He has no affection and often humiliates her.

=== Production ===
- It was one of the first drama miniseries produced in Bolivia.
- Both the literary and television production were well received by the public Santa Cruz of Bolivia.
- The book has again gathered force through the TV series, but in television production only presented the story of manners and love, leaving aside the social background that is described in the novel.
- The background music was played by outstanding musicians in the middle known as José René Moreno (on guitar), the synthesizer Pablo Orellana & Otto Rau. The opening theme was an instrumental song played on harmonica.

Broadcasting

Megavisión Channel 18 (re-released in 2007)

== Cast ==
in order of opening

Actor/Actress	Character
Marisol Mendez	Zora Abrego / Aurora
Juan Carlos Zambrana	Carlos Toledo
Agustín Saavedra	Juvenal Roca
Efraín Capobianco	Juan Bravo
Carlos Jordán	Alberto Chavez
Betty Justiniano	Paulina
Eduardo Galarza	Antonio
Claudia Alfonso	Zora Abrego (child)
María del Carmen de Alfonso	Ms. Concepción
Frida Soria	Aunt Petrona
Etelvina Peña	Aunt Virginia
Antonio Anzoategui	Coloreta Gutiérrez
Danny Matiezo	Rosa
Enrique Alfonso	Diego Marañon
Raúl Bauer	Ramirito
Sandra Sorich	Carolina
Sandra Mercado	Alicia
Marcia Capobianco	Josefina
Luis Valenzuela	Aurelio Ortiz
Jaime Sebastián	
Delmiro Vargas	
Jorge Flores	
Bernardo Céspedes	
Luis Valenzuela	
Lorgio Jordan	
Roxana Capobianco	
Genoveva Quevedo	
Monica de Urey	
Marcia Capobianco	
Sandra Mercado	
Sandra Sorich	
Franz Viscarra	
Fanny De Alfonso	
Udalrrico Zambrana	
Willie Grunbaum	
Rosa María Barba	
Marcela Escalante	
Joao Jose Antonio	
Enrique Amador	
Garret Ohogins	
Antonio Gil	
Emigdio Ávalos	
Edmundo Ribera	
Lily De Rivero	
Ricardo Alfonso	Carlos Toledo (child)
José Luis Capobianco	
Katty Gutiérrez	
Monica Landivar	
Claudia Landivar	
Any Barroso	
Rodolfo Suárez	
Joaquín De La Fuente	
Carlos Ortiz	
Percy Román	
Carlos Callaú	
Mireya De Díaz	
Rómulo Dresco	
Fernando Natusch	
Paúl Chávez	
Widen Sorich	
Aida Terrazas	
Jazmine Soruco	Spanish dancer

== See also ==
- La Virgen de las Siete Calles (book)
