= Canal 2 Cochabamba Corazón de América =

- Cochabamba; Bolivia
- Channels: Analog: 2; Digital: 33; Virtual: 2.1
- Branding: Canal 2 CCA

Programming
- Affiliations: Independent

Ownership
- Owner: Canal 2 Cochabamba Corazón de América TV S.R.L.

History
- First air date: 1986
- Former affiliations: Red Uno (1986–1999)

Technical information
- Licensing authority: ATT

Canal 2 Cochabamba Corazón de América, also simply known as Canal 2 CCA is an independent television station in Cochabamba. The station operates on VHF channel 2 (digital channel 33, PSIP 2.1).

== History ==
The channel was founded in 1986 by Laureano Rojas, businessman and politician. Within a few years the station became an affiliate of Red Uno, owned by industrial magnate Ivo Kuljis. The station became independent in the late 90s when Red Uno began being carried on channel 9.

In the late 1990s, Javier Encinas worked at the station as the presenter of the call-in music request show CCA a tus órdenes. One of its prominent local programs is Surcos Folklóricos, which in 2010 made its first college folklore contest. Digital broadcasts started in 2018.

== Programming ==
As of September 2024, Canal 2 CCA broadcasts from 5:30am to 12:30am on weekdays, 6:30am to 12am on Saturdays and 6am to 12pm on Sundays. The channel produces local interest programs (El Matinal, CCA Noticias with two editions, Sazón K'ochala, Hash Tag etc.) and also airs movies (Butaca 2).

When the station was a Red Uno affiliate, the local news service was a local version of Notivisión.
