= Woman (Japanese TV series) =

- Genre: Drama
- Written by: Yuji Sakamoto
- Directed by: Nobuo Mizuta (NTV); Jun Aizawa
- Starring: Hikari Mitsushima
- Country of origin: Japan
- Original language: Japanese
- No. of seasons: 1
- No. of episodes: 11

Production
- Executive producer: Yoshiki Tanaka (NTV)
- Producers: Hisashi Tsugiya (NTV); Yukitoshi Chiba
- Running time: 54 minutes
- Production company: Nippon Television

Original release
- Network: NNS (NTV)
- Release: July 3 – September 11, 2013

Related
- Kadın (Turkey)

Woman , also known as Woman - My Life for My Children, is a Japanese television drama that aired on Nippon Television between 3 July and 11 September 2013, starring Hikari Mitsushima. The series included the staff of the network's popular 2010 drama Mother. The drama was also the first to have a preview available online before its airing on over-the-air television, limited to an audience of 10,000 viewers.

== Plot ==
Koharu (Hikari Mitsushima) lost her husband Makoto (Oguri Shun) in an accident and now lives with her two children, Nozomi (Suzuki Rio) and Riku (Takahashi Rai).

Koharu works hard, working multiple jobs, but the family's finances are tight and they struggle to make ends meet. Pushed to the limit, Koharu goes to the social services office to apply for social assistance, but her application is refused as it does not meet the requirements. When asked if she receives any support from relatives, Koharu says no. Koharu's father has died, and she is separated from her mother, Sachi (Tanaka Yuko), who abandoned Koharu and her father 20 years ago to be with the man she loved (Kentaro: Kobayashi Kaoru).

However, when the social services managed to contact Sachi, she was told that she wanted to help Koharu. Koharu couldn't believe that her mother, who had abandoned her, would say something like that.

Koharu is then forced to meet Sachi for the first time in 20 years.

== Cast ==
- Hikari Mitsushima as Koharu Aoyagi, 27
  - Moeno Sumida as Koharu Aoyagi as a child
- Rio Suzuki as Nozomu Aoyagi (age 5-7)
  - Rio Suzuda as Nozomu Aoyagi (age 4)
- Shun Oguri as Shin Aoyagi (died at 31)
- Yūko Tanaka as Sachi Uesugi (56), Koharu's biological mother
- Kaoru Kobayashi as Kentaro Uesugi (58)
- Fumi Nikaido as Shiori Uesugi (19)
- Rumi Hiiragi as Maki Uesugi
- Asami Usuda as Yuki Kamata (26)
- Tatsuya Kose as Naoto Kamata (9)
- Aito Takada as Masato Kamata (7)
- Mitsuki Tanimura as Aiko Sunagawa (25)
- Takahiro Miura as Ryosuke Sunagawa (26)
- Takugo Ihara as Shunsuke Sunagawa
- Issey Takahashi as Dr. Yugo Sawamura (35)
- Okayama Hajime as Nakano
- Koichi Yajima as Nurse Fujita
- Takashi Inoue as Takao Matsutani (51)

== Episodes ==
	Episode title	Romanized title	Translation of title	Broadcast date	Ratings
1	命をかけて我が子を育てるシングルマザーの感動ドラマ	Inochi o kakete waga-ko o sodateru shingurumazā no kandō dorama	A moving drama about a single mother who risks her life to raise her child	3 July 2013	13.9%
2	母が母であるための間違った選択？	Haha ga hahadearu tame no machigatta sentaku?	A wrong choice for a mother to be a mother?	10 April 2013	11.3%
3	母であること。そして娘でいること	Hahadearu koto. Soshite musume de iru koto	Being a mother and being a mother	17 July 2010	11.4%
4	ぼく、おとうさんに会いたいよ	Boku, otōsan ni aitaiyo	I want to meet my father	24 July 2013	13.9%
5	誰にも言えない、母の覚悟	誰にも言えない、母の覚悟	A mother's determination that she can't tell anyone	31 July 2013	12.6%
6	生きるための嘘、我が子のために	Ikiru tame no uso, waga-ko no tame ni	A lie to survive, for my child	7 August 2013	14.7%
7	生きる為に死んだ大切な人、その真実	Ikiru tame ni shinda taisetsunahito, sono shinjitsu	The truth about loves ones who died in order to live	14 August 2013	13.0%
8	あの子を殺して私も死ねばいいの？	Ano ko o koroshite watashi mo shineba ī no?	Should I kill that child and die too?	21 August 2013	13.0%
9	生きたい！ せめてあと10年	Ikitai! Semete ato 10-nen	I want to live! At least for 10 more years	28 August 2013	14.9%
10	お母さん、ほんとうのこと言って！	Okāsan, hontō no koto itte!	Mom, tell me the truth!	4 September 2013	14.0%
11	こどもたちのこどもたちへ	Kodomo-tachi no kodomo-tachi e	Children to children	11 September 2013	16.4%
Ratings for Kanto region (average rating: 13.6%)

== International broadcasts and adaptations ==
Like Mother, the series spawned an adaptation in Turkey, Kadın, which aired on the Turkish Fox channel in 2017. The Turkish version was subsequently distributed around the world. The success of the Turkish adaptation, as well as of Turkish products in Latin America, prompted Nippon TV to begin exporting a dubbed version of the Japanese series to selected markets in 2020, the first networks being Red Uno in Bolivia and Teleamazonas in Ecuador. Nippon TV also signed remake agreements for France and South Korea.

Preceded by Kumo no Kaidan (17/4/2013 - 19/6/2013)	NTV Wednesday Dramas 水曜ドラマ; Wednesdays 22:00 - 22:54 (JST)	Succeeded by Dandarin 101 (2/10/2013 - 11/12/2013)
