= Bolivia TV 7.2 =

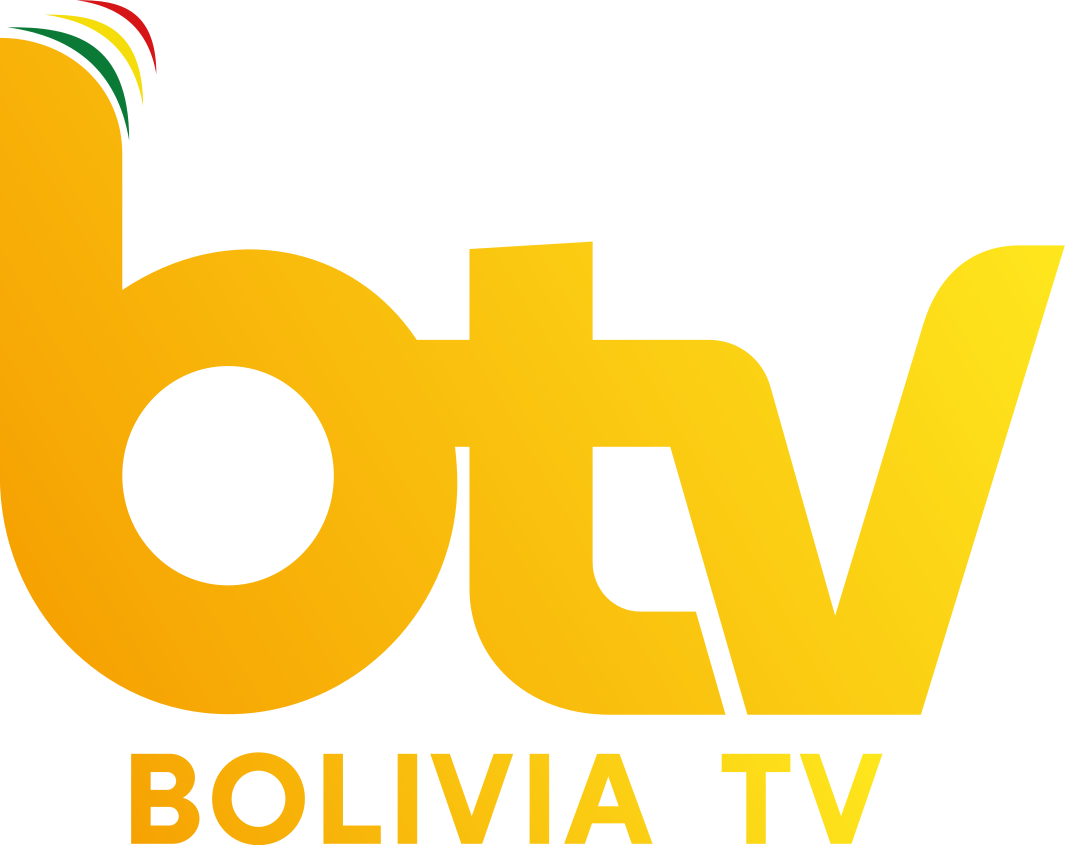
- Country: Bolivia
- Broadcast area: Bolivia
- Headquarters: La Paz, Bolivia

Ownership
- Owner: Empresa Nacional de Televisión de Bolivia, public company of the Bolivian government

History
- Launched: December 21, 2015 (10 years ago)
- Former names: Bolivia TV Deportes (2015-2019)

Links
- Website: https://www.boliviatv.bo/

Bolivia TV 7.2 is a Bolivian over-the-air television network available nationally on the digital terrestrial television network as a subchannel of Bolivia TV. The channel is also available over the Túpac Katari satellite.

== History ==
Test broadcasts started in April 2015 ahead of Copa América 2015. Bolivia TV presented its subchannel on November 20, 2015, as Bolivia TV Deportes, by granting a five-year license to the Bolivian regulator ATT. The channel was also set to air soccer matches where Evo Morales was present, in Bolivia and abroad. Its broadcasts started on December 21, 2015, with President Morales appearing in its inaugural program.

The channel was renamed Bolivia TV 7.2 in December 2019. On May 2, 2020, it started airing a slot dedicated to Bolivian short films (Hasta 30: Cortometrajes 100% Bolivianos).
