= Remedios Loza =

Bolivian Aymara artisan, television presenter and politician

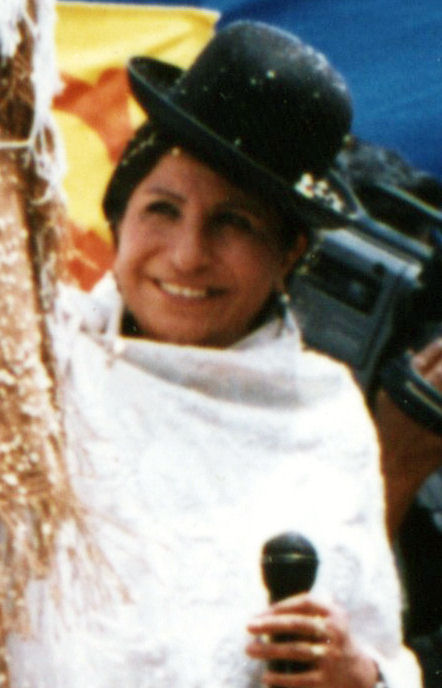

Member of the Chamber of Deputies from La Paz
- In office 6 August 1989 – 6 August 2002

Personal details
- Born: Francisca Remedios Loza Alvarado; 21 August 1949 La Paz, Bolivia
- Died: 14 December 2018 (aged 69) La Paz, Bolivia
- Party: CONDEPA
- Children: Sayuri Loza
- Parents: Marciano Loza (father); María Cleofé Alvarado (mother)

Francisca Remedios Loza Alvarado (21 August 1949 – 14 December 2018) was a Bolivian artisan, television presenter and politician.

== Biography ==
Remedios Loza was born in La Paz on 21 August 1949, the eldest of eleven siblings. She wove art pieces for Alasitas. After hearing her native Aymara language on the radio for the first time in September 1965, Loza turned to the medium herself, and later became a television presenter. While working in media, Loza met Carlos Palenque. She became the first person of indigenous descent to be seated in the Bolivian National Congress. Loza was a member of the Conscience of Fatherland (CONDEPA) and represented La Paz between 1989 and 2002. She ran on CONDEPA presidential ticket twice, as vice presidential candidate to Palenque in 1993, and as the party's presidential candidate in 1997, following Palenque's death.

Loza died of stomach cancer on 14 December 2018, and was honored with a state funeral at the Plurinational Legislative Assembly on 17 December 2018.
