= Canal Mágico =

- Country: Bolivia

Programming
- Language: Spanish
- Picture format: 4:3 SDTV

Ownership
- Owner: Red Mágica (Cruceña de Televisión)

History
- Launched: 1996
- Closed: September 2002

Availability

Terrestrial
- Analog UHF: Channel 24 (Santa Cruz, Cochabamba, Oruro, Sucre and Tarija); Channel 42 (La Paz)

Canal Mágico (Magic Channel), also known by its legal name Red Mágica (Magic Network), in turn operated by Cruceña de Televisión, the owner of Red Uno's license in Santa Cruz de la Sierra (as well as sharing its facilities), was a Bolivian over-the-air television network, owned by Grupo Kuljis. It started broadcasting in 1996, on channel 42 in La Paz and channel 24 in Santa Cruz de la Sierra, Cochabamba, Oruro, Sucre and Tarija. In addition to these three cities, the network broadcast to three more at closing time. It was founded by Ivo Kuljis, owner of Red Uno.

Not much of the channel is documented; the channel was aimed at children and aired cartoons and live-action series. In June 2001, the network started airing The 700 Club in the evening. The slot was formerly occupied by Robotech.

In its first year on air, the channel aired Facetas Deportivas, when its production company had a contract with Red Uno. Red Uno aired Gol at noon and Canal Mágico, Facetas in the evening. This lasted about a year and in 1997 it moved to the nascent Unitel.

In January 2002, Ivo Kuljis put the channel for sale to use the money for his presidential campaign; at the time, the network had six stations and the winner would get the frequencies. Two proposals were made, one costing US$1.5 million for Red ADvenir, an Adventist channel, and another for US$1 million. The contract was signed on January 31, 2002, and was broadcast on Red Uno's Notivisión. Around September 2002, the channel shut down and was replaced by the Adventist network. ADvenir faced financial problems, had it lapsed its payments after December 30, 2002, the frequencies were given back to Ivo Kuljis; the day before the dateline, the network was able to continue operating, meaning that a return to the former owner became impossible.
