= RTP (Bolivia) =

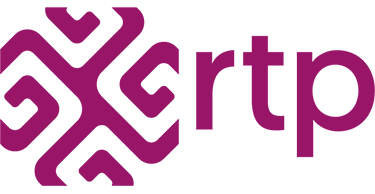
- Country: Bolivia
- Broadcast area: Bolivia

Programming
- Picture format: 1080i HDTV (downscaled to 480i for the SD feed)

Ownership
- Owner: Sistema RTP (1985–1995, 2009–present); Grupo Garafulic (1995–2002); PRISA (2002–2009)

History
- Launched: May 10, 1985; 41 years ago

Links
- Website: www.rtpbolivia.com.bo

Availability

Terrestrial
- Digital VHF: Channel 4.1 (La Paz)
- Analog VHF: See the table below

RTP (abbreviation of Radio Televisión Popular), is a Bolivian free-to-air television channel, based in La Paz. It was launched in 1985 by Carlos Palenque and is owned by Sistema Nacional de Radiodifusión Boliviana (better known as the RTP System).

== History ==
=== Early years ===
In 1985, Carlos Palenque, who already had a radio station (Radio Metropolitana, founded in 1979), founded the channel. The channel was created following the principles of his radio outlet: "Alternative and participative communication, presenting the fact as they happen, community services and programming according to the expectations of the people". Numerous participants spontaneously appeared in front of its cameras to express their needs and daily problems. At the time, the channel broadcast a five-hour schedule still in experimental format, from Mondays to Saturdays.

Carlos Palenque's son Jorge Luis Palenque was already working on the station in its early years, starting with programs aimed at children and youth, but within years had joined the news department.

=== Closure, foundation of Condepa ===
In June 1988, the government of the Revolutionary Nationalist Movement under the command of Víctor Paz Estenssoro, ordered the closure of the Metropolitana radio station and the RTP channel due to an interview with drug trafficker and self-proclaimed "king of cocaine" Roberto Suárez Gómez (who had a stance against the Bolivian government), which involved Paz Estenssoro. Roberto said that "the King is the United States and the Vice-King is Víctor Paz Estenssoro". The State considered that the interview was an apology for crime and a lack of respect for the president. Both the TV channel and its sister radio outlet Radio Metropolitana were banned for one year. In opposition, Carlos Palenque initiated a hunger strike against the decision.

The closure was rejected by press organizations. The crowd that caused the event not only forced the reopening of both stations, but also led to the founding of Condepa.

=== Relaunch, sale, under Garafulic ===
Everything continued with the purchase of RTP by ATB and La Razón. During this period, on March 8, 1997, Carlos Palenque died, victim of a heart attack. The announcement of his death was delivered by Adolfo Paco, who weeped over a static slide:

"This is Adolfo Paco talking, coordinator-general of the system. Please inform the public opinion, that approximately two hours ago, Compadre Carlos Palenque ceased to exist, victim of a fatal cardiac arrest. We are all very hurt... We are devastated... In the past few days last few days, Compadre died... Very bad news... That ruined his health. And today, he left us, compadres. Compadre Carlos Palenque has died. I want... I want, please, people, today, more than ever, we are united, and we are going to inform you where his remains will be located. That was the information, compadres, thank you so much."

Following the profits received from Televisa productions, the Garafulic Group bought 30% (later increased to 50%) of the shares and transferred all the remaining programming to RTP and Bolivision . Thus having Garafulic as the total owner, until the bankruptcy of Lloyd Aéreo Boliviano, which led to the PRISA Group taking all the properties of the Garafulic Group.

=== Under the Palenques ===
In 2008, the channel started over-the-air broadcasts in Santa Cruz de la Sierra, being also available on cable company ITS; in January 2014, the channel was added to COTAS.

Originally, the son of Carlos Palenque and Mónica Medina knew the channel since he was 14 years old, it was not until 2014, where after assuming the direction of La Doble 8 (a radio station of La Paz origin, also owned by the channel), he took over the RTP directive. Rumors emerged of a possible sale, which were denied by its administration.

Its first changes were to stop broadcasting telenovelas that were previously broadcast on other networks such as Pantanal, distance itself from talk shows (common on most channels) and broadcast several films (mostly from Paramount Pictures, Nickelodeon from Paramount Global's (now Paramount Skydance's). with its long-standing partner, ATB). The channel also managed to produce its own series, mostly identified as Documentales RTP (the most notable being, Busch, Two Shots at Dawn), or also several national series. It maintained several programs such as La Tribuna Libre del Pueblo or La Wislla Popular, but it also brought other programs, which were mostly broadcast on Bolivia TV. On March 21, 2014, on occasion of Bolivian Movie Day, the channel aired Vidas lejanas by Okie Cárdenas.

While the reality talent show Bailando por un Sueño was broadcast on Red Uno, Jorge Luis Palenque criticized the channel, the program and stated that it was garbage television (telebasura), compared to RTP programming. He said that the program also objectified women, due to the controversial nature of the program.

After several attempts to launch its signal in HD, the ATT (the Bolivian Telecommunications and Transportation Authority) authorized Radiodifusoras Populares SA (the channel's corporate name) to operate in high definition, according to Supreme Decree Nº. 3152. Although the license applies to the runk axis (La Paz, Cochabamba and Santa Cruz), the signal only operates in La Paz, as it only has one VHF signal.

Between 2017 and 2019, RTP received 42.5 million bolivianos in government propaganda.

RTP presented its new logo in 2021, and with this, it gradually renewed its programming.

In 2023, RTP made radical changes, withdrawing Cinemundo (a magazine program of cinematographic origin, similar to Cinescape and which moved from Red Uno) and Axesso (a musical program dedicated to rock, previously broadcast on Bolivia TV) and replacing them with more movies from Paramount as well as a new reality show, Lucha de Caseritas (hosted by former Sipiripi host, Rayssa Arias).

In 2024, it completely loses the rights to Paramount Pictures films, with Red Uno being the only channel with an agreement with Paramount Global (now Paramount Skydance) (broadcasting Nickelodeon series).

== Network ==
Stations given to Radiodifusoras Populares S.A.
Location	Channel	Status
Trinidad	39	Relayer
Sucre	11	Transmitting station
Cochabamba	18	Relayer
Bolinda	4	Transmitting station
Bolinda	6	Relayer
Caranaví	4	Transmitting station
Caranaví	6	Relayer
Cerro Muruata	4	Transmitting station
Cerro Muruata	6	Relayer
Chulumaní-Huancane	4	Transmitting station
Chulumaní-Huancane	6	Relayer
Coripata	4	Transmitting station
Coripata	6	Relayer
Coroico	4	Transmitting station
Coroico	6	Relayer
La Paz	4	Transmitting station
Luribay	4	Relayer
Luribay	63	Transmitting station
Pilón	4	Relayer
Pilón	6	Transmitting station
Tipuani	4	Relayer
Tipuani	6	Transmitting station
Tres Arroyos	3	Transmitting station
Tres Arroyos	6	Relayer
Cerro Negro Pabellón	4	Transmitting station
Cerro Negro Pabellón	63	Relayer
Oruro	4	Transmitting station
Cobija	39	Relayer
Cerro Malmisa	4	Relayer
Cerro Malmisa	63	Transmitting station
Potosí	4	Relayer
Potosí	63	Transmitting station
Santa Cruz de la Sierra	47	Transmitting station
Tarija	5	Relayer
Tarija	15	Transmitting station

Digital broadcasts from La Paz began in 2018, after the main RTP station was awarded a license.

== Programming ==
- La Tribuna Libre del Pueblo
- Taypi
- RTP Informa
- Noticiero Popular
- La Wislla Popular
- El Deportivo
- Los Principales
- Gustito Boliviano
- Lucha de Caseras
- QD Show
- Telepolicial
- Fuego Cruzado
- Haciendo Historia
- Domingueando
- Choleadita
- Cinemundo
- Ni Divinas, Ni Ángeles
- Claroscuro
- El café
- Ritmo Popular
- ABC de la medicina
- No Mentiras
- RTP Mundo
- Los hijos de Cecilia
- El XQ de las noticias
- Tu Top Night

== Staff ==
=== Current ===
- Jorge Luis Palenque
- Ángel Careaga
- Valeria Gonzáles
- Pepe Murillo
- Inés Quispe
- Eduardo Godoy
- Soraya Delfin
- Irguen Pastén
- Sofía Aracena
- Álvaro Funes
- Marco Tarifa

=== Former ===
- Carlos Palenque
- Adolfo Paco
- Edgar Pato Patiño
- Mónica Medina
- Remedios Loza
- Perico Perez

=== Channel announcer ===
- Dieter Rocha (since 2016)
- Soraya Delfin (since 2024)

== Controversies ==
=== Usage of government propaganda in the final years of the Evo Morales administration ===
The then Minister of Communication (ministry currently dissolved), Isabel Fernández Suárez revealed that the television media in Bolivia enjoyed benefits of millions of dollars of government propaganda in the government administration under Evo Morales, of which RTP received an amount of 42.5 million bolivianos between 2017 and 2019.
