= Radio y Televisión Universitaria UTO =

Radio and TV station in Bolivia

Radio y Televisión Universitaria
- Country: Bolivia
- Broadcast area: Oruro
- Affiliates: Red Universitaria Boliviana de Información
- Headquarters: Oruro, Bolivia

Ownership
- Owner: Technical University of Oruro

History
- Launched: July 28, 1978 (48 years ago)

Availability

Terrestrial
- Analog VHF: Channel 13 (Oruro)
- Digital (PSIP): Channel 13.1

Radio y Televisión Universitaria (RTVU) is the radio and television service of the Technical University of Oruro. It operates a radio station and a television station, both of which use the RTVU branding. The television channel operates on channel 13 and is one of the nine active university channels.

== History ==
The Technical University of Oruro started radio broadcasts on February 9, 1953 and television broadcasts on July 27, 1978. The radio station started at a time when the radio sector began to liberalize, while the television station was established in association with the date of its autonomy. Its equipment was destroyed in October 2003 during the Gas War in an attempt to silence its operations.

In October 2018, RTVU announced that it would start broadcasting its services in high definition.

In August 2021, Marcelo Lafuente became its director. In 2023, a special mixed volleyball match was played for its 45th anniversary, hosted by the RTVU team. In 2024, it teamed up with local newspaper La Patria to broadcast the Oruro Carnival. On May 9, it officially started its digital broadcasts.
