= Televisión Universitaria UAJMS =

Televisión Universitaria
- Country: Bolivia
- Broadcast area: Tarija
- Affiliates: Red Universitaria Boliviana de Información
- Headquarters: Tarija, Bolivia

Ownership
- Owner: Juan Misael Saracho Autonomous University

History
- Launched: April 15, 1976 (50 years ago)

Links
- Website: Official website

Availability

Terrestrial
- Analog VHF: Channel 9 (Tarija)

Televisión Universitaria UAJMS is a Bolivian terrestrial television station owned by the Juan Misael Saracho Autonomous University, itself headquartered in Tarija. The station is part of Red RUBI and was the first television station to broadcast in color in Bolivia.

== History ==
In 1975, university authorities negotiated with Acción Cultural Loyola (ACLO) to install a radio station. From these talks, a plan to install a television station as an alternative started. On March 5, 1976, by means of Resolution nº 744, the Juan Misael Saracho Autonomous University led to the creation of the station. Its first regular broadcasts were held on the evening of April 15, 1976 on VHF channel 8, seven hours a day. From the beginning, it broadcast in color. At an unknown date, the station moved to channel 9.

In the 1980s, TVU started broadcasting eighteen hours a day, from 6am to midnight. For its educational content, it received recognition from German international television syndicator Transtel. The station carried the 1992 visit of Pope John Paul II to Tarija in 1992; later in the 90s, it took part in pre- and post-production of the Bolivian feature film Milagro en Tarairi with the Bolivian army.
