= Chaqueña de Televisión =

- Yacuiba, Tarija; Bolivia
- City: Yacuiba
- Channels: Analog: 2 (VHF)
- Branding: Chaqueña de Televisión

Programming
- Affiliations: Red Uno

Ownership
- Owner: Canal 2 Chaqueña de Televisión SRL

History
- First air date: December 27, 1985
- Former channel number: 3 (1985-?)

Technical information
- Licensing authority: ATT

Chaqueña de Televisión (channel 2) is a Red Uno-affiliated station licensed to Yacuiba, a city in Tarija Department.

== History ==
The station launched on December 27, 1985; initially the station broadcast on channel 3. In 1995, still on channel 3, the station was being reorganized, as it was being operated in a precarious manner, with underperforming revenue figures. At an unknown date in the mid-late 1990s, the station move to channel 2, its owner at the time being Celia María Creencia Mariscal de Cativa. In 2023, the station carried the live broadcast of the Circuito Callejero, alongside other stations in the department. The outlet was one of several being criticized in November 2024 for benefits in advertising contracts.

As of 2024, the station has three local programs on air: YD Streaming (9am to 10:30pm), a morning opinion program; El Meridiano (1pm) and Edición Central (9pm). The rest of the programming is relayed from Red Uno.
