= E-commerce in Bolivia =

The e-commerce in Bolivia started in 2010s. The country suffered from several problems, ranging from lack of infrastructure to lack of internet access, and most part of the population was skeptical of online markets. As the internet access grew, e-commerce popularized through informal markets specially in social media. The COVID-19 pandemic in the 2020s was an important factor for the growth of the number of consumers and the transaction of established companies to the internet.

== Market size and growth ==
Bolivia's e-commerce is deeply tied on informality. Most of the countries transactions happens inside of social media platforms, such as Facebook's Marketplace, Instagram, WhatsApp, Google and YouTube. As a general rule, the prices in the informal market are way cheaper, but there is the prevalence of falsified goods. There are many factors that contribute to this phenomenon, such as the lack of infrastructure, high bureaucracy and lack of trading deals with other countries (Bolivia is a landlocked country). In 2018, the Agencia Boliviana de Correos could take from 6 months to a year to make a delivery. The country also have problems with internet access and connectivity. There is also the prevalence of web stores that only show their products online but finalizes the deals in WhatsApp. According to the research realized by the Ariadna Communication Group, in 2020, 32% of consumers pays in cash for not having a bank account or for being afraid of online frauds. According to El Deber, Bolivia has a culture of checking the product integrity in person, and in 2021 60% of the population never made a transaction online, but there was a staggering growth within the younger generations, used to services such as Uber and Airbnb. According to the Bolivian Chamber of Electronic Businesses and Services, in 2023 93% of businesses sold products non-regularly. According to the Agency for Electronic Government and Information Technology, in 2017 only 10% of internet users bought a product online and 6% offered something to sell.

The COVID-19 pandemic forced many businesses to go online, accelerating the use of e-commerce in Bolivia. According to La Razón, before the pandemic only 1% of supermarket sales happened online, but the number jumped to 10% in 2020. In 2021, the Ministry of Economy and Public Finance announced that the growth rate in online orders was between 21% and 34% in the main cities, with WhatsApp alone being responsible for at least 17% of sales. According to the Bolivian Association of E-commerce, the number of clients in 2021 was 300 million.

Other important factor for the e-commerce was the popularization of the QR code, implemented in Bolivia in 2019 by 11 banks through the Simple service. Bolivia is the first Latin-American country to implement QR codes as an interbank payment system. After the COVID-19 Pandemic, many businesses, such as BISA Seguros and Cháves, adopted the QR code as a sanitary way of making payments. According to the Central Bank of Bolivia, the use of QR codes jumped from 6 million in 2021 to 290 million in October 2024, a growth of 4,733%. Before the implementation of the QR code, there wasn't many ways to make a payment online. In 2016, Banco Unión was the first Bolivian bank to habilitate their debit card for online shopping. It is also possible to make payments through mobile data, but in 2020 the service was only offered by one company, Effectivo S.A. In 2024, 2% of internet buyers made payments through PayPal and other e-wallets.

== Funding ==
Companies from different segments invested in e-commerce, specially after the COVID-19 pandemic. Some of them are PedidosYa, Patio Service, Pedidos Online, Multicenter, and Hipermaxi.

On 9 July 2020, 12 companies, including Icom, Grupo Hemisferios, Linkser, TuMercadazo, Totto, and TuGerente.com, created the Bolivian Association of E-commerce (ABCe) and celebrated the first e-commerce day.

== Regulation ==
According to the International Trade Administration, the sector suffers from lack of regulation. The main regulatory law for e-commerce in Bolivia is the Law nº 164/8 August 2011.

The Norm nº 10-0044-13 from the National Tax Services is Bolivia's main regulatory device focused in the safety of the consumer. It forces online products to have their value-added tax (IVA) included in the final price and companies from the sector to be registered in the Tributary Identification Number (NIT).
