= Hipermaxi =

Bolivian supermarket chain

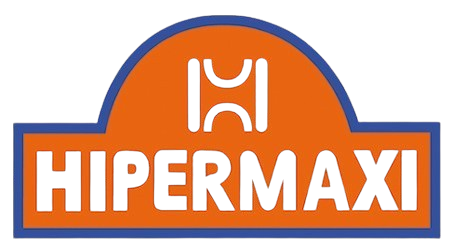

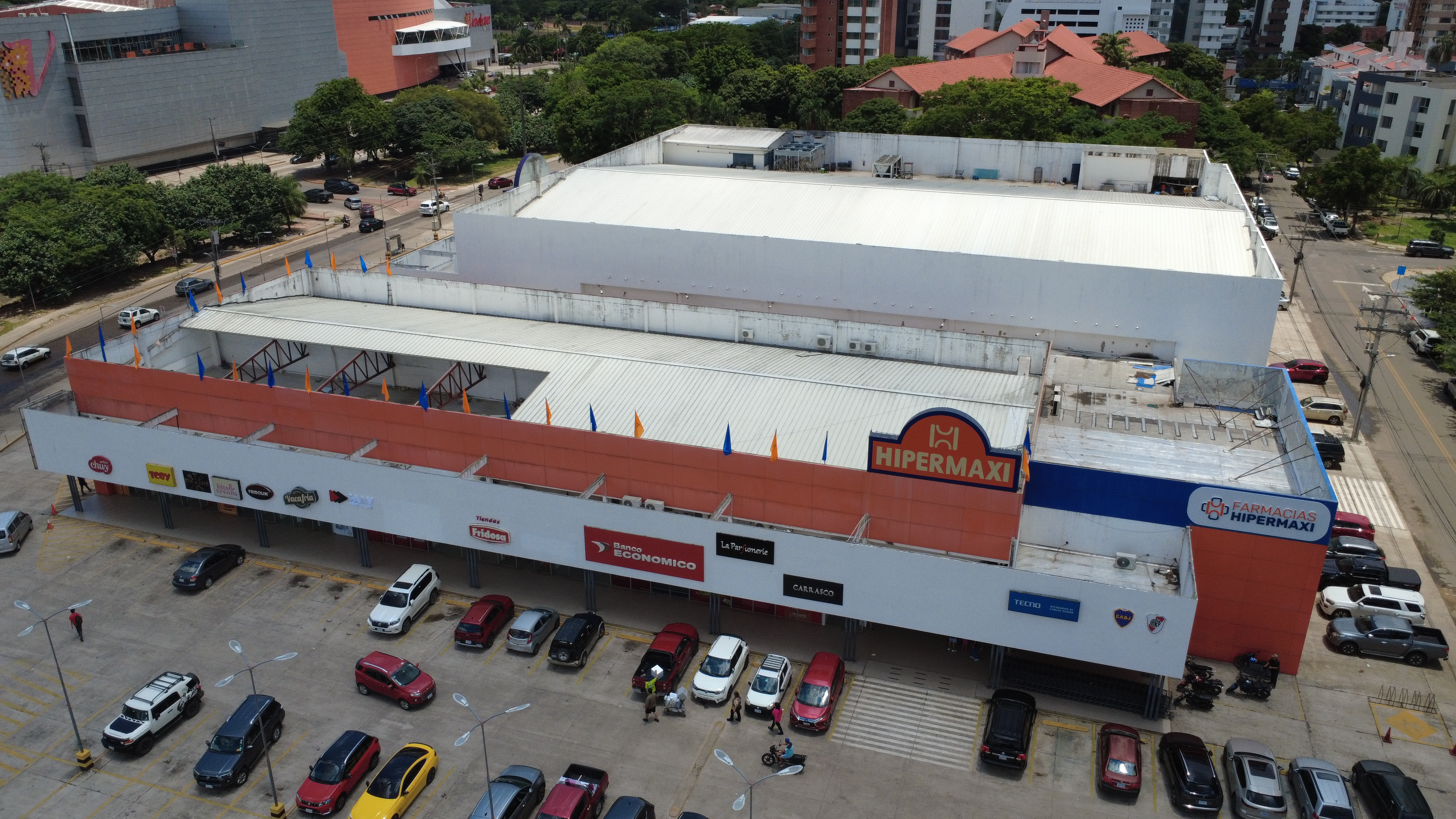
- Hipermaxi in Equipetrol Norte, Santa Cruz de la Sierra
- Trade name: Hipermaxi
- Company type: Private
- Industry: Retail
- Founded: 4 March 1994; 32 years ago
- Founder: Tomislav Kuljis Füchtner
- Headquarters: Santa Cruz de la Sierra, Bolivia
- Number of locations: 37 (2025)
- Services: Supermarket, pharmacy
- Number of employees: +4.000 (2024)
- Website: https://www.hipermaxi.com/

Hipermaxi is a Bolivian supermarket chain created in Santa Cruz de la Sierra on 4 march 1994 by Tomislav Kuljis Füchtner. In 2025, there was 37 supermarkets and 37 pharmacies through Bolivia.

== History ==
The first Hipermaxi was inaugurated in Santa Cruz de la Sierra by Tomislav Kuljis Füchtner on 4 March 1994. In 2014, the company opened their sixth subsidiary and announced the opening of three subsidiaries per year.

According to Kuljis, Hipermaxi sales fell in 50% in 2020 due the COVID-19 pandemic. Their first official COVID-19 case was announced on 4 April 2020.

In 2021, the online app and QR codes were implemented. In 2023, Hipermaxi started selling food from the Croatian company Podravka. In 2024, Hipermaxi launched their e-commerce platform.

In 2025, Hipermaxi had 37 supermarkets and 37 pharmacies. They also produce food products, including sausages and panettone. Their subsidiaries are located in several Bolivian cities, including in El Alto, La Paz, Montero, Sacaba, and Cochabamba, including one unit inside of the luxury condominium Las Terranzas.

== See also ==
- List of supermarket chains in South America
