= F10 (TV channel) =

Bolivian television channel

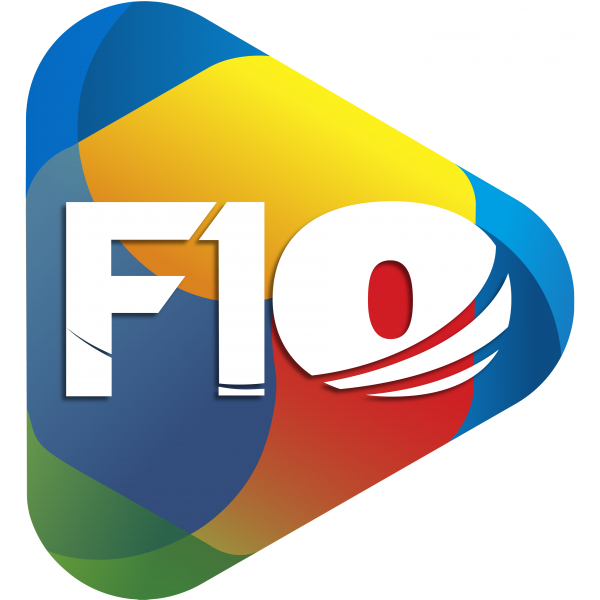
- Country: Bolivia

Programming
- Picture format: 1080i HDTV

Ownership
- Owner: FTTV Comunicaciones (Freddy Ticona Gonzales)

History
- Launched: November 23, 2020

Links
- Website: www.f10.tv.bo

Availability

Terrestrial
- Digital UHF: Channel 10.1 (virtual, El Alto-La Paz)

F10 is a Bolivian television channel broadcasting from Ciudad Satélite in the outskirts of El Alto, in the department of La Paz, owned by FTTV Comunicaciones and founded by Freddy Ticona Gonzales. The channel broadcasts over-the-air in La Paz and on cable television operators nationwide.

== History ==
Freddy Ticona and John Arandia set up the channel on November 23, 2020, in experimental mode, in May 2021, it was announced that the station would start regular broadcasts in June. The channel was the first generalist television station in Bolivia to gain a fully-digital television license. There were plans to begin broadcasting to Cochabamba and Santa Cruz de la Sierra, but these depended on ATT's decisions.

Regular broadcasts started on July 1, 2021. 70% of its programming was produced locally.

On July 18, 2022, it was recognized by the Senate of Bolivia for its continuous communicational work.

On July 22, 2022, it won the Maya Award for "Revelation Media Outlet"; its news operation F10 Noticias won another category in on August 25, 2023, "Best Local TV Newscast".

== Programming ==
F10 produces a wide array of original programming: F10 Noticias (news operation of the channel), La Revista F10 (morning program), Recreo F10 (kids), El Expreso F10 (news updates), F10 Al Rescate, Sport 10 (sports news), Así es aquí con La Aplanadora, Contra Reloj and La Hora Calasich. The channel also airs international movies and TV series, such as Charmed, Full House, Grey's Anatomy and Dexter's Laboratory, as of June 2025. On weekdays, the channel is on air from 6am to 1am (signing off after the repeat of the main edition of Noticias F10), while on weekends, it is on air from 6am to 12am.

== Coverage ==
The channel has over-the-air coverage in La Paz, El Alto, Viacha, smaller provinces in La Paz Department, and Cochabamba. It also has nationwide coverage on the TKSAT-1 satellite and is available on Tigo, AXS, COTEL (La Paz), COMTECO (Cochabamba), COTEOR (Oruro) and COOPELECT (Tupiza). ATV Argentina, a low-power channel in Buenos Aires targeting the Bolivian diaspora, also carries its programming.
