= Immigration to Bolivia =

Migration origin destination MapBolivia

Bolivia comparatively has experienced far less immigration than its South American neighbors. Nevertheless, small groups of Germans, Spaniards, Italians, a small Croatian community, and others live in the country. The Basques were a large source of Spanish and European immigration from the late 16th to early 20th centuries, most came as shepherds and ranchers to Bolivia's vast livestock industry.

Similar to other Latin American nations, Bolivia has experienced a small Japanese migration. Beginning in 1899 a small migration of Japanese began that continued until the 1970s. Small Japanese communities were formed in the Bolivian department of Santa Cruz. Other East Asians (Taiwanese, Koreans, and Chinese) and West Asians such as the (Lebanese and Syrians) developed their own communities in Bolivia in the late 20th century. During the 20th century Bolivia received a small number of Jews, mainly Ashkenazi.

== Country of birth of Bolivian residents ==
According to the 2001 Census, 87,338 of the Bolivian resident population were born outside Bolivia, representing 1.06% of the total Bolivian resident population.

Place	Country	2001	1992
1	Argentina	27,094	17,829
2	Brazil	14,428	8,586
3	Mexico	9,377	6,607
4	Peru	8,824	5,805
5	Spain	5,650	1,337
6	Chile	4,163	3,909
7	United States	3,216	2,503
8	Paraguay	3,201	955
9	Canada	1,635	1,435
10	Japan	1,387	1,159
11	Germany	1,281	1,099
12	Colombia	1,244	529
13	Belize	939	806
14	Italy	734	718
15	Ecuador	652	N/D
16	China	533	N/D
	Other countries	7,180	6,530
TOTAL		91,538	59,807
Source: CEPAL
