= UPEA Televisión =

UPEA Televisión Canal Universitario
- Country: Bolivia
- Broadcast area: El Alto
- Headquarters: El Alto, Bolivia

Ownership
- Owner: Public University of El Alto

History
- Launched: November 17, 2017 (8 years ago)

Links
- Website: Official website

Availability

Terrestrial
- Analog VHF: Channel 25 (El Alto/La Paz)
- Digital UHF: Channel 25.1 (El Alto/La Paz)

UPEA Televisión is a Bolivian university channel owned by the Public University of El Alto, in the city of El Alto, adjacent to La Paz, the national capital.

== History ==
The station started broadcasting in analog format on November 17, 2017; its founder being Freddy Medrano. In 2019, the channel increased its coverage area to the entirety of El Alto and La Paz.

The station gained national notoriety on May 12, 2020 for being the first television channel in Bolivia to air the weather in a native language (Aymara).

On November 20, 2023, UPEA Televisión started digital terrestrial broadcasts on virtual channel 25.1 in high definition.
