= Banco Económico =

Bank of Bolivia

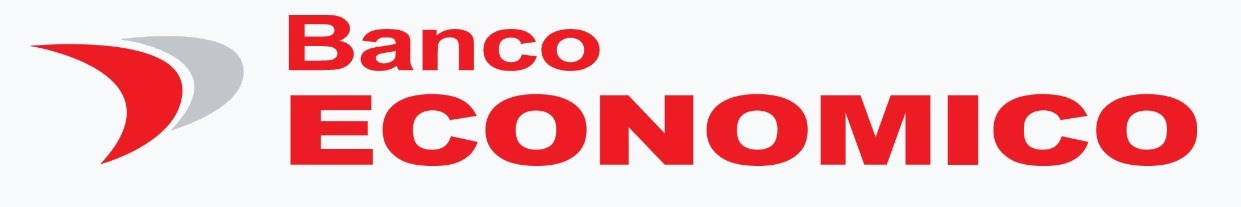
- Type: Sociedad Anónima (S.A.)
- Industry: Financial
- Founded: Santa Cruz de la Sierra, Bolivia (February 7, 1991)
- Headquarters: Santa Cruz de la Sierra, Bolivia
- Key people: CEO Sergio Mauricio Asbun
- Products: Financial services
- Website: www.baneco.com.bo

Banco Económico, is a Bolivian bank and financial services company with headquarters in Santa Cruz de la Sierra. It is a full-service corporation that provides a wide range of financial products and services to an individual and corporate client base through a national network.

== History ==
The "Banco Económico" emerged as a business purpose in December 1989 when a group of businessmen from the Santa Cruz region, Bolivia, linked mainly to productive and service activities, met with the concern of forming a long-term financial project, which, at from that region, expand to the rest of the country and later, abroad. In this way, Banco Económico S.A. was established. on May 16, 1990 in the city of Santa Cruz de la Sierra, beginning its financial operations on February 7, 1991.
