= Carlos Palenque =

Bolivian musician, singer and politician

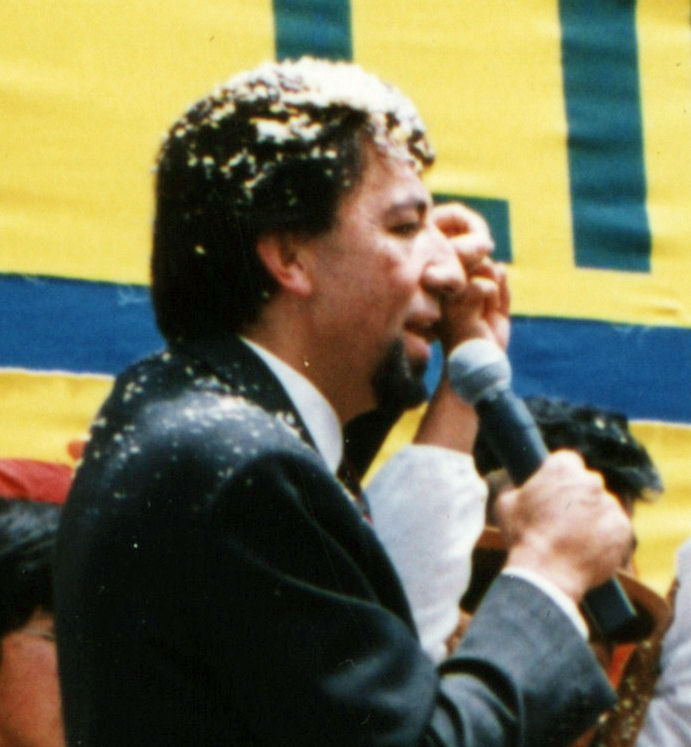
Carlos Palenque

Carlos Palenque (28 June 1944, La Paz – 8 March 1997) was a Bolivian musician, singer and politician known to his fans as the Compadre. He died of a heart attack. He was the founder of RTP and CONDEPA, and a presidential candidate in 1989 and 1993.
