= Televisión Universitaria UAGRM =

Televisión Universitaria
- Country: Bolivia
- Broadcast area: Santa Cruz de la Sierra
- Affiliates: Red Universitaria Boliviana de Información
- Headquarters: Santa Cruz de la Sierra, Bolivia

Ownership
- Owner: Gabriel René Moreno Autonomous University

History
- Launched: March 1, 1973 (53 years ago)

Links
- Website: Official website

Availability

Terrestrial
- Analog VHF: Channel 11 (Santa Cruz de la Sierra)
- Digital VHF: Channel 11.1 (Santa Cruz de la Sierra)

Televisión Universitaria, also known as TVU, is a Bolivian over-the-air television station, launched on March 1, 1973, by the Gabriel René Moreno Autonomous University. It broadcasts on VHF channel 11, as part of the Red Universitaria Boliviana de Información (Red Rubi) in the city of Santa Cruz de la Sierra.

== History ==
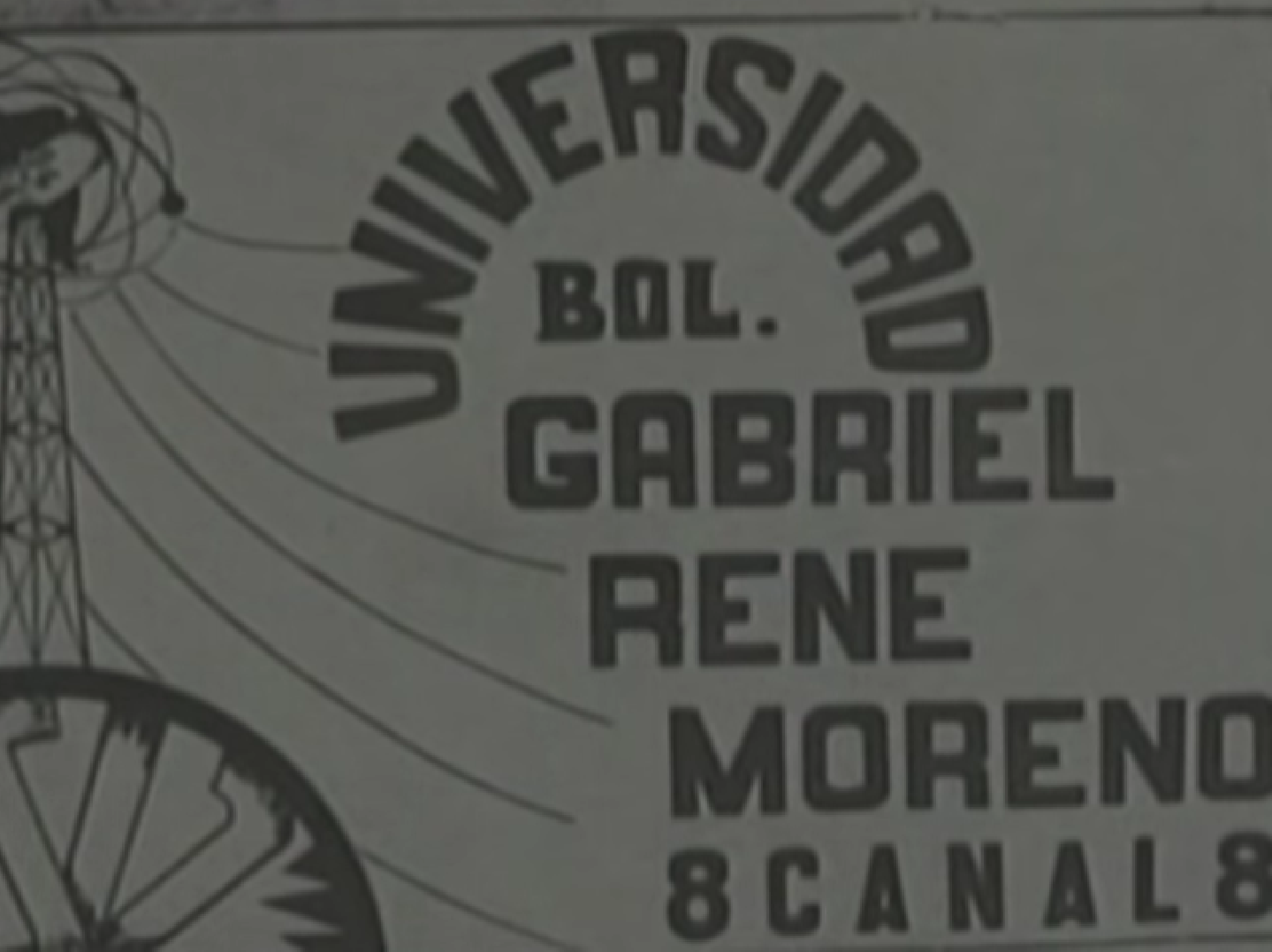
Slide used in the experimental phase between 1973 and 1978.

TVU was the first channel to go on air in Santa Cruz de la Sierra, as up until then, television was limited to La Paz and surrounding areas, by means of Televisión Boliviana, the state channel.

The channel started experimental broadcasts on March 1, 1973, using a homemade transmitter with a 5-watt radius broadcasting on channel 8. The channel broadcast three days a week, its first director was Noel Alderete Arteaga and Alfredo Quiroz the first technician. In 1978, it started color broadcasting and moved to channel 11, its current frequency. It had also started color broadcasts before TVB finished its conversion. In 1986 it acquired a powerful 10 kW transmitter by means of a Japanese donation.

The emergence of private television networks caused the university networks to dwindle their viewer base, even though they did not have commercial funds to sustain them.

Sittel, the regulator, warned TVU UAGRM on July 22, 1996 due to, earlier in the year, the broadcast of movies (Philadelphia, Distant Justice, Last Knight and Jurassic Park) without the consent of the distributors. Columbia TriStar Television International had not released the rights to Philadelphia on Bolivian over-the-air and cable and MCA TV International had not released those of Jurassic Park at the time.

In 2013, the station was introducing a new transmitter enabling viewers to receive the signal with better quality.

On November 11, 2019, TVU was one of the media outlets that announced a voluntary shutdown due to threats facing the resignation of Evo Morales.

An agreement was signed with Cooperativa Rural de Electrificación in August 2023, with the aim of digitizing the signal. The new administration since 2022 has tried improving the channel's public image, as its programming didn't need community needs.

== Technical information ==
TVU UAGRM received its digital transmitter from Germany in December 2023, aiming to start full HD service on January 1, 2024.
