= Red Uno de Bolivia =

Red Uno de Bolivia Red Uno
- Country: Bolivia

Programming
- Language: Spanish
- Picture format: 1080i HDTV (downscaled to 480i for the SD feed)

Ownership
- Owner: Red Uno de Bolivia S.A. Comunicación Integral S.R.L. (Potosí, Sucre and Tarija)

History
- Launched: April 1984
- Former names: Teleandina (La Paz); Cruceña de Televisión (Santa Cruz de la Sierra); Unovisión

Links
- Website: www.reduno.com.bo

Availability

Terrestrial
- Digital VHF: Channel 11.1 (La Paz); Channel 9.1 (Cochabamba); Channel 13.1 (Santa Cruz de la Sierra)
- Analog VHF: Listings may vary

Streaming media
- Live Stream (Bolivia only)

Red UNO de Bolivia (literally "Network One", commonly referred to as Red UNO and occasionally also called simply UNO, UNO being the initials of Unión Nacional de Organizaciones Televisivas, "National Union of Television Organizations") is a national Bolivian television network owned by conservative businessman Ivo Kuljis, a businessman of Croatian origin, who also owns other interests outside of media. It started operations in April 1984 in Santa Cruz and in 1985 in La Paz. Its most notable programming is Notivisión (news) and "El Mañanero (morning magazine)". It also maintains affiliation deals with three channels in Potosí, Sucre and Tarija.

== History ==
=== PROTEL ===
In 1979, Ivo Kuljis founded production company PROTEL (Producciones Gráficas y Televisivas), the first private television production company in Bolivia, using the most advanced video and television equipment at the time, producing commercials, documentaries and Telesemana for the state channel. PROTEL in the early 80s (1982 to 1983 approx.) started making test broadcasts, without the permission of the Bolivian authorities, despite problems the country was facing, such as hyperinflation and lack of social control. The government shut down PROTEL's broadcasts and later Kuljis spoke with mayor Velarde to grant him a private television station.

=== Cruceña de Television and Teleandina ===
Cruceña de Televisión (Channel 13) was established on February 2, 1984 and launched on the air on April 1, 1984, owned by Ivo Kuljis. Until then, Santa Cruz only had two television stations, channel 7 from the government's Televisión Boliviana (still in black and white) and channel 11 from UAGRM (in full color). Broadcasting hours and signal reach were limited, yet it became the first private television station in the city.

In the city of La Paz it began its broadcasts on July 1, 1985, under the name of Teleandina on VHF channel 11, with broadcasts from Monday to Friday at 6:00 p.m. and on weekends at 5:00 pm., being owned by brothers Mario and Hugo Roncal. At the time the channel broadcast pirated content from other countries, a recurrent practice in early private television stations. Back then, filmmaker Hugo Roncal was the channel's general manager. In 1987 the transmitting antenna changed and Teveandina expanded its broadcast schedules starting at 11:00 a.m. from Monday to Friday and at 6:00 a.m. on Sundays. Teleandina's studio was located in the center of the city and they moved to Miraflores first and to Sopocachi at the end of the 1980s, thus broadcasting regularly since November 24, 1988. Teleandina's first programs were Virgul, an animated cartoon; the America's Top 10; Julio Sabala specials and Italian Football on Sunday mornings.

=== Formation of Red Uno de Bolivia (1991) ===
In 1991, it entered a stage of definitive consolidation. Its relationship with associated production companies allowed the station to produce national programs.

Likewise, Teleandina broadcast on channels 11 in Oruro, 13 in Santa Cruz, 6 (affiliation later moved to 9) in Cochabamba (channel 2 CCA Corazón de América is an independent channel that broadcast some programs), 11 in La Paz and had repeater stations throughout the country.

Ivo Kuljis used the station to intensively promote his political campaigns in 1993 and 1997.

In November 1994, a new stage of technological growth begins with a new transmission equipment adapted to work at an altitude of 4000 meters above sea level and with a power of 5 kW.

Work was done on the ideal conditioning for the operation of this new equipment, which consisted of new irradiation antennas, a new tower and adequate electrical installations.

The work carried out made it possible to improve the quality of the signal, thus perfecting the sharpness of the image; and a greater reach allowing a wide national coverage.

Ivo launched a sister channel to Red Uno in 1996, Canal Mágico (Magic Channel), aimed at children. The channel closed around September 2002 when it was sold to Adventist interests; Kuljis invested the money in the network for his failed 2002 electoral campaign. In July 1997, Red Uno relaunched itself under the name "Red Uno Satelital", by starting a satellite feed. Ronald Murillo, managing general of the La Paz station, emphasized its national coverage.

=== 2000s ===
Rumors began circulating in 2001 that Eric Jürgensen was set to return to Bolivia as the director of programs of Red Uno. He was named director of the network in the middle of the month, reaching the post from January 2002.

The digitization process started in 2004, when Red Uno bought a 10 kilowatt Harris Platinum transmitter for the station in Santa Cruz de la Sierra. For the second half of 2006, the network promised an investment worth US$500,000 in digital non-linear editing equipment.

In 2005, Red Uno aired Floricienta, leading in its 7pm timeslot with an audience share of 24.9%.

=== 2010s ===
The network in 2011 had, according to a survey conducted by Revista IN, an audience share of 21%, being the second most watched television network in Bolivia, behind Unitel. Three years earlier (2008), the network was in third place (18%)

In 2011, the network aimed to find equipment to digitize its signals, beginning with the main station in Santa Cruz, as well as the station in La Paz. For the second semester, digitization of the stations in Oruro, Potosí and Sucre was announced. In 2012, Red Uno inaugurated new studios located in Santa Cruz and the modernization of its equipment to be able to broadcast and record in HD. However, it was not until 2018 when the channel began broadcasting on digital terrestrial television (DTT) in high definition.

The network in 2013 was planning the conversion of its facilities to HD by 2014, which was the initial date set by Evo Morales.

Red Uno began to have a crisis in 2015 and caused by a labor award, which in 2016 escalated to threats that its license would be withdrawn if it did not follow the court orders; in August 2020, the ordinary justice freezes the accounts of Red Uno (valued at a value of more than Bs 2,000,000); the channel suffers several layoffs and the crisis of its programming. The problem is (even today) that there is sufficient evidence of labor abuse that still happens in that company. This fact was covered up by the previous government and only the Ordinary Justice of Santa Cruz has responded by freezing accounts.

=== Digital phase and current situation (since 2018) ===
In August 2020, it acquired Streann as its OTT management provider.

The network unveiled a new brand identity on December 5, 2022, with the unveiling of a new slogan (Red Uno Para Todos) and a song. The new slogan reflects both inclusion and cultural diversity of Bolivia. The blue blob was also relocated being placed inside the O of the wordmark. The following month, it announced the acquisition of Fremantle's Family Feud format for Bolivia, as 100 bolivianos dicen.

== Network ==
City	Channel	Licensee	Notes
La Paz	11	Red Uno de Bolivia, SA	Red Uno O&O
Santa Cruz de la Sierra	13	Red Uno de Bolivia, SA	Red Uno O&O
Cochabamba	9	Red Uno de Bolivia, SA	Red Uno O&O
Trinidad	13	Red Uno de Bolivia, SA	Red Uno O&O
Sucre	2	Red Uno de Bolivia, SA	Red Uno O&O
Oruro	11	Red Uno de Bolivia, SA	Red Uno O&O
Potosí	2	Red Uno de Bolivia, SA	Red Uno O&O
Tarija	11	Red Uno de Bolivia, SA	Red Uno O&O
Cobija	5	Comunicaciones Patuju Pando	Affiliate
Montero	10	Red Uno de Bolivia, SA	Red Uno O&O
Yacuiba	9	Canal 2 Chaqueña de Televisión SRL	Affiliate

In the late 90s, Red Uno also had affiliation agreements with Canal 2 Cochabamba Corazón de América and Canal 4 Quijarro.

== Studios ==
Red Uno has its studios 1 and 2 in the second northern ring road of Santa Cruz. They are accessed by Cristóbal de Mendoza esq. Honduras, very close to there at Fortín Toledo Esquina Canada, has its studios 3 and 4. In August 2019, it opened its "El Bajio" unit in the sixth ring road of Pirai Avenue with the largest television studio in Bolivia, its studio 5, approximately one thousand square meters. It also has central control, in addition to studies in La Paz and Cochabamba.

- Cristóbal de Mendoza Fortín Toledo and Av. Pirai, Santa Cruz (5 studios, 8 sets): Notivisión Santa Cruz, Bigote, Que no me pierda Santa Cruz, El mañanero Santa Cruz, Cocineros bolivianos Santa Cruz, Factor X and Los Marquina. Regional administrative offices.
- Romecín Campos 592, La Paz (4 sets): Notivisión La Paz, Que no me pierda La Paz, El mañanero La Paz and Cocineros bolivianos La Paz. Center check. Satellite Teleport.
- Uyuni 1029, Cochabamba (2 studios): Notivisión Cochabamba and El mañanero Cochabamba.
- There is also a broadcast facility in Sucre and Tarija given by the "Grupo de Comunicaciones del Sur" for the channel and for Radio Panamericana.

== Programming ==
Its programming until its crisis was still notable for the airing of telenovelas from the catalogs of TV Globo (Brazil), Caracol (Colombia) and Latin Media Corporation (India). Even between 2011 and 2017, productions of Televisa and South Korean soap operas stood out. The network was the first option for Televisa in 2013 to export its products to Bolivia. Televisa went to Bolivisión after the meager results and the South Korean telenovelas (which attracted high ratings among women in the mornings) would be displaced by the Turkish ones. In this genre, it aired telenovelas from Show TV and Kanal D, also with regular results. What characterized the channel as an alternative to Unitel and ATB, were more realities and the mixture of its own programs, classic CBS series and even fiction, and national TV shows (such as the former ¡Qué familiaǃ Los Serrano for example, the first sitcom made in Bolivia). It produced its first telenovela, Enamorado de ti, in 2014, but as a segment in Bigote.

The network premiered a local adaptation of Televisa's format Bailando por un Sueño in 2015, with a second season announced in July of that year. In 2018, it started producing an adaptation of The X Factor, with auditions starting in January that year.

The network started broadcasting various beauty pageants which have been partnered by Promociones Gloria organization in 2017 including: Miss Santa Cruz, Miss Bolivia, Miss Universe, & Reina Hispanoamericana. Until 2016, these had been broadcast on Unitel.

The network started airing telenovelas from TV Globo in 2018, which up until then were mainly associated with Unitel. The first of which was A Força do Querer. In 2019, the channel gained the Bolivian rights to air the Viña del Mar Festival.

In 2020, Red Uno received a package of dramas produced by Nippon Television which was also bound for Teleamazonas in Ecuador. Both dramas (Mother and Woman) were both series whose Turkish adaptations were already shown in the Latin American market. It also aired the Indian series Beyhadh from Latin Media's catalog.

In June 2020, Red Uno started carrying Nickelodeon series on Sunday mornings. An anime slot was added in July 2021, airing on Saturday mornings.

In 2022, it broadcast the 2022 FIFA World Cup held in Qatar alongside Bolivia TV and Unitel. That same year, news and opinion programming made up 75% of the output, with acquired content making up for 25%. The network attended LA Screenings to find formats for the youth demographic.

As of January 2025, 95% of its weekday schedule is of its own production.

El Chavo and El Chapulín Colorado returned to Bolivian screens on Red Uno on April 1, 2025. The arrival caused the removal of Dragon Ball Z from the channel's schedule.

It was the first channel in the world to air the Mexican telenovela Valentina, mi amor especial, on April 3, 2025. In August 2025, it started airing a weekly match from La Liga, the Spanish soccer league. The deal was inked with SportsTV Rights, who had recently did the same with the 2025 FIFA Club World Cup, of which fourteen matches were broadcast over-the-air.

=== Original programming ===
- Notivisión: Newscast of the channel.
- El mañanero: Morning magazine, informative format.
- Sabores Bolivianos: Original version of Cocineros argentinos, a program dedicated to cooking, on air since 2018.
- Qué No Me Pierda: Nightly political talk show. In 2013, it was positioned as "a high-impact political talk show, competing with Hollywood productions".
- La Gran Batalla: Singing and Talent competition show.
- Dueños De La Tarde: Afternoon magazine, informative format.
- Bolivia Siglo XXI: Independent production from Carlos Mesa, sequel to Bolivia Siglo XX, first aired on November 8, 2026. Twelve-part documentary series on the history of Bolivia in the first quarter of the 21st century.

=== Former programming ===
- La Virgen de las Siete Calles (TV series)
- Bigote
- Punto Joven
- Revista Uno
- Deportivo Uno
- Uno Teens (mid-2000s)
- Mundo Geek (2023–2025)
- La Noche de la Gri (2023-2024): Weekend talk show, hosted by Grisel Quiroga.
- 100 Bolivianos Dicen (2023-2025): adaptation of the Family Feud format that premiered in 2023.

== Announcers ==
- Jesus Rodriguez (2008–2020)
- Veronica Sejas Zamorano (2019–present)

== Slogans ==
- 2013–2014: Somos alegría, somos uno (We are joy, we are one)
- 2014–2015: El canal de la alegría (The Channel of Joy)
- 2016–2019: La alegría es naranja (Joy is orange)
- 2018–2022: Cada vez mejor (Getting better and better)
- 2022–present: Para todos (For everyone)

== Accolades ==
- Cruz Potenzada of Santa Cruz (2023)

== Controversies ==
=== 2008 Cochabamba bombing incident ===
The transmitter of the Cochabamba station was damaged by a dynamite attack on September 16, 2008, a few months after the Unitel affiliate in Yacuiba suffered the same to its facilities.

=== Government propaganda ===
The then Minister of Communication (ministry currently dissolved), Isabel Fernández Suárez revealed that the television media in Bolivia enjoyed benefits of millions of dollars of government propaganda in the previous administration of government under Evo Morales, of which Red Uno received an amount of 82.3 million bolivianos between 2017 and 2019.

=== Rescheduling of Luis Arce interview ===
Red Uno owner Ivo Kuljis received a letter on October 2, 2020 to reschedule the debate with presidential candidate Luis Arce, scheduled for October 4, in order to participate in a larger debate held by the network.
