= Bolivia TV =

Bolivia Televisión
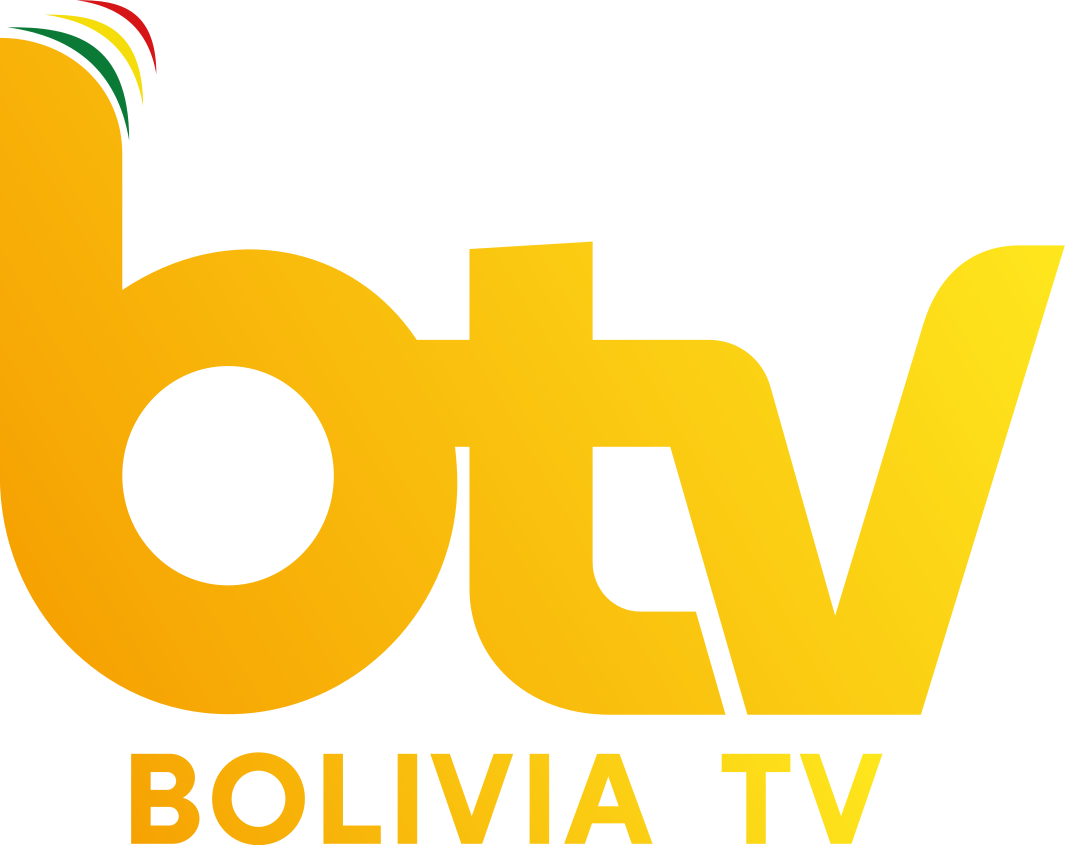
- Country: Bolivia
- Broadcast area: Bolivia; Worldwide
- Headquarters: La Paz, Bolivia

Programming
- Picture format: 1080i HDTV

Ownership
- Owner: Empresa Estatal Bolivia Televisión

History
- Launched: August 30, 1969 (57 years ago)
- Former names: Televisión Boliviana (1969–1984; 1993–2009); Televisión Nacional de Bolivia (1984–1986; 1989–1990; 1991–1993); TVN Bolivia (1990–1991); Canal 7 (2009); Bolivia TV (2009–2025)

Links
- Website: TV Boliviana

Availability

Terrestrial
- Analog VHF/UHF: Channel 7 (La Paz, for the rest see the table below)
- Digital VHF: Channel 7.1 (La Paz)

Bolivia Televisión (abbreviated BTV) is the first television station of Bolivia and serves the only means of television communication from the government. The channel was established in August 1969 under the government of Luis Adolfo Siles after years of planning by the government of then-recently deceased René Barrientos. It is a state-owned broadcasting network.

Created to replace the previous public station Televisión Boliviana or TVB, it was the audience leader as it was the only legal television station in the country until 1984, when private television stations were legalized in Bolivian territory. The station claims to be plural and the only media outlet reaches out to the whole population.

Bolivia TV has been accused by society and opposition politicians of being a means of propaganda for the government in power. Most of the channel's content belonged to social organizations and figures affiliated with the ruling party.

== History ==
=== Military governments (1969–1979) ===
State television in Bolivia emerged a long time after the same started in other Latin American countries. On October 5, 1965, the government signed Supreme Decree 7345 to create the Radio and Television Direction, which was followed by Decree-Law 7454 on December 22 the same year for the government to control the service without specifying technical characteristics. The latter decree suggested that "the degree of cultural and educational development in the country makes it necessary, timely and advisable to incorporate the Television Service into the active life of the nation", with "predominantly cultural and educational purposes". This decree formalized the creation of the national television company. On December 23, at a Cabinet Council, the supreme decree for regulation and supervision of television was signed which, for one year after the signing of the decree, gave control of the television service to the Bolivian State for the future development of the country.

Following the 1966 Bolivian general election, plans were already underway for a national television service owned by the government. Up until then, Bolivia was served by a small number of closed-circuit experimental systems. The new service was set to be called "Red Nacional de Televisión" (National Television Network). Proposals from Spanish, Japanese, American and French companies were presented. The bid was won by Spanish company Industrias Electrónicas y Electromecánicas (INELEC), by means of Supreme Decree 8262 of February 20, 1968, for the television network in the cities of La Paz, Cochabamba, Oruro, Santa Cruz, Potosí and Sucre, at the total cost of US$2,487,900. Provisions were made for the government to provide a one-year monopoly to the first TV station in Bolivia, scheduled to start before the end of 1966. The state had already reserved three frequencies, channel 5 in La Paz, channel 4 in Cochabamba and channel 3 in Santa Cruz de la Sierra. After the prospective first year period ended, the state would allow the creation of private television stations.

Given the rumors of the closure of Congress and the desire of the government of that time to have power over the country to become a dictator, President René Barrientos Ortuño signs the Supreme Decree 08395, on June 19, 1968, with which he founded the Bolivian Radio and Television Company (RTB), and later, with Supreme Decree 8571 (November 20, 1968) decides to change the name to Empresa Nacional de Televisión Boliviana (or by its acronym, ENTBOL).

The first experimental broadcasts were held in July 1968, with no structured continuation and limited to a few areas of La Paz.

Due to the death of Barrientos (caused by a helicopter accident in Arque), his vice president, Luis Adolfo Siles Salinas, assumes the presidency, and therefore, continues Barrientos' project before dying. At that time, a contract was signed with the Spanish company, INELEC, in order to advise and contribute to the installation of the State Television Channel. Many of the members of the technical team were members of the Spanish company, as well as the Bolivian Air Force, in addition to several equipment parts being brought from Spain.

==== Test phase ====
Programmed test transmissiones were made throughout July, including the July 16, 1969 celebrations.

With high expectations, ENTBOL aired the audiovisual archive of the Apollo 11 moon landing, running 49 minutes, and shown at 8pm on July 24. From the Supreme Government, it solicited the importing companies of television sets to install such sets at Plaza Murillo, Paseo del Prado and other areas of La Paz to see mankind's achievement on television.

The president initially authorized the launch of Televisión Boliviana for August 4. However, the launch was delayed until the end of the month.

==== On air ====
Televisión Boliviana was launched on August 30, 1969, at 7:46pm, during the constitutional government of President Luis Adolfo Siles Salinas, being an unfinished project of the last stage of the deceased president René Barrientos Ortuño The first face seen on the station was that of Tito Landa. International news came from DPA newswires, where the news arrived on a three-day delay.

Initially, the coverage area was limited to La Paz, from a studio located in El Alto, with the signal reaching the capital and the mining centers. In 1971–1972, the coverage expanded to cover other departments, by means of relay stations. The signal was satisfactorily received in a few areas of La Paz, in other cities less so, in a precarious manner.

Juan Fernando Landa, better known as Tito Landa, was its first presenter, being on the network from opening night.

Ovando Candia's government signed Supreme Decree 9352 on August 20, 1970, giving the company to the Ministry of Information and a three-member board. Later that year, Supreme Decree 9914 granted French company LGT the supply of relay equipment to mining districts, from Luribay in La Paz to Colquiri, as well as equipment and technical material for a Motorola communication system. The choice of a French company followed on from the bankruptcy of INELEC in 1970. Until then, only the central station in La Paz was finished at the cost of US$1,415,138.70.

Of a state nature, two years later it became the tool with which the dictatorship of Hugo Bánzer tried to neutralize the influence of the mining stations, and to prevent them from operating successfully. In 1974, the government and COMIBOL distributed five thousand television sets in the mines with extensive payment facilities. According to testimonies from the families of the miners, the introduction of this new medium changed the views and expectations of the population, although later in 1978 the miners demanded the return and reopening of their radios through a stoppage of activities. TV Boliviana was financed largely by advertising.

In addition to assuring security to Bolivia thanks to the telecommunications services, it was also suggested that ENTEL, the telecommunications company, should join Intelsat or another satellite consortium. On October 15, 1974, the signing of Supreme Decree Nº. 11862 gave the company the complete right to exploit its signals in closed circuit technology.

Between 1976 and 1977, TVB started experimenting live broadcasts between two cities.

In 1977, the structure of the television market in the country was made up of nine television stations: eight managed by state universities with regional coverage (La Paz, Santa Cruz, Tarija, Cochabamba, Oruro, Sucre, Potosí and Trinidad), and one state network with national coverage. That same year General David Padilla authorized the granting of licenses for private television stations. However, before they were assigned, his regime suffered a coup by General García Meza, who promptly re-established the state monopoly on television, and appointed military rectors in the universities, so that its channels came under the close control of the Ministry of the Interior. The relative independence that these stations had until then was considerably reduced.

That same year, it received its first camera (made by Ampex) manufactured especially for the network, for its coverage of the 1977 Bolivarian Games.

=== Arrival of color television (1979) ===
The government adopted PAL-M as the color television deployment in April 1976, following its introduction coming from Supreme Decree 13381 on February 20 that year. However, the television station owned by the Juan Misael Saracho University of Tarija opted for the NTSC format from April 13 that year, contradicting the decree. This situation was corrected in 1979, enabling all television station in Bolivia to broadcast only on the NTSC standard.

On August 1, 1979, Televisión Boliviana began broadcasting on the NTSC system. in color compatible with the M transmission system in black and white. This, despite the fact that from 1976 some foreign productions could be seen in color in the country.

In early November 1979, its broadcasts were frequently interrupted in order to control public opposition.

=== Temporary Union takeover (November 1979) ===
On November 17, 1979, during the government transition between Walter Guevara Arce (who was a clandestine ruler), Alberto Natusch Busch's de facto regime and the recent administration of Lidia Gueiler, The Televisión Boliviana Workers' Union (ENTB) accepted the chance of taking charge of the network, as well as a transitional schedule, until it was positioned to the new authorities. Using an announcement spread to several media outlets, the union raised the awareness of the abandoning of the company's authorities after the fall of Natusch Busch's regime. As consequence, the Presidency of the Republic, by means of senator Benjamín Miguel Harb, approved the union takeover, with the aim of maintaining Channel 7's television transmissions, such act was approved by press, radio and television labor unions. The announcement was signed by several of its members, among them Felix Espinoza, Freddy Meneses, Pastor Gemio, José Orozco, José Luis Fernández and Rosario C. de Flores.

=== Democratic governments and the entrance of private media (1982–2003) ===
During the governments of presidents Hernán Siles Zuazo (1982–1985) and Víctor Paz Estenssoro (1985–1989), Televisión Boliviana showed greater political plurality, including spaces for the opposition and more objective journalism . The administration of President Jaime Paz Zamora (1989–1993) continued with this opening. But by then, private television stations began broadcasting clandestinely, and even managed to obtain broadcasting licenses, events that caused a drop in audience for the state network. Around this time, the station was also plagued by abuse, manipulation and censorship incidents. During the first government of President Gonzalo Sánchez de Lozada (1993–1997), the channel's newscasts were directed by the journalist Carlos Mesa. The station's programming broadcast a wide variety of journalistic, historical and documentary programs. Some slots were broadcast in indigenous languages.

Until the arrival of the first private television stations, Televisión Boliviana was still a partisan television station. The environment changed in 1984, as Siles Zuazo favored freedom of the press, contrary to what the Ministry of Information's stance of television as a medium under state control.

The Bolivian economy in 1984 was facing a period of stagflation, to which the Unidad Democratica Popular government adopted new measures from April 12, 1984, causing the state TV company to cover the new measures. However the station criticized the measures, under the grounds that "such broadcast is an abuse of power of the Government". On April 25, the UDP government fired Eduardo Ascarruz, the manager of Empresa Nacional de Televisión ENTB Canal 7, being replaced by Luis Quintanilla. The dismissal of the official ended up causing indignation in the television station's union towards the Supreme Government. On April 26, 1984, the ENTB workers' union, through an emergency assembly, rejected the dismissal of journalist Eduardo Ascarrúnz and assigned a "politician", proceeding with an indefinite general strike. The unionists accused the Minister of Information, Mario Rueda Peña, of the "arbitrary determination", the general secretary, Felix Espinosa questioned the political militancy of manager Quintanilla with the MIR, an ally of the UDP government.

The arrival of democracy also led to the arrival of political pluralism to the network, where at the end of the 1980s proeminent journalists such as Carlos Mesa (who also had a career in private stations) started shaping up the public opinion sector, which in the 90s was already known as the "todólogos" ("know-it-alls").

With the arrival of the second government of president Hugo Bánzer (1997–2001), the editorial line of Televisión Boliviana took a clear turn to the right. Military parades and national commemorations were often broadcast. News programs avoided mentioning the bloody human rights violations that occurred in the 1970s, during the first Bánzer government. After his death in 2002, his successor, Jorge Quiroga (2001–2002), the network did not make significant changes.

During the second government of President Gonzalo Sánchez de Lozada (which began in August 2002) an attempt was made to return to a program similar to that of his first term from 1993 to 1997, but the resounding fall of his government with the Gas War in October 2003 left many projects shelved. In the political turmoil that shook the country in the two years and two months that followed, the station was unable to adopt a defined information line and its programming showed a gradual deterioration that did not improve until the decline of its corporate identity.

=== Decline and closure of Televisión Boliviana (2005–2009) ===
Since the assumption of the presidency by the first government of Evo Morales Ayma, in January 2006, the channel has undergone profound changes. One of TVB's projects was the beginning of broadcasts in high definition for the first time in the country.

Since 2007, the network has entered into an alliance with the Japanese television station NHK for the broadcast of documentaries. Due to the costs of maintaining the alliance due to the low budget suffered by the channel, they were removed from the air, as were done Telesur productions that were broadcast on TVB. The eliminated programming was replaced by the transmission of Bolivian films and events related to works by the Evo Morales government. The network tried to increase the audience and the commercial collection with the incorporation of programs such as La Justa or continue with the broadcast of programs such as Bolivia Agropecuaria and Viajero. Even so, the station caused a huge debt to the Bolivian State, which chose to declare it bankrupt. This fact caused the cessation of operations of the Bolivian National Television Company.

On April 15, 2009, through Supreme Decree No. 0074, the "Liquidation of the Empresa Nacional de Televisión Boliviana – ENTB" was declared, and in turn the closure of operations and transfer of equipment and assets of ENTB to the State Company to be created, ending the first television network in the history of Bolivia, 4 months after the 40th anniversary of the start of operations of the state channel. The former network was accumulating losses of US$6 to 8 million. The government created Bolivia TV as a replacement for the former company. In the interim, the channel operated using the name Canal 7. All of its staff was laid off.

=== Beginning of Bolivia TV (2009) ===
Supreme Decree No. 0078 determines the creation of the State Television Company called "Bolivia TV"; determine its legal nature, object, heritage; and establish the composition and attributions of its board of directors and its general manager, with legal domicile in the city of La Paz. The general manager will be appointed by the minister of the presidency through a ministerial resolution.

The board of "Bolivia TV" is made up of the ministers of:

- Presidency
- Development Planning
- Economy and Public Finance
- Public Works, Services and Housing
- Education
- Cultures

The new station started, as scheduled, on June 1, 2009. The formal service launched on November 11, 2009, coinciding with the launch of 120 new relay stations, increasing the coverage area to 200 settlements.

On February 15, 2011, Supreme Decree No. 0793 was enacted, which establishes the creation of the Ministry of Communication and, in turn, the responsibility of appointing the general manager of Bolivia TV.

Considering... that telecommunications constitute a strategic sector, because they seek national and global integration, eliminating the exclusion of impoverished sectors of the country with the reduction of the digital divide. Likewise, the reduction of inequalities in access to telecommunications will allow the Bolivian population, especially the poor and marginalized social sectors, the opening of greater opportunities for economic and social development. – Fragment of Supreme Decree No. 0078

After the bankruptcy, a new company called Bolivia TV1 was created, which continued broadcasting on the frequencies previously used by TVB, a few programs of the defunct station continued to be broadcast by the recently inaugurated channel. In addition, the channel began broadcasting 24 hours a day.

Viewing figures for Bolivia TV according to the Revista IN survey conducted in 2011 put it at sixth and last place with 5% of the audience share. In 2008, it was in fourth place with 7%, ahead of PAT and Bolivisión.

BTV as of 2024 employs more than 270 staff members. The network is starting to adapt to the rise of social media in the country. The network has more than 532,000 TikTok followers; however on Facebook, it has fewer (55,000). The network gives its social media success to its educational gameshow La Academía del Saber, whose individual TikTok profile surpassed a million followers.

=== Launch on DTT and HD signal (2011) ===
Following a memorandum of understanding signed between the governments of Bolivia and Japan, the ISDB-T standard was selected and the first test users were Bolivia TV and the university stations. Since the end of September 2011, BTV began broadcasting on digital terrestrial television on channel 16 UHF in La Paz, from the La Ceja studios in El Alto. A month later, in October of the same year, from its experimentation in the Folkloric Entrance of the Oruro Carnival, Bolivia TV launched its own signal in HD. The channel became the first station in Bolivia to broadcast in high definition.

By 2021, it had two high-definition signals.

==== Bolivia TV 7.1 ====
It is the main channel of the station. It broadcasts in high definition with the same programming that it broadcasts at the Avenida Camacho Studios, La Paz. It does not broadcast regional programming, which is broadcast exclusively by VHF in analog form in the different departments of the country.

==== Bolivia TV 7.2 ====
It is the second channel of the station. Its programming consists mainly of sporting events, and in the background of national and foreign productions broadcast by the main channel, with the exception of newscasts.

=== As Televisión Boliviana ===
Before becoming Bolivia TV, Televisión Boliviana had the mission of educating, informing and entertaining and each general manager decided how many hours and which programs were aired. As of 1971, 24% of its programming was made up of entertainment (excluding sports).

In the 1970s, TVB produced a miniseries adapted from Till Eulenspiegel that was later exported to Paraguay – Bolivian television's first export. In 1974–75, the station broadcast Enfoques, an entertainment program produced by Mario Cucho Vargas. The program invited international stars such as Julio Iglesias and Luis Aguilé, aiming to attract greater impact in its viewers, similar to entertainment shows in Argentina.

Starting with the color era, in 1980 TVB broadcast from 5:00 p.m. and its early afternoon shows consisted of mostly American cartoons. Afterwards, youth programs of North American pop music, a sports program, the general news program "Telenoticioso Boliviano", a Mexican or Brazilian telenovela and American TV series such as Starsky and Hutch were aired to finish the daily broadcasts.

On Saturdays and Sundays, the television network extended its hours until 3:00 p.m. on Saturdays and 11:00 a.m. on Sundays. Among its outstanding programs were the classic films from the United States dubbed into Spanish, cartoons, American TV series and the program Deporte Total, which completed the programming. On Sunday mornings, TV Boliviana broadcast the Catholic Mass from the Basilica of San Francisco.

With the arrival of private stations, TVB's programming first reached 15 hours a day of broadcast starting at 9:00 am. It started the day with a talk show until 12:00 pm, then a sports program followed, followed by cartoons, films and youth programs in the afternoons. The newscast was also broadcast at night, followed by a telenovela, and to finish, a movie from the large back catalog of dubbed classics that the channel had in its archive was broadcast.

After 1987, the station was known as "the channel of the Holy Spirit" (el canal del Espíritu Santo) because, due to its low power and constant interference from other media outlets, the signal could not be fully received. At that stage, TVB was putting aside commercial programming to focus on cultural, educational and news programs.

In 1991, TVB started satellite broadcasts and bought 120 10-watt transmitters. These advances were possible thanks to money obtained from a Spanish credit. Other networks would later start their satellite broadcasts. In 1993, Canal 7 was the first media outlet in Bolivia to start its satellite broadcasts, but its terrestrial signal at that time left much to be desired. Having released a new 10 kW transmitter and new equipment donated by the Government of Spain, in a short time they began to show defects, needed spare parts and stopped working. The TVB signal was barely visible.

It was in each special event like the 1994 USA World Cup when TVB showed its power and coverage, reaching with its repeaters to places that were not covered by private stations.

The World Cup in France in 1998 was the last one broadcast by TV Boliviana, which was made with joint broadcasts together with ATB. That same year, TVB upgraded its satellite system to digital.

From 2000 to 2007, the station broadcast NHK World programming.

=== As Bolivia TV ===
With the relaunch of the channel as Bolivia TV, the strategy of the current government was continued, although now in "schedules published on the Internet". As of 2012, the network takes up the cultural agenda with transmissions of folk festivals that took place throughout the country apart from the "Carnaval de Oruro", such as the "Integration Entrance" from Buenos Aires, Argentina. Likewise, live broadcasts of concerts by Bolivian groups were developed, whether folklore, theater or a music festival such as the "Festival de la canción boliviana" better known as "Aquí, canta Bolivia" (Here, Bolivia Sings), also the Festival de Música Barroca from Chiquitos and Sucre, the concerts of Los Kjarkas around the world.

As a way of broadcasting sporting events, as of 2011, Bolivia TV broadcasts national tennis, basketball and tennis tournaments, in addition to the Juegos Estudiantiles Plurinacionales organized by the Central Government. Since 2011, "La Carrera de Automovilismo, Presidente Evo Morales" and "La Carrera Pedestre" have been broadcast, also organized by the Government. As for football, the state-owned company signed the broadcasting rights contract for the games of the "Liga del Fútbol Profesional Boliviano", both Nacional A and Nacional B. (including the Bolivian Cup final) and the World Cup Qualifying matches in both 2010 and 2014. It also broadcasts boxing tournaments, especially those in which the compatriot and world title winner Jennifer Salinas participates.

From January 2012 to the beginning of 2013, Bolivia TV broadcast children's productions from the Nelvana catalog but it was not successful, especially in the city of El Alto due to the claims of social organizations. Faced with this situation, the children's block was eliminated from the programming of the channel.

In mid-2013, show business was added to the program, in addition to international fashion events such as The Fashion Parade at the Salar de Uyuni.

In 2014, BTV's programming was expanded with the transmission of the Baroque Music Concert in Concepción, followed by the concert by Los Kjarkas, the final of the Nacional B, the last friendlies of the Bolivian team against Spain and Greece, and the transmission of the World Cup 2014.

From 2015 to 2018, Bolivia TV broadcast the UEFA Champions League. Since 2014, it broadcast the FIFA World Cup in association with Unitel and Red Uno.

== Network ==
Bolivia TV delivers its terrestrial signal over 72 transmitters spread across the country.

Bolivia TV's network (Empresa Estatal de Televisión "Bolivia TV")
Location	Channel
Magdalena, Beni	8
Reyes, Beni	8
Riberalta, Beni	7
Rurrenabaque-San Buenaventura, Beni	7
Magdalena, Beni	8
San Borja, Beni	7
San Ignacio de Moxos, Beni	7
San Joaquín, Beni	7
Santa Ana de Yacuma, Beni	7
Trinidad, Beni	7
Monteagudo, Chuquisaca	7
Sucre, Chuquisaca	7
Tarabuco, Chuquisaca	9
Capinota, Cochabamba	8
Chimore-Shinahota, Cochabamba	7
Cochabamba	7
Eterazama, Cochabamba	7
Independencia, Cochabamba	7
Mizque, Cochabamba	7
Valle Alto (Tarata, Punata, Cliza, Arani), Cochabamba	6
Villa Tunari-Villa 14 de Septiembre, Cochabamba	8
Achacachi, La Paz	7
Achacachi, La Paz	13
Caranavi, La Paz	7
Chulumani-Huancane, La Paz	7
Colquiri, La Paz	7
Colquiri, La Paz	9
Copacabana, La Paz	7
Coro Coro, La Paz	7
Coro Coro, La Paz	7
Coroico, La Paz	7
Desaguadero, La Paz	7
Guanay, La Paz	7
La Paz, La Paz	7
Sica Sica, La Paz	7
Tipuaní, La Paz	11
Antequera (Mina Bolívar), Oruro	10
Antequera (Mina Bolívar), Oruro	12
Challapata-Huari, Oruro	28
Curahuara de Carangas, Oruro	7
Huanuni, Oruro	12
Oruro, Oruro	7
Pazna, Oruro	7
Cobija, Pando	7
Fortaleza, Pando	10
Puerto Rico, Pando	7
Santa Rosa de Abuna, Pando	7
Betanzos, Potosí	8
Catavi, Llalagua, Siglo XX, Uncia, Potosí	8
Potosí, Potosí	7
Tupiza, Potosí	7
Uyuni, Potosí	7
Villazon, Potosí	7
Camiri, Santa Cruz	7
Concepción, Santa Cruz	7
El Torno, Santa Cruz	14
Okinawa, Santa Cruz	8
Portachuelo, Santa Cruz	14
Puerto Suarez-Puerto Quijarro, Santa Cruz	7
Robore, Santa Cruz	7
San Ignacio de Velasco, Santa Cruz	7
San Javier, Santa Cruz	7
San José de Chiquitos, Santa Cruz	7
San Julián, San Ramon, 4 Canadas, Santa Cruz	7
San Matías, Santa Cruz	7
San Pedro, Santa Cruz	8
Santa Cruz de la Sierra, Santa Cruz	7
Santiago de Chiquitos, Santa Cruz	7
Yapacani, Santa Cruz	7
Bermejo, Tarija	7
Tarija, Tarija	7
Villamontes, Tarija	7
Yacuiba, Tarija	7

As of 2025, Bolivia TV broadcasts on 276 DTT transmitters, carrying a multiplex of two channels (mapped nationwide to 7.1 and 7.2). The same transmitters carry the signal on analog TV (until switch-off). In 2020, 135 of the 276 transmitters lost signal "due to negligence or lack of maintenance". It would cost two million bolivianos to restore the network.

== Programming ==
- El Noticiero Mundial Informa (today Documentaries of TV Culturas) transferred to TV Culturas on July 15, 2013.
- Defensa del Consumidor
- Pedimos la Palabra, a program carried out by young people.
- Comunidad Sexual
- Parada Médica
- Vivir Bien, broadcast on health care.
- Espejos
- Análisis Arbitral.
- TV Congreso, broadcast live from the Plurinational Legislative Assembly.
- Jardín de Sol y Luna, a children's program about an upper-class family in La Paz.
- Brújula, a tourist program that shows festivities and customs from different parts of Bolivia.
- Chaco y Punto, a cultural program about the Chaco and northern Argentina.
- Axesso, national and international rock music program, but transferred to RTP.
- Showcase, musical program that aired in 2010, directed by Joaquín Carvajal, presenter Anthony Sandoval, later to become the established musician SEN.
- Children's programs drawn Nelvana's catalog. Citing as an example The Backyardigans and Rolie Polie Olie. Aired in 2012.
- La Cabina Azul, current affairs program with an informative nature on science, technology, innovation, pop culture, geek interests and specialized entertainment.
- Bolivia con Altura, documentary program of Bolivian folklore artists.

=== Programs broadcast on Canal 7.2 ===
- Magnolia, a program of reports for artists from various art fields.
- Kinema, reflecting the history of Bolivian cinema.
- Muyuspa, children's education program.

=== Programs broadcast until November 11, 2019 ===
- Amazonia al Día
- Estudio 7, a very interesting amenities program
- Markasana Arupa, bilingual news program (in Spanish and indigenous languages).
- Revolución Cultural, cultural program.
- Vivir Bien, program on health care.
- Gestión de Gobierno.
- El pueblo es noticia, in association with Radio Illimani.
- CD7 Canal de Deportes, produced by the sports journalist Gonzalo Cobo (Futbolmania Bolivia). Who also organized programs such as 5–7 Deportes and CD7 Regional.
- Con Sello Boliviano'.
- Área Restringida, an entertainment program for teenagers on youth issues.
- Kuma Jakaru, "From the entrails of the soul": Program that shows the folklore and culture of Bolivia, both nationally and internationally.
- TIEMPOS DE CAMBIO, a program that brings about the projects proposed by the president Evo Morales and even the events in the country. Program carried out by social movements related to the government and supporters of the Movimiento al Socialismo
- REWIND: Pop music program featuring music from the 70's, 80's and 90's, hosted by Vladimir Bravo who also participated in the Unitel network in the Endemol format, Yo me llamo.
- Entre Culturas: Also called "Bolivia Constituent: process of change", organized by indigenous social and cultural movements that supported the MAS-IPSP. Aired as of 2007, in the midst of the Bolivian Constituent Assembly of 2006.
- Russia Today documentaries
- Hashtag: Entertainment and interaction youth program.

=== Programs broadcast until December 31, 2019 ===
- SIN SECRETOS CON LIBERTAD: Pastry program, hosted by Libertad Aparicio and sponsored by ARPO BOLIVIA LTDA (distributor of Wilton products).

=== Programming until December 7, 2020 ===
- BTV News: Divided into:
  - Somos Bolivia: Morning magazine of general events.
  - Noticiero regional: Exclusive broadcast for a certain department and/or region. It broadcasts at 11:00, 15:00 and 17:00 with a duration of 1 hour.
  - Segunda Edición. Repeats at 9:00 p.m. and lasts 1 hour and 30 minutes.
  - Tercera Edición: Repeats at 22:30 and lasts 1 hour and a half.
  - Edición Medianoche. It lasts 30 minutes.
- Quechua/Aymara: content in the Aymara language.
- Reporte BTV
- Muyuspa, Program where children are educated to be good citizens, reflected by its protagonists, also children.
- Listos a jugar: Latin American spin-off of Sesame Street, seeks to promote correct eating, physical activity, hygiene, nutrition and preschool emotional well-being. The regional project is in partnership with the FEMSA Foundation, the Ministry of Health in Mexico, Canal Once, UNICEF, the Carlos Slim Foundation, and Ecuador TV, which promotes healthy habits.
- Héroes, Documentary series interviewing notable Bolivian athletes.
- Ciudad Museo, a cultural space that presents the museums and heritage sites that abound in the capital of Bolivia, Sucre.
- Bolivia Extrema, showing extreme sports from the most visited places in the country.
- BTV en concierto, a space dedicated to the music of Bolivian artists, such as folklore. Sometimes it is broadcast live.
- Diseño y Construcción.
- Hablemos: Talk show with themes towards a specific focus per chapter.
- Bolivia Agropecuaria
- The Legend of Bruce Lee
- Curiosamente: Animated Mini-Documentaries in collaboration with Estudio Haini in the form of drawings mixed with scientific and encyclopedic facts.
- Imaginario: It shows different types of cultures, both original and urban, from another point of view.
- El Chef sin Fronteras: Program with the style of cooking outside the studios, usually outdoors
- Magnolia
- Como Hans por su casa: Tourist program.
- Colores del Fútbol: Program in collaboration with the OAS.
- Accordes Bolivianos
- Hashtag 2.0
- 3600: Deportes Extremos
- Santa Misa (From the Episcopal Church: Also broadcast by PAT and Red Uno.)
- Resumen Deportivo
- Full Pesca TV Aventura: it was previously broadcast on Cadena A
- Lo mejor de José Mota, Spanish humorous program.
- Legend of Entrepreneurship: A series produced by China's state broadcaster CCTV, in association with Classic Media Films.

== Branding ==
Upon Jeanine Añez's entry to government, the logo turned white with the slogans Un canal en transición (A channel in transition) and Semilla de la democracia (Seed of democracy).

On December 27, 2019, the new branding was officially presented: A rhombus formed by a pita or also called pitita with the three characteristic colors of the Bolivian flag (red, yellow and green) along with the B. In the part Below is written the phrase Seed of Democracy. However, the institutional image is the previous brand of Bolivia TV, only with the colors of the Bolivian tricolor strip in the form of spots, in reference to the Bolivian carnival (specifically of Santa Cruz de la Sierra). Subsequently, at the beginning of 2020 it was removed, and the green leaf was reinserted, with the variation of inserting the letters "TV".

The current identity of the network was presented on December 7, 2020, at 7 pm, under the promotional title “El 7, a las 7, por el 7” (The 7th (of December), at 7, on (Channel) 7). The logo represents the following characteristics:

- The acronym "BTV" in capital letters and in white (if the backgrounds are contrasting);
- Semi-cut circles with the colors of red-yellow-green, alluding to the national tricolor.

They can also change with the colors of the Wiphala, but it is not used in the channel.

In the statement presented to the public, the following highlights: “With color, diversity and integration; channel 7 renews its image at 51 years of life. In addition, it highlights the unity, integrity, hope and culture of the Bolivian people.”

== Criticism and controversies ==
=== General ===
Bolivia TV under the government of Evo Morales was known for having propaganda figures fronting programs instead of regular presenters. The network was also known for its misinterpretation of news.

This phase was also marked by concerns over the network's supposed transparency, as the network was at the service of the ruling party.

TVB's main facilities in Santa Cruz de la Sierra were sacked by 160 young unionists on September 9, 2008. Footage of the sackings was carried by private networks.

From January to October 2012, Bolivia TV aired 482 live interventions from Evo Morales, at a total cost of Bs40 million, of which Bs 23.4 million were used for media outlets.

=== Suspension in the Bolivian political crisis of 2019 ===
After the siege of the mobilizations on November 10, 2019, from 12:00 to 16:30 Bolivia TV cut its broadcasts and replaced it with a letter of adjustment with the current logo of the channel. Then it transmitted from Chapare the resignation statement of Evo Morales and Álvaro García Linera who served as President and Vice President of the State respectively. Bolivia TV had its broadcast interrupted, with the channel's then-current logo appearing as a static image, due to all these situations that have happened in the country. After the inauguration of Jeanine Áñez, the channel returned to the air with informative and cultural programming.

=== Dismissal of Gonzalo Rivera ===
On March 6, 2020, the communications minister of Jeanine Áñez's administration, Isabel Fernández, dismissed the manager of Bolivia TV, journalist Gonzalo Rivera. Arguing and holding Rivera responsible for “coordination errors”, and specifically a cut in one of the Constitutional President's speeches, according to Fernández's version. This caused repercussions both in the professional and political environment, of which Gonzalo Rivera himself accused President Áñez of imposing programs very similar to those of the previous government, this accusation was published on the social network Facebook. Subsequently, on March 9, 2020, Minister Fernández appointed Andrés Rojas as general manager of the state channel.

On February 8, 2024, the network signed a contract (which expired on May 31) worth 8 million bolivianos for the exploitation of political advertising. The official documents did not specify the number of airings, only the cost, on both the main channel and the second channel.

=== Public spending on political advertising ===
On May 7, 2020, the Minister of Communication, Isabel Fernández, revealed information that from 2011 to 2019, spending on advertising for Evo Morales' administration reached 1,718 million bolivianos, of which 111.2 million Bolivians went to the state channel, and the rest were mentioned to the national channels ATB, PAT, Red Uno, Bolivisión, Abya Yala TV, RTP Bolivia, Cadena A and Gigavisión that were involved in said multimillion-dollar waste, followed by Unitel and other media in Bolivia.

=== Public spending on presidential agenda and government management ===
Between 2021 and 2023, Bolivia TV spent more than 40 million bolivianos for the broadcast of live government events, either from the presidential agenda or from the management of its government, instead of solving the country's economical crisis. The most expensive of these broadcasts was on February 4, 2022, costing close to 10 million bolivianos. Between February 2 and October 4, 2024, alone, Bolivia TV spent a similar quantity (40.5 million bolivianos) for both political advertising and government agenda purposes. The cost of broadcasting per act varied, with the trunk axis (La Paz, Cochabamba and Santa Cruz) receiving the cheapest prices (around 50,500 Bs for a live broadcast), while in less developed areas, the cost went as far as close to 71,000 Bs.

=== Facebook misinformation claim ===
Users sharing posts from its Facebook page received a warning in late October 2022 saying that the post contained false information as reviewed by independent fact checkers. The fact caused concerns regarding the heavy political influence held by the network.
