= Red Universitaria Boliviana de Información =

Red Universitaria Boliviana de Información (Bolivian University Information Network), also known as Red RUBI, is a loose network of Bolivian television stations owned by universities. Unlike other networks, it doesn't provide a single national signal, instead depending on each of its nine members, located in departmental capitals, generating local programming. Stations are financed by their respective universities and primarily deliver local interest programming and little educational content. The idea of a network for the university channels originated from Oruro, having consolidated the goal, but without obtaining the adequate technological conditions.

The Pando, Sucre and La Paz stations are available nationwide using the Bolivian TKSAT-1 satellite. The Pando and Sucre stations are uplinked by the Bolivian Space Agency and the La Paz station is uplinked by Entel.

Members of the network frequently gather to co-ordinate on several parameters of its framework.

== Network ==
Stations given to Red Universitaria de información
| Location | Channel |
|---|---|
| Trinidad | 11 |
| Sucre | 13 |
| Cochabamba | 11 |
| La Paz | 13 |
| Oruro | 13 |
| Llallagua | SRTV |
| Potosí | 9 |
| Santa Cruz de la Sierra | 13 |
| Tarija | 9 |
