= 69th Berlin International Film Festival =

2019 film festival in Berlin, Germany

- Festival poster
- Opening film: The Kindness of Strangers
- Closing film: Synonyms
- Location: Berlin, Germany
- Founded: 1951
- Awards: Golden Bear: Synonyms
- Festival date: 7–17 February 2019
- Website: http://www.berlinale.de

Berlin International Film Festival chronology
- 70th 68th

The 69th annual Berlin International Film Festival took place from 7 to 17 February 2019. French actress Juliette Binoche served as the Jury President.

Lone Scherfig's drama film The Kindness of Strangers opened the festival. The Golden Bear was won by Israeli-French drama Synonyms directed by Nadav Lapid, which also served as the closing film of the festival.

== Juries ==
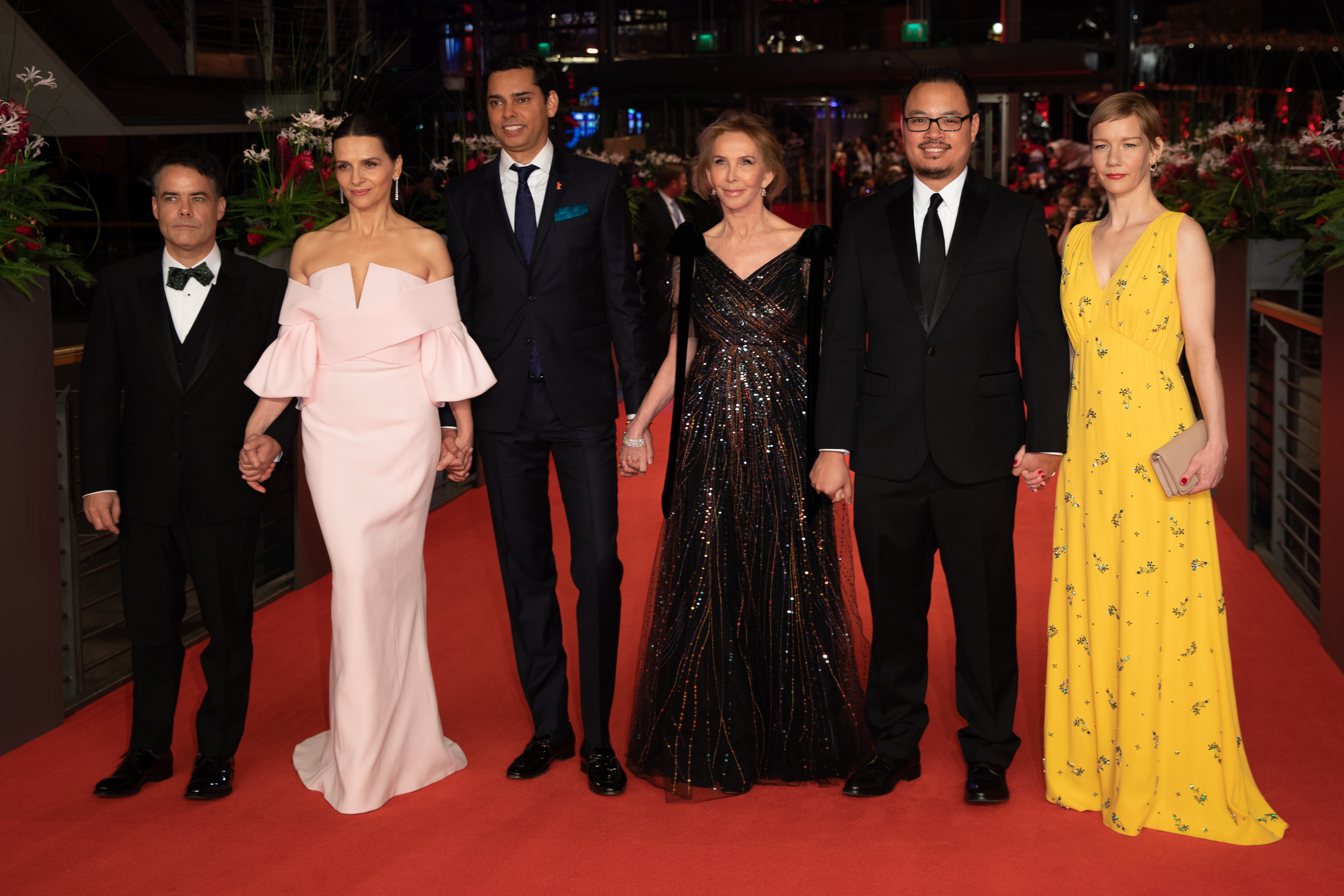
Main competition jury at the closing ceremony at Berlinale 2019 (from left to right): Sebastián Lelio, Juliette Binoche, Rajendra Roy, Trudie Styler, Justin Chang, and Sandra Hüller

=== Main competition ===
- Juliette Binoche, French actress - Jury President
- Justin Chang, American journalist and film critic
- Sandra Hüller, German actress
- Sebastián Lelio, Chilean film director and screenwriter
- Rajendra Roy, American chief curator of MoMA
- Trudie Styler, British actress, producer and film director

=== First Feature Award Jury ===
- Katja Eichinger, German journalist, writer and film producer
- Alain Gomis, French filmmaker
- Vivian Qu, Chinese filmmaker and producer

=== Documentary Award Jury ===
- Maria Bonsanti, Italian artistic director and director of the Eurodoc program
- Gregory Nava, American film director, screenwriter and producer
- Maria Ramos, Brazilian film director

=== International Short Film Jury ===
- Jeffrey Bowers, American curator
- Vanja Kaludjercic, Croatian programmer and purchasing director of MUBI
- Koyo Kouoh, Cameroonian author, curator and artistic director of RAW Material Company

== Official Sections ==
=== Main Competition ===
The following films were selected for the main competition for the Golden Bear and Silver Bear awards:

English title	Original title	Director(s)	Production country
By the Grace of God	Grâce à dieu	François Ozon	France
Elisa & Marcela	Elisa y Marcela	Isabel Coixet	Spain
Ghost Town Anthology	Répertoire des villes disparues	Denis Côté	Canada
God Exists, Her Name Is Petrunija	Господ постои, името ѝ е Петрунија	Teona Strugar Mitevska	Belgium, Croatia, France, Macedonia, Slovenia
The Golden Glove	Der Goldene Handschuh	Fatih Akin	France, Germany
The Ground Beneath My Feet	Der Boden unter den Füßen	Marie Kreutzer	Austria
The Kindness of Strangers (opening film)		Lone Scherfig	Canada, Denmark, France, Germany, Sweden, United Kingdom, United States
I Was at Home, But	Ich war zuhause, aber	Angela Schanelec	Germany, Serbia
Mr Jones		Agnieszka Holland	Poland, Ukraine, United Kingdom
Öndög		Wang Quan'an	Mongolia
Out Stealing Horses	Ut og stjæle hester	Hans Petter Moland	Denmark, Norway, Sweden
Piranhas	La paranza dei bambini	Claudio Giovannesi	Italy
So Long, My Son	地久天長	Wang Xiaoshuai	China
Synonyms	Synonymes	Nadav Lapid	France, Germany, Israel
System Crasher	Systemsprenger	Nora Fingscheidt	Germany
A Tale of Three Sisters	Kız Kardeşler	Emin Alper	Germany, Greece, Netherlands, Turkey

=== Out of competition ===
The following films were selected to be screened out of competition:

English title	Original title	Director(s)	Production country
Amazing Grace		Alan Elliott	United States
Farewell to the Night	L'adieu à la nuit	André Téchiné	France, Germany
Marighella		Wagner Moura	Brazil
The Operative		Yuval Adler	France, Germany, Israel, United States
Varda by Agnès	Varda par Agnès	Agnès Varda	France
Vice		Adam McKay	United States

=== Panorama ===
The following films were selected for the Panorama section:

English title	Original title	Director(s)	Production country
37 Seconds	37秒	Hikari	Japan
Acid	Кислота	Alexander Gorchilin	Russia
All My Loving	Geschwister	Edward Berger	Germany
The Breath	Der Atem	Uli M Schueppel	Germany
Brief Story from the Green Planet	Breve historia del planeta verde	Santiago Loza	Argentina, Brazil, Germany, Spain
Buoyancy		Rodd Rathjen	Australia
Chained	עינויים שלי	Yaron Shani	Israel, Germany
Dafne		Federico Bondi	Italy
The Day After I'm Gone	היום שאחרי לאחת	Nimrod Eldar	Israel
Divine Love	Divino Amor	Gabriel Mascaro	Brazil, Chile, Denmark, Norway, Sweden, Uruguay
A Dog Barking at the Moon	再见南屏晚钟	Xiang Zi	China, Spain
Family Members	Los miembros de la familia	Mateo Bendesky	Argentina
Flatland		Jenna Bass	South Africa, Germany, Luxembourg
Flesh Out		Michela Occhipinti	Italy
Greta*		Armando Praça	Brazil
Hellhole		Bas Devos	Belgium, Netherlands
Holy Beasts	La fiera y la fiesta	Laura Amelia Guzmán and Israel Cárdenas	Dominican Republic, Argentina, Mexico
Idol	우상	Lee Su-jin	South Korea
Jessica Forever		Caroline Poggi, Jonathan Vinel	France
Light of My Life		Casey Affleck	United States
Mid90s		Jonah Hill	United States
Midnight Traveler		Hassan Fazili	Canada, Qatar, United Kingdom, United States
The Miracle of the Sargasso Sea*	To thávma tis thálassas ton Sargassón	Syllas Tzoumerkas	Germany, Greece, Netherlands, Sweden
Monos		Alejandro Landes	Argentina, Colombia, Denmark, Germany, Netherlands, Sweden, Uruguay
O Beautiful Night	Doch wir lächeln zurück	Xaver Xylophon	Germany
The Shadow Play	风中有朵雨做的云	Lou Ye	China
Skin		Guy Nattiv	United States
The Souvenir		Joanna Hogg	United Kingdom, United States
Staff Only		Neus Ballús	France, Spain
Stitches	Šavovi	Miroslav Terzić	Bosnia and Herzegovina, Croatia, Serbia, Slovenia
Tremors	Temblores	Jayro Bustamante	France, Guatemala, Luxembourg
Panorama Dokumente
Beauty and Decay	Schönheit & Vergänglichkeit	Annekatrin Hendel	Germany
A Dog Called Money		Seamus Murphy	Ireland, United Kingdom
Lemebel		Joanna Reposi Garibaldi	Chile, Colombia
Normal		Adele Tulli	Italy, Sweden
On the Starting Line	La Arrancada	Aldemar Matias	Brazil, Cuba, France
Searching Eva		Pia Hellenthal	Germany
Selfie		Agostino Ferrente	France, Italy
Serendipity		Prune Nourry	United States
Shooting the Mafia		Kim Longinotto	Ireland, United Kingdom
System K	Système K	Renaud Barret	France
Talking About Trees		Suhaib Gasmelbari	Chad, France, Germany, Qatar, Sudan
Waiting for the Carnival	Estou Me Guardando Para Quando O Carnaval Chegar	Marcelo Gomes	Brazil
Western Arabs		Omar Shargawi	Denmark, Netherlands
What She Said: The Art of Pauline Kael		Rob Garver	United States

=== Berlinale Special ===
The following films were selected for the Berlinale Special section:

English title	Original title	Director(s)	Production country
Anthropocene: The Human Epoch		Jennifer Baichwal, Nicholas de Pencier and Edward Burtynsky	Canada
The Boy Who Harnessed the Wind		Chiwetel Ejiofor	United Kingdom
Brecht		Heinrich Breloer	Austria, Germany, Czech Republic
The North	El Norte	Gregory Nava	United Kingdom, United States
Gully Boy		Zoya Akhtar	India
It Could Have Been Worse – Mario Adorf	Es hätte schlimmer kommen können – Mario Adorf	Dominik Wessely	Germany
Kids in the Spotlight	Lampenfieber	Alice Agneskirchner	Germany
Peter Lindbergh – Women Stories		Jean Michel Vecchiet	Germany
Photograph		Ritesh Batra	Germany, India, United States
Watergate		Charles Ferguson	United States
Who You Think I Am	Celle que vous croyez	Safy Nebbou	France
You Only Live Once – Die Toten Hosen on Tour	Weil du nur einmal lebst – Die Toten Hosen auf Tour	Cordula Kablitz-Post	Germany

=== Short Film Competition ===
The following films were selected for the Berlinale Shorts section:

English title	Original title	Director(s)	Production country
All on a Mardi Gras Day		Michal Pietrzyk	United States
The Station (out of competition)	Al Mahatta	Eltayeb Mahdi	Sudan
Blue Boy		Manuel Abramovich	Argentina/Germany
Can't You See Them? - Repeat.		Clarissa Thieme	Germany/Bosnia and Herzegovina
Red Rubber Boots (out of competition)	Crvene gumene čizme	Jasmila Žbanić	Bosnia/Herzegovina
Entropia		Flóra Anna Buda	Hungary
Flexible Bodies		Louis Fried	Germany
Héctor		Victoria Giesen Carvajal	Chile
How to Breathe in Kern County		Chris Filippone	United States
It has to be lived once and dreamed twice		Rainer Kohlberger	Germany/Austria
Kingdom		Tan Wei Keong	Singapore
The Golden Legend	Leyenda dorada	Chema García Ibarra, Ion de Sosa	Spain
Mr. Mare	Lidérc úr	Luca Tóth	Hungary/France
Blessed Land	Mot Khu Dat Tot	Pham Ngoc Lan	Vietnam
In Between	Në Mes	Samir Karahoda	Kosovo
Omarska		Varun Sasindran	France
Past Perfect		Jorge Jácome	Portugal
Catching Fire	Prendre feu	Michaël Soyez	France
Palace of Colours	Rang Mahal	Prantik Basu	India
Rise		Bárbara Wagner, Benjamin de Burca	Brazil/Canada/USA
Shakti		Martín Rejtman	Argentina/Chile
The Spirit Keepers of Makuta'ay		Yen-Chao Lin	Canada
Splash		Shen Jie	China
Watermelon Juice	Suc de síndria	Irene Moray	Spain
Umbra		Florian Fischer, Johannes Krell	Germany
World on Board	Welt an Bord	Eva Könnemann	Germany

== Official Awards ==
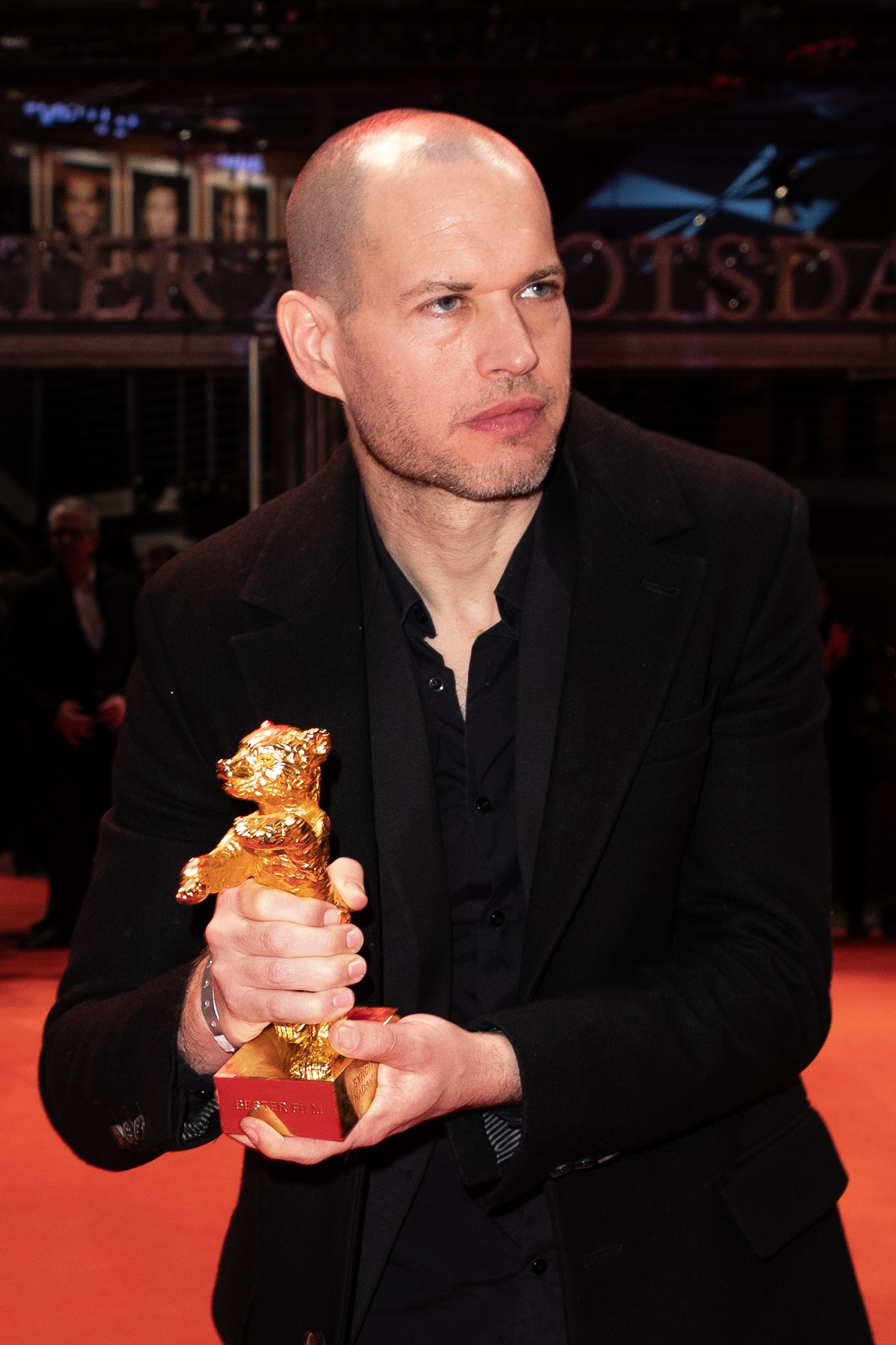
Nadav Lapid with Golden Bear at the closing ceremony at Berlinale 2019

The following prizes were awarded:

=== Main Competition ===
- Golden Bear: Synonyms by Nadav Lapid
- Silver Bear Grand Jury Prize: By the Grace of God by François Ozon
- Alfred Bauer Prize: System Crasher by Nora Fingscheidt
- Silver Bear for Best Director: Angela Schanelec for I Was at Home, But
- Silver Bear for Best Actress: Yong Mei for So Long, My Son
- Silver Bear for Best Actor: Wang Jingchun for So Long, My Son
- Silver Bear for Best Screenplay: Maurizio Braucci, Claudio Giovannesi and Roberto Saviano for Piranhas
- Silver Bear for Outstanding Artistic Contribution: Rasmus Videbæk for Out Stealing Horses (Cinematography)

=== Golden Bear for Best Short Film ===
- Umbra by Florian Fischer and Johannes Krell

=== Panorama ===
==== Panorama Audience Award ====
- 1st Place: 37 Seconds by Hikari
- 2nd Place: Stitches by Miroslav Terzić
- 3rd Place: Buoyancy by Rodd Rathjen

==== Panorama Audience Award – Documentaries ====
- 1st Place: Talking About Trees by Suhaib Gasmelbari
- 2nd Place: Midnight Traveler by Hassan Fazili and Emelie Mahdavian
- 3rd Place: Shooting the Mafia by Kim Longinotto

=== Generation ===
==== Generation 14Plus ====
- Crystal Bear for Best Film: Stupid Young Heart by Selma Vilhunen
  - Special Mention: We Are Little Zombies by Makoto Nagahisa
- Crystal Bear for Best Short Film: Tattoo by Farhad Delaram
  - Special Mention: Four Quartets by Marco Alessi

==== Generation KPlus ====
- Grand Prix of the Generation 14plus International Jury for the Best Film: House of Hummingbird by Kim Bo-ra
  - Special Mention: Bulbul Can Sing by Rima Das
- Special Prize of the Generation 14plus International Jury for the Best Short Film: Liberty by Faren Humes
  - Special Mention: The Jarariju Sisters by Jorge Cadena

== Independent Awards ==
=== Teddy Award ===
- Best Feature Film: Brief Story from the Green Planet by Santiago Loza
- Best Documentary/Essay Film: Lemebel by Joanna Reposi Garibaldi
- Best Short Film: Entropia by Flóra Anna Buda
- Special Jury Award: A Dog Barking at the Moon by Xiang Zi
- Special Teddy Award: Falk Richter
- TEDDY Readers’ Award Powered by QUEER.DE: Brief Story from the Green Planet by Santiago Loza

=== FIPRESCI Prize ===
- Competition: Synonyms by Nadav Lapid
- Panorama: Dafne by Federico Bondi
- Forum: Die Kinder der Toten by Kelly Copper and Pavol Liska

=== Prize of the Ecumenical Jury ===
- Competition: God Exists, Her Name Is Petrunija by Teona Strugar Mitevska
- Panorama: Buoyancy by Rodd Rathjen
  - Special Mention: Midnight Traveler by Hassan Fazili and Emelie Mahdavian
- Forum: Earth by Nikolaus Geyrhalter

=== CICAE Art Cinema Award ===
- Panorama: 37 Seconds by HIKARI
- Forum: Our Defeats by Jean-Gabriel Périot

=== Berliner Morgenpost Readers' Jury Award ===
- System Crasher by Nora Fingscheidt

=== Tagesspiegel Readers' Jury Award ===
- Monsters. by Marius Olteanu

=== Guild Film Prize ===
- God Exists, Her Name Is Petrunija by Teona Strugar Mitevska

=== Caligari Film Prize ===
- Heimat Is A Space in Time by Thomas Heise

=== Heiner Carow Prize ===
- Beauty and Decay by Annekatrin Hendel

=== Compass-Perspektive-Award ===
- Born in Evin by Maryam Zaree

=== Kompagnon-Fellowship ===
- Perspektive Deutsches Kino: To Be Continued by Julian Pörksen
- Berlinale Talents: Transit Times by Ana-Felicia Scutelnicu

=== ARTEKino International Prize ===
- A Responsible Adult by Shira Geffen

=== Eurimages Co-Production Development Award ===
- Avalon PC for Alcarràs

=== VFF Talent Highlight Award ===
- Vincenzo Cavallo for Bufis

=== Amnesty International Film Award ===
- Your Turn by Eliza Capai

=== Label Europa Cinemas ===
- Stitches by Miroslav Terzić

=== Peace Film Prize ===
- Your Turn by Eliza Capai
  - Special Mention:
    - System K by Renaud Barret
    - Midnight Traveler by Hassan Fazili and Emelie Mahdavian
