= List of Israeli films of 2009 =

A list of films produced by the Israeli film industry in 2009.

== 2009 releases ==
Premiere		Title	Director	Cast	Genre	Notes	Ref
A P R	27	A Matter of Size (Hebrew: סיפור גדול, lit. "A Big Story")	Sharon Maymon and Erez Tadmor		Comedy/Drama/Sport	Israeli-French-German co-production	
M A Y	13	Carmel (Hebrew: כרמל)	Amos Gitai		Biography	Israeli-French-Italian co-production	
M A Y	16	Jaffa (Hebrew: כלת הים)	Keren Yedaya		Drama	Israeli-German-French co-production; Special screening at the 2009 Cannes Film Festival	
M A Y	20	Einayim Pekukhoth (Hebrew: עיניים פקוחות, lit. "Eyes Wide Open")	Haim Tabakman		Drama	Israeli-German-French co-production; Competing at the 2009 Cannes Film Festival	
M A Y	22	Ajami (Hebrew: עג'מי)	Scandar Copti and Yaron Shani		Crime/Drama	Israeli-German co-production; Nominated for the Academy Award for Best Foreign Language Film	
J U N	7	The Loners (Hebrew: הבודדים, lit. "The Loners")	Renen Schorr		Drama		
S E P	8	Lebanon (Hebrew: לבנון)	Samuel Maoz		Drama/War	Israeli-French-Lebanese-German co-production; Won the Leone d'Oro at the 66th Venice International Film Festival	
S E P	13	The Assassin Next Door (Hebrew: קירות, lit. "Walls")	Danny Lerner	Olga Kurylenko, Ninette Tayeb, Liron Levo	Action, Drama	Israeli-French-American co-production	
S E P	14	Phobidilia (Hebrew: פובידיליה)	Doron Paz and Yoav Paz		Drama		
S E P	15	Bena (Hebrew: בנא)	Niv Klainer		Drama	Israeli-French co-production	

== Awards ==
=== Ophir Award ===
Category	Winners
Best Film	Ajami
Best Director	Yaron Shani and Scandar Copti; Ajami
Best Actor	Sasha Agronov; The Loners
Best Actress	Irit Kaplan; A Matter of Size
Best Supporting Actor	Zohar Strauss; Lebanon
Best Supporting Actress	Levana Finkelstein; A Matter of Size
Best Cinematography	Giora Bejach; Lebanon
Best Screenplay	Yaron Shani and Scandar Copti; Ajami
Best Composer	Rabii Bukhari; Ajami
Best Original Score	David Lees and Alex Claude; Lebanon
Best Documentary Feature	The Shakshouka System
Lifetime Achievement Award	Assi Dayan

=== Wolgin Award ===
Category	Winners
Best Feature Film	Ajami
Best Documentary	Diplomat
Best Short Film	Guided Tour

== Notable deaths ==
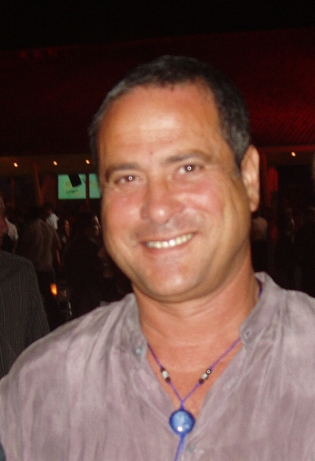
Dudu Topaz

- 20 August – Dudu Topaz, 62, Israeli actor - suicide by hanging. (born 1946)

== See also ==
- 2009 in Israel
