= Naomi Levari =

German-American-Israeli film producer and story editor

- נעמי לבארי
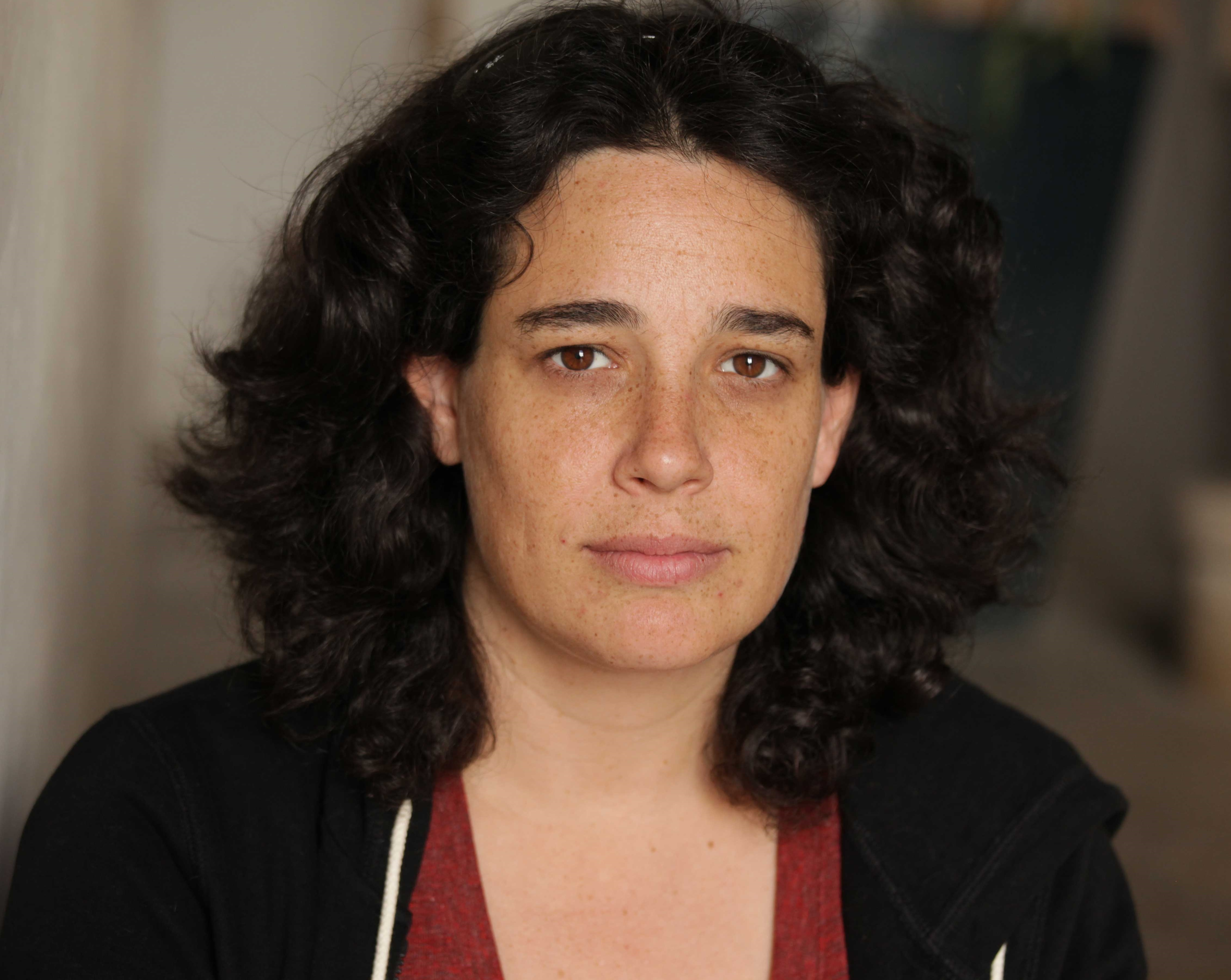
- Levari in 2019
- Born: October 10, 1978 (age 47)
- Education: Sam Spiegel Film and Television School (summa cum laude, 2004)
- Occupations: Film producer, story editor
- Years active: 2004–present
- Notable work: Love Trilogy: Chained; Love Trilogy: Stripped; Fig Tree
- Awards: Hamburg Film Festival, Gan Award Cannes Film Festival, Israeli Television Academy Award for Best Series (2x)

Naomi Levari (Hebrew: נעמי לבארי; born October 10, 1978) is a German-American-Israeli film producer, development executive, and script consultant. She is the co-founder of Black Sheep Film Productions (Tel Aviv, 2010) and Electric Sheep GmbH (Berlin, 2018). Her work has premiered at the Cannes Film Festival, Berlin International Film Festival, Venice International Film Festival, Toronto International Film Festival, and Series Mania, accumulating over 100 international awards, including two Israeli Television Academy Awards for Best Series.

== Early life and education ==
Levari was born in 1978 in the United States. From 1992 to 1996, she attended the Charles E. Smith Arts High School in Jerusalem, majoring in film. During those years, she was an active community organizer and youth group leader in Jerusalem.

In 1996, Levari refused compulsory military service in Israel as a conscientious objector.

In 2004, Levari graduated from the Sam Spiegel Film and Television School in Jerusalem with highest honors (summa cum laude). During her studies, she co-produced Oneg Shabat (dir. Michal Brezis and Oded Ben-Nun), a short film that went on to win multiple awards, and produced the documentary Blue White Collar Criminal (dir. Noam Kaplan), the first student film to be released commercially in the school's history.

Her graduation film, Draft, which she wrote and directed, screened at more than forty international film festivals, won four awards and two special mentions, and was sold to broadcasters worldwide. The film was selected as one of the best films in Sam Spiegel's history by an international jury of festival programmers, and has been included in academic curricula. Following its success, Levari was invited to lead a master class at Aarhus University in Denmark, titled Big Drama in Short Films.

During her studies, Levari received multiple scholarships and prizes, including the America-Israel Cultural Foundation scholarship, the Jerusalem Economic Corporation Prize, the Mayor's Prize, and production grants from the Television Authority and the Yehoshua Rabinowitz Foundation.

In 2017, Levari relocated to Berlin, Germany.

== Career ==
=== Producing ===
In 2005, Levari began her professional collaboration with producer Saar Yogev during the Jerusalem Film Festival. In 2008, the two began producing together, and in 2010 they co-founded Black Sheep Film Productions in Tel Aviv. The company has produced films and television series that have premiered at international festivals including Cannes, the Berlin International Film Festival, the Venice International Film Festival, the Toronto International Film Festival, and Series Mania. In 2011, Levari participated in the International Film Festival Rotterdam's Rotterdam Lab, a workshop for emerging producers. In 2013, she was invited by the French CNC to participate in a producers' program connected with the Cannes Film Festival. In 2016, she and director Yaron Shani presented the Love Trilogy as part of an international producers' program. In 2018, Levari co-founded Electric Sheep GmbH, a Berlin-based production company focused on international co-productions, together with Saar Yogev and Michael Reuter. The company's first feature co-production, Victim, premiered at the Venice International Film Festival, received the Producers' Award at Filmfest Hamburg, and was selected as Slovakia's submission for the Academy Award for Best International Feature Film.

=== Script consulting, development and mentoring ===
Alongside her producing career, Levari works internationally as a script consultant, development executive and mentor. Since 2021, she has served as an editorial consultant for First Cut Lab, facilitating and moderating the artistic content of its working sessions. Her development work has also included Full Circle Lab Philippines, Canal+ Poland, Berlinale Script Station, and programs developed by Tatino Films with Netflix Grow Creative. Levari has served as a mentor and consultant for development programs including Berlinale Talents, Serial Eyes, the European Women's Audiovisual Network (EWA), the Łódź Film School, and Tatino Films' Pop Up Series Incubator. At the Łódź Film School, she has conducted screenplay-development workshops. In 2025, she was one of the expert mentors of the Pop Up Series Incubator, an eight-month development program that culminated in an industry showcase at the Karlovy Vary International Film Festival. In 2026, Levari was part of the team behind the inaugural Book-to-Screen at KVIFF initiative at the Karlovy Vary International Film Festival. The program was launched to strengthen cooperation between the publishing and audiovisual industries and to create a market for screen adaptation rights to literary works from Central and Eastern Europe.

=== Teaching and industry roles ===
Levari has lectured and taught at film schools, universities and professional development programs. She was a recurring lecturer at the Sam Spiegel Film and Television School from 2015 to 2021, teaching courses including production for screenwriters and workshops on pitching. She has also delivered guest lectures and master classes at Columbia University, Sapir Academic College, Beit Berl College and Aarhus University. Her professional teaching has included workshops for MIA, the Film Development Council of the Philippines, and the Script Consultant Lab in South Africa. From 2022 to 2023, she lectured at the Berlinale Co-Production Market on the role of the producer in the creative process. She has also moderated professional panels and case studies at the Berlinale Co-Production Market and the Berlinale Forum. Levari has served on juries, selection committees and as an industry reader for film festivals, funds and development programs. Her roles have included the Jerusalem Film Festival, the Israeli Academy of Film and Television, the Israel Film Fund, the Jerusalem International Film Lab, Berlinale Talents Script Station, the Berlinale Co-Production Market, Connecting Cottbus, Munich Film Up!, Utopia International Film Festival, the Tel Aviv International Student Film Festival, and the Berlinale Talents Alumni Station selection committee. Since 2021, Levari has been a member of the programming collective of the Jewish Film Festival Berlin Brandenburg.

== Activism ==
Levari has been a vocal advocate for social and political causes throughout her career. In 2013, she ran for the Knesset on the Da'am Workers Party list, headed by Asma Agbarieh-Zahalka, an Israeli-Palestinian socialist party advocating workers' rights and equality, though the party did not cross the electoral threshold.

During the 2014 Israel–Gaza conflict, Levari released a video message titled A Message to Gaza, which gained wide attention on social media. Levari refused to give interviews about the matter.

In 2026, Levari joined Protective Presence activities in the West Bank, supporting Palestinian communities facing settler violence.

== Filmography ==
Year	Title	Role	Notes
2003	Tzilibell	Producer	Short film
2003	Oneg Shabat (Sabbath Pleasure)	Co-producer	Short film
2004	Blue White Collar Criminal	Producer	Documentary film
2004	Draft	Producer, screenwriter, director	Short film Winner of 5 Awards
2006	Bsorot Tovot (Good Tidings)	Co-executive producer	Television Series
2010	Teacher Irena	Producer, screenwriter	Documentary film This film reached cult status in Israel, and opened the DocAviv Documentary Film Festival in Tel Aviv. It was nominated for an Ophir Award for Best Documentary.
2011	Ha-Chaim Ze Lo Ha-Kol (Life Isn't Everything)	Producer	Television Series; 21 episodes, season 9
2011	Ameer Got His Gun	Executive producer, screenwriter, director	Documentary film Winner of 4 Awards
2012	Batman at the Checkpoint	Executive producer	Short film
2012	Mishpacha Lo Bocharim (You Can't Choose Family)	Producer	Television Series
2013	Hanna's Journey	Co-producer	Feature film Screened at Berlinale, Was nominated for a German Academy Award
2014	Farewell Herr Schwarz	Co-producer	Documentary film Israeli Academy Awards Nominee, Won 10 awards at international film festivals
2015	A Bitter Mix	Executive producer	TV movie
2015	Split	Producer	Television series; 12 episodes
2016	One Week and a Day	Producer	Feature film Was nominated for 7 Ophir Awards, won an award at Cannes, and in total 15 international nominations and 8 wins
2016	Facing the Wall	Producer	Short film Nominated for an Israeli Academy Award, Winner of 5 Awards
2016	Mama's Angel	Producer	Television series; 10 episodes Official Selection Series Mania
2017	Me'ever Lakav	Producer	Short film Winner of 4 awards
2018	McMafia	Producer	Television series; 2 episodes
2018	Ceased to Be	Producer	Documentary film
2018	Love Trilogy: Stripped	Producer	Feature film World Premiere Venice International Film Festival, Nominated for 4 Israeli Academy Awards
2018	Fig Tree	Producer	Feature film World Premiere Toronto IFF, winner of 8 Awards including the prestigious Audentia Award, Nominated for 5 Israeli Academy Awards
2019	Love Trilogy: Chained	Producer	Feature film World Premiere Berlin International Film Festival, winner 2 Israeli Academy Awards. Best Film, Best actor, Audience Award Jerusalem Film Festival
2019	Border of Pain	Producer, screenwriter	Documentary film
2019	Love Trilogy: Reborn	Producer	Feature film
2020	The Prophet	Producer	Documentary film
2021	Promised Lands	Co-Producer	Documentary film
2021	Dismissed	Producer	TV series International Premiere - BANFF, Nominated for a Rocky Award. Winner of 10 Israeli TV Academy Awards
2021	Victim	Co-Producer	World Premiere Venice Film Festival, winner of 6 int'l Awards
2022	Dismissed 2	Producer	TV series, winner of 8 Israeli TV Academy Awards
2023	Innermost	Producer	Mini-series; 6 episodes. Created by Yaron Shani. World premiere Series Mania. Actor Eran Naim won Best Actor.
2023	The Return from the Other Planet	Producer	Documentary
2024	Dismissed 3	Producer	TV series
2024	The Water Front	Producer	Documentary film. Premiered in competition at DocAviv.
2025	The World Will Tremble	Producer	
