= Happy Holidays (film) =

2024 film by Scandar Copti

- Arabic: ينعاد عليكو
- Directed by: Scandar Copti
- Written by: Scandar Copti
- Produced by: Tony Copti; Jiries Copti; Dorothe Beinemeier; Jean Bréhat; Marco Valerio Fusco; Micaela Fusco
- Starring: Manar Shehab; Toufic Danial; Shani Dahari; Meirav Memoresky; Imad Hourani; Wafaa Aoun; Sophie Awaada; Raed Burbara
- Cinematography: Tim Kuhn
- Edited by: Scandar Copti
- Music by: Pascal Lemercier
- Production companies: Fresco Films; Red Balloon Film; Tessalit Productions; Intramovies
- Distributed by: Film Movement
- Release date: 4 September 2024 (Venice)
- Running time: 123 minutes
- Countries: Palestine; Germany; France; Italy; Qatar
- Languages: Arabic; Hebrew
- Box office: $86,094

Happy Holidays (Arabic: ينعاد عليكو, romanized: Yin'Ād Aliku, lit. 'May it be repeated for you') is a 2024 Palestinian family drama film written and directed by Scandar Copti. It is an international co-production. It premiered at the 81st Venice International Film Festival on 4 September 2024, where it won the "Orizzonti" (Horizons) Award for Best Screenplay. It is scheduled to have a limited theatrical release in the United States on 5 December 2025.

== Synopsis ==
The film is set in Jerusalem, and includes four stories with four main protagonists. Rami is a Palestinian man from Haifa with a Jewish girlfriend, Shirley, who changes her mind about a planned abortion. Rami's mother Hanan, is under financial pressure and encounters complications when trying to claim compensation for her daughter Fifi's accident. Fifi, meanwhile, has been involved in a clandestine affair. Miri is struggling with her teenage daughter's depression, and also trying to persuade her sister (Shirley) to terminate her pregnancy.

== Cast ==
- Manar Shehab as Fifi
- Toufic Danial as Rami
- Shani Dahari as Shirley, Rami's girlfriend
- Meirav Memoresky as Miri, Shirley's sister
- Imad Hourani as Fouad, Fifi and Rami's father
- Wafaa Aoun as Hanan, Fifi and Rami's mother
- Sophie Awaada as Leila, Fifi and Rami's sister
- Raed Burbara as Walid, Fifi's lover
- Essam Haddad as Hani

== Production ==
The film is written, directed, and edited by Scandar Copti, a Palestinian director with Israeli citizenship, who is known for his debut feature film Ajami (2009), which was nominated for an Oscar. He said that the inspiration for the film came from a conversation he overheard as an adolescent, with a woman who was his relative telling her son "Don't ever let a woman tell you what to do", referring to his wife. He later saw deeply entrenched patriarchal values in Israel, and wanted to challenge these norms.

The cast is composed entirely of non-professional actors. Copti said: "They're real people that come from the professional background of the characters that they portray. For example, Miri (Meirav Memoresky) is a real nurse, and Walid (Raed Burbara) is a real doctor."

Tim Kuhn was responsible for the cinematography, while the sound design was by Maximilien Gobiet, Pierre Tucat, and Matthias Schwab. Tony Copti, Jiries Copti, Jean Bréhat, Dorothe Beinemeier, Marco Valerio Fusco produced the film, through Fresco Films, Tessalit Productions, Red Balloon Film, and Intramovies. Producers in several countries were involved: Palestine, Germany, France, Italy, and Qatar.

== Themes ==
The film focuses on the female body, airing subjects such as pregnancy and sexuality, where society prevents total freedom for the women concerned.

In his acceptance speech for the "Orizzonti" Award for Best Screenplay, Copti stated, "Our film looks at how moral narratives can bring us together as communities, but also blind us to the suffering of others".

He also said:

The stories showcase good human beings trapped in a corrupt system. Through these stories, I hope to spark conversations about the values and beliefs shaping our lives and challenge viewers to rethink the norms they live by. No one is truly free until women are free, and no one is truly free until we all are free.

== Release ==
Indie Sales acquired the sales rights to the film in February 2024.

The film premiered at the 81st Venice International Film Festival on 4 September 2024 as part of the "Orizzonti" (Horizons) competition.

It also screened at many other major film festivals, including Toronto International Film Festival, Tallinn Black Nights Film Festival, Marrakech International Film Festival, Hamburg International Film Festival, 55th International Film Festival of India, and Thessaloniki Film Festival in 2024, and in 2025 at the 2025 Seattle International Film Festival, Melbourne International Film Festival, Palm Springs International Film Festival, Tromsø International Film Festival, Göteborg Film Festival, Istanbul Film Festival, International Film Festival Rotterdam, and Luxembourg City Film Festival.

Film Movement acquired the North American distribution rights to the film in January 2025. It plans a theatrical release followed by release to streaming platforms and DVD or Blu-Ray for the home entertainment market.

The film was released in Italy on 3 July 2025, with distribution by Fandango Distribuzione. It is scheduled to have a limited theatrical release in the United States on 5 December 2025.

== Reception ==
Lovia Gyarkye of The Hollywood Reporter called the film "a cleverly structured Palestinian drama" that "explores constriction and complicity in Israeli society".

Siddhant Adlakha of Variety called the film "a lively, naturalistic ensemble piece" and "a dynamic Palestinian family drama".

Olivia Popp of Cineuropa wrote, "Palestinian filmmaker Scandar Copti makes effective use of an ensemble cast in this portrait of contemporary family life in Israel, replete with its many intricacies".

Clotilde Chinnici of Loud and Clear Reviews gave the film three out of five stars and called it "a culturally necessary film that encourages us to question the status quo and be open to changing it".

Mina Takla of AwardsWatch gave the film a grade of B, stating that it "does not disappoint". She further wrote, "Boasting one of the year's most thoughtful and potent screenplays full of timely themes and rich characterization, the film is certain to find further appreciation as it continues its festival run."

Andrea Chimento wrote in the Italian newspaper 24 Ore that the film is "undoubtedly a thought-provoking drama, being extremely incisive and deeply political, even though Copti never delivers too shouty or didactic messages. Its cry of denunciation is subtle, brilliant and, although there are a few less successful characters than others, the chorus given to the story is nonetheless effective and entirely credible".

== Accolades ==
Award	Year	Category	Recipient(s)	Result	Ref.
Hamburg International Film Festival	2024	Kaleidoscope, Production Award	Happy Holidays	Won	
Marrakech International Film Festival	2024	Étoile d'Or	Happy Holidays	Won	
Marrakech International Film Festival	2024	Best Performance by an Actress	Wafaa Aoun and Manar Shehab	Won	
Thessaloniki International Film Festival	2024	Golden Alexander – Theo Angelopoulos Award	Happy Holidays	Won	
Tromsø International Film Festival	2025	Aurora Prize (the main film prize)	Happy Holidays	Won	
Venice Film Festival	2024	Orizzonti Award for Best Film	Happy Holidays	Nominated	
Venice Film Festival	2024	Orizzonti Award for Best Screenplay	Scandar Copti	Won	
