= Marrakech International Film Festival =

Annual film festival held in Marrakech, Morocco

Marrakech International Film Festival المهرجان الدولي للفيلم بمراكش ⴰⵏⵎⵓⴳⴳⴰⵔ ⴰⴳⵔⴰⵖⵍⴰⵏ ⵏ ⵍⴼⵉⵍⵎ ⴳ ⵎⵕⵕⴰⴽⵛ
- Location: Marrakesh, Morocco
- Founded: 2001; 25 years ago
- Most recent: 2025
- Awards: Étoile d'Or (Golden Star) – awarded as the festival's Grand Prize
- Festival date: Opening: 28 November 2025; Closing: 6 December 2025
- Language: Arabic; Amazigh; French; English
- Website: marrakech-festival.com

current: 22nd
- 23rd 21st

The Marrakech International Film Festival (Arabic: المهرجان الدولي للفيلم بمراكش, Amazigh: ⴰⵏⵎⵓⴳⴳⴰⵔ ⴰⴳⵔⴰⵖⵍⴰⵏ ⵏ ⵍⴼⵉⵍⵎ ⴳ ⵎⵕⵕⴰⴽⵛ; French: Festival International du Film de Marrakech) (FIFM) is an international film festival held annually in Marrakesh, Morocco. It was established in 2001 to promote cinematic arts and foster cultural exchange. The festival is organized by the Marrakech International Film Festival Foundation.

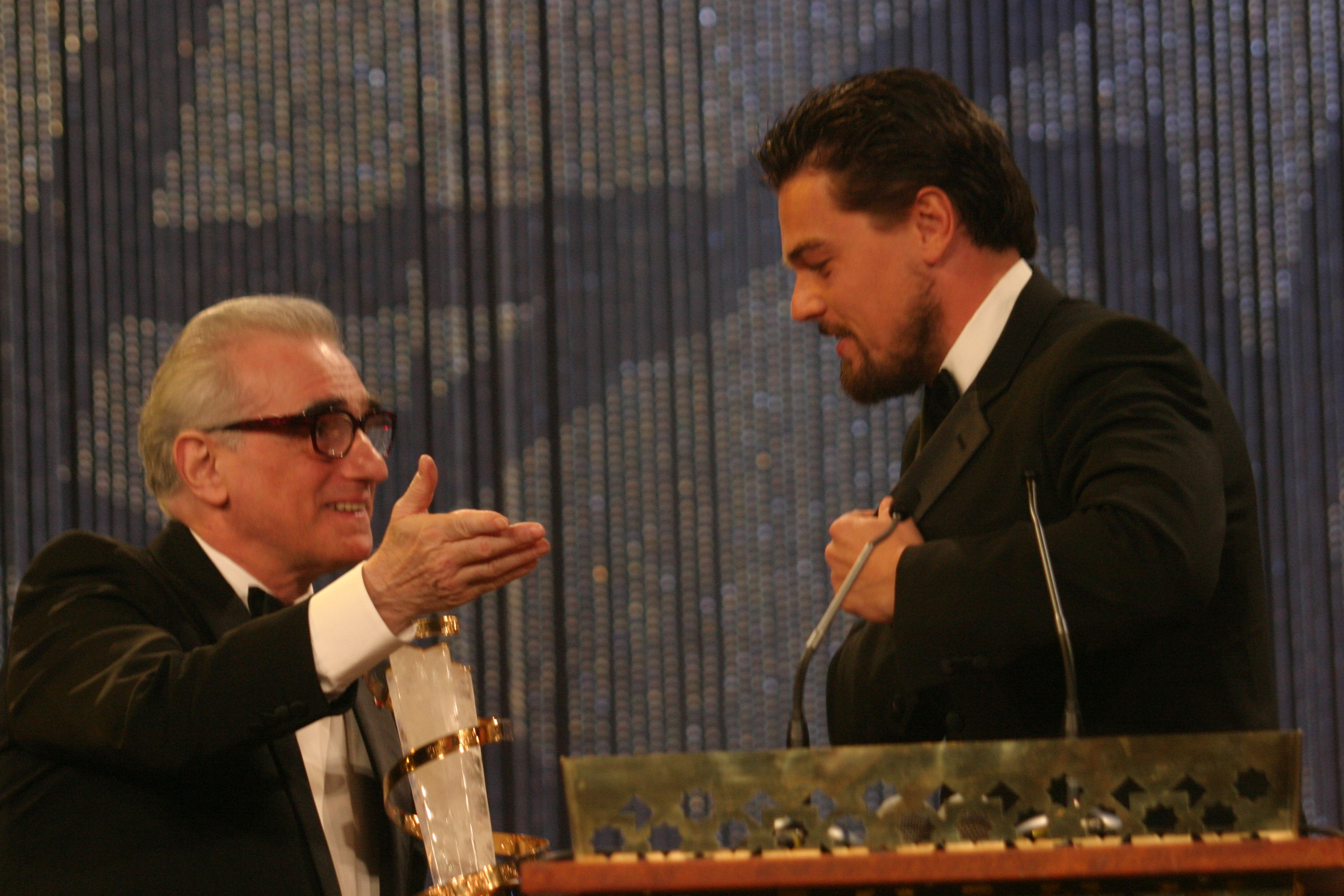
Martin Scorsese and Leonardo DiCaprio at FIFM 2007

== History ==
The International Film Festival of Marrakech was created in 2001. The initiative came from King Mohammed VI of Morocco, advised notably by French film producer Daniel Toscan du Plantier.

From the outset, the Marrakech International Film Festival was envisioned as an open platform for showcasing works from around the world, fostering cultural dialogue, and celebrating the art of cinema. Other objectives included supporting the development of the film industry in Morocco and promoting a positive image of the country internationally.

To provide an institutional framework for the event, King Mohammed VI established the Marrakech International Film Festival Foundation ahead of the festival's second edition in 2002, appointing Prince Moulay Rachid as its president.

Daniel Toscan du Plantier, who initially co-organized and led the festival, died in February 2003 from a heart attack at the age of 61. Following his death, his widow, Mélita Toscan du Plantier, who had previously served as director of external relations and protocol for the first two editions, was appointed director of the festival.

In 2004, the Marrakech International Film Festival Foundation revised its statutes and restructured the event's organization. Permanent offices were established in Marrakesh to provide a year-round base for the festival's activities. Two new vice-presidents were appointed: Nour-Eddine Saïl, Director General of the Centre cinématographique marocain, and Faïçal Laraïchi, President and CEO of the Société nationale de radiodiffusion et de télévision (SNRT). That same year, the co-organization of the festival was entrusted to the event agency Le Public Système Cinéma (part of the Hopscotch Groupe), represented by its president Lionel Chouchan and director general Bruno Barde. This collaboration between the Foundation and Le Public Système Cinéma remains the organizational model of the festival today.

In 2018, the Festival foundation launched the Atlas Workshops, to support emerging young Moroccan, Arab, and African filmmakers.

In 2023, the festival emphasized global diversity and showcased a special tribute to Moroccan cinema following the tragic earthquake that affected the region.

== Description ==
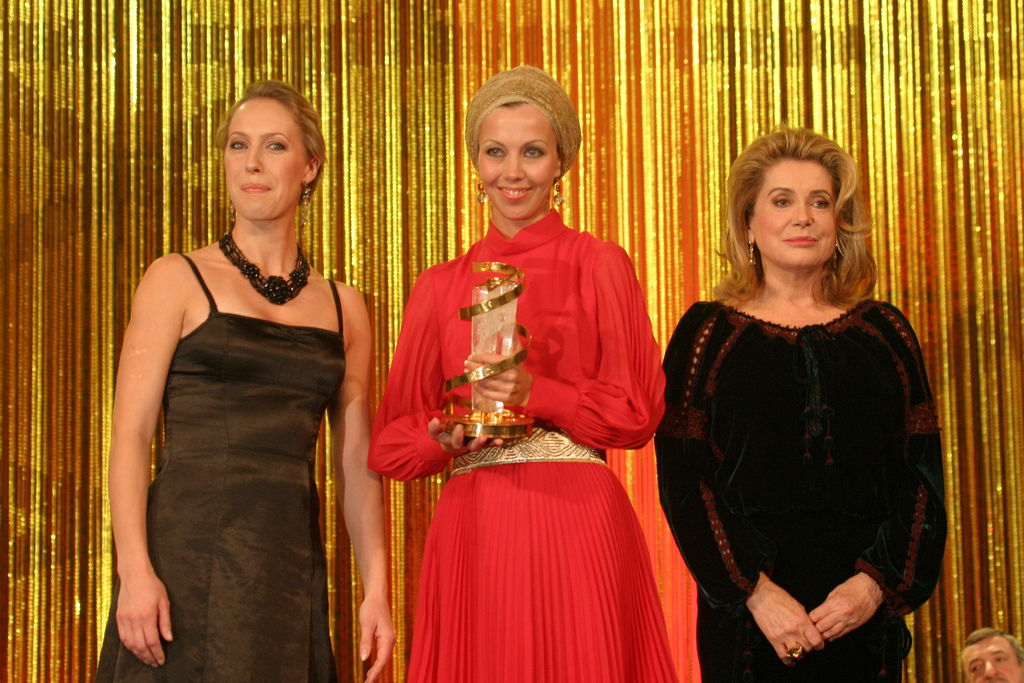
Katrin Kissa with the Étoile d'Or award for Autumn Ball (2007)

Recognized as one of the leading film festivals in the Arab world and Africa, the Marrakech International Film Festival attracts filmmakers, actors, and film industry professionals from around the globe. Its program typically features a range of international and regional films, including feature films, short films, and tributes to prominent figures in cinema. The event plays a significant role in supporting emerging artists and promoting dialogue between different cultures through film. FIFM has become one of the most prominent events celebrating Moroccan and international cinema.

As of 2025, FIFM is chaired by Prince Moulay Rachid of Morocco.

== Awards ==
At the 21st edition in 2024, the Étoile d'Or was awarded to the Palestinian film Happy Holidays, directed by Scandar Copti.

== Jury ==
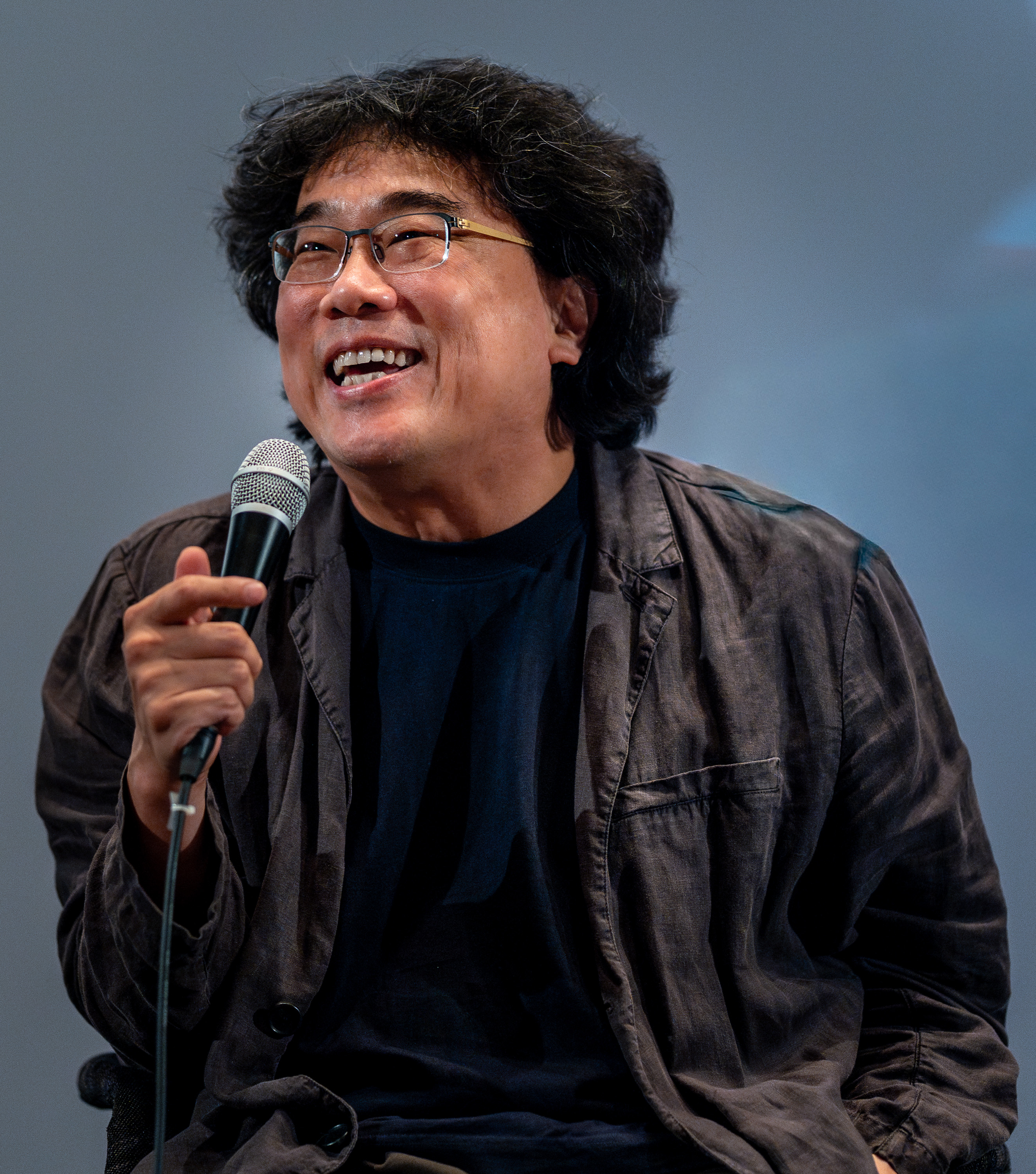
Bong Joon Ho, Chairman of the 2025 Jury

The festival's jury, composed of distinguished writers, actors and cultural figures, awards the best Moroccan and foreign feature and short films.

In 2013, the Jury of the 13th edition of the Marrakech International Film Festival included president of the jury Martin Scorsese and jury members Fatih Akin, Patricia Clarkson, Marion Cotillard, Amat Escalante, Golshifteh Farahani, Anurag Kashyap, Narjiss Nejjar, Park Chan-wook and Paolo Sorrentino, choosing award winners amongst the 15 international feature films in competition.

In 2022, the Jury of the 19th edition included Italian director Paolo Sorrentino serving as president, Danish writer/director Susanne Bier, American actor and producer Oscar Isaac, British actor Vanessa Kirby, German actor Diane Kruger, Australian director Justin Kurzel, Lebanese director and actor Nadine Labaki, Moroccan director Laïla Marrakchi and French-Algerian actor Tahar Rahim.

In 2023, the Jury of the 20th edition included American actress and producer Jessica Chastain serving as president, Iranian actor Zar Amir, French actor Camille Cottin, Australian actor and director Joel Edgerton, British director Joanna Hogg, American director Dee Rees, Swedish-Egyptian director Tarek Saleh, Swedish actor Alexander Skarsgård and French-Moroccan writer Leïla Slimani.

In 2024, the Jury of the 21st edition included Italian director Luca Guadagnino serving as president, Iranian-Danish director Ali Abbasi, Indian director Zoya Akhtar, American actress and director Patricia Arquette, Belgian-French actress Virginie Efira, Australian actor Jacob Elordi, British-American actor Andrew Garfield, Moroccan actress Nadia Kounda and Argentine director Santiago Mitre.

In 2025, the jury of the 22nd edition of the festival was chaired by the Korean filmmaker Bong Joon Ho. The other members of the jury were Jenna Ortega, Anya Taylor-Joy, Julia Ducournau, Celine Song, Karim Aïnouz, Hakim Belabbes and Payman Maadi.

== Ceremonies ==
| Edition | Year | President of the Jury | Best Film (Étoile d'Or Winner) | Director | Notes |
|---|---|---|---|---|---|
| 1st | 2001 | Jean-Pierre Jeunet | Inch'Allah Dimanche | Yamina Benguigui | First edition of the festival. |
| 2nd | 2002 | Jeanne Moreau | Go | Isao Yukisada | Focused on Asian cinema. |
| 3rd | 2003 | Roman Polanski | Gori vatra | Pjer Žalica | Strong presence of Balkan films. |
| 4th | 2004 | Alan Parker | Sideways | Alexander Payne | Homage to American independent cinema. |
| 5th | 2005 | Jean-Jacques Annaud | Saratan | Ernest Abdyshaparov | Central Asia spotlight. |
| 6th | 2006 | Miloš Forman | The Red Cockatoo | Dominik Graf | Tribute to German cinema. |
| 7th | 2007 | Michael Lonsdale | Autumn Ball | Veiko Õunpuu | Focus on Eastern European filmmakers. |
| 8th | 2008 | Barry Levinson | Wild Field (Dikoe Pole) | Mikhail Kalatozov | Strong Russian cinema representation. |
| 9th | 2009 | Abbas Kiarostami | Norteado | Rigoberto Pérezcano | Tribute to Latin American cinema. |
| 10th | 2010 | Emir Kusturica | The Journals of Musan | Park Jung-bum | Korean cinema recognized. |
| 11th | 2011 | Emir Kusturica | Out of Bounds | Frederikke Aspöck | Scandinavian cinema award. |
| 12th | 2012 | John Boorman | The Attack | Ziad Doueiri | Strong Arab cinema selection. |
| 13th | 2013 | Martin Scorsese | Han Gong-ju | Lee Su-jin | Homage to Asian emerging directors. |
| 14th | 2014 | Isabelle Huppert | Corrections Class | Ivan I. Tverdovsky | Focus on youth in cinema. |
| 15th | 2015 | Francis Ford Coppola | Very Big Shot | Mir-Jean Bou Chaaya | Lebanese cinema honored. |
| 16th | 2016 | Béla Tarr | The Donor | Zang Qiwu | China recognized for storytelling. |
| 17th | 2018 | James Gray | Joy | Sudabeh Mortezai | Austrian-Iranian filmmaker spotlight. |
| 18th | 2019 | Rebecca Zlotowski | Valley of Souls | Nicolás Rincón Gille | Latin America again prominent. |
| 19th | 2022 | Paolo Sorrentino | A Tale of Shemroon | Emad Aleebrahim Dehkordi | Iranian youth cinema focus. |
| 20th | 2023 | Jessica Chastain | The Mother of All Lies | Asmae El Moudir | Moroccan documentary awarded. |
| 21st | 2024 | Luca Guadagnino | Happy Holidays | Scandar Copti | Palestinian cinema recognition. |
| 22nd | 2025 | Bong Joon-ho | Promised Sky | Erige Sehiri | "A unique drama about marginalized African immigrant women fighting for their dignity and place not in Europe…but on their own continent" |

== See also ==
- Film festivals in Africa
