= Tom Mercier =

Israeli actor

- טום מרסייה
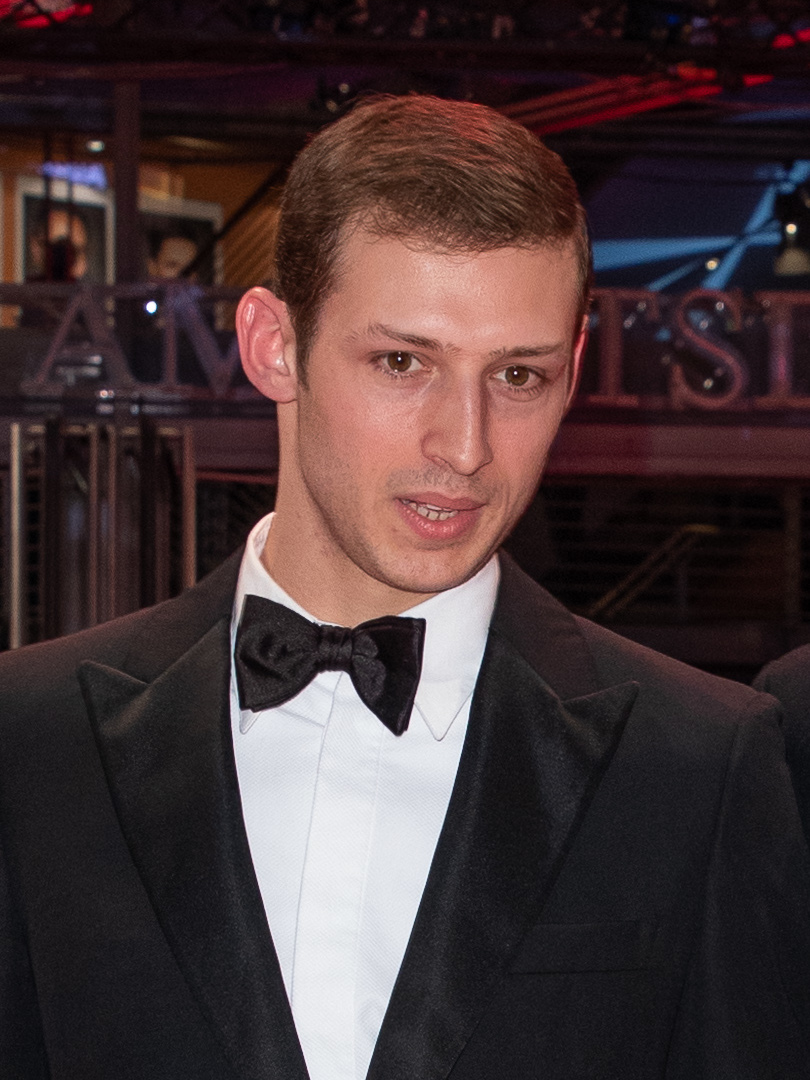
- Tom Mercier at the Berlinale 2019
- Born: November 30, 1993 (age 31); Tel Aviv, Israel
- Citizenship: Israel; France
- Occupations: Actor; comedian
- Years active: 2019–present

Tom Mercier (Hebrew: טום מרסייה; born 30 November 1993) is a French-Israeli actor and comedian.

== Background ==
Mercier was born in Tel Aviv, Israel. He is the son of French-born hairdresser and entrepreneur Michel Mercier and Israeli diamond maker Ronit Silberstein. He was raised in the suburb of Herzliya along Israel's Mediterranean Sea coast.

== Career ==
His acting debut was in Nadav Lapid's drama film Synonyms which won the Golden Bear award at the 69th Berlin International Film Festival in 2019. For his role as Yoav in Synonyms, he was nominated for the Ophir Award and the Lumière Award 2020 as Best Male Revelation.

In 2020, Mercier starred in We Are Who We Are, a limited series directed by Luca Guadagnino, which premiered on HBO.

== Filmography ==
Key
†	Denotes productions that have not yet been released

=== Film ===
Year	Title	Role	Notes
2019	Synonyms	Yoav	
2021	The Star		Short film
2022	My Night	Alex	
2023	The Beast in the Jungle	John	
2023	The Animal Kingdom	Fix	
2024	Darkest Miriam	Janko Prijatelj	

=== Television ===
Year	Title	Role	Notes
2020	We Are Who We Are	Jonathan Kritchevsky	Limited series
2021	The Rope	Joseph	Limited series

== Personal life ==
Mercier has lived in Paris since 2018.
