= We Are Who We Are =

2020 HBO-Sky Atlantic drama television series

- Promotional poster for We Are Who We Are
- Genre: Drama
- Created by: Luca Guadagnino; Paolo Giordano; Francesca Manieri; Sean Conway
- Based on: an original idea by Paolo Giordano
- Written by: Paolo Giordano; Francesca Manieri; Luca Guadagnino
- Directed by: Luca Guadagnino
- Starring: Chloë Sevigny; Jack Dylan Grazer; Alice Braga; Jordan Kristine Seamón; Spence Moore II; Scott Mescudi; Faith Alabi; Francesca Scorsese; Ben Taylor; Corey Knight; Tom Mercier
- Music by: Devonté Hynes
- Countries of origin: Italy; United States
- Original languages: English; Italian
- No. of episodes: 8

Production
- Executive producers: Lorenzo Mieli; Mario Gianani; Luca Guadagnino; Elena Recchia; Sean Conway; Francesco Melzi d'Eril; Nick Hall
- Producer: Ron Bozman
- Cinematography: Fredrik Wenzel; Yorick Le Saux; Massimiliano Kuveiller
- Editor: Marco Costa
- Running time: 49–75 minutes
- Production companies: The Apartment Pictures; Wildside; Small Forward Productions; Sky Studios

Original release
- Network: HBO (United States); Sky Atlantic (Italy)
- Release: September 14 – November 2, 2020

We Are Who We Are is a 2020 coming-of-age drama television miniseries co-created and directed by Luca Guadagnino for HBO and Sky Atlantic. A coming-of-age story set on a fictional U.S. military base in Chioggia, Italy, in 2016, the series follows two American teenagers, Fraser Wilson and Caitlin "Harper" Poythress, as they navigate sexual discovery and burgeoning identity. The cast includes Chloë Sevigny, Jack Dylan Grazer, Alice Braga, Jordan Kristine Seamón, Spence Moore II, and Scott Mescudi.

The series premiered on September 14, 2020, on HBO in the United States and on October 9, 2020, on Sky Atlantic in Italy to critical acclaim.

== Premise ==
We Are Who We Are focuses on two American teenagers who live on a fictional U.S. military base in Chioggia, Italy, in 2016. The series explores themes of found family, first love, self identity, and sexual orientation.

== Cast and characters ==
=== Main ===
- Chloë Sevigny as Sarah Wilson, a colonel in the United States Army and Fraser's mother
- Jack Dylan Grazer as Fraser Wilson, a 14-year-old who moves from New York City to a military base in Chioggia, Italy, with his mothers
- Alice Braga as Maggie Teixeira, a major in the U.S. Army, Fraser's mother and Sarah's wife
- Jordan Kristine Seamón as Caitlin Poythress / Harper, a seemingly bold and confident 14-year-old who is struggling with her gender identity
- Spence Moore II as Danny Poythress, Caitlin's older brother
- Scott Mescudi as Richard Poythress, a lieutenant colonel in the U.S. Army, Caitlin's and Danny's father
- Faith Alabi as Jenny Poythress, Caitlin's and Danny's mother
- Francesca Scorsese as Britney Orton, an outspoken, witty, sexually uninhibited girl
- Ben Taylor as Sam Pratchett, Caitlin's possessive boyfriend, and Craig's younger brother
- Corey Knight as Craig Pratchett, a soldier in his twenties, cheerful and good-natured, who is also Sam’s older brother
- Tom Mercier as Jonathan Kritchevsky, a major who works closely with Sarah

Featured

- Blood Orange as himself

=== Recurring ===
- Beatrice Barichella as Valentina, Craig's nineteen-year-old girlfriend
- Sebastiano Pigazzi as Enrico, a playful eighteen-year-old boy from Veneto, who has a weak spot for Britney
- Vittoria Bottin as Sole, a friend of the group
- Nicole Celpan as Giulia, a girl interested in Harper
- Gene Tramm as Principal Wolf, the principal of the high school that Fraser, Caitlin, and Britney attend
- Maria Teresa Cerantola as Teresa, a bar proprietor who secretly buys fuel from Richard

=== Guests ===
- Hans Bush as Colonel McAunty, the exiting base commander who is replaced by Sarah
- Jim Sweatman as Colonel Martin
- Tomeka Campbell Turley as Mel
- Gaia Schiralli as Monica
- Lisa Lazzaro as Loredana
- Brixhilda Shqalsi as Marta, Jonathan's girlfriend
- Giulia Manzini as Anna
- Jacopo Brigotti as Angelo
- Arturo Gabbriellini as Luca, Fraser’s love interest whom he meets while on their way to the Blood Orange concert in Bologna
- Emma Segat as Futura, a bartender that Harper meets at the Blood Orange concert

== Episodes ==
No.	Title	Directed by	Written by	Original release date	U.S. viewers (millions)
1	"Right Here Right Now I"	Luca Guadagnino	Paolo Giordano & Francesca Manieri & Luca Guadagnino	September 14, 2020	0.117
In 2016, Fraser Wilson and his mothers, Colonel Sarah Wilson and Major Maggie Teixeira, arrive at the Venice Marco Polo Airport in Italy from New York City, where they're greeted and picked up by their Nigerian neighbor, Jenny Poythress. They arrive at their new house, located on the U.S. Army Base "Caserma Maurizio Pialati" near Chioggia, and the family begins to settle in. Fraser explores around the army base and the army base high school, and later haphazardly finds himself dragged along to the beach with a group of his new classmates, led by a girl named Britney. Fraser finds himself fascinated with a girl named Caitlin, who is Jenny's daughter. Fraser spots Caitlin at a restaurant; unexpectedly, she is dressed like a boy and calls herself Harper. Later at the beach, Fraser asks what he should call her.
2	"Right Here Right Now II"	Luca Guadagnino	Paolo Giordano & Francesca Manieri & Luca Guadagnino	September 21, 2020	0.090
The events of the first episode are retold from the perspective of Caitlin, whose family has been at the Italian base for many years. She has a short-tempered older brother, Danny, who is still in school and is currently learning Arabic. Her father Richard, whom she looks up to, is a Trump supporter. Caitlin seems generally uninterested in most things. At the beach, she gets her first period. Her relationship with her boyfriend Sam is strained when she rejects his sexual advances. At a restaurant, she passes for a boy, and Fraser witnesses it. She tells him to stay away from her, but Jenny later tells her that Fraser has left a package for her. Caitlin, initially reluctant to open Fraser's package, curiously opens it and finds a set of more typically masculine clothing. That night, Caitlin sneaks out of her room to goof off with her brother and their friends. The next morning, Caitlin tries on the gifted clothing, and Fraser sees her do so from across his window next door.
3	"Right Here Right Now III"	Luca Guadagnino	Paolo Giordano & Francesca Manieri & Luca Guadagnino	September 28, 2020	0.062
Fraser and Caitlin's relationship has strengthened since the last episode. On Richard's boat, Caitlin makes a mess of some cookies after Fraser informs her that they may contain shellfish. Later, a heartbroken Sam breaks up with Caitlin, who is unfazed. Britney sees Sam's misery and comforts him. It's made clear that ever since she became friends with Fraser, Caitlin's other relationships have become strained. At Fraser's house, the two discuss transgender people and Fraser attempts to teach Caitlin how to shave, but they're interrupted by Sarah. Fraser is angry that the dish he prepared for dinner didn't turn out well, and Caitlin soon witnesses his dysfunctional relationship with Sarah (seemingly resenting his mother's profession). When Caitlin gets back home, Richard angrily tells her to clean up the mess & cookie crumbs she left in the boat. The next day, residents of the base take part in a large parade that happens once a year. Caitlin chooses to walk with Fraser, which angers Danny and causes him to violently lash out at Fraser. Meanwhile, Richard questions his own self-worth after losing the annual game of tug-of-war for the first time. Jenny and Maggie walk together and eat a pie Jenny had baked for her husband.
4	"Right Here Right Now IV"	Luca Guadagnino	Paolo Giordano & Francesca Manieri & Luca Guadagnino	October 5, 2020	0.060
It's the last day before Craig and other soldiers are to be deployed, and Fraser, Caitlin, and her friends play a paintball game in the woods. Sam and Danny ambush Fraser and shoot him with dozens of paintballs, but Britney finds the pair and stops them. Meanwhile, Craig spots Caitlin but lets her go with the flag. On the way back, Valentina is visibly upset that Craig will be away for two years, so he asks her to marry him there and then, and she wearily accepts. After the group helps pick out impromptu wedding outfits, the couple is wed in a small ceremony. The group celebrates by breaking into a villa whose affluent Russian owners are away. The group swims in the villa's pool and parties inside, helping themselves to the Russians' stock of food and alcohol. The group drinks heavily, notably Danny too, who describes himself as an abstainer from alcohol but drunkenly has sex with one of Valentina's friends on the couch. Caitlin asks Craig why he didn't shoot her during the paintball game, but he denies having had an open shot. Eventually, Craig and Valentina consummate their marriage in one of the villa's bedrooms while an inebriated Sam confronts Fraser in the bathroom. Fraser shrugs it off and leaves, but he's cornered and kissed by Sole outside the bathroom. He tells Caitlin, and she seems unfazed but tells him not to do it again. Then, make a pact they'll never share a kiss. The next morning, Craig sneaks out back to the base to be deployed.
5	"Right Here Right Now V"	Luca Guadagnino	Paolo Giordano & Francesca Manieri & Luca Guadagnino	October 12, 2020	0.049
Caitlin gets up early to go to the digital shooting range, assisted by Sarah, who commends her accuracy. Maggie and Jenny are revealed to be sleeping together. When Fraser arrives at school, he spots a note posted on the board in the hallway referring to "Harper," signed by Giulia, the girl who Caitlin spoke to at the restaurant in Episode 1. He gives it to Caitlin, who wants to meet Giulia again. With Fraser's help, Caitlin applies trimmed hair onto her face while Fraser orders Blood Orange concert tickets, then the pair shave Caitlin's head. They ride to the meeting spot, where Fraser leaves Caitlin to hang out with Giulia and her friends. Fraser wanders off and stumbles upon the movie theater, buying a ticket for Ouija: Origin of Evil. At the theater, he sees Jonathan, a major in Sarah's command whom he is infatuated with. Jonathan invites him to sit with him, and the two walk home after the movie, striking up a friendship. Meanwhile, Richard notices Caitlin's shaven hair in the bathroom. Furious, he later confronts Caitlin (blaming Fraser and his lesbian parentage), who breaks down in her father's arms.
6	"Right Here Right Now VI"	Luca Guadagnino	Paolo Giordano & Francesca Manieri & Luca Guadagnino	October 19, 2020	0.050
In light of the shaving incident, Richard grounds Caitlin and forces her to spend the weekend on a hunting trip. Fraser goes to the post office and picks up a book, then leaves it on Jonathan's desk with a note. Caitlin spends the beginning of the hunting trip sneaking away to find a cellular signal to text Fraser, but she eventually returns to her father. While eating dinner by the campfire, Richard questions Caitlin about what she sees in Fraser (believing him gay), and she tells him that Fraser understands her. The next morning, Fraser wakes to a voicemail from Jonathan inviting him out, and Fraser is enthused. Sarah sees it as an exciting opportunity for Fraser to have a male role model in his life. Jonathan drives Fraser out to the countryside and they walk together to a picturesque war monument. Later at a restaurant, Fraser is shocked to see that Jonathan invited his friend Marta, but eventually adjusts, and the three sing karaoke together. The next day, Caitlin returns from the trip, and Sarah spots her in the food court. She calls her over and questions her about her gender identity, offering to take her to an endocrinologist. Caitlin is happy and later watches videos of testosterone injections online. That night, Donald Trump is elected President of the United States. Sarah, while watching the news, gets a call from an unknown number. After she picks up, a look of sadness washes over her. She asks "Where?" and "How many?" and quickly leaves the house.
7	"Right Here Right Now VII"	Luca Guadagnino	Paolo Giordano & Francesca Manieri & Luca Guadagnino	October 26, 2020	0.092
Sarah arrives at the army headquarters. It is revealed that there was an IED explosion in Afghanistan where the troops were recently deployed. Three men were killed in the blast, including Craig. At school, Caitlin tells Fraser that Sam has been trying to call her all morning. Soldiers enter the classroom and quietly inform the teacher of the explosion. The students are called down to the gymnasium, where the principal announces the incident. Britney arrives in tears, and Caitlin checks her texts, breaking down in tears. While preparing for the memorial, Jenny and Maggie argue over the recent events, and Maggie ends their affair. At the memorial, an inebriated Richard lashes out at Sarah, blaming her for the deaths of Craig, Drew, and Alvaro. Danny becomes angry, reckless, and destructive in response to Craig's death. The group returns to the villa from Craig and Valentina's post-wedding celebration, gets high, then wreaks havoc. Caitlin comforts Danny after he hallucinates Craig's death during a bad trip. Fraser, who was exiled by the group (due to his mother's orders blamed for incident), walks to Jonathan's apartment; Marta is there and she invites him in, they comfort him, offer alcohol and weed, they dance and hug but Fraser leaves as things turn disconcertingly sensual. He sobs in the rain on his way out, gets drunk at home and passes out on the floor. As his mothers check on him, he begs details about his father. Fraser gets a call for help from Caitlin, and he, driven by Sarah and Maggie, picks her and Danny up from the villa and takes them home. That night, Sarah confronts Maggie about her affair with Jenny, and Maggie says that Richard and his family pose a risk, convincing Sarah to assign them to another base. Fraser and Caitlin fall asleep over a video call, and Danny prays in the garage.
8	"Right Here Right Now VIII and Last"	Luca Guadagnino	Paolo Giordano & Francesca Manieri & Luca Guadagnino	November 2, 2020 (Note: The series finale aired for the first time on October 30, 2020, on Sky Atlantic in Italy.)	0.058
Caitlin and her family pack to move to Chicago as Richard has been reassigned. Britney visits Caitlin and finally admits she has always been in love with her and the two share a kiss. Fraser texts Caitlin that the Blood Orange concert is imminent and the two run away to Bologna to see the show. They eventually hitch a ride with other fans and Fraser meets a boy named Luca who also loves fashion and says he has a girlfriend. Caitlin gets separated from the boys as they enter the venue and meets Futura, a female bartender who flirts and gives her a backstage pass; Caitlin meets Blood Orange and texts their selfie picture to Fraser. Caitlin kisses Futura who asks her if she is transgender. As Blood Orange does an encore, Caitlin texts Fraser she is leaving to catch the train home. Fraser asks her to wait but she leaves. Luca takes Fraser on a tour of the arches in Bologna and they share a kiss. Fraser has an epiphany and leaves Luca, who fades into thin air. Fraser rushes to the train station and pulls Caitlin from the train home. He takes her to the arches and they break their earlier pact by finally sharing a long, romantic kiss as morning dawns into sunrise.

== Production ==
=== Development ===
In February 2019, it was announced that Luca Guadagnino was in talks with HBO to work on a new one-hour, eight-episode show tentatively titled We Are Who We Are. Guadagnino would direct the series and write the script with Paolo Giordano and Francesca Manieri. Lorenzo Mieli and Riccardo Neri were named as prospective executive producers.

The US Department of Defense was initially supportive, and the show was to be filmed at the US army complex at Vicenza, which would also provide the extras. Guadagnino later commented that they must not have read the script; the Department of Defense later withdrew all offers of support and, according to Guadagnino, would have preferred the show not to happen. Ultimately HBO had a set built nearby to represent the base.

The set was recreated in an ex Italian Air Force base that served as the logistics area of a Nike Hercules missiles site in Bagnoli di Sopra (PD), the "Gruppo I.T.".

The first reports described the main characters, Fraser Wilson and Caitlin Harper, as "a detached teenager who hails from New York City" and "a character [that] is hard to describe—beautiful, sometimes disapproving, poetic," respectively.

=== Casting ===
On July 17, 2019, the cast was revealed by HBO and it includes Chloë Sevigny, Scott Mescudi, Alice Braga, Jack Dylan Grazer, Spence Moore II, and newcomers Jordan Kristine Seamón, Faith Alabi, Corey Knight, Tom Mercier, Francesca Scorsese, Ben Taylor and Sebastiano Pigazzi.

=== Filming ===
Principal photography on the series was expected to begin in Italy in late May 2019, with production set to run through October, but production began in late July.

== Release and reception ==
The series premiered in its entirety at the 68th San Sebastián International Film Festival on September 20, 2020.

The series premiered on television on September 14, 2020, on HBO in the United States and on October 9, 2020, on Sky Atlantic in Italy. The finale aired in Italy on October 30, 2020, ahead of its broadcast on HBO. In the United Kingdom, the limited series was released in its entirety on November 22, 2020, by BBC Three via iPlayer.

=== Critical response ===
The series received critical acclaim, and is often cited as one of Guadagnino’s career-defining works. On review aggregator Rotten Tomatoes, the series holds an approval rating of 90% based on 41 reviews, with an average rating of 8.4/10. The website's critics consensus reads, "We Are Who We Are moves mountains, and by focusing on the little details and allowing its central teens to just be, Luca Guadagnino creates small-screen poetry." Metacritic assigned the series a weighted average score of 77 out of 100 based on 22 reviews, indicating "generally favorable reviews".

Alexandra Pollard of The Independent gave the series five stars out of five and stated, "Nothing is black and white in Luca Guadagnino’s potent, poetic coming-of-age series We Are Who We Are. Gender identity, sexuality, politics, morality – all are in constant flux, shifting like the tides of the coastal Italian town where this group of teenagers are living, on a US army base, in the run-up to Donald Trump’s presidential election win." Darren Franich of Entertainment Weekly gave the series a B+ and said, "We Are Who We Are is mostly vibes, but what vibes!" Writing for Rolling Stone, Alan Sepinwall gave a rating of 4/5 and wrote "Few transplants from the big screen to the small have as keen an eye, or ear, as Guadagnino, so the voyeuristic nature of the storytelling feels inviting rather than indulgent." Caroline Framke of Variety described the series as "so visceral as to become unsettling—but what else is being a teenager like, if not immersive, visceral and unsettling?". On a less positive side, Matt Roush from TV Guide opined that the series "wants to be shocking like Euphoria, but soon grows monotonous."

=== U.S. Ratings ===
Viewership and ratings per episode of We Are Who We Are
No.	Title	Air date	Rating (18–49)	Viewers (millions)
1	"Right Here Right Now I"	September 14, 2020	0.02	0.117
2	"Right Here Right Now II"	September 21, 2020	0.01	0.090
3	"Right Here Right Now III"	September 28, 2020	0.01	0.062
4	"Right Here Right Now IV"	October 5, 2020	0.01	0.060
5	"Right Here Right Now V"	October 12, 2020	0.01	0.049
6	"Right Here Right Now VI"	October 19, 2020	0.01	0.050
7	"Right Here Right Now VII"	October 26, 2020	0.03	0.092
8	"Right Here Right Now VIII and Last"	November 2, 2020	0.01	0.058
