= Marius Olteanu =

Romanian film director, screenwriter, and photographer

- Born: 1979 (age 46–47); Bucharest, Romania
- Education: I. L. Caragiale National University of Theatre and Film; National Film and Television School
- Occupations: Film director, screenwriter, photographer
- Years active: 2007–present

Marius Olteanu (born 1979) is a Romanian film director, screenwriter, and photographer. He is best known for writing and directing his debut feature-length drama film, Monsters. (2019).

== Early life and education ==
Olteanu was born in Bucharest, Romania. He completed undergraduate film directing studies at the I. L. Caragiale National University of Theatre and Film (UNATC) in Bucharest. He later moved to the United Kingdom for graduate studies, earning a Master of Arts degree in Film Directing from the National Film and Television School (NFTS).

== Career ==
Olteanu spent his early career directing independent short narrative films. His short film credits include Sunday Afternoon (2007), Reality Won't Bite (2008), Why Don't You Dance? (2008), Tie (2015), and No Man's Land (2017). His 2015 short production Tie (Romanian: Scor alb) won the Transilvania Pitch Stop Development Award during its development phase.

In 2019, Olteanu completed his feature directorial debut with Monsters. (Romanian: Monștri.). The film made its world premiere in the Forum section of the 69th Berlin International Film Festival, where it received the Tagesspiegel Readers' Jury Award. Following its premiere, the film achieved international festival distribution and received critical analysis from trade publications like The Hollywood Reporter. Domestically, the feature secured nine nominations at Romania's national Gopo Awards, including category nods for Olteanu across Best Feature Film and Best Director.

In June 2026, it was reported that Olteanu was in production on his second feature film, a pandemic-era drama titled We Won't Get Old Together.

== Filmography ==
- Sunday Afternoon (2007) – Short film
- Reality Won't Bite (2008) – Short film
- Why Don't You Dance? (2008) – Short film
- Tie (2015) – Short film
- No Man's Land (2017) – Short film
- Monsters. (2019) – Feature film
- We Won't Get Old Together (2026) - Feature Film

== Accolades ==
Year	Award / Festival	Category	Work	Result
2019	69th Berlin International Film Festival	Tagesspiegel Readers' Jury Award	Monsters.	Won
2019	Sofia International Film Festival	Grand Prix 'Sofia City of Film'	Monsters.	Won
2019	International Film Festival of India	Centenary Award for Best Debut Feature Film	Monsters.	Won
2019	Transilvania International Film Festival	Romanian Days Award for Best Debut Feature	Monsters.	Won
2020	Gopo Awards	Best Feature Film	Monsters.	Nominated
2020	Gopo Awards	Best Director	Marius Olteanu	Nominated
