= Lemebel =

- Directed by: Joanna Reposi Garibaldi
- Written by: Joanna Reposi Garibaldi; Manuel Maira
- Produced by: Paula Sáenz-Laguna
- Starring: Pedro Lemebel
- Cinematography: Niles Atallah
- Edited by: Titi Viera-Gallo Chadwick
- Music by: Camilo Salinas
- Production company: Solita Producciones
- Release date: February 8, 2019 (Berlinale)
- Running time: 96 minutes
- Country: Chile
- Language: Spanish

Lemebel is a Chilean documentary film, directed by Joanna Reposi Garibaldi and released in 2019. The film is a portrait of Pedro Lemebel, an influential Chilean poet. It focuses on his artistic activity that started during the military dictatorship, his memories of his mother, and his battle against cancer, which ultimately led to his death in 2015.

The film had its theatrical premiere in February 2019 at the 69th Berlin International Film Festival, where it won the Teddy Award for best LGBTQ-related documentary film.
