= Monsters. =

2019 Romanian drama film

- Film poster
- Romanian: Monștri.
- Directed by: Marius Olteanu
- Written by: Marius Olteanu
- Produced by: Robert Fita; Claudiu Mitcu; Ion Ioachim Stroe
- Starring: Judith State; Cristian Popa; Alexandru Potocean; Șerban Pavlu; Dorina Lazăr
- Cinematography: Luchian Ciobanu
- Edited by: Ion Ioachim Stroe
- Production company: Parada Film
- Distributed by: Norte Distribution; Arti Film
- Release date: February 9, 2019 (Berlin)
- Running time: 116 minutes
- Country: Romania
- Language: Romanian

Monsters. (Romanian: Monștri.) is a 2019 Romanian drama film directed and written by Marius Olteanu. It stars Judith State, Cristian Popa, Alexandru Potrocean, Șerban Pavlu and Dorina Lazăr. The plot is divided in three chapters and follows a day in the life of Dana (State) and Arthur (Popa), a childless married couple, who tries to understand their ongoing marital crisis.

The film is the directorial debut of Olteanu. It premiered on February 9, 2019 at the 69th Berlin International Film Festival. It received generally positive reviews from film critics.

== Cast ==
- Judith State as Dana
- Cristian Popa as Arthur
- Alexandru Potocean as Taxi Driver
- Serban Pavlu as Alex
- Dorina Lazar as Mamaie
- Gabriel Rauta as Popescu
- Alina Berzunteanu as Anca Popescu
- Alina Tarba as Alina
- Rolando Matsangos as Alina's Husband
