= Love Trilogy: Reborn =

2019 film by Yaron Shani

- טרילוגיה על אהבה: לידה
- Directed by: Yaron Shani
- Written by: Yaron Shani
- Produced by: Naomi Levari; Saar Yogev; Michael Reuter
- Starring: Stav Almagor; Ori Shani; Leah Tonic
- Cinematography: Nitzan Lotem, Shai Skeef
- Edited by: Yaron Shani
- Music by: Hanan Ben Ari
- Production company: Black Sheep Film Productions
- Distributed by: Alpha Violet
- Release date: October 4, 2019
- Running time: 108 minutes
- Countries: Israel, Germany
- Language: Hebrew

Love Trilogy: Reborn (in Hebrew: טרילוגיה על אהבה: לידה) is a 2019 Israeli drama film, and the third installation of the Love Trilogy film series, following the second of the trilogy, Chained (2019). Reborn was written, directed, and edited by Yaron Shani. The film's world premier took place at the Busan Film Festival. It then won Best Film, Best Actress (shared between the three leads), and Best Cinematography awards at the Haifa International Film Festival.

== Plot summary ==
Avigail (Stav Almagor) is undergoing fertility treatments, and stands helplessly between her husband's bullying and her daughter's rebelliousness. She meets two sisters who share a complex relationship: Yael (Ori Shani) accompanies women through pregnancy and performs as a doula in childbirth, while her own trauma caused by her mother's abandonment prevents her from becoming a mother; and Na'ama (Leah Tonic), already traumatized by her stepfather's abuse in her childhood, who loses control of her life when she becomes his caretaker when he's placed in a nursing home due to dementia. The women find solace and meaning in their connections, and discover that they can help each other change, break their figurative chains, and be reborn.

== Characters ==
Yaron Shani works with a cast of non-actors, who work without a script, improvising the scenes on-camera. The film is shot in single takes, without rehearsals.

- Avigail Malka (Stav Almagor): Works to be a perfect nurse, mother to Yasmine, and wife to Rashi, a police officer who is desperate for a child of his own. While appearing happy to self-sacrifice on the outside, Avigail actually internalizes her anger in punitive ways. On the verge of a breakdown, she finds comfort and guidance from Yael, a childbirth counselor.
- Yael Efrati (Ori Shani): Having been abandoned by her parents, Yael makes it her life mission to accompany other women in their journey to motherhood. But Yael herself can't find her way on that path, and is, instead, ruled by her fears of becoming a mother. Though considered a kind of spiritual guru to expectant mothers, Yael finds herself unable to provide care for her own sister, Na'ama.
- Na'ama Efrati (Leah Tonic): Na'ama is also juggling life crises – she's dealing with mental health issues, while also caring for her abusive stepfather who is in a care home due to severe dementia. At night, Na'ama acts out in degrading ways as a sex worker.
- Alice Turgeman (Laliv Sivan): An author whose first book achieved great success, making her a rising star in the Israeli literary scene. She has experienced a mental health crisis following tormenting visions of rape.
- Rashi Malka (Eran Naim): A cop whose life is spiraling out of control, as he deals with critical issues both at work and in his marriage.
- Yasmine (Stav Patay): Avigail's daughter from a previous relationship. She acts out, refusing to accept her new family situation, turning the home into a war zone.

== Production ==
The film is an Israel-German co-production produced by Naomi Levari and Saar Yogev of Black Sheep Film Productions, in cooperation with Michael Reuter of The Post Republic. The movie was made with the support of the Israeli Film Fund, Arte, and yes satellite television, and is distributed by Alpha Violet, a French-based independent film distribution company.

== Reviews ==
Israeli news site ynet praises Shani's project, calling it "intriguing" and "meant to blend the line between reality and fiction". In her Haaretz review, Nurit Enderman comments on how, though each of the films in the trilogy being able to stand on its own, the third installation exposes the trilogy's "fascinating complexity.... Revealing the obvious and hidden connections that link them". She predicted that Reborn might well take the Best Picture award at the Jerusalem Film Festival, writing that "It certainly deserves it—both as an independent work and as part of one of the most interesting, ambitious, original, and complex cinematic projects ever created." Writing for Srita, an Israeli online cinema magazine, Ofer Libergal also calls the film project "one of the most ambitious in the history of Israeli cinema". He positively remarks that while the first two films in the series focused heavily on the exploitative and violent sides of love, with a primary lens upon the male characters, Reborn deals with connection and empathy between women. This, he contends, "justifies the choice of the word 'love' to describe the trilogy".

== Awards ==
| Year | Award | Category | Nominee | Result | Ref |
|---|---|---|---|---|---|
| 2019 | Haifa International Film Festival | Best Film | Naomi Levari (producer) Saar Yogev (producer) Yaron Shani (director) | Won | |
| 2019 | Haifa International Film Festival | Best Actress | Stav Almagor Ori Shani Leah Tonic | Won | |
| 2019 | Haifa International Film Festival | Best Cinematography | Nizan Lotem Shai Skiff | Won | |
| 2019 | Haifa International Film Festival | Best Script | Yaron Shani | Nominated | |
| 2019 | Haifa International Film Festival | Best Editing | Yaron Shani | Nominated | |
| 2020 | Shanghai International Film Festival Belt and Road Film Week | Audience Choice Award | Yaron Shani | Nominated | |

== See also ==
- Love Trilogy: Stripped
- Love Trilogy: Chained
