= Love Trilogy: Stripped =

2018 film by Yaron Shani

- עירום
- Directed by: Yaron Shani
- Written by: Yaron Shani
- Produced by: Naomi Levari; Saar Yogev
- Starring: Laliv Sivan; Bar Gottfried
- Cinematography: Nitzan Lotem; Shai Skiff
- Music by: Bar Gottfried
- Production company: Black Sheep Productions
- Distributed by: Alpha Violet
- Release date: August 30, 2018
- Running time: 120 minutes
- Country: Israel
- Language: Hebrew

Stripped is a 2018 Israeli drama film, the first in the Love Trilogy, written and directed by Yaron Shani. The film premiered at the Venice Film Festival. The second and third parts of the trilogy, Chained and Reborn, respectively, came out in January 2019.

== Plot summary ==
Alice Turgeman (Laliv Sivan) is a writer whose first book was a huge success. She is a rising star in Israel's literary world, but she experiences a mental breakdown because of unceasing visions of being raped and abused. Ziv Zuckerman (Bar Gottfried) is an introverted high-school student who plays classical guitar, and is trying to achieve musician status for his compulsory military service. The encounter between the two illustrates how crises can catalyze destruction as well as growth, violence as well as grace.

== Cast of characters ==
Shani works with non-actors, who receive no script but rather improvise the scenes on camera. Shooting was done in single takes, without rehearsals.

Name	Character	About
Laliv Sivan	Alice Turgeman	Successful author, experiences a mental breakdown
Bar Gottfried	Ziv Zuckerman	High schooler, classical guitarist
Or Rosen		High schooler, Ziv's classmate
Michael Uriha	Johnny	Alice's partner

== Production ==
The film is a German-Israeli co-production, produced by Naomi Levari and Saar Yogev of Black Sheep Productions, in collaboration with Michael Rotter of The Post Republic Company. The film was supported by the Israel Film Fund, ARTE, and Yes television. It is distributed by Alpha Violet, and independent film distributor based in France.

== Awards ==
Year	Award	Category	Nominee(s)	Result	Notes
2018	Venice Film Festival	"Horizons"	Stripped	Nominated	
2018	Ophir Award	Best Director	Yaron Shani	Nominated	
2018	Ophir Award	Best Actress	Laliv Sivan	Nominated	
2018	Ophir Award	Best Casting	Maya Cassel	Nominated	
2018	Ophir Award	Best Soundtrack	Aviv Aldema, Nir Alon	Nominated	
2018	Haifa International Film Festival	Best Editing (Feature)	Yaron Shani	Won	
2018	Haifa International Film Festival	Best Actress (Feature)	Laliv Sivan	Won	

== See also ==
- Love Trilogy: Chained
- Love Trilogy: Reborn
