= Facing the Wall =

Short Israeli film

- עם הפנים לקיר
- Directed by: Aalam-Warqe Davidian
- Screenplay by: Aalam-Warqe Davidian
- Produced by: Naomi Levari, Saar Yogev
- Starring: Sapir Sinka; Tehilla Yashayauh; Shula Mola
- Cinematography: Daniel Miller
- Edited by: Margarita Balaklav
- Production company: Black Sheep Productions
- Release date: June 13, 2016

Facing the Wall (in Hebrew: עם הפנים לקיר) is a 2016 Israeli short film, written and directed by Aalam-Warqe Davidian. The film won the best picture award at the International Student Film Festival and the Van Lir best short film award at the 2016 Jerusalem Film Festival.

== Plot summary ==
The film follows Surni, a 14 year old Ethiopian girl who is newly arrived in Israel. Surni wakes up to her first day in an immigrant absorption center, without the boy she loves. She shuts herself in her room, refusing to open her eyes or get out of bed. Her mother, who is also missing home, tries to help her find a way for the both of them to say goodbye to the world they left behind.

== Cast of characters ==
Actor	Character	Ref.
Sapir Sinka	Surni	
Tehilla Yashayauh	Mulo	
Shula Mola	Avrash	
Limor Groberman	Avigail	
Ayala Yatamr	Ethiopian Guide	

== Awards and festivals ==
- 2016 - Ophir awards - best short film (nominated)
- 2016 - International Student Film Festival, best independent short film
- 2016 - Jerusalem Film Festival, Van Lir award, best short film
- 2017 - Festival de Cine Africano, best short film award
- 2017 - Toronto International Film Festival
- 2017 - Toronto Jewish Film Festival
- 2017 - Festival Olhares do Mediterrâneo
- 2017 - Rhode Island Flickers International Film Festival
- 2018 - Hearland Festival
- 2018 - San Diego Jewish Film Festival
