= Marrakech International Film Festival Foundation =

Marrakech International Film Festival Foundation was established in 2001 by Prince Moulay Rachid, who acts as president. The Foundation is a not-for-profit organization and was incorporated due to lack of opportunities for creative talents in cinematography. The Foundation is distinguished as the host of the annual Marrakech International Film Festival in Marrakech, Morocco.

The purview of MIFF Foundation is very broad. The Foundation brings together emerging film talents from diverse Moroccan, African, Arab, and International communities to network, dialogue, share, support and critique each other's work. For that reason, the Foundation has focused its activities to facilitate a forum where filmmakers and other film artists can interact and pitch their ideas to producers and investors. The Foundation is a main sponsor, along with the European Union, of the annual workshop of MEDA Films Development in Marrakesh, which offers the opportunity to scriptwriter and producer teams to learn new ways of creating innovative ideas, expanding on them and collaborating to realize them as feature films.

In 2005, the Foundation joined forces with the Tribeca Film Institute to create a pioneering filmmaking exchange program. The Marrakech/Tribeca Filmmaker Exchange was held in Marrakech in conjunction with film festival. The Exchange brought together eight New York film students and eight emerging Moroccan directors. Film directors Martin Scorsese and Iran's Abbas Kiarostami have offered master classes in the program, which were among the program's core offerings.
