= Buoyancy (film) =

2019 Australian drama film

- Theatrical release poster
- Directed by: Rodd Rathjen
- Written by: Rodd Rathjen
- Produced by: Kristina Ceyton; Samantha Jennings; Rita Walsh
- Starring: Sarm Heng
- Cinematography: Michael Latham
- Edited by: Graeme Pereira
- Music by: Lawrence English
- Production company: Causeway Films
- Distributed by: Umbrella Entertainment
- Release date: 8 February 2019 (Berlin)
- Running time: 93 minutes
- Country: Australia
- Languages: Khmer; Thai; Isan

Buoyancy is a 2019 Australian drama film directed by Rodd Rathjen. It was selected as the Australian entry for the Best International Feature Film at the 92nd Academy Awards, but it was not nominated.

== Plot ==
Inspired by actual events, a 14-year-old Cambodian boy becomes a victim of human trafficking when he is enslaved on a Thai fishing trawler.

== Cast ==
- Sarm Heng as Chakra
- Thanawut Kasro as Rom Ran (first trafficker)
- Mony Ros as Kea
- Saicheer Wongwirot as Kadir (second trafficker)

== Release ==
The film's premiere took place at the 2019 Berlin International Film Festival.

Critic Paul O'Callaghan assessed the film as a "terse minimalist thriller" about slavery in southeast Asia. Screen Daily's Sarah Ward credited Heng with "a captivating lead" with "a rawness to his performance".

== Reception ==
=== Critical response ===
Buoyancy has an approval rating of 97% on review aggregator website Rotten Tomatoes, based on 35 reviews, and an average rating of 7.9/10. The website's critical consensus states: "Grueling but powerful, Buoyancy finds grim urgency in its portrayal of a young man's horrific captivity and fight for human dignity". Metacritic assigned the film a weighted average score of 77 out of 100, based on 8 critics, indicating "generally favorable reviews".

=== Awards and nominations ===
Award	Date of ceremony	Category	Recipients	Result	Ref.
Berlin International Film Festival	17 February 2019	Prize of the Ecumenical Jury – Panorama	Buoyancy	Won	
Berlin International Film Festival	17 February 2019	Amnesty International Film Prize	Buoyancy	Nominated	
Berlin International Film Festival	17 February 2019	Best First Feature	Buoyancy	Nominated	
Berlin International Film Festival	17 February 2019	Panorama Audience Award	Buoyancy	Third place	
Melbourne International Film Festival	18 August 2019	People's Choice Award for Best Feature	Buoyancy	Fifth place	
Asia Pacific Screen Awards	21 November 2019	Best Youth Feature Film	Buoyancy	Won	
AACTA Awards	4 December 2019	Best Indie Film	Buoyancy	Won	

== See also ==
- List of submissions to the 92nd Academy Awards for Best International Feature Film
- List of Australian submissions for the Academy Award for Best International Feature Film
