= Synonyms (film) =

2019 film by Nadav Lapid

- Film poster
- Directed by: Nadav Lapid
- Written by: Nadav Lapid; Haim Lapid
- Produced by: Saïd Ben Saïd; Michel Merkt
- Starring: Tom Mercier; Quentin Dolmaire; Louise Chevillotte
- Cinematography: Shai Goldman
- Edited by: Neta Braun; Era Lapid; François Gédigier
- Production companies: SBS Productions; Joana Henning (Estúdio Escarlate); Pie Films; Komplizen Film; Arte France Cinéma; Israel Cinema Project; Rabinovich Foundation; The Israel Film Council; CNC; German Federal Film Board; Institut Français
- Distributed by: SBS Distribution; Grand Film; Estúdio Escarlate
- Release dates: 13 February 2019 (Berlin); 28 February 2019 (Israel); 27 March 2019 (France); 5 September 2019 (Germany)
- Running time: 123 minutes
- Countries: France; Israel; Germany
- Languages: French; Hebrew
- Box office: $615,592

Synonyms (French: Synonymes) is a 2019 international co-produced satirical drama film directed by Nadav Lapid, from a screenplay by Lapid and Haim Lapid. It stars Tom Mercier, Quentin Dolmaire and Louise Chevillotte.

The film had its world premiere at the 69th Berlin International Film Festival on 13 February 2019, where it won the Golden Bear. It was theatrically released in France on 27 March 2019, by SBS Distribution, in Germany on 5 September 2019, by Grand Film, and in Israel on 28 February 2019. The film received positive reviews from critics.

== Plot ==
Yoav, a young Israeli man absconds to Paris with the intention of distancing himself from his Israeli identity. Shortly after moving into an empty apartment, his belongings are stolen while he is bathing, leaving him without clothes or money. Completely naked, he knocks on the doors of the other apartments asking for help. Two young neighbors, Émile and Caroline, enter the apartment and find him unconscious in the bathtub. They assist him and provide clothing and some money. Émile, who is the son of a wealthy industrialist, feels immediately drawn to him. His flatmate and girlfriend, Caroline, studies oboe at the conservatory. Yoav focuses on learning and using French, memorizing words and their meanings using a small dictionary. He begins murmuring French synonyms to himself in the street.

Yoav moves out and rents a small, run-down one-room flat, living in precarious conditions. He remains in contact with the couple and learns that Émile is writing a novel. Yoav's past in Israel is intermittently referenced through conversations and encounters. In his new job as a security guard at the Israeli embassy, his anti-Israeli stance and refusal to speak Hebrew make him unpopular. His colleague Yaron sees Europe as a hotbed of antisemitism, with France at its center. He has a habit of confronting passersby in the street or on the metro with his Jewish heritage in order to provoke antisemitic reactions. However, Yoav’s friendship with him does not last long. Yoav loses his job when he lets the waiting crowd into the embassy's premises without checking their identities while chanting loudly “Open borders!”.

When Yoav’s father arrives in Paris, Yoav refuses to meet him and sends Émile in his place. However, his father manages to contact him. Yoav refuses to speak to him in Hebrew and asks him to leave in English. Émile increasingly views his own life as “banal” compared to Yoav’s. As a result, Yoav “gives” the story of his life to his friend. Yoav also begins an affair with Caroline and, at Émile’s urging, marries her in order to obtain a French passport more easily. To do so, however, he must attend an integration course.

To earn some money, Yoav advertises his services as a model. Unknowingly, he comes into contact with a pornography producer. When he is pressured to insert his finger into his anus in front of the camera and to speak his mother tongue, he becomes nervous and switches back to Hebrew for the first time. He flees a later porn shoot with a Lebanese woman when he is forced to wear a soldier’s uniform. His co-star then refuses to have sex with him on camera. Yoav runs away to see Émile, to whom he soon asks to retract his stories. Émile agrees. However, Yoav soon senses that Émile is growing tired of his friendship. A quarrel with Caroline occurs when Yoav criticizes a performance with her orchestra, becoming enraged, and nearly getting into a fight with a musician. After some months, he decides to leave Paris and return to Israel. When he tries to say goodbye to Émile, he finds the door to his apartment locked. Yoav attempts to force it open.

== Cast ==
- Tom Mercier as Yoav
- Quentin Dolmaire as Emile
- Louise Chevillotte as Caroline
- Uria Hayik as Yaron
- Olivier Loustau as Michel
- Léa Drucker as French Teacher

== Release ==
The film had its world premiere at the Berlin International Film Festival on 13 February 2019. The film was released in Israel on 28 February 2019. It was released in France on 27 March 2019, by SBS Distribution. In May 2019, Kino Lorber acquired U.S. distribution rights to the film. It was released in Germany on 5 September 2019, by Grand Film.

The film also screened at the Toronto International Film Festival on 9 September 2019. and the New York Film Festival on 29 September 2019. It was released in the United States on 25 October 2019.

== Critical reception ==
Synonyms received positive reviews from film critics. It holds an 88% approval rating on review aggregator website Rotten Tomatoes, based on 90 reviews, with an average of 7.3/10. The site's critical consensus reads, "Synonyms latches onto third-rail issues with thrilling audacity -- and taps into an energy that proves as discomfiting as it is infectious." On Metacritic, the film holds a rating of 84 out of 100, based on 21 critics, indicating "universal acclaim".
