= Bufis =

Somali-Kenyan criminal drama

Bufis (title translated as "Daydreamers") is a 2023 Kenyan-Somali criminal drama film inspired by true life events, directed by Vincenzo Cavallo and Mahad Ahmed. It won the VFF Talent Highlight Award at The 69th annual Berlin International Film Festival that took place from 7 to 17 February 2019. It was written by Vincenzo Cavallo (under the artistic name Dr. Faras) and produced by Cultural Video Production and unafilm, starring Ilmi Ahmed, Zeitun Salat and Ali Buul.

== Plot ==
Bufis is based on true events happening at the end of the 90s and the beginning of the 2000s, covering a scam that involved thousands of Somalis who managed to obtain a green card visa for the USA. The title of the film refers to people who are constantly dreaming of going abroad, in that they are told to have "Bufis'' or to be "Bufis" (to be daydreamers).

When the American embassy opens the green card lottery visa, the mysterious broker Assad, a sort of contemporary Robin Hood, uses this opportunity to spin hundreds of whimsical tales about imaginary families running away from the war and submits them; many of these stories are inspired by his own personal life. Through the elaborate scheme he creates fake families and trains them in order to scam the system and secure for them a better life overseas. Despite his questionable modus operandi, he successfully relocates hundreds of Somalis to the US.

When one of his stories is selected for the next step, Kamal, a repatriated Somali-American, helps him to find the right characters for the embassy interviews, he acts as a casting director. Their plans take an unexpected turn when their con is about to be discovered and they are forced to choose between their own self-interests and the ones of the people they want to protect.

== International release ==
Bufis premiered in Poland on 6 October 2023 at the 39th edition of the Warsaw Film Festival (WIFF), where it was nominated for the Free Spirit Award. In February 2024, Bufis was released on Netflix with the name Daydreamers and in April premiered in North America at the 43rd edition of the Minneapolis Saint Paul International Film Festival, followed by the 31st edition of the New York African Film in May where Bufis was screened as a closing film in Harlem at the African Center. In June it premiered at The 9th Edition Of The African Film Festival (TAFF) in Dallas Texas. On August 15th, it was featured in the 18th edition of the Africa Cinema Festival in Lausanne Switzerland. It was also screened at The annual film festival ‘AFRIKAMERA – Latest Cinema from Africa’ in November.

== Distribution ==
The film is distributed by Rushlake Media and premiered in Poland in October 2023. In November the film was released in Kenyan theatres with a sold-out premiere organized at the Westgate Cinema. The closing screening was organized at the independent cinema Unseen in Nairobi, where the film sold out all the shows.

== Directors ==
Vincenzo Cavallo and Mahad Ahmed had worked together previously; before Bufis they worked on WAZI?FM, a feature film that won the Golden Dhow at ZIFF in 2015, and Almost Somali, a documentary co-produced with ARTE in 2022. Cavallo arrived in Nairobi to work for the UN in 2007 while Mahad ended up in Kenya because of the civil war. The two met on the set of WAZI?FM and since then never stopped co-creating.

== Reception ==
Reactions to the film were divided; some Somalis felt it painted them in a bad light and brought shame to their community, others were afraid of the consequences of the exposé and there were those who were unaware of the fraud found it eyeopening. Following its premiere in the US, some viewers identified with the desire to be in a state of Bufis, while others were more drawn to criminal aspects of the film and the hardship that comes with being a refugee seeking freedom through illegal immigration. A few audience reviews appeared on Letterbox giving the film a stunning average of 4 stars.
