= Rodd Rathjen =

Australian film director

Rod Rathjen is an Australian film director.

== Life ==
He was born in Colbinabbin and graduated from the Victorian College of the Arts in 2010.

== Career ==
His debut feature film is Buoyancy, which won the Panorama Prize from the Ecumenical Jury. He hopes that the movie sheds light on Thailand's fishing industry and educates Cambodians about the risk of migration.
