= Western Arabs =

- Film poster
- Directed by: Omar Shargawi
- Produced by: Eva Jakobsen; Katrin Pors; Mikkel Jersin
- Cinematography: Omar Shargawi; Aske Foss
- Edited by: Thomas Papapetros
- Music by: Anders "AC" Christensen
- Production company: Snowglobe
- Release date: February 16, 2019 (Berlin)
- Running time: 77 minutes
- Country: Denmark
- Languages: Danish; English; Arabic

Western Arabs is a 2019 Danish documentary film by Omar Shargawi. The film premiered at the 2019 Berlin Film Festival.
