= Love Trilogy: Chained =

2019 film by Yaron Shani

- טרילוגיה על אהבה: עיניים שלי
- Directed by: Yaron Shani
- Written by: Yaron Shani
- Produced by: Naomi Levari; Saar Yogev; Michael Reuter
- Starring: Eran Naim; Stav Almagor; Stav Patay
- Cinematography: Nitzan Lotem, Shai Skeef
- Music by: Hanan Ben Ari
- Distributed by: Alpha Violet
- Release date: February 19, 2019
- Running time: 112 minutes
- Countries: Israel, Germany
- Language: Hebrew

Love Trilogy: Chained (in Hebrew: טרילוגיה על אהבה: עיניים שלי) is a 2019 Israeli drama film, and the second installation of the Love Trilogy film series, written and directed by Yaron Shani. The film's world premier took place at the Berlin International Film Festival. The film follows Stripped (2018), and is followed by the third film in the trilogy, Reborn, which also came out in 2019.

== Plot summary ==
Rafi "Rashi" Malka (Eran Naim) is a respected veteran police officer, who deals with violent situations on the job. He is married to Avigail (Stav Almagor), who is undergoing fertility treatments. Rashi's tough-guy attitude brings him into frequent conflict with his rebellious step-daughter, Yasmine (Stav Patay), and the family's life is unsettled by frequent fighting. The situation deteriorates when two young men suspected of selling drugs claim that Rashi harassed them sexually, and he is suspended from duty while Internal Affairs investigates. The gradual loss of control over his life pushes him over the edge.

== Characters ==
Yaron Shani works with a cast of non-actors, who work without a script, improvising the scenes on-camera. The film is shot in single takes, without rehearsals. The lead actor, Eran Naim, is a former police officer, and played a main role in the film Ajami as well.

- Eran Naim: Rafi "Rashi" Malka - a police officer, married to Avigail, stepfather of Yasmine.
- Stav Almagor: Avigail Malka - Rashi's wife, trying to have a baby.
- Stav Patay: Yasmine - Avigail's teenage daughter from a previous marriage.

== Production ==
The film is an Israel-German co-production. Producers were Naomi Levari and Saar Yogev of Black Sheep Productions, in cooperation with Michael Reuter of The Post Republic. The movie was made with the support of the Israeli Film Fund, Arte, and yes satellite television, and is distributed by Alpha Violet, a French-based independent film distribution company.

== Reviews ==
Israeli newspaper ynet praised both the film and Shani's project, "meant to blend the line between reality and fiction", "intriguing".

== Awards ==
Berlin Film Festival

Year	Nominated work	Category	Result	Notes
2019	Love Trilogy: Chained	Panorama Viewers' Choice	Nominated	

== See also ==
- Love Trilogy: Stripped
- Love Trilogy: Reborn
