= Uli M Schueppel =

German director and documentary filmmaker

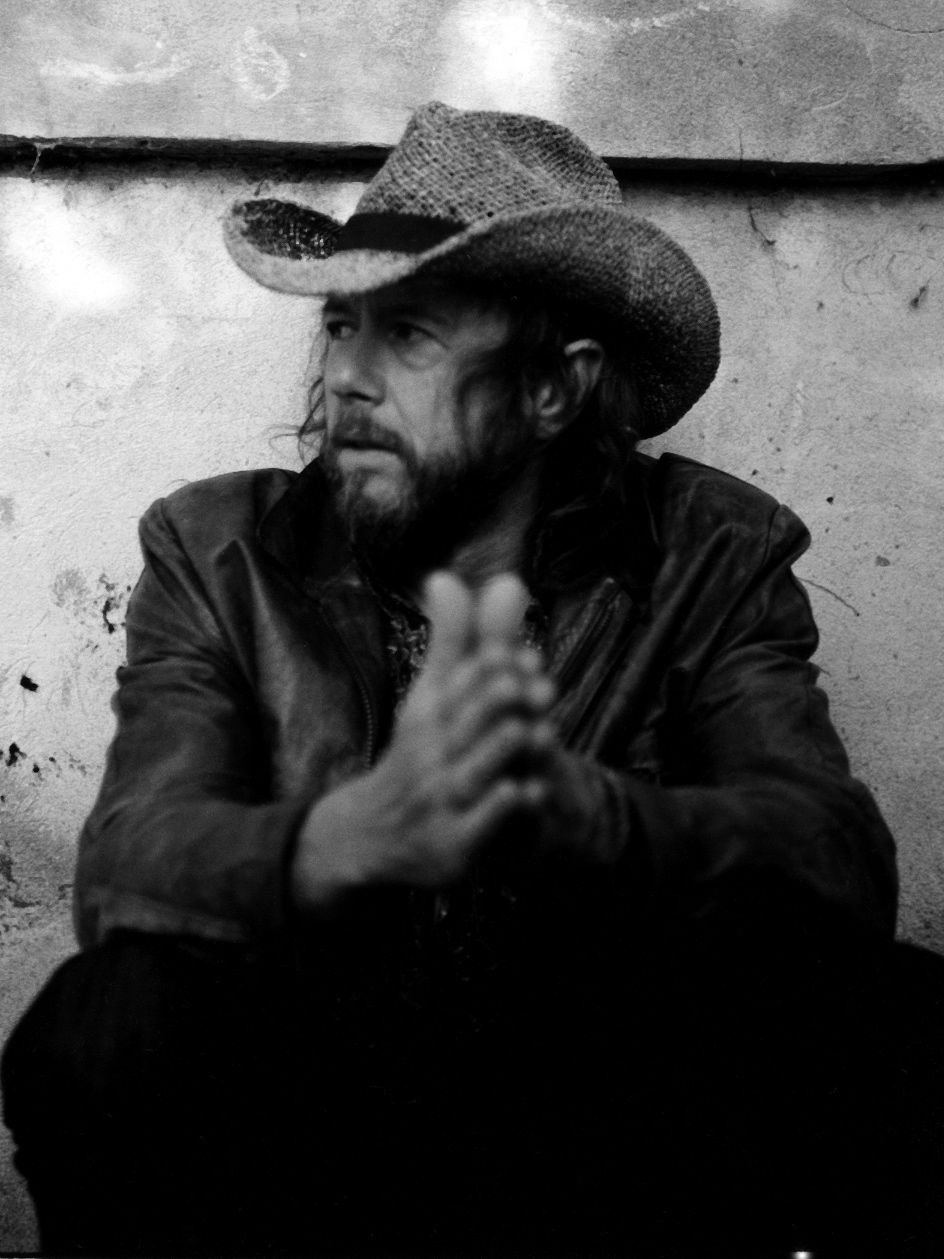
Uli M Schueppel, photo by Joe Dilworth

Uli M Schueppel (born 7 May 1958 in Erbach, Germany as Ulf Schüppel) is a German director and documentary filmmaker. The "M" in the middle of the name is not an abbreviation of a name, but a reference to the Elvis Presley's song "Trouble": My middle name is misery. It is written without dot.

== Life and work ==
=== Early childhood and youth ===
Schueppel is the son of the visual artist and author Hem Schueppel and the educationalist Christine Schueppel, (born as Christine Irmer) and has a younger sister, Heike. The father was an oppositional political activist in East Germany and sent to the Soviet gulag of Vorkuta. Diplomatic reasons delivered him and he was able to move to West Germany in 1955. In 1956 his wife left the East Germany with the two children, and the family moved to Güttersbach. The father was offered a professortship at the Frankfurt University of Applied Sciences for aesthetics and communication, so the family moved to Friedrichsdorf.

Schueppel attended Humboldt-Gymnasium in Bad Homburg vor der Höhe. After this, he stayed in Paris and then studied German studies, Romance studies, and Linguistics at Heidelberg University. Simultaneously he created a Spoken word-formation named Poesie & Krach and published some Compact Cassette and magazines with poetry. Additionally he produced his first short films and wrote film reviews. When he realized that his ambitions went more and more to creating films, he discontinued his studies and moved in 1983 to West-Berlin.

=== 1980s ===
In 1984, Schueppel started his studies at Deutsche Film- und Fernsehakademie Berlin and shot his first short films, playBack2 (1985) and Kopierer gegen Kopierer (1986). Hanging out with his friends of the bands Einstürzende Neubauten, Nick Cave & The Bad Seeds, and Crime & The City Solution in the legendary studios of Hansa Records inspired him producing his first longer movie Nihil, oder alle Zeit der Welt. A lot of friends played in the film like Friedrich Wall, Olivier Picot, Gesine Bohle, Kai Fuhrmann, and Blixa Bargeld. The soundtrack was composed by Alexander Hacke. The film won several prices like the Special Jury-Award, of the Montreal World Film Festival 1988, the soundtrack came out second in 1989 at the Nino-Rota-Preis für Filmmusik of the German film festival Trossinger Filmtage.

The title story of the international movie magazine Filmfaust was devoted for the film.

Since 1988, he anchored parallel to his film studies the nightly radioshow Slime-Line Show once a week together with Johannes Beck, on the German alternative radiostation Radio 100. Once they simulated the fall of the Berlin Wall. Hundrets of people called the radiostation. After this the Radio cancelled the whole show.

In 1989, Schueppel graduated with the documentary film The Road to God Knows Where. The film documents the tour of Nick Cave & The Bad Seeds through the US in the year 1989, and includes a lot of interviews with friends and other important musicians of this time, like Anita Lane, Lydia Lunch, Jim Thirwell, Mick Harvey, Blixa Bargeld, Kid Congo Powers, Rayner Jesson, and Thomas Wydler. In the year 2008, the film was voted within the 20 best musicmovies of all the time by the readers and journalists of Total Film.

=== 1990s ===
With the British-Canadian artist Susan Turcot in 1990 he released the short film A Priori with film score of Alexander Hacke. In the same year he shot the documentary The Song in which Nick Cave & The Bad Seeds record the music video for "Till the End of the World" from Wim Wenders' movie Until the End of the World. In 2004 there was a re-release of The Song in a new arrangement.

In 1992, Schueppel made his first fictional movie Vaterland. In the film an Algerian, the father kidnaps his son into Germany. The soundtrack was again composed by Alexander Hacke and by Mick Harvey. The movie won the 1993 OCIC-Award although there was a veto of the Vatican City.

Jahre der Kälte was released in 1993: the film disputes the way of political ex-convicts from GDR till to sibirian gulags. Schueppel faced up with this film the destiny of his father. The soundtrack was composed by Blixa Bargeld and released through Bargeld – Commissioned Music.

In 1995, he made the documentary Sid&Nancy–Ex&Pop, based on the theater play Sid and Nancy, featuring German film actors Ben Becker, Meret Becker, Alexander Hacke, Otto Sander, and Barbara Philipp.

1997 saw Schueppel he shot Der Platz, a documentary film about the construction work of Potsdamer Platz in Berlin. The soundtrack was made by FM Einheit. From the raw material of this documentary he made a second film, the short film Im Platz (ReMix-Potsdamer Platz), based on the 1920 poem of the expressionist writer Paul Zech, spoken by the German actor Otto Sander.

=== 2000s ===
In 1999/2000, he produced one of the first German full-length movies in Mini-DV format: Planet Alex, stories around of Alexanderplatz in the central Mitte district of Berlin with the German actors Marie Zielcke, Baki Davrak, Nadeshda Brennicke, Ben Becker, Andreas Schmidt, Birol Ünel, Marusha, Meret Becker, Regine Zimmermann, a.s.o.. The soundtrack was composed by Mick Harvey and Alexander Hacke. The film was shown at dozens of international film festivals and at the Museum of Modern Art, and in 2002 it was nominated for Deutscher Fernsehpreis in the categories Best Film soundtrack and Best female supporting actress.

For the Berlin Beta film festival he opened the 2001 Digital Fiction-Award. The 2002 festival was newly organized under the name b.film & digital vision Festival and Schueppel curated the Digital Vision section and the programming of the films. At the conference Medienwoche Berlin-Brandenburg he was curator for the section Digital Entertainment. He gives a lot of lectures about digital filmmaking.

For the Berlin International Film Festival 2001 he created the official trailer, which opens since 2002 all films for all sections. Since 2002 he gives lectures for "dramaturgy and filmdirecting" at the dffb in Berlin and Netherlands Film and Television Academy with special focus on music documentaries.

In 2005, he shot Santos – Heldentaten, die keiner braucht with the German actor Ben Becker. 2006 saw the release of the documentary film BerlinSong, a musical about the Myth of Berlin. In 2006 and 2007 he made several photo/film-installations together with the Norwegian photographer Marie Sjoevold, which were presented in Oslo, Copenhagen, and Jogjakarta.

In 2007 and 2008, he made the film Der Tag, in which he discussed about human mortality. The soundtrack was composed again by FM Einheit. Der Tag won the 2009 New Berlin Film Award at the Achtung Berlin Festival. In those years he made the documentary Von Wegen, a film about the first concert of Einstürzende Neubauten in Eastern-Berlin in the concert hall of VEB Elektrokohle Lichtenberg. Schueppel crossed in the film scenes shot from 1989 with actual shots. The concert was co-directed with Heiner Müller, who gave a speech with the French minister of culture Jack Lang. Von Wegen was shown in the program of the 59th Berlin International Film Festival, and was released under the title Elektrokohle (Von Wegen). The documentary was shown at a lot of festivals and exhibitions worldwide on the occasion of the anniversary of 20 years fall of the Berlin Wall.

In 2009, he got the "Underground Spirit Award" of the 16th European Film Festival Palic for the extraordinary achievement for independent filmmaking.

=== 2010s ===
2010 he released tranzania.living.room, which shows a trip between Tanzania and Germany. It was premiered at the 39th International Film Festival Rotterdam.

In 2010 and 2011, he shot Brötzmann – Da gehört die Welt mal mir, a documentary-film about the band Caspar Brötzmann Massaker in the Berlin club Berghain.

2017 "documenta 14" showed THE ROAD, To God Knows Where in a selection of "major films" compiled by curator Adam Szymcyk.

Since 2018 Schueppel designs as creative director (in collaboration with Arri) the new trailer / opener of all DFFB films (German Film and Television Academy) and created in the same year for the duo HACKEDEPICCIOTTO (Alexander Hacke & Daniele de Picciotto) the music video for the song „Dreamcatcher“.

2019 The poetic film „DER ATEM“ (The Breath) was selected inside the official programme of „69. Int. Film Festival Berlin“ for celebrating its world-premiere. „Der Atem“ (The Breath) is after „The Place“ and „The Day“, the third part of the filmmaker's “Chants”-trilogy on space, time and body.

Schueppel is member of the European Film Academy. Uli M Schueppel lives in Berlin and is father of a son (born 2000). Since 2018 he is married to the photographer Patricia Morosan.

== Selected filmography ==
- 1988 Nihil oder alle Zeit der Welt
- 1990 The Road to God Knows Where
- 1992 Vaterland
- 1994 Jahre der Kälte
- 1996 Sid&Nancy – Ex&Pop
- 1997 Der Platz
- 2000 Planet Alex
- 2004 The Song
- 2005 SANTOS - Heldentaten, die keiner braucht
- 2007 BerlinSong
- 2008 Der Tag
- 2009 Elektrokohle - von wegen
- 2010 tranzania.living.room
- 2012 Brötzmann – da gehört die Welt mal mir
- 2019 DER ATEM (THE BREATH)

== Music videos (selection) ==
- 1988: Lost In Music –Risiko – Anita Lane & Mick Harvey
- 1990: The Gun – Crime & The City Solution
- 2005: Hank Williams Said It Best – Mick Harvey
- 2008: Godman – Singapore Sling-, Summer Garden – Henrik Bjornsson ("Songs&Trees"-Serie), Pokokok- Zai Kuning,
- 2009: Free And Easy – Anton Newcombe, "Songs&Trees"-Serie, Tree Song – Robert Rutman ("Songs&Trees"-Serie)
- 2010: Bassy – Lucky Laughing Panda, Autumn Song – Will Carruthers ("Songs&Trees"-Serie), The Ballad Of Jay Givens – Mick Harvey ("Songs&Trees"-Serie)
- 2012: Crocodile – The Sun and the Wolf
- 2013: I go to sleep – Anika
- 2018: Dreamcatcher – HACKEDEPICCIOTTO

== Awards ==
- 1988: Montreal World Film Festival - "Special Jury Award" (for Nihil)
- 1989: Film Festival Wilhelmshaven - "Compliment of the jury" (for Nihil)
- 1989: Trento Cinema - 2nd Nino Rota-Price (for Nihil)
- 1993: Internationaler Filmpreis der Katholischen Kirche/OCIC-Award, Amiens (for Vaterland)
- 2009: New Berlin Film Award - (for Der Tag)
- 2009: European Film Festival Palic - "Underground Spirit Award"
- 2019 „The Guardian“ voted his film The Road to God Knows Where to place 13 of the most important music-documentaries.
