= Scandar Copti =

Palestinian filmmaker

- اسكندر قبطي
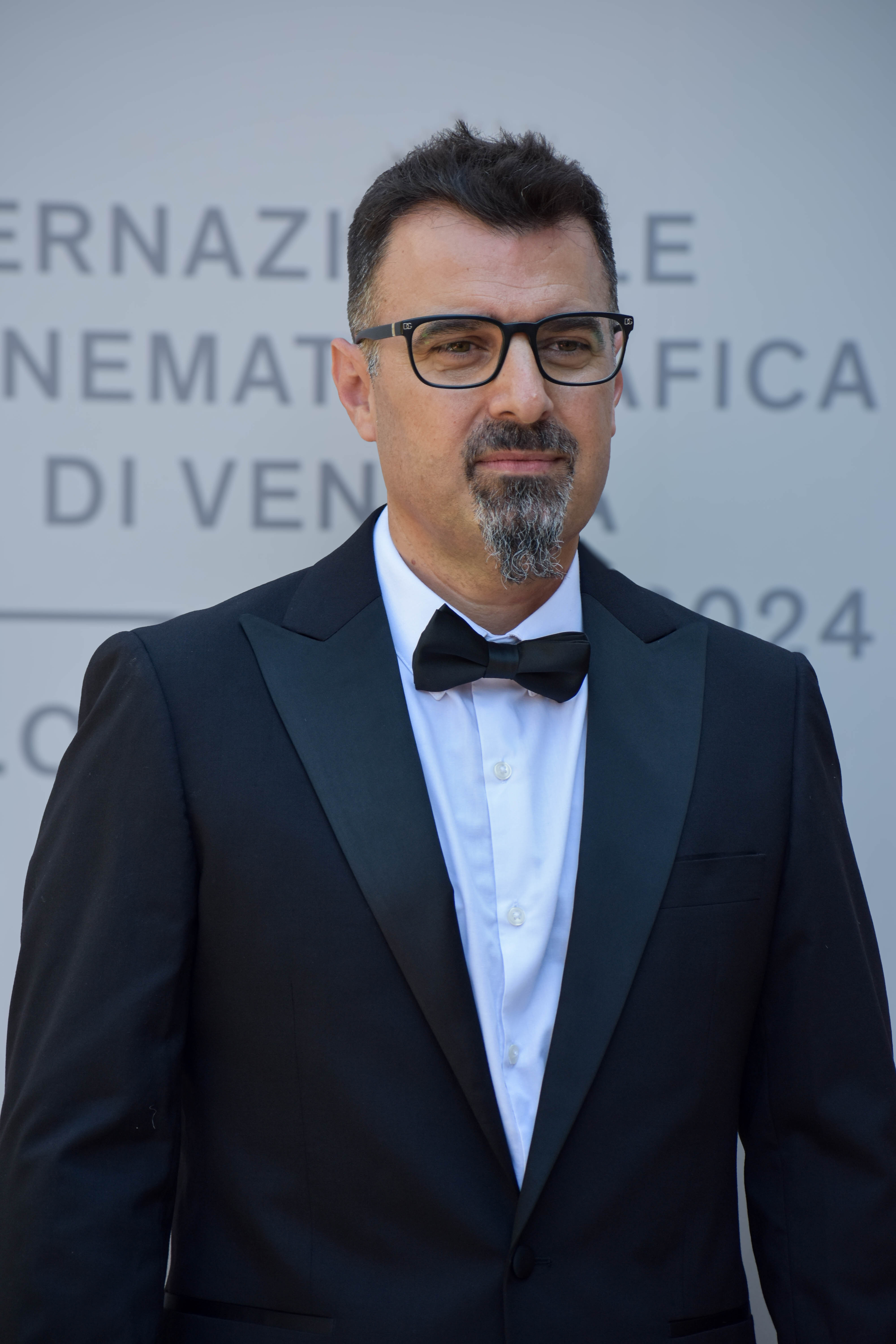
- Copti at the 81st Venice International Film Festival in 2024
- Born: 1975 (age 50–51); Jaffa
- Occupations: Director; screenwriter; actor; producer

Scandar Copti (Arabic: اسكندر قبطي) (born 1975), also known as Iskandar Qubti, is a Palestinian director, screenwriter, actor, and producer. He is known for his feature films Ajami (2009) and Happy Holidays (2024).

== Early life and education ==
Scandar Copti was born in 1975 in Jaffa. His father is a carpenter, while his mother is a teacher, and was principal of the Jaffa Arab Democratic School.

Copti first studied mechanical engineering at the Technion – Israel Institute of Technology, where he was awarded a BA degree.

== Filmmaking career ==
Copti first worked as a mechanical engineer, during which time he wrote, directed, and edited many short films of many times.

In 2003 he filmed a video piece, called The Truth, with Rabih Boukhari. Two Palestinians from Jaffa visit non-touristy sites in the city, recounting the "history" of the place as if they were tour guides presents a series of contradictory dialogues between two men about fictitious stories surrounding several sites, in which they become sacred sites. Copti used the tension in the plot to speak and create a historical narrative as the focal point of this video piece. Copti and Boukhari raised questions about the here and now, the past, and the rewriting of the words so as to enable us to live with the sixty years, expropriated time, and one. According to Tal Ben Zvi, this video work brings up the issue of memory, remembrance, and forgetting, in Palestinian culture in general, and in the city of Jaffa in particular, but ironically this does not generate a meaningful, representative Palestinian national narrative.

The difficulties for Palestinians who are Israeli Arabs and make films with Israeli funding were clearly revealed when Copti directed his first full-length feature film Ajami (2009) with Israeli filmmaker Yaron Shani, which was nominated for an Oscar, won the Ophir Award in Israel, and received the Caméra d'Or Special Mention at the Cannes Film Festival. His film was also nominated for the 82nd Academy Awards in the Best Foreign Film category and was highly awarded internationally. Ajami is a story of an Arab ghetto in the city of Jaffa where violence and hatred are a daily reality. The basis of the film was to capture the reaction to state oppression and the sense of the impossibility of justice by looking at how the criminal element becomes a role model for the young men of Jaffa. In an interview with Channel 2, Copti said, "The film does not represent Israel because I cannot represent the State of Israel, I can not represent a country that does not represent me." Copti said he was more concerned with how the film brought more than 200,000 people to cinemas being the real achievement rather than winning an Oscar, as he wanted to open people's eyes about the reality of Arabs in Israeli territory through the film. According to David Saranga, Senior Foreign Policy Advisor to the President of Israel, Ajami is a representation of the artistic freedom of Israel which is key to all Israeli cultural creativity, and his film did indeed represent Israel. The film received the Sutherland Award from the British Film Institute, for the best debut feature film screened in the BFI London Film Festival.

His second feature film, Happy Holidays (2024), a family drama set in Jerusalem involving characters in intertwined Palestinian and Israeli families, also won several international awards, including Best Screen play in the "Orizzonti" (Horizons) section of the 81st Venice International Film Festival. Its themes of women's lack of personal freedom and agency over their bodies critiqued patriarchal values in both Israeli and Palestinian societies. Copti wrote, directed, and edited Happy Holidays. It was an international co-production, involving Palestine, Germany, France, Italy, and Qatar. Copti said that this film "looks at how moral narratives can bring us together as communities, but also blind us to the suffering of others".

== Other activities ==
Copti was a jury member of the Tribeca Film Festival and the Thessaloniki Film Festival in 2010. In 2011, he chaired the jury of the Human Rights Prize at the International Istanbul Film Festival. He co-founded the Doha Tribeca Film Festival, and founded the Doha Film Institute in Qatar, where he led the education department until November 2011.

In May 2018, Copti ran a patent company, CoptiCo in Beit Hagefen Gallery, Haifa, Israel, for three months. The company manufactured and marketed smart products designed to solve global social and cultural problems, especially Palestinian society. According to the website, "The mission of CoptiCo is to cope with the major issues that are on the agenda of Arab societies and to foster research and development in the fields of peace, coexistence, gender inequality, and social solidarity".

As of 2025 He teaches his technique of working with non-actors at NYU Abu Dhabi and elsewhere.

== Personal life ==
Copti holds Israeli citizenship.

In 2009 Copti was living with his family in Abu Dhabi, teaching film at a local extension of New York University.

== Filmography ==
=== Director ===
- 2024: Happy Holidays
- 2018: Affix (Video short)
- 2018: CoptiCo (Video short/product project of CoptiCo)
- 2018: iAshgar (Video short/product project of CoptiCo)
- 2018: Shishette (Video short/product project of CoptiCo)
- 2018: "Jonnie Mashi" (Music video for Tamer Nafar)
- 2015: "Dam: Who are you" (Music video)
- 2009: Ajami
- 2008: CFJ1 (Documentary short)
- 2003: The Truth (Video short)

=== Writer ===
- 2024: Happy Holidays
- 2018: Affix (Video short)
- 2018: CoptiCo (Video short/product project of CoptiCo)
- 2018: iAshgar (Video short/product project of CoptiCo)
- 2018: Shishette (Video short/product project of CoptiCo)
- 2018: "Jonnie Mashi" (Music video) (Original idea)
- 2015: "Dam: Who are you" (Music video)
- 2009: Ajami
- 2003: The Truth (Video short)

=== Actor ===
- 2016: Fair Trade (Short)
- 2013: The Buried Alive Videos (Short)
- 2009: Ajami
- 2006: Shalosh Ima'ot

=== Producer ===
- 2018: Affix (Video Short)
- 2018: CoptiCo (Video short/product project of CoptiCo)
- 2018: iAshgar (Video short/product project of CoptiCo)
- 2018: Shishette (Video short/product project of CoptiCo)
- 2009: Ajami
- 2003: The Truth (Video short)
