= Ajami (film) =

2009 film

- Arabic-language Theatrical poster
- Directed by: Scandar Copti; Yaron Shani
- Written by: Scandar Copti; Yaron Shani
- Produced by: Moshe Danon; Thanassis Karathanos; Talia Kleinhendler
- Starring: Fouad Habash; Ibrahim Frege; Scandar Copti; Shahir Kabaha; Eran Naim
- Cinematography: Boaz Yehonatan Yaacov
- Edited by: Scandar Copti; Yaron Shani
- Music by: Rabih Boukhari
- Release date: 22 May 2009 (Cannes)
- Running time: 120 minutes
- Countries: Israel; Germany; United Kingdom
- Languages: Arabic; Hebrew
- Budget: $1 million
- Box office: $2.2 million

Ajami (Arabic: عجمي, romanized: ʿAjamiyy; Hebrew: עג'מי) is a 2009 Palestinian Israeli Arab drama film directed by Scandar Copti and Yaron Shani. Its plot is set in the Ajami neighborhood of Jaffa, Tel Aviv, Israel.

== Plot ==
The movie features five storylines, presented out of order, with some events revisited from different viewpoints. Nasri, a young Israeli Arab boy from Jaffa's Ajami neighborhood, narrates the film.

In the first chapter, Nasri's neighbor, a teenager, is killed in a drive-by shooting intended for Nasri's brother, Omar, who sold the victim his car. The attack stems from a feud in which Nasri's uncle paralyzed a member of the Bedouin clan who sought to extort Nasri's uncle. Out of fear for their safety during the feud with the Bedouin clan, Nasri and his sister are sent to Jerusalem, leaving Omar, their mother, and grandfather in Jaffa. Omar seeks help from Abu Elias, a local businessman, who arranges a ceasefire and a settlement of the feud. As part of the settlement, Omar is ordered to pay a hefty sum for peace. Unable to gather the funds, Omar considers fleeing but ultimately stays, feeling trapped.

In the second chapter, we meet Malek, a teenager in Nablus, Palestine, who works at Abu Elias's restaurant to fund his mother's surgery. In dire need of money, Omar and Malek consider the option of dealing drugs. They are introduced to Binj, a local dealer, who is later down by overdosis, and misunderstood as murdered by Malek. The two friends return to Binj's apartment to collect his stash of drugs which they try to sell to a buyer. The sale turns sour when they are attacked by the buyers.

In the third chapter, a Jewish man clashes with his young Arab neighbors over noisy sheep in Ajami, leading to a fatal stabbing. Israeli officer Dan, known as Dando, responds to the scene. As the story shifts to Dando, we learn that he and his family are grappling with the disappearance of his brother Yoni, an IDF soldier. Yoni's fate remains a mystery, but when his remains are discovered, Dando vows to find his killer.

In the fourth chapter, the timelines jumps back. We are reintroduced to Binj, an eccentric cook at Abu Elias's restaurant and friend of Omar, Shata, and Malek, falls for a Jewish girl from Tel Aviv, much to his friends' concern. When Binj's brother is linked to the earlier stabbing in Ajami, police question Binj and his father before releasing them. With his brother on the run, Binj reluctantly agrees to hold a package of cocaine for his brother, hiding them during a gathering. Police officers raid his place but fail to find the cocaine as they search his apartment and promise to return. After they leave, Binj swaps most of the cocaine for powdered sugar. He overdoses on the remaining cocaine. Unaware of this, when Omar return to Binj's apartment (in the second chapter) Omar unknowingly takes the fake cocaine package which he later tries to sell.

In the fifth chapter, Omar and Malek leave for the sale (in the second chapter). Omar's younger brother Nasri insists on coming. Malek talks Omar out of taking his gun, and Omar leaves the gun in the vehicle with Nasri. Initially, it seems Malek is shot when the buyers realize the drugs are fake. However, the buyers are revealed to be police conducting a sting operation, and Dando is among the officers. During the chaos of the confrontation between the officers and Omar and Malek, Dando mistakes Malek's pocket watch for his missing brother Yoni's. Enraged that he is confronting Yoni's killers, Dando attacks Malek, but Nasri intervenes, shooting Dando with Omar's gun. Nasri is fatally shot by another officer. The film ends with Omar running for his life and searching for Nasri, who's missing from the car.

== Production ==
The film was written and directed by Scandar Copti (a Palestinian) and Yaron Shani (an Israeli Jew), Ajami explores five different stories set in an actual impoverished Christian and Muslim Arab neighborhood of the Tel Aviv-Jaffa metropolis, called Ajami. The many characters played by non-professional actors lend the story the feel of a documentary. The Arab characters speak Arabic among themselves, the Jewish characters speak Hebrew among themselves, and scenes with both Arab and Jewish characters are a naturalistic portrait of characters using both languages, as they would in real life.

The film was co-produced by [French, German, and Israeli companies – Inosan Productions, Twenty Twenty Vision, Israel Film Fund, Medienboard Berlin-Brandenburg, ZDF, Arte, and the World Cinema Fund.

== Reception ==
The film holds a 97% rating at Rotten Tomatoes, based on 69 reviews with an average rating of 7.69/10. The website's critical consensus states, "This multi-character drama balances intimate portrayals and broad political implications to paint a bracing and moving portrait of the Middle East conflict". It has a score of 82 out of 100 on Metacritic, based on 22 critics.

In Israel the film was well received, and won the Ophir Award for Best Film, defeating Golden Lion Award-winner Lebanon. It has been compared to Pier Paolo Pasolini's early films, and to more recent crime films such as City of God and Gomorra.

Ajami was the first predominantly Arabic-language film submitted by Israel for the Academy Award for Best Foreign Language Film, and it was nominated for the award. It lost to El secreto de sus ojos (Argentina). It was the third year in a row that an Israeli film was nominated for an Academy Award.

== Awards ==
Ajami won the following awards:

- Cannes Film Festival: Caméra d'Or
- Ophir Award:
  - Best Film
  - Best Director (Scandar Copti and Yaron Shani)
  - Best Screenplay (Scandar Copti and Yaron Shani)
  - Best Music (Rabih Boukhari)
  - Best Editing (Scandar Copti and Yaron Shani)
- Jerusalem Film Festival: Best Full-Length Feature
- BFI London Film Festival: Sutherland Award (for best debut feature film)
- Tallinn Black Nights Film Festival: Best Eurasian Film
- Thessaloniki International Film Festival: Golden Alexander
- The CineMed — The Mediterranean Film Festival of Montpellier: Golden Antigone prize

Ajami was nominated for Best Foreign Language Film at the 82nd Academy Awards. It was also nominated for the European Film Academy Discovery award at the European Film Awards.

== See also ==
- 2009 in Israeli film
