= Yaron Shani =

Israeli film director (born 1973)

- ירון שני
- Born: January 19, 1973 (age 53); Tel Aviv, Israel
- Education: Tel Aviv University
- Occupation: Filmmaker

Yaron Shani (born January 19, 1973) is an Israeli film director, screenwriter, editor, and producer.

Shani graduated from Tel Aviv University, where he directed his graduation film, Disphoria, in 2004.

The 2009 film Ajami, co-written and co-directed by Shani and Scandar Copti, was nominated for Best International Feature for the Academy Awards in 2010. It won the Ophir Awards for best film, director, screenplay, music, and editing, the Thessaloniki International Film Festival's award for best film, and the Sutherland Trophy.

He won the Ophir Award for best director for his 2019 film Love Trilogy: Chained.

== Filmography ==
=== Film ===
- Ajami (2009)
- Life Sentences (2013)
- Love Trilogy: Stripped (2018)
- Love Trilogy: Chained (2019)
- Love Trilogy: Reborn (2019)

=== Television ===
- Innermost (2023)
