= 32nd European Film Awards =

2019 film awards ceremony in Germany

- Date: 7 December 2019
- Site: Berlin, Germany
- Hosted by: Anna Brüggemann and Aistė Diržiūtė
- Produced by: EFA Productions
- Directed by: de:Dietrich Brüggemann
- Organized by: European Film Academy
- Official website: www.europeanfilmawards.eu

Highlights
- Best Picture: The Favourite
- Best Direction: Yorgos Lanthimos; The Favourite
- Best Actor: Antonio Banderas; Pain and Glory
- Best Actress: Olivia Colman; The Favourite
- Most awards: The Favourite (8)
- Most nominations: The Favourite (9)

The 32nd European Film Awards were presented in Berlin, Germany, on 7 December 2019.

== Selection ==
=== Feature ===
The list of feature-length fiction films recommended for a nomination for the 2019 European Film Awards.

- I Do Not Care If We Go Down in History as Barbarians - director: Radu Jude (Romania/Czech Republic/France/Bulgaria/Germany)
- A Tale of Three Sisters - director: Emin Alper (Turkey/Germany/Netherlands/Greece)
- A Twelve-Year Night - director: Álvaro Brechner (Uruguay/Spain/Argentina/France/Germany)
- A White, White Day - director: Hlynur Pálmason (Iceland/Denmark/Sweden)
- An Officer and a Spy - director: Roman Polanski (France)
- All Good - director: Eva Trobisch (Germany)
- And Then We Danced - director: Levan Akin (Sweden/Georgia/France)
- Bad Poems - director: Gábor Reisz (Hungary/France)
- Beanpole - director: Kantemir Balagov (Russia)
- By the Grace of God - director: François Ozon (France/Belgium)
- Chained - director: Yaron Shani (Israel/Germany)
- Clergy - director: Wojciech Smarzowski (Poland)
- Dafne - director: Federico Bondi (Italy)
- Dirty God - director: Sacha Polak (Netherlands/United Kingdom/Belgium/Ireland)
- The Favourite - director: Yorgos Lanthimos (Ireland/United Kingdom/United States)
- Fire Will Come - director: Oliver Laxe (Spain/France/Luxembourg)
- God Exists, Her Name Is Petrunya - director: Teona Strugar Mitevska (North Macedonia/Belgium/Slovenia/Croatia/France)
- Gundermann - director: Andreas Dresen (Germany)
- High Life - director: Claire Denis (France/Germany/United Kingdom/Poland/USA)
- Homeward - director: Nariman Aliev (Ukraine)
- I Was at Home, but... - director: Angela Schanelec (Germany/Serbia)
- It Must Be Heaven - director: Elia Suleiman (France/Germany/Canada/Turkey/Qatar)
- Joy - director: Sudabeh Mortezai (Austria)
- Jumpman - director: Ivan I. Tverdovskiy (Russia/Lithuania/Ireland/France)
- Les Misérables - director: Ladj Ly (France)
- Little Joe - director: Jessica Hausner (Austria/United Kingdom/Germany)
- Mr. Jones - director: Agnieszka Holland (Poland/United Kingdom/Ukraine)
- Non Fiction - director: Olivier Assayas (France)
- Oleg - director: Juris Kursietis (Latvia/Belgium/Lithuania/France)
- Pain and Glory - director: Pedro Almodóvar (Spain)
- Piranhas - director: Claudio Giovannesi (Italy)
- Portrait of a Lady on Fire - director: Céline Sciamma (France)
- Queen of Hearts - director: May el-Touhky (Denmark/Sweden)
- The Realm - director: Rodrigo Sorogoyen (Spain/France)
- Sibel - director: Guillaume Giovanetti, Çagla Zencirci (Turkey/France/Germany/Luxembourg)
- Sons of Denmark - director: Ulaa Salim (Denmark)
- Sorry We Missed You - director: Ken Loach (United Kingdom/France/Belgium)
- Stitches - director: Miroslav Terzić (Serbia/Slovenia/Croatia/Bosnia and Herzegovina)
- Synonyms - director: Nadav Lapid (France/Israel/Germany)
- System Crasher - director: Nora Fingscheidt (Germany)
- Tel Aviv on Fire - director: Sameh Zoabi (Luxembourg/Belgium/Israel/France)
- The Traitor - director: Marco Bellocchio (Italy/France/Germany/Brazil)
- Twin Flower - director: Laura Luchetti (Italy)
- Werewolf - director: Adrian Panek (Poland/Netherlands/Germany)
- The Whistlers - director: Corneliu Porumboiu (Romania/France/Germany)
- Yesterday - director: Danny Boyle (United Kingdom)
- Young Ahmed - director: Jean-Pierre Dardenne, Luc Dardenne (Belgium/France)

=== Documentary ===
Ten documentary festivals have suggested one film each, which has had its world premiere at the respective festival's latest edition, to the committee. Chosen in co-operation with the European Documentary Network (EDN), these festivals are: Cinéma du Réel (France), CPH:DOX (Denmark), Doclisboa (Portugal), DOK Leipzig (Germany), IDFA (Netherlands), Ji.hlava (Czech Republic), Krakow Film Festival (Poland), Sheffield Doc/Fest (UK), Thessaloniki Documentary Film Festival (Greece) and Visions du Réel (Switzerland). Based on their recommendations and the films individually submitted, the documentary committee, decided on the EFA Documentary Selection.

- Advocate - director: Rachel Leah Jones, Philippe Bellaiche (Israel, Canada, Switzerland)
- Aquarela - director: Victor Kossakovsky (Germany, United Kingdom, Denmark)
- Delphine and Carole - director: Callisto Mc Nulty (France, Switzerland)
- For Sama - director: Waad Al-Kateab, Edward Wat (United Kingdom, United States)
- Heimat Is A Space in Time - director: Thomas Heise (Germany, Austria)
- Honeyland - director: Ljubomir Stefanov, Tamara Kotevska (North Macedonia)
- M - director: Yolande Zauberman (France)
- Push - director: Fredrik Gertten (Sweden, Canada)
- Putin's Witnesses - director: Vitaly Mansky (Latvia, Switzerland, Czech Republic)
- Scheme Birds - director: Ellen Fiske, Ellinor Halli (Sweden, United Kingdom)
- Selfie - director: Agostino Ferrente (France, Italy)
- The Disappearance of my Mother - director: Beniamino Barrese (Italy, United States)

=== Short films ===
For the 2019 and 2020 editions of the European Film Awards, the European Film Academy will welcome new festivals to participate in the EFA Short Film selection and awarding procedure. When the annual cycle of participating festivals – running from October of the preceding year to September of the actual awards year – is complete, a committee of short film experts and of EFA Board Members will nominate five of the short film candidates for the award European Short Film.

- November 2018:
  - Internationale Kurzfilmtage Winterthur (Switzerland - from 2019 on)
  - Cork Film Festival (Ireland)
  - PÖFF Shorts (Estonia - from 2019 on)
- Dec. 2018:
  - Leuven International Short Film Festival (Belgium)
- Jan. 2019:
  - International Film Festival Rotterdam (the Netherlands)
- Feb. 2019:
  - Clermont-Ferrand International Short Film Festival (France)
  - Berlin International Film Festival (Germany)
- Mar. 2019:
  - Tampere Film Festival (Finland)
- Apr. 2019:
  - Go Short – International Short Film Festival Nijmegen (the Netherlands)
- May 2019:
  - Krakow Film Festival (Poland)
  - VIS Vienna Shorts Festival (Austria)
- Jun. 2019:
  - Hamburg International Short Film Festival (Germany)
- Jul. 2019:
  - Curtas Vila do Conde - International Film Festival (Portugal)
  - Motovun Film Festival (Croatia)
- Aug. 2019:
  - Locarno Festival (Switzerland)
  - Sarajevo Film Festival (Bosnia & Herzegovina)
  - Venice Film Festival (Italy)
  - Odense International Film Festival (Denmark)
- Sep. 2019:
  - International Short Film Festival in Drama (Greece)
  - Encounters Festival (UK)

== Awards voted by EFA Members ==
Nomination has been announced on November 9, 2019.

=== Feature ===
==== Best Film ====
English title	Director(s)	Producer(s)	Production companies	Country	Language
The Favourite	Yorgos Lanthimos	Ceci Dempsey, Ed Guiney, Lee Magiday, Yorgos Lanthimos	Element Pictures, Arcana, Film4 Productions, Waypoint Entertainment	(United Kingdom) (Republic of Ireland)	English
Les Misérables	Ladj Ly	Toufik Ayadi, Christophe Barral	SRAB Films, Rectangle Productions, Lyly Films	(France)	French
An Officer and a Spy	Roman Polanski	Alain Goldman	Canal+, Eliseo Cinema, France 2 (FR2), France 3 (FR3), Gaumont, Légende Films, Rai Cinema	(France) (Italy)	French
Pain and Glory	Pedro Almodóvar	Agustín Almodóvar, Esther García	El Deseo	(Spain)	Spanish
System Crasher	Nora Fingscheidt	Peter Hartwig, Jonas Weydemann, Jakob Weydemann, Frauke Kolbmüller	Kino Filmproduktion, Wydemann Bros.	(Germany)	German
The Traitor	Marco Bellocchio	Giuseppe Caschetto, Simone Gattoni	IBC Movie, Kavac Film, Rai Cinema, Ad Vitam Production, Gullane, Match Factory Productions, Arte France	(Italy) (Germany) (France) (Brazil)	Italian, Sicilian, Portuguese, English

==== European Comedy ====
The nominees were announced on 29 October 2019. The nominations were determined by a committee composed of EFA Board Members Katriel Schory (Israel) and Angela Bosch Ríus (Spain), distributor/festival programmer Selma Mehadzic (Croatia), film, festival & event specialist Jacob Neiiendam (Denmark) and producer Nik Powell (UK).

English title	Director(s)	Producer(s)	Production companies	Country	Language
The Favourite	Yorgos Lanthimos	Ceci Dempsey, Ed Guiney, Lee Magiday, Yorgos Lanthimos	Element Pictures, Arcana, Film4 Productions, Waypoint Entertainment	(United Kingdom) (Republic of Ireland) (United States)	English
Tel Aviv on Fire	Sameh Zoabi	Gilles Sacuto, Miléna Poylo, Bernard Michaux, Amir Harel, Patrick Quinet	Samsa Film, Lama Films, TS Productions, Artémis Productions	(Israel) (Luxembourg)	Hebrew, Arabic
Ditte & Louise	Niclas Bendixen	Thomas Heinesen	Nordisk Film Production	(Denmark)	Danish

==== Best Director ====
Director(s)	English title
(Greece) Yorgos Lanthimos	The Favourite
(France) / (Poland) Roman Polanski	An Officer and a Spy
(Spain) Pedro Almodóvar	Pain and Glory
(France) Céline Sciamma	Portrait of a Lady on Fire
(Italy) Marco Bellocchio	The Traitor

==== Best Screenwriter ====
Screenwriter(s)	English title
(France) Céline Sciamma	Portrait of a Lady on Fire
(Italy) Marco Bellocchio (Italy) Valia Santella (Italy) Ludovica Rampoldi (Italy) Francesco Piccolo (Italy) Francesco La Licata	The Traitor
(France) / (Poland) Roman Polanski (United Kingdom) Robert Harris	An Officer and a Spy
(France) Ladj Ly (Chile) Giordano Gederlini (France) Alexis Manenti	Les Misérables
(Spain) Pedro Almodóvar	Pain and Glory

==== Best Actress ====
Actress	English title	Role
(United Kingdom) Olivia Colman	The Favourite	Queen Anne
(Denmark) Trine Dyrholm	Queen of Hearts	Anne
(France) Adèle Haenel	Portrait of a Lady on Fire	Héloïse
(France) Noémie Merlant	Portrait of a Lady on Fire	Marianne
(Russia) Viktoria Miroshnichenko	Beanpole	Iya Sergueeva
(Germany) Helena Zengel	System Crasher	Benni

==== Best Actor ====
Actor	English title	Role
(Spain) Antonio Banderas	Pain and Glory	Salvador Mallo
(France) Jean Dujardin	An Officer and a Spy	Picquart
(Italy) Pierfrancesco Favino	The Traitor	Tommaso Buscetta
(Georgia (country)) Levan Gelbakhiani	And Then We Danced	Merab
(Germany) Alexander Scheer	Gundermann	Gerhard Gundermann
(Iceland) Ingvar E. Sigurdsson	A White, White Day	Ingimundur

=== Documentary ===
English title	Director(s)	Producer(s)	Production companies	Country	Language
For Sama	Waad al-Kateab, Edward Watts	Waad al-Kateab	Channel 4 News, Channel 4, Frontline, ITN, Productions, PBS Distribution, WGBH	(United Kingdom) (United States)	Arabic, English
The Disappearance of My Mother	Beniamino Barrese	Filippo Macelloni	Nanof, RYOT Films	(Italy) (United States)	English, Italian
Honeyland	Ljubomir Stefanov, Tamara Kotevska	Atanas Georgiev	Apolo Media, Trice Films	(North Macedonia)	Turkish
Putin's Witnesses	Vitaly Mansky	Natalia Manskaia, Gabriela Bussmann, Filip Remunda, Vit Klusak	Vertov SIA, GoldenEggProduction, Hypermarket Film	(Latvia) (Switzerland) (Czech Republic)	Russian
Selfie	Agostino Ferrente	Marc Berdugo, Barbara Conforti, Gianfilippo Pedote	Magnéto Prod	(France) (Italy)	Italian

=== Animated Feature ===
The nominations were determined by a committee consisting of EFA Board Deputy Chairman Antonio Saura (Spain), EFA Board Member Graziella Bildesheim (Italy) and producer Paul Young (Ireland) as well as, representing CARTOON, the European Association of Animation Film, film critic Stéphane Dreyfus (France), producer Kristine M. I. Knudsen (Germany) and director Janno Põldma (Estonia).

English title	Director(s)	Producer(s)	Production companies	Country	Language
Buñuel in the Labyrinth of the Turtles	Salvador Simó	Manuel Cristobal, José M. Fernández de Vega	Sygnatia, The Glow, Submarine	(Spain)	Spanish
I Lost My Body	Jérémy Clapin	Marc Du Pontavice	Xilam	(France)	French
Marona's Fantastic Tale	Anca Damian	Anca Damian, Ron Dyens, Tomas Leyers	Aparte Film, Minds Meet, Sacrebleu Productions	(France) (Romania) (Belgium)	French
The Swallows of Kabul	Zabou Breitman, Eléa Gobé Mévellec	Michel Merkt, Reginald de Guillebon	Les Armateurs	(France)	French

=== Short film ===
English title	Director(s)	Producer(s)	Country
The Christmas Gift	Bogdan Mureşanu	Bogdan Mureşanu, Vlad Iorga, Victor Dumitrovici, Eduardo M Escribano Solera	Romania, Spain
Dogs Barking at Trees	Leonor Teles	Filipa Reis, Leonor Teles, João Miller Guerra	Portugal
Reconstruction	Jiří Havlíček, Ondřej Novák	Dagmar Sedláčková	Czech Republic
The Marvelous Misadventures of the Stone Lady	Gabriel Abrantes	Justin Taurand, Gabriel Abrantes	France, Portugal
Watermelon Juice	Irene Moray	Miriam Porté	Spain

== Television series ==
=== European Achievement in Fiction Series Award ===
English title	Director	Screenplay	Country of Production	Language
Babylon Berlin	(Germany) Henk Handloegten (Germany) Achim von Borries (Germany) Tom Tykwer	(Germany) Henk Handloegten (Germany) Achim von Borries (Germany) Tom Tykwer	Germany	German

== Technical awards ==
The Favourite has scooped four of the eight technical awards. The jury for the initial eight winners were: Nadia Ben Rachid, editor, France: Vanja Černul, cinematographer, Croatia; Annette Focks, composer, Germany; Gerda Koekoek, hair and make-up artist, Netherlands; Eimer Ní Mhaoldomhnaigh, costume designer, Ireland; Artur Pinheiro, production designer, Portugal; Gisle Tveito, sound designer, Norway; István Vajda, visual effects, Hungary.

=== Best Composer ===
Winner(s)	English title
(Germany) John Gürtler	System Crasher

=== Best Production Designer ===
Winner(s)	English title
(Spain) Antxon Gómez	Pain and Glory

=== Best Makeup and Hairstyling ===
Winner(s)	English title
(United Kingdom) Nadia Stacey	The Favourite

=== Best Sound Designer ===
Winner(s)	English title
(Spain) Eduardo Esquide (Spain) Nacho Royo-Villanova (Spain) Laurent Chassaigne	A Twelve-Year Night

=== Best Cinematographer ===
Winner(s)	English title
(Republic of Ireland) Robbie Ryan	The Favourite

=== Best Costume Designer ===
Winner(s)	English title
(United Kingdom) Sandy Powell	The Favourite

=== Best Editor ===
Winner(s)	English title
(Greece) Yorgos Mavropsaridis	The Favourite

=== Best Visual Effects ===
Winner(s)	English title
(Germany) Martin Ziebell (Germany) Sebastian Kaltmeyer (Sweden) Neha Hirve (Sweden) Jesper Brodersen (Norway) Torgeir Busch	About Endlessness

== Critics Award ==
=== European Discovery - Prix FIPRESCI ===
The nominees were announced on 8 October 2019. The nominations were determined by a committee composed of EFA Board Members Mike Goodridge (UK) and Valérie Delpierre (Spain), festival programmer Azize Tan (Turkey) as well as film critics Marta Bałaga (Finland), Robbie Eksiel (Greece) and Michael Pattison (UK) as representatives of FIPRESCI, the International Federation of Film Critics.

English title	Director(s)	Producer(s)	Production companies	Country	Language
Les Misérables	Ladj Ly	Toufik Ayadi, Christophe Barral	SRAB Films, Rectangle Productions, Lyly Films	(France)	French
Aniara	Pella Kagerman, Hugo Lilja	Annika Rogell	Meta Film Stockholm, Meta Film	(Sweden) (Denmark)	Swedish
Atlantics	Mati Diop	Judith Levy	Meta Film Stockholm, Meta Film	(France) (Senegal) (Belgium)	Wolof
Blind Spot	Tuva Novotny	Elisabeth Kvithyll	Cinekap, Frakas Productions, Les Films du Bal	(Norway) (Denmark)	Norwegian
Irina	Nadejda Koseva	Stefan Kitanov	Art Fest	(Bulgaria)	Bulgarian
Ray & Liz	Richard Billingham	Jacqui Davies	Jacqui Davies	(United Kingdom)	English

== Audience awards ==
=== People's Choice Award ===
The nominees were announced on 2 September 2019.

English title	Director(s)	Production country
Cold War	Paweł Pawlikowski	(Poland) (United Kingdom) (France)
Border	Ali Abbasi	(Sweden) (Denmark)
Dogman	Matteo Garrone	(Italy) (France)
Fantastic Beasts: The Crimes of Grindelwald	David Yates	(United Kingdom) (United States)
Girl	Lukas Dhont	(Belgium) (Netherlands)
Happy as Lazzaro	Alice Rohrwacher	(Italy) (France) (Germany) (Switzerland)
Mamma Mia! Here We Go Again	Ol Parker	(United Kingdom)
Pain and Glory	Pedro Almodóvar	(Spain)
Sink or Swim	Gilles Lellouche	(France)
The Breadwinner	Nora Twomey	(Republic of Ireland) (Canada) (Luxembourg)
The Favourite	Yorgos Lanthimos	(United Kingdom) (Republic of Ireland)
The Purity of Vengeance Journal 64	Christoffer Boe	(Denmark)

=== University Award ===
The European Film Academy and Filmfest Hamburg, a committee consisting of producer Carlo Cresta-Dina (Italy), EFA Board Member Joanna Szymańska (producer/Poland) and university representative Dagmar Brunow (Linnaeus University, Sweden) has decided on the following nominations:

English title	Director(s)	Producer(s)	Production companies	Country	Language
Portrait of a Lady on Fire	Céline Sciamma	Bénédicte Couvreur	Lilies Films	(France)	French
And Then We Danced	Levan Akin	Mathilde Dedye, Ketie Danelia	French Quarter Film	(Sweden) (Georgia (country))	Georgian
God Exists, Her Name Is Petrunija	Teona Strugar Mitevska	Labina Mitevska	Sister and Brother Mitevski, Entre Chien et Loup, Vertigo, Spiritus Movens, Deuxieme Ligne Films	(North Macedonia) (Belgium) (Slovenia) (France) (Croatia)	Macedonian
Piranhas	Claudio Giovannesi	Carlo Degli Esposti, Nicola Serra	Palomar, Vision Distribution	(Italy)	Italian, Neapolitan
System Crasher	Nora Fingscheidt	Jonas Weydemann, Peter Hartwig, Jakob Weydemann, Frauke Kolbmüller	Kineo Filmproduktion, Weydemann Bros.	(Germany)	German

== European Co-Production Award — Prix Eurimages ==
The award acknowledges the decisive role of coproductions in fostering international exchange, and pays tribute to a woman's contribution to the success of film coproduction.

Recipient	Occupation
(Croatia) Ankica Jurić	founder of the production company Kinorama

== Honorary Awards ==
=== European Achievement in World Cinema ===
Recipient	Occupation
(France) Juliette Binoche	actress, artist, and dancer

=== Lifetime Achievement Award ===
Recipient	Occupation
(Germany) Werner Herzog	Director, producer, screenwriter, actor, narrator

== Films with multiple nominations and awards ==
Films that received multiple nominations
Nominations (including awards)	Film
9	The Favourite
6	Pain and Glory
5	Portrait of a Lady on Fire
4	An Officer and a Spy
4	The Traitor
4	System Crasher
3	Les Misérables
2	And Then We Danced

Films that received multiple awards
Wins	Film
8	The Favourite
2	Portrait of a Lady on Fire
2	Pain and Glory

== Broadcasters ==
- (Australia) Foxtel Arts
- (Austria) ORF FM4
- (Belgium) cinenews.be
- (Bosnia and Herzegovina) BHT 1
- (Croatia) HRT
- (Czech Republic) Total Film
- (Cyprus) ARTos Foundation
- (Finland) Helsinki IFF
- (France) Les Arcs FF
- (Georgia (country)) public.ge
- (Germany) RBB online
- (Greece) Cosmote TV
- (Iceland) RÚV
- (Republic of Ireland) RTÉ Player
- (European Union) Cineuropa
- (Italy) Rai Movie, rai.it
- (Kosovo) Dokufest
- (Latvia) Riga Int'l Short FF
- (Lithuania) LRT Plius
- Luxembourg FF
- (Malta) PBS
- (Netherlands) iffr.com
- Norway Film Institute
- (Poland) TVN Fabuła, New Horizons Cinema
- (Portugal) Portuguese Academy Of Film / ICA
- (Romania) Transilvanis IFF
- (Serbia) Freezone Belgrade
- (Slovakia) Theatre Bratislava, Visegrad Film Forum
- (Slovenia) RTVSLO
- (Spain) Movistar+, Movistar CineDoc&Roll, Seville European FF, Filmin
- (Sweden) moviezine
- (United Kingdom) Curzon
- (Ukraine) NTU

== Call to pull Polanski's nominations ==
French feminists and film industry professionals, including Rosanna Arquette, Andrea Bescond, Eric Metayer, Amandine Gay, Catherine Zavlav asked for An Officer and a Spy to be taken out of contention for the awards. The nominations were announced just days after actress Valentine Monnier came forward with her story of allegedly being raped by Polanski in 1975 in newspaper Le Parisien, which was corroborated by contemporary witnesses. The group addressed the request to EFA Production director Marion Doring and jury members Nadia Ben Rachid, Vanja Cernjul, Annette Focks, Eimer Ni Mhaoldomhnaigh, Gerda Koekoek, Artur Pinheiro, Gisle Tveito and Istvan Vadja.
