= 75th Venice International Film Festival =

Italian film festival in 2018

- Festival poster
- Opening film: First Man
- Closing film: Driven
- Location: Venice, Italy
- Founded: 1932
- Awards: Golden Lion: Roma
- Hosted by: Michele Riondino
- Artistic director: Alberto Barbera
- Festival date: 29 August – 8 September 2018
- Website: Website

Venice Film Festival chronology
- 76th 74th

The 75th Venice International Film Festival was held from 29 August to 8 September 2018, at Venice Lido in Italy.

Mexican filmmaker Guillermo del Toro was the jury president for the main competition. Italian actor Michele Riondino hosted the opening and closing nights of the festival. The Golden Lion was awarded to Roma by Alfonso Cuarón.

The festival poster was made by Italian artist Lorenzo Mattotti, who designed it in the way "that attracts the eye, that attracts thought, but without revealing too much."

The festival opened with First Man by Damien Chazelle, and closed with Driven by Nick Hamm.

== Juries ==
The juries of the 75th Venice Festival consist of:

=== Main Competition (Venezia 75) ===
- Guillermo del Toro, Mexican filmmaker - Jury President
- Sylvia Chang, Taiwanese actress, writer, singer, producer and director
- Trine Dyrholm, Danish actress, singer and songwriter
- Nicole Garcia, French actress, film director and screenwriter
- Paolo Genovese, Italian director and screenwriter
- Małgorzata Szumowska, Polish film director, screenwriter and producer
- Taika Waititi, New Zealand film director, screenwriter and actor
- Christoph Waltz, Austrian actor
- Naomi Watts, British actress

=== Orizzonti ===
- Athina Rachel Tsangari, Greek filmmaker - Jury President
- Michael Almereyda, American filmmaker
- Frédéric Bonnaud, French journalist and head of the Cinémathèque française
- Mohamed Hefzy, Egyptian film producer
- Alison Maclean, Canadian filmmaker
- Andrea Pallaoro, Italian filmmaker

=== Luigi De Laurentiis Award for a Debut Film ===
- Ramin Bahrani, American filmmaker - Jury President
- Carolina Crescentini, Italian actress
- Kaouther Ben Hania, Tunisian filmmaker
- Hayashi Kanako, Japanese performance and video artist
- Gastón Solnicki, Argentine filmmaker

=== Venice Virtual Reality ===
- Susanne Bier, Danish filmmaker - Jury President
- Alessandro Baricco, Italian writer and filmmaker
- Clémence Poésy, French actress

=== Venice Classics ===
- Salvatore Mereu, Italian filmmaker - Jury President

== Official Sections ==
=== In Competition ===
The following films were selected for the main competition:

English title	Original title	Director(s)	Production country
The Accused	Acusada	Gonzalo Tobal	Argentina, Mexico
At Eternity's Gate		Julian Schnabel	United States, France
The Ballad of Buster Scruggs		Joel Coen, Ethan Coen	United States
Capri-Revolution		Mario Martone	Italy, France
Close Enemies	Frères ennemis	David Oelhoffen	France, Belgium
The Favourite		Yorgos Lanthimos	United Kingdom, Ireland, United States
First Man (opening film)		Damien Chazelle	United States
Killing	斬	Shinya Tsukamoto	Japan
The Mountain		Rick Alverson	United States
Our Time	Nuestro tiempo	Carlos Reygadas	Mexico, France, Germany, Denmark, Sweden
Never Look Away	Werk ohne Autor	Florian Henckel von Donnersmarck	Germany
The Nightingale		Jennifer Kent	Australia
Non-Fiction	Doubles vies	Olivier Assayas	France
Peterloo		Mike Leigh	United Kingdom, United States
Roma		Alfonso Cuarón	Mexico
The Sisters Brothers		Jacques Audiard	France, Belgium, Romania, Spain
Sunset	Napszállta	László Nemes	Hungary, France
Suspiria		Luca Guadagnino	Italy
22 July		Paul Greengrass	United States
Vox Lux		Brady Corbet	United States
What You Gonna Do When the World's on Fire?		Roberto Minervini	Italy, United States, France

=== Out of Competition ===
The following films were selected to be screened out of competition:

English title	Original title	Director(s)	Production country
Fiction
Dragged Across Concrete		S. Craig Zahler	Canada, United States
Driven (closing film)		Nick Hamm	United Kingdom, United States, Puerto Rico
My Brilliant Friend (series)	L’amica geniale	Saverio Costanzo	Italy, Belgium
My Masterpiece	Mi Obra Maestra	Gastón Duprat	Argentina, Spain
One Nation, One King	Un Peuple et Son Roi	Pierre Schoeller	France, Belgium
The Quietude	La Quietud	Pablo Trapero	Argentina
Shadow	影	Zhang Yimou	China
A Star Is Born		Bradley Cooper	United States
The Stolen Caravaggio	Una storia senza nome	Roberto Andò	Italy, France
The Summer House	Les Estivants	Valeria Bruni Tedeschi	France, Italy
A Tramway in Jerusalem		Amos Gitai	Israel, France
Non Fiction
1938 Different	1938 Diversi	Giorgio Treves	Italy
A Letter to a Friend in Gaza		Amos Gitai	Israel
American Dharma		Errol Morris	United States, United Kingdom
Aquarela		Victor Kossakovsky	United Kingdom, Germany
Carmine Street Guitars		Ron Mann	Canada
El Pepe: A Supreme Life	El Pepe: Una Vida Suprema	Emir Kusturica	Argentina, Uruguay, Serbia
Introduction to the Dark	Introduzione All'Oscuro	Gastón Solnicki	Argentina, Austria
ISIS, Tomorrow. The Lost Souls of Mosul		Francesca Mannocchi; Alessio Romenzi	Italy, Germany
Monrovia, Indiana		Frederick Wiseman	United States
Process		Sergei Loznitsa	Netherlands
Your Face	Ni De Lian	Tsai Ming-liang	Taiwan
Special Events
I diari di Angela - Noi due cineasti		Yervant Gianikian	Italy
The Other Side of the Wind		Orson Welles	United States, Iran, France
They'll Love Me When I'm Dead		Morgan Neville	United States

=== Orizzonti ===
The following films were selected for the Horizons (Orizzonti) section:

English title	Original title	Director(s)	Production country
In Competition
Amanda		Mikhaël Hers	France
The Announcement	Anons	Mahmut Fazil Coşkun	Turkey, Bulgaria
As I Lay Dying	Hamchenan ke mimordam	Mostafa Sayari	Iran
Charlie Says		Mary Harron	United States
The Day I Lost My Shadow	يوم أضعت ظلي	Soudade Kaadan	Syria, Lebanon, France, Qatar
L'Enkas		Sarah Marx	France
If Life Gives You Lemons	Un giorno all'improvviso	Ciro D'Emilio	Italy
Jinpa	撞死了一只羊	Pema Tseden	China
Manta Ray	กระเบนราหู	Phuttiphong Aroonpheng	Thailand, France, China
The Man Who Surprised Everyone	Человек, который удивил всех	Natasha Merkulova, Aleksey Chupov	Russia, Estonia, France
Memories of My Body	Kucumbu Tubuh Indahku	Garin Nugroho	Indonesia, Australia
On My Skin	Sulla mia pelle	Alessio Cremonini	Italy
La profezia dell'armadillo		Emanuele Scaringi	Italy
The River	Ózen	Emir Baigazin	Kazakhstan, Poland, Norway
Soni		Ivan Ayr	India
Stripped	Erom (The Love Trilogy: Stripped)	Yaron Shani	Israel, Germany
Tel Aviv On Fire	תל אביב על האש	Sameh Zoabi	Luxembourg, France, Israel, Belgium
A Twelve-Year Night	La noche de 12 años	Álvaro Brechner	Spain, Argentina, Uruguay, France
Unremember	Deslembro	Flavia Castro	Brazil, France, Qatar
Short Films Competition
A Gift	Kado	Aditya Ahmad	Indonesia
Staircase		Mohsen Banihashemi	Iran
L'été et tout le reste		Sven Bresser	Netherlands
Gli anni		Sara Fgaier	Italy, France
Manila Is Full of Men Named Boy		Andrew Stephen Lee	Philippines, United States
Patision Avenue	Leoforos Patision	Thanasis Neofotistos	Greece
Los bastardos		Tomas Posse	Argentina
All Inclusive		Corina Schwingruber Ilić	Switzerland
Sex, Fear, and Hamburgers	Sex, strakh i gamburgery	Eldar Shibanov	Kazakhstan
Ninfe		Isabella Torre	Italy
Down There	Na li	Zhengfan Yang	China, France
Foreign Body	Strano telo	Dušan Zorić	Serbia
Short Films – Out of Competition
Blu		Massimo D'Anolfi, Martina Parenti	Italy

=== Venice Classics ===
The following films were selected to be screened in the Venice Classics section:

English title	Original title	Director(s)	Production country
Restored films
Adieu Philippine (1962)		Jacques Rozier	France, Italy
The Ascent (1976)	Восхождение	Larisa Shepitko	Soviet Union
Brick and Mirror (1964)	خشت و آینه	Ebrahim Golestan	Iran
Death in Venice (1971)	Morte a Venezia	Luchino Visconti	Italy, France, United States
The Golem: How He Came into the World (1920)	Der Golem – Wie er in die Welt kam	Paul Wegener	Germany
Il posto (1962)		Ermanno Olmi	Italy
The Killers (1946)		Robert Siodmak	United States
The Killers (1964)		Don Siegel	United States
Last Year at Marienbad (1961)	L'année dernière à marienbad	Alain Resnais	France, Italy
Love, Thy Name Be Sorrow aka The Mad Fox (1962)	恋や恋なすな恋	Tomu Uchida	Japan
The Naked City (1948)		Jules Dassin	United States
The Night of the Shooting Stars (1982)	La notte di San Lorenzo	Paolo Taviani and Vittorio Taviani	Italy
The Night Porter (1974)	Il portiere di notte	Liliana Cavani	Italy
Nothing Sacred (1937)		William A. Wellman	United States
The Place Without Limits (1977)	El lugar sin límites	Arturo Ripstein	Mexico
Some Like It Hot (1959)		Billy Wilder	United States
Street of Shame (1956)	赤線地帯	Kenji Mizoguchi	Japan
They Live (1988)		John Carpenter	United States
Documentaries about Cinema
The Great Buster: A Celebration		Peter Bogdanovich	United States
Women Make Film: A New Road Movie Through Cinema		Mark Cousins	United Kingdom
Humberto Mauro		André Di Mauro	Brazil
Living the Light – Robby Müller		Claire Pijman	Netherlands, Germany
24/25 Il fotogramma in più		Giancarlo Rolandi, Federico Pontiggia	Italy
Nice Girls Don't Stay For Breakfast		Bruce Weber	United States
Friedkin Uncut		Francesco Zippel	Italy

=== Sconfini ===
The following films were selected for the Sconfini section:

English title	Original title	Director(s)	Production country
Blood Kin		Ramin Bahrani	United States
Il banchiere anarchico		Giulio Base	Italy
The Happiest Man in the World	Il ragazzo più felice del mondo	Gipi	Italy
Arrivederci Saigon		Wilma Labate	Italy
The Tree of Life		Terrence Malick	United States
School's Out	L'heure de la sortie	Sébastien Marnier	France
Magic Lantern		Amir Naderi	United States
Camorra		Francesco Patierno	Italy

== Independent Sections ==
=== Venice International Critics' Week ===
The following films were selected for the 33th Venice International Critics' Week (Italian: Settimana Internazionale della Critica):

English title	Original title	Director(s)	Production country
In competition
Adam & Evelyn	Adam und Evelyn	Andreas Goldstein	Germany
Akasha		Hajooj Kuka	Sudan, South Africa, Qatar, Germany
Blonde Animals	Bêtes blondes	Alexia Walther, Maxime Matray	France
M		Anna Eriksson	Finland
Still Recording		Saaed Al Batal, Ghiath Ayoub	Syria, Lebanon, Qatar, France
We'll Be Young and Beautiful	Saremo giovani e bellissimi	Letizia Lamartire	Italy
You Have the Night	Ti imas noc	Ivan Salatic	Montenegro, Serbia
Special events – Out of competition
Dachra		Abdelhamid Bouchnak	Tunisia
Tumbbad		Rahi Anil Barve, Adesh Prasad	India, Sweden

=== Giornate degli Autori ===
The following films were selected for the 15th edition of the Giornate degli Autori (Venice Days) section:

English title	Original title	Director(s)	Production country
In Competition
Domingo		Clara Linhart, Fellipe Barbosa	Brazil, France
Graves Without a Name (opening film)	Les tombeaux sans noms	Rithy Panh	Cambodia, France
José		Li Cheng	Guatemala, United States
Joy		Sudabeh Mortezai	Austria
Keep Going	Continuer	Joachim Lafosse	Belgium, France
Pearl		Elsa Amiel	France, Switzerland
Real Love	C'est ça l'amour	Claire Burger	France
Remember?	Ricordi?	Valerio Mieli	Italy, France
Screwdriver	Mafax	Bassam Jarbawi	Palestine, United States, Qatar
Three Adventures of Brooke	星溪的三次奇遇	Yuan Qing	China, Malaysia
Ville Neuve		Félix Dufour-Laperrière	Canada
Out of competition
Emma Peeters (closing film)		Nicole Palo	Belgium, Canada
Special events
As We Were Tunas		Francesco Zizola	United States, Italy
Dead Women Walking		Hagar Ben-Asher	United States
Goodbye Marilyn		Maria Di Razza	Italy
Happy Lamento		Alexander Kluge	Germany
My Own Good	Il bene mio	Pippo Mezzapesa	Italy
The Ghost of Peter Sellers		Peter Medak	Cyprus
Why Are We Creative?		Hermann Vaske	Germany
Miu Miu Women's Tales
#15 Hello Apartment		Dakota Fanning	Italy, United States
#16 The Wedding Singer's Daughter		Haifaa Al-Mansour	Italy, United States

== Official Awards ==
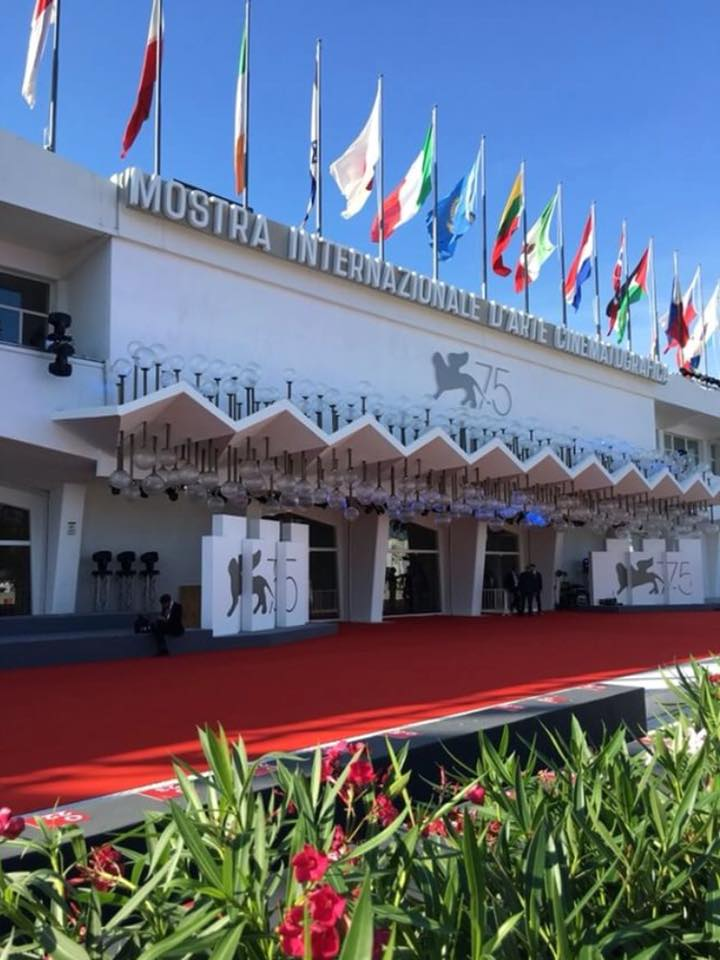
The main entrance of the Cinema Palace during the festival.

=== In Competition (Venezia 75) ===
- Golden Lion: Roma by Alfonso Cuarón
- Grand Jury Prize: The Favourite by Yorgos Lanthimos
- Silver Lion: The Sisters Brothers by Jacques Audiard
- Volpi Cup for Best Actress: Olivia Colman for The Favourite
- Volpi Cup for Best Actor: Willem Dafoe for At Eternity's Gate
- Best Screenplay: The Ballad of Buster Scruggs by Joel and Ethan Coen
- Special Jury Prize: The Nightingale by Jennifer Kent
- Marcello Mastroianni Award: Baykali Ganambarr for The Nightingale

=== Orizzonti ===
- Best Film: Manta Ray by Phuttiphong Aroonpheng
- Best Director: The River by Emir Baigazin
- Special Jury Prize: The Announcement by Mahmut Fazil Coşkun
- Best Actress: Natalia Kudryashova for The Man Who Surprised Everyone
- Best Actor: Kais Nashef for Tel Aviv On Fire
- Best Screenplay: Jinpa by Pema Tseden
- Horizons Prize for Best Short: A Gift by Aditya Ahmad

=== Luigi De Laurentiis Award for a Debut Film (Lion of the Future) ===
- The Day I Lost My Shadow by Soudade Kaadan

=== Venice Classics (Venezia Classici) ===
- Best Documentary on Cinema: The Great Buster: A Celebration by Peter Bogdanovich
- Best Restored Film: The Night of the Shooting Stars by Paolo Taviani and Vittorio Taviani

=== Golden Lion for Lifetime Achievement ===
- David Cronenberg
- Vanessa Redgrave

== Independent Sections Awards ==
The following collateral awards were conferred to films of the autonomous sections:

=== Venice International Critics' Week ===
- Sun Film Group Audience Award: Still Recording by Saeed Al Batal and Ghiath Ayoub
- Verona Film Club Award: Blonde Animals by Maxime Matray and Alexia Walther
- Mario Serandrei – Hotel Saturnia Award for the Best Technical Contribution: Still Recording by Saeed Al Batal and Ghiath Ayoub

=== Giornate degli Autori ===
- SIAE Award: Mario Martone for his artistic career and for his last picture, Capri-Revolution
- GdA Director's Award: Real Love by Claire Burger
- BNL People's Choice Award: Ricordi? by Valerio Mieli
- Europa Cinemas Label Award: Joy by Sudabeh Mortezai
- Hearst Film Award: Joy by Sudabeh Mortezai

== Independent Awards ==
The following collateral awards were conferred to films of the official selection:

=== Arca CinemaGiovani Award ===
- Best Italian Film: Capri-Revolution by Mario Martone
- Venezia 75 Best Film: Never Look Away by Florian Henckel von Donnersmarck

=== Brian Award ===
- On My Skin by Alessio Cremonini

=== Enrico Fulchignoni – CICT-UNESCO Award ===
- El Pepe: Una Vida Suprema by Emir Kusturica

=== FEDIC (Federazione Italiana dei Cineclub) Award ===
- On My Skin by Alessio Cremonini
  - Special mention: Ricordi? by Valerio Mieli
- Mention FEDIC Il Giornale del Cibo: I villani by Daniele De Michele

=== FIPRESCI Awards ===
- Best Film (main competition): Sunset by László Nemes
- Best Film (other sections): Still Recording by Saeed Al Batal and Ghiath Ayoub

=== Gillo Pontecorvo Award (Best co-production for a debut film) ===
- The Road Not Taken by Tang Gaopeng

=== Green Drop Award ===
- At Eternity's Gate by Julian Schnabel

=== Lanterna Magica Award (CGS) ===
- Amanda by Mikhael Hers

=== Leoncino d'Oro Agiscuola per il Cinema Award ===
- Never Look Away by Florian Henckel von Donnersmarck

=== Cinema for UNICEF Award ===
- What You Gonna Do When the World's on Fire? by Roberto Minervini

=== Queer Lion ===
- Josè by Li Cheng

=== SIGNIS Award ===
- Roma by Alfonso Cuarón
  - Special mention: 22 July by Paul Greengrass

=== C. Smithers Foundation Award – CICT-UNESCO ===
- A Star Is Born by Bradley Cooper
  - Special mention: The Mountain by Rick Alverson

=== Robert Bresson Award ===
- Liliana Cavani

=== Franca Sozzani Award ===
- Salma Hayek

=== Campari Passion for the Cinema Award ===
- Bob Murawski for The Other Side of the Wind

=== Pietro Bianchi Award ===
- Carlo Verdone

=== Fondazione Mimmo Rotella Award ===
- Julian Schnabel and Willem Dafoe for At Eternity's Gate
