= The River (2018 film) =

Film directed by Emir Baighazin

- Film poster
- Ozen
- Directed by: Emir Baigazin
- Written by: Emir Baigazin
- Starring: Zhalgas Klanov; Kuandyk Kystykbayev; Aida Iliyaskyzy; Eric Tazabekov
- Release date: 3 September 2018 (Venice)
- Country: Kazakhstan
- Languages: Kazakh, Russian

The River (Kazakh: Ózen) is a drama film, directed by Emir Baigazin and released in 2018.

Considered the third part of a trilogy with Baigazin's earlier films Harmony Lessons and The Wounded Angel, the film stars Zhalgas Klanov as Aslan, a teenage boy who is entrusted by their strict and physically abusive father (Kuandyk Kystykbayev) to supervise his brothers in their farm chores. He frequently takes them to the nearby river to swim and lounge in the sun as a temporary respite from their home life, leading to disruption of the family order when the boys' cousin (Eric Tazabekov) arrives and exposes the boys to many of the technological temptations of contemporary modern life from which their father had shielded them.

An excerpt from the film was screened at the Karlovy Vary Film Festival in 2017, as part of its Works in Progress program. The completed film premiered at the 75th Venice International Film Festival in September 2018, where Baigazin won the award for Best Director in the Horizons program. Its second screening was in the Platform program at the 2018 Toronto International Film Festival, where it received an honorable mention from the Platform Prize jury.
