= Red PAT =

PAT
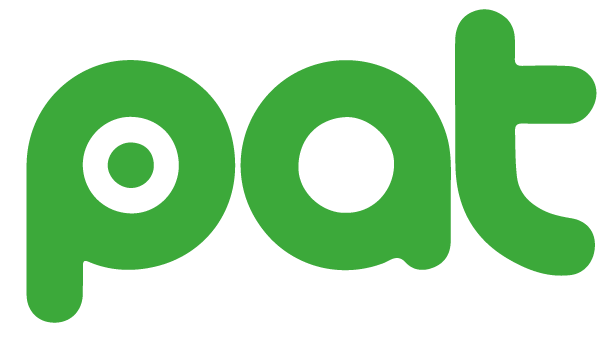
- Country: Bolivia

Programming
- Picture format: 1080i HDTV (downscaled to 480i for the SD feed)

Ownership
- Owner: Periodistas Asociados de Televisión PAT Ltda.

History
- Launched: 1990 (production company); September 1998 (channel)

Links
- Website: https://www.redpat.tv/

PAT (Periodistas Asociados Televisión, literally Associate Journalists Television), also called Red PAT, is a Bolivian over-the-air television channel founded as a production company in August 1990 by the politician and journalist Carlos Mesa. It became a channel in 1998.

== History ==
=== As a production company ===
On August 1, 1990, Carlos Mesa, Mario Espinoza, Amalia Pando and Ximena Valdivia created the PAT company, initially as a news producer. The idea originated when at Telesistema Boliviano, Pando, Mesa and Espinoza, agreed to establish their own news production company (the first of its kind in Bolivia); Valdivia provided the loans. The independent news production company produced two newscasts: 2nd Edition at noon and 3rd Edition at night. The name 1st Edition was reserved until the birth of the channel. The first channel was Canal Once, under the direction of René Meyer, broadcasting began on September 15 of the same year. In 1990 it was broadcast on América Televisión (channel 6 in La Paz); and in 1997 to Bolivisión when it was just beginning its broadcasts, its headquarters were on Av. Saavedra in Miraflores and the production company had no problems since its birth, it won the 1992-1997 tender of the ADN-MIR alliance (being the only bidder), the 1997-2001 tender of the MNR Government. Apart from the newscast, the PAT production company produced three more programs: De Frente, hosted and directed by Amalia Pando, focused on investigative reporting; Behind the News hosted by Mario Espinoza with a documentary format and focused on historical events and De Cerca hosted by Carlos Mesa, but broadcast from the ATB network studios. Carlos Mesa's production company was also involved in the production of a national film: Jonás y la ballena rosada, a joint production with Mexico. in 1995. Between September 1983 and March 1998, one of its main programs, De Cerca, conducted 472 interviews, statistically more than half were given to 81 personalities, with Gonzalo Sánchez de Lozada appearing a record fifteen times.

In 1998, when PAT was setting up its own network, Bolivisión ceased carrying its newscasts and started producing its own.

=== Crisis as a production company and creation of Red PAT ===
In August 1997, Gonzalo Sánchez de Lozada handed over the presidential sash to Hugo Banzer Suarez. Its main partner is the MIR, the conflict arose when PAT (through the bidding of the then TVB) denounced the so-called narco-links, emphatically denounced by PAT. This time, the anti-gonism that was in the government would not make any more concessions. With Carlos Mesa leaving TVB, he founded his own channel, with the same name as his production company, PAT. In October 1998, PAT moved a few meters higher and inaugurated its new building. The list indicated the three main shareholders and two minor shareholders: Barbery, Mesa and Valdivia.

With the corporate participation of the owner of El Deber, the airing of PAT was financed. To make it a reality, 100,000 US dollars were deposited in the Telecommunications Superintendency (current ATT) to obtain the license. Another development was the creation of Ítaca on August 1, 1998, with four new shareholders. PAT moves from its former two-floor facility to a new five-floor building. In September 1998 PAT became a national network. The network was also able to send its newscasts and sports programs to Sistema Unido de Retransmisión in the United States and other parts of the world.

The channel initially pledged not to broadcast telenovelas, but eventually started airing a Brazilian one. In this period, Red PAT won three Best UHF Channel awards from independent surveys in 1998, 1999 and 2001.

=== Espinoza era (2002-2007) and sale to Daher (2007-2012) ===
Once Carlos Mesa left the direction of PAT, Abdallah Edmond Daher Bulus, a shareholder of Aerosur, bought his shares and the identity of the channel changed and the Santa Cruz branch became more important. In the 2002 general elections, the MNR, the party for which Mesa was running, won by a small margin. The time was turbulent and just a few months later Gonzalo Sánchez de Lozada resigned the presidency and Carlos Mesa assumed office. In 2003 Mario Espinoza created a program called El Pentagono where the future vice president Álvaro García Linera regularly attended as a panelist and also Verónica Larrieu, a model from Santa Cruz. Amalia Pando resigns due to differences between her and the other shareholders of the network.

The government of Evo Morales was constantly criticized in No Mentirás and focused on the economic and legal suffocation of the Aerosur airline, pointing to one of its shareholders Abdallah Daher, who as owner of Red PAT made these criticisms. Finally, in 2012, after years of economic and legal problems, Aerosur closed and Abdallah Daher had to sell his shares in PAT, making it a condescending media outlet for the ruling party.

According to a 2011 survey conducted by Revista IN, PAT was the fourth most watched national network in Bolivia, with 8% of the audience share, up from 4% in 2008.

=== 2012 to 2019 ===
Between 2012 and 2019, the PAT network had adopted a different editorial line. The programming is based on newscasts, talk-shows, reality-shows and some self-produced documentaries. The main newscasts are broadcast from Santa Cruz de la Sierra and La Paz. Also since 2015, it begins to pay licenses from Televisa, Telemundo, Grupo Imagen and Nickelodeon, among others.

PAT had become a parastatal outlet since 2011 and was partial to the Government of Evo Morales. The channel is accused of evading taxes in exchange for being the third channel to receive advertising and government sponsorship (behind Bolivia TV and Red ATB, first and second respectively), in addition to being managed by businessmen related to former vice president Álvaro García Linera. In return for this, the company that owns it begins to produce documentaries that, according to its editorial line, favor the government party.

In 2015, the channel premiered an adaptation of the Peruvian format Esto es guerra, which in the middle of that year was renewed for a second season. The network announced in February 2018 that it would install a new HD-ready master control facility in Santa Cruz, which would be used to connect with the Túpac Katari satellite (TKSAT-1), which was already delivering PAT's signals in HD. It was expected that digital terrestrial broadcasts for the network would start in November 2019. In April 2018, during its 2018 screening, it unveiled a new brand identity, accompanied by a new slogan, Vive todos los colores (live all colors), reflecting its new vision to Bolivians and emphasizing its commitment to national productions. By February 2019, installation of the new master controls from Ross and Harmonic were underway, first in Santa Cruz and later in La Paz, as well as the digitization of the PAT stations in the trunk axis (Santa Cruz, La Paz, Cochabamba)

=== Since 2019 ===
On November 10, 2019, derived from the Bolivian political crisis that led to the renunciation of Evo Morales, and the succession by Jeanine Áñez, the Ministry of Government initiated a series of penal lawsuits against the network's administrators, as well as ATB's executives, and the national newspaper La Razón, accusating them of illicit economic acts with the government party and Evo Morales.

In this case, Marcelo Hurtado was implicated in the irregular purchase of PAT, which led to his arrest and being charged on January 3, 2020, by the Bolivian Prosecutor's Office. Hurtado is released, and then he is detained again, this time, by ATB. Months later he reported being extorted by prosecutor Marco Cossió to give up shares and control over ATB.

Unlike ATB and La Razón, PAT did not take up an editorial line favorable to the MAS-IPSP and the government of Luis Arce.

The former executives, with former minister Hector Arce Zaconeta as lawyer, begin a legal battle against Daher to regain financial and editorial control of the outlet. However, on November 17, 2021, Judge Angela Patricia Hira restored PAT's shares in favor of Daher.

== Presenters ==
- Jimena Antelo
- María Delgado
- Carolina Paz
- Graciela Novaski
- Juan Manuel d'Arruda Deux

=== Official announcer ===
- Carlos Flores (2009–present)

== Network ==
Stations given to Periodistas Asociados Televisión
Location	Channel
Trinidad	42
Sucre	42
Cochabamba	42
La Paz	39
Oruro	42
Cobija	42
Potosí	42
Santa Cruz de la Sierra	42
Tarija	42

== Logos ==
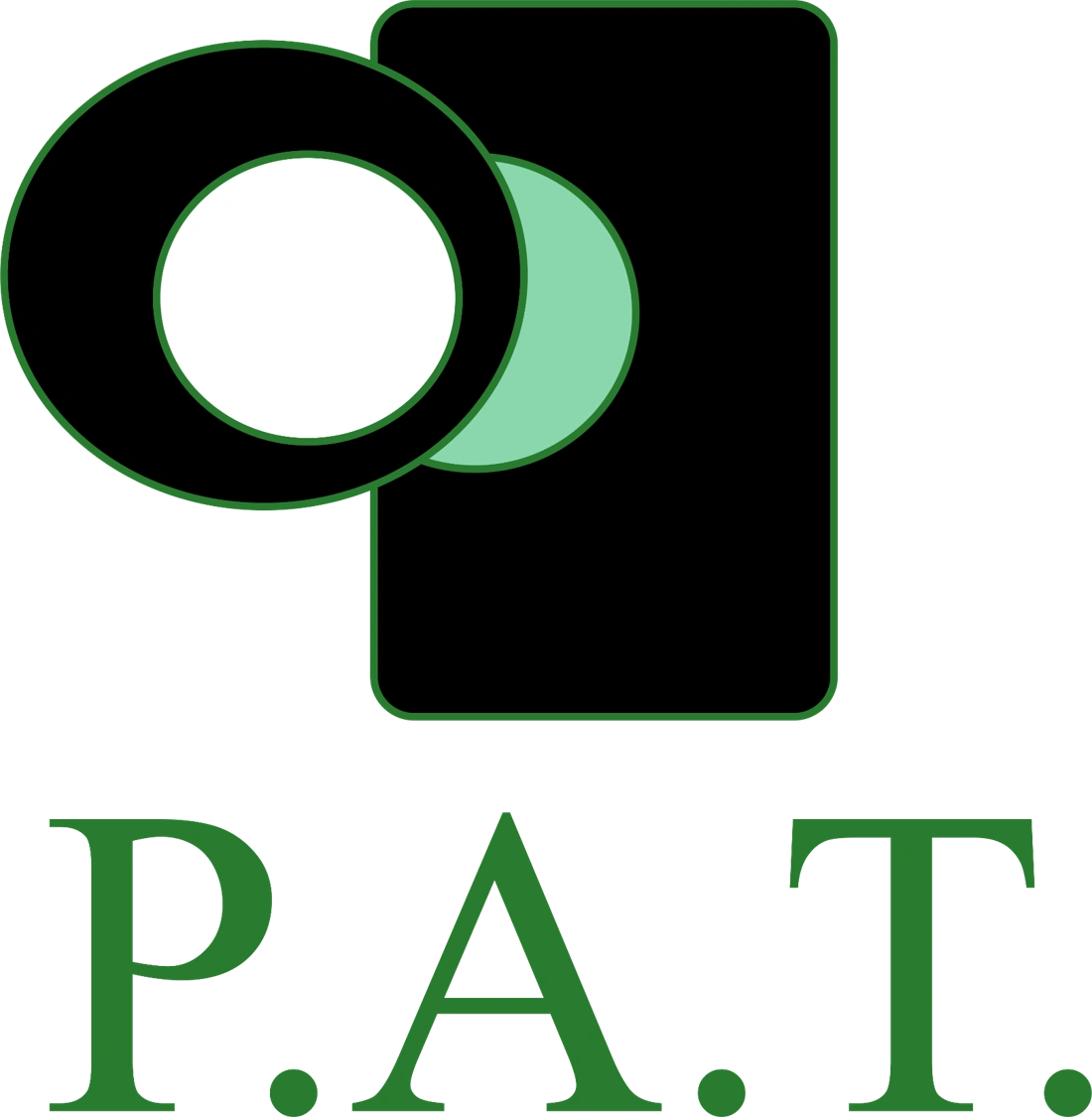
1990-2007

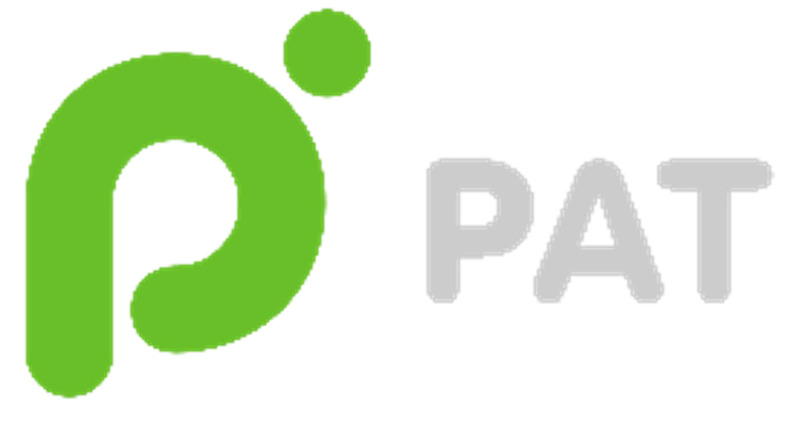
2007-2008

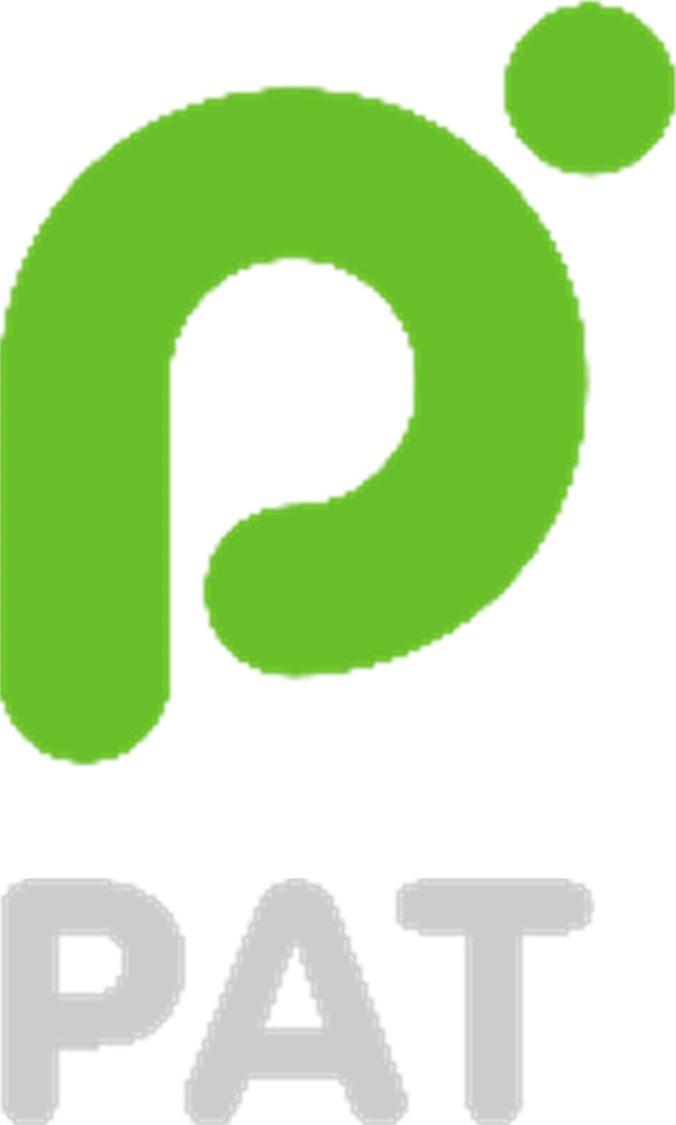
2008-2010

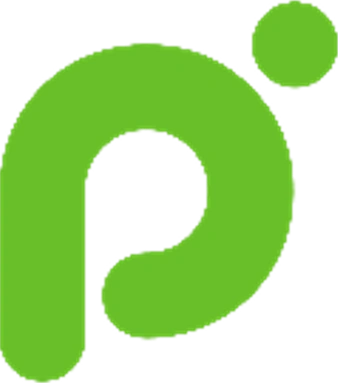
2010-2011

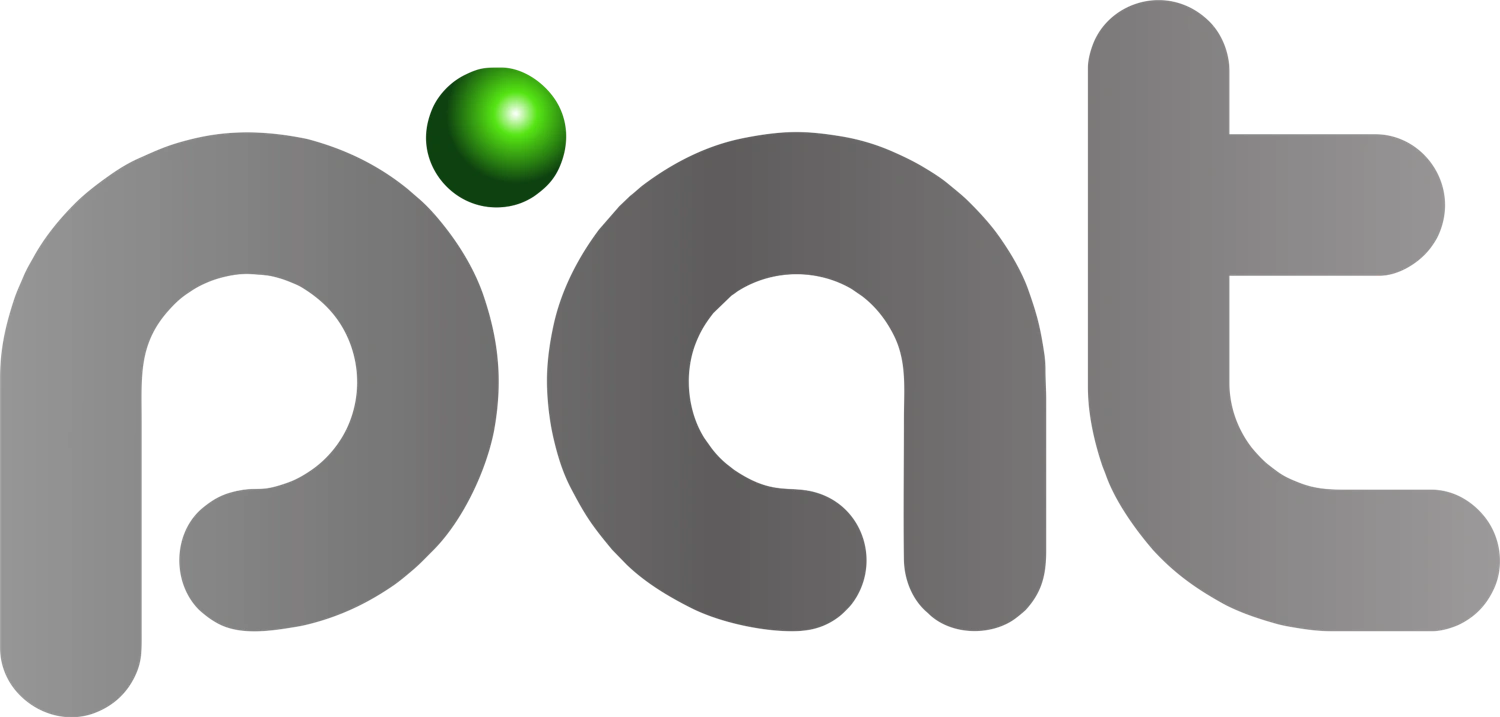
2011-2013

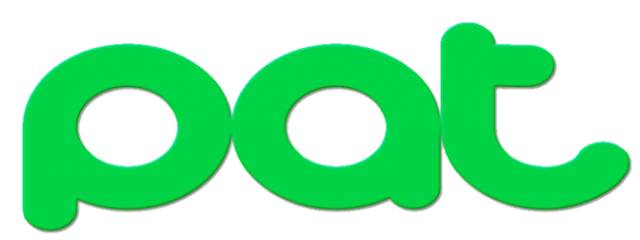
2013-2016

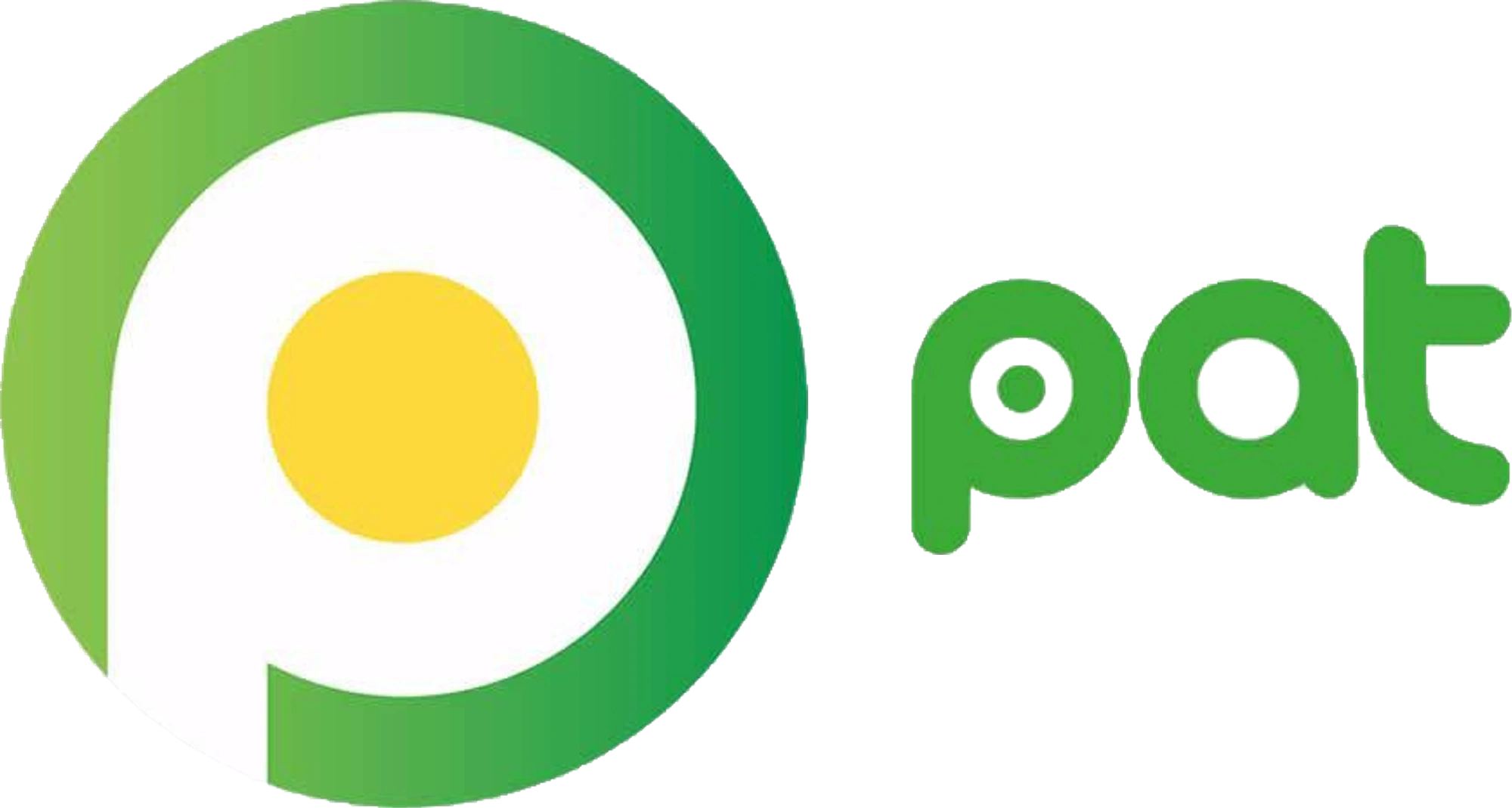
2016-2021

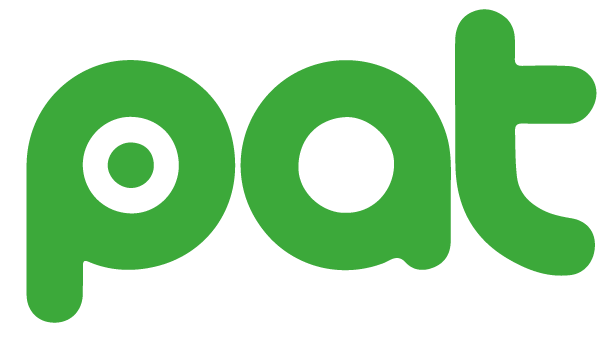
Since 2021

== Controversies ==
=== Usage of footage from Lost claiming as footage of the Air France crash ===
On June 18, 2009, PAT's news service ran a report showing supposed footage of the Air France crash that happened nineteen days earlier. It was revealed that the footage came from the pilot of Lost. The photos were supposedly attributed to supposed passenger Paulo Muller, which was non-existent, and the supposed Air France plane was from the fictional airline Oceanic Airlines, name used in a variety of TV series and movies, to prevent allusions to real-life airlines and their accidents. The camera supposedly came from Serra do Cachimbo in Brazil.

=== No Mentiras scandal ===
In an interview on the program No Mentiras, hosted by Jimena Antelo and produced by José Pomacusi, the then Commander of the Army, Juan José Zúñiga, was interviewed, where he accused Evo Morales of instigating polarization and of obtaining the nomination at all costs. to the presidency. These events preceded the attempted coup d'état in Bolivia.

As Carlos Romero becomes a shareholder of the channel, the direction of the same argument that "there was fumigation of the sets", but then and inexplicably, the program was taken off the air. The 15-year contract ended in October, but due to Romero's closeness to Evo Morales, it was decided not to renew the contract and cancel the program.
