= Joy Alphonsus =

Nigerian-born Austrian actress

Joy Anwulika Alphonsus
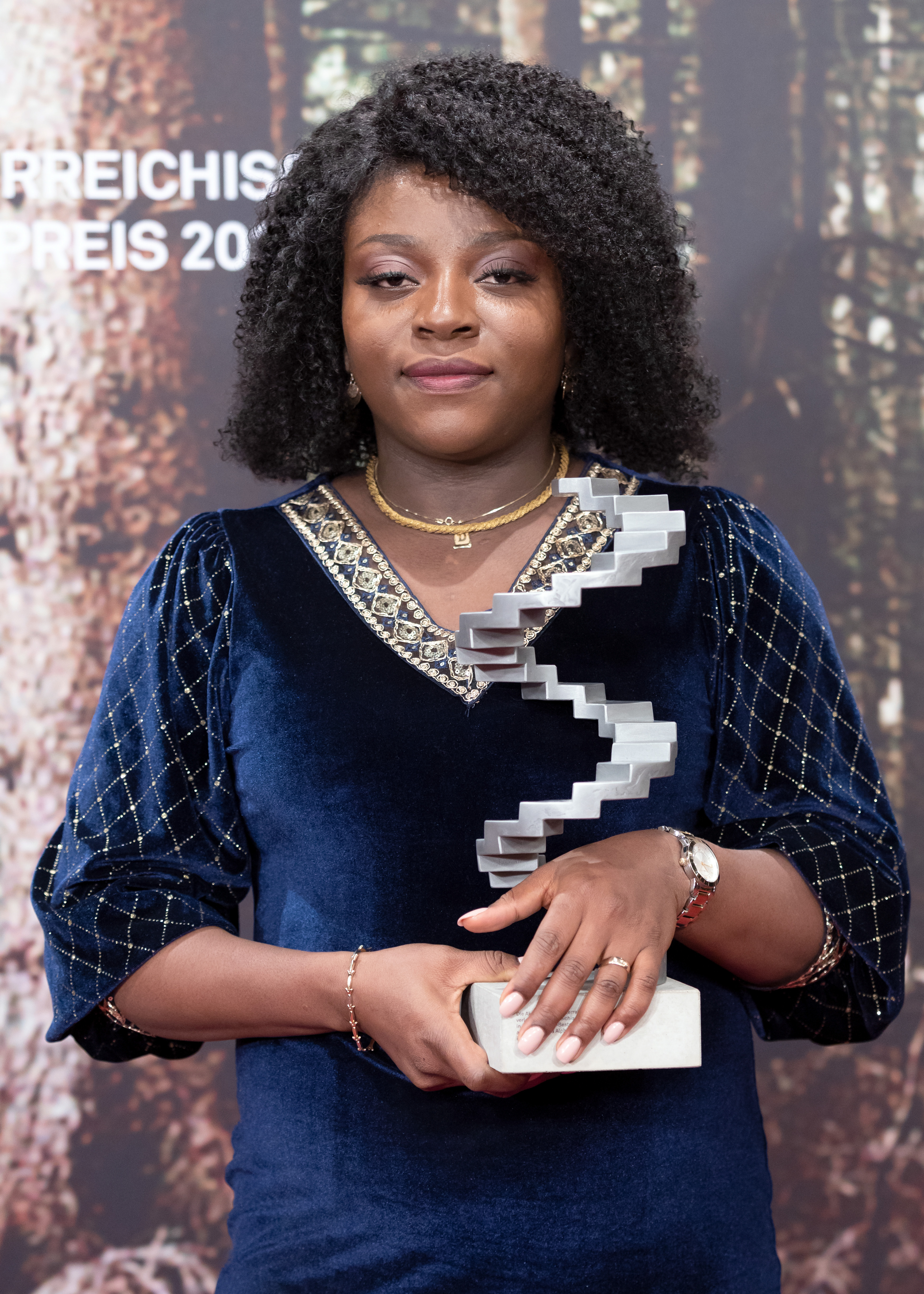
- Born: Joy Anwulika Alphonsus; August 31, 1987 (age 39); Nigeria
- Occupations: Actor, public speaker
- Years active: 2018–present
- Awards: Best Actress - Seville International Film Festival (2018); Diagonale Acting Award (2019); Best Actress - Austrian Film Awards (2020)

Joy Anwulika Alphonsus (born 31 August 1987), popularly known as Joy Alphonsus, is a Nigerian-born actress. She is best known for the title role in the critically acclaimed award-winning film Joy.

== Personal life ==
Alphonsus was born on 31 August 1987 in Nigeria. She currently lives in Austria.

== Career ==
Alphonsus made her screen debut in 2018 with Sudabeh Mortezai's Joy, in which she played the title role. In November 2018, Alphonsus won the award for Best Actress at the Seville International Film Festival. In January 2019, she was awarded the Max Ophüls Prize in Saarbrücken for her role. In the same year, she won the Diagonale Acting Award. In 2020, she won as Best Female Lead at the Austrian Film Award.

In 2022, Alphonsus appeared in the TV series, Das Netz – Prometheus.

== Filmography ==
Year	Film	Role	Genre	Ref.
2018	Joy	Joy	Film	
