= European Film Award for Best Comedy =

- Awarded for: Best European Comedy of the Year
- Presented by: European Film Academy
- First award: 2013
- Final award: 2022
- Website: europeanfilmawards.eu

European Film Award for Best Comedy was first awarded in 2013 by the European Film Academy.

== Winners and nominees ==
=== 2010s ===
| Year | English title | Original title | Director(s) | Country |
|---|---|---|---|---|
| 2013 (26th) | Love Is All You Need | Den skaldede frisør | Susanne Bier | Denmark, France, Sweden, Germany, Italy |
| 2013 (26th) | I'm So Excited | Los amantes pasajeros | Pedro Almodóvar | Spain |
| 2013 (26th) | The Priest's Children | Svećenikova djeca | Vinko Brešan | Croatia, Montenegro, Serbia |
| 2013 (26th) | Welcome Mr. President! | Benvenuto Presidente! | Riccardo Milani | Italy |
| 2014 (27th) | The Mafia Kills Only in the Summer | La mafia uccide solo d'estate | Pierfrancesco Diliberto | Italy |
| 2014 (27th) | Carmina & Amen | Carmina y amén | Paco León | Spain |
| 2014 (27th) | Le Week-End | | Roger Michell | United Kingdom, France |
| 2015 (28th) | A Pigeon Sat on a Branch Reflecting on Existence | En duva satt på en gren och funderade på tillvaron | Roy Andersson | Sweden, Norway, France, Germany |
| 2015 (28th) | The Bélier Family | La Famille Bélier | Éric Lartigau | France |
| 2015 (28th) | The Brand New Testament | Le Tout Nouveau Testament | Jaco Van Dormael | France, Belgium, Luxembourg |
| 2016 (29th) | A Man Called Ove | En man som heter Ove | Hannes Holm | Sweden |
| 2016 (29th) | Look Who's Back | Er ist wieder da | David Wnendt | Germany |
| 2016 (29th) | One Man and His Cow | La Vache | Mohamed Hamidi | France, Algeria |
| 2017 (30th) | The Square | | Ruben Östlund | Sweden, Germany, France, Denmark |
| 2017 (30th) | King of the Belgians | | Peter Brosens and Jessica Woodworth | Belgium, Netherlands, Bulgaria |
| 2017 (30th) | Vincent | | Christophe van Rompaey | Belgium, France |
| 2017 (30th) | Welcome to Germany | Willkommen bei den Hartmanns | Simon Verhoeven | Germany |
| 2018 (31st) | The Death of Stalin | | Armando Iannucci | United Kingdom, France, Belgium |
| 2018 (31st) | C'est la vie! | Le Sens de la fête | Éric Toledano and Olivier Nakache | France |
| 2018 (31st) | Diamantino | | Gabriel Abrantes & Daniel Schmidt | Portugal, France, Brazil |
| 2019 (32nd) | The Favourite | | Yorgos Lanthimos | United Kingdom, Ireland |
| 2019 (32nd) | Tel Aviv on Fire | תל אביב על האש | Sameh Zoabi | Israel, Luxembourg |
| 2019 (32nd) | Ditte & Louise | | Niclas Bendixen | Denmark |

=== 2020s ===
| Year | English title | Original title | Director(s) | Country |
|---|---|---|---|---|
| 2020 (33rd) | The Big Hit | Un triomphe | Emmanuel Courcol | France |
| 2020 (33rd) | Advantages of Travelling by Train | Ventajas de viajar en tren | Aritz Moreno | Spain, France |
| 2020 (33rd) | Ladies of Steel | Teräsleidit | Pamela Tola | Finland |
| 2021 (34th) | Ninjababy | | Yngvild Sve Flikke | Norway |
| 2021 (34th) | The Morning After | Belle fille | Méliane Marcaggi | France |
| 2021 (34th) | The People Upstairs | Sentimental | Cesc Gay | Spain |
| 2022 (35th) | The Good Boss | El buen patrón | Fernando León de Aranoa | Spain |
| 2022 (35th) | Cop Secret | Leynilögga | Hannes Þór Halldórsson | Iceland |
| 2022 (35th) | The Divide | La Fracture | Catherine Corsini | France |

== See also ==
- Golden Globe Award for Best Motion Picture – Musical or Comedy
- Critics' Choice Movie Award for Best Comedy
- Empire Award for Best Comedy
