= If Life Gives You Lemons =

2018 film

- Directed by: Ciro D'Emilio
- Screenplay by: Cosimo Calamini; Ciro D'Emilio
- Starring: Anna Foglietta
- Cinematography: Salvatore Landi
- Edited by: Gianluca Scarpa
- Music by: Bruno Falanga
- Distributed by: No.Mad Entertainment
- Release date: 2018
- Language: Italian

If Life Gives You Lemons (Italian: Un giorno all'improvviso) is a 2018 Italian drama film written and directed by Ciro D'Emilio, in his directorial debut. It premiered at the 75th Venice International Film Festival.

== Cast ==
- Anna Foglietta as Miriam
- Giampiero De Concilio as Antonio Improta
- Massimo De Matteo as Astarita
- Lorenzo Sarcinelli as Stefano Caccialepre
- Biagio Forestieri as Mister Colasanti
- Giuseppe Cirillo as Peppe Lambiase
- Fabio De Caro as Carlo
- Franco Pinelli as Mimmo Rea
- Alessia Quaratino as Claudia

== Production ==
The film was produced by Lungta Film in collaboration with Rai Cinema. It was shot between Naples, Salerno and Scafati.

== Release ==
The film premiered at the 75th edition of the Venice Film Festival, in the Orizzonti sidebar. It was released on Italian cinemas on 29 November 2018.

== Reception ==
For her performance Anna Foglietta won the Nastro d'Argento for best actress and was nominated for the David di Donatello in the same category. The film was awarded the Prix CICAE at the Annecy Italian Film Festival.
