= The Day I Lost My Shadow =

2018 film directed by Soudade Kaadan

- Directed by: Soudade Kaadan
- Screenplay by: Soudade Kaadan
- Starring: Sawsan Arshid
- Cinematography: Éric Devin
- Edited by: Sudad Ka'dan; Pierre Deschamps
- Music by: Kinan Azmeh
- Distributed by: No.Mad Entertainment
- Release date: 2018
- Language: Arabic

The Day I Lost My Shadow (Arabic: يوم أضعت ظلي, romanized: Yawm aḍʿatu ẓillī, French: Le jour où j'ai perdu mon ombre) is a 2018 drama film written and directed by Soudade Kaadan, in her feature directorial debut.

A co-production between Lebanon, France and Qatar, it premiered at the 75th Venice International Film Festival, in which it was awarded the Lion of the Future for best debut film.

== Cast ==
- Sawsan Arshid as Sana
- Samer Ismail as Jalal
- Reham Alkassar as Reem
- Oweiss Mokhallalati as Mahmoud

== Production ==
The film was produced by KAF Production, Acrobates Films and Metaphora Production.

== Release ==
The film premiered at the 75th edition of the Venice Film Festival, in the Orizzonti sidebar, in which it won the Lion of the Future for best debut film. It was also screened at the 43rd Toronto International Film Festival, in the Discovery section.

== Reception ==
On the review aggregator website Rotten Tomatoes, 71% of 7 critics' reviews are positive.
