= Emir Baigazin =

Kazakh actor and film director

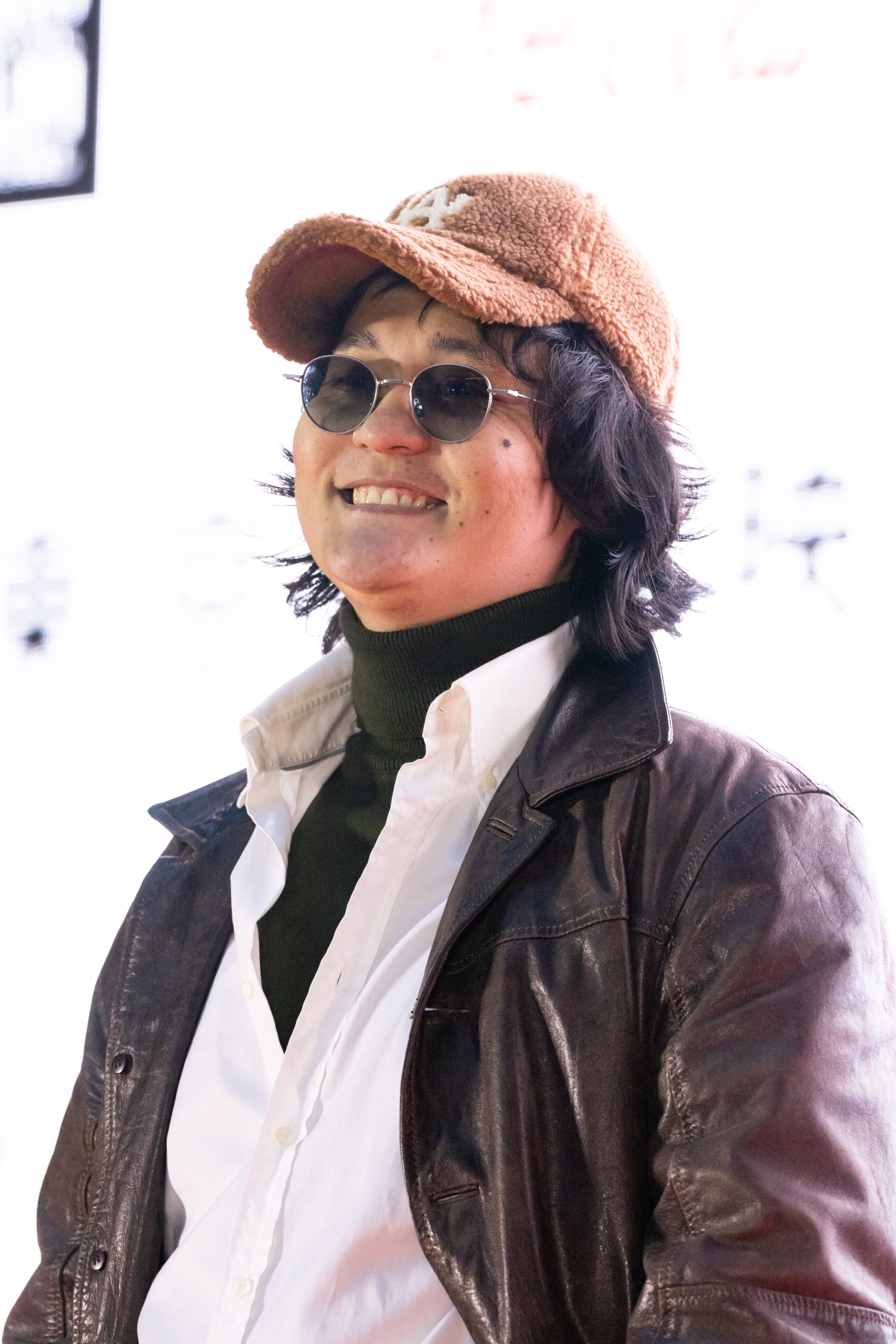
- Baigazin in 2022
- Born: 19 July 1984 (age 41); Tamdy village, Alga District, Kazakhstan

Emir Kenzhegazyuly Baigazin (Kazakh: Эмир Кенжеғазыұлы Байғазин, Emir Kenjeğazyūly Baiğazin; born 19 July 1984) is a Kazakh actor and film director, active in the genres of auteur cinema and art-house.

Emir Kenzhegazyuly Baigazin was born on 19 July 1984 in Tamdy village, Alga District in the Aktobe Province of Kazakh SSR (USSR).

After graduating from high school in Alga (from 2002 to 2004), he studied at the acting school of the T. Akhtanov Aktobe Drama Theater and in 2004 he entered the Kazakh National Academy of Arts, where he specialised in film direction and cinema.

In September 2007, he participated in the Busan International Film Festival, the Asian Film Academy (AFA). In February 2008, he was a member of the Berlin camp of young talent at the 58th Berlin International Film Festival in Germany.

== Filmography ==
=== Acting ===
- 2005 - Day Watch (Дневной Дозор) — young Tamerlan.

=== Directing ===
==== Short films ====
- 2006 - Cheerful and Offended (Russian: Весёлые и обиженные) — screenwriter, director and cameraman.
- 2007 - Steppe (Russian: Степь) — screenwriter, director and cameraman.
- 2007 - Virgins (Russian: Девственники) — screenwriter and director.
- 2007 - Silhouettes of Almaty (Russian: Силуэты Алматы) — producer.
- 2008 - Весогонщик — screenwriter and director.

==== Feature films ====
- 2013 - Harmony Lessons (Kazakh: Асланның сабақтары, Russian: Уроки гармонии). It won the World Cinema Fund prize at the Berlin International Film Festival, and was shown at the Tribeca Film Festival. Baigazin was nominated for the Asia Pacific Screen Award for Achievement in Directing.
- 2016 - The Wounded Angel (Kazakh: Жаралы періште, Russian: Раненый ангел), premiered at the 66th Berlinale (Panorama Special).
- 2018 - The River (Kazakh: Ozen), premiered at the Horizons sections of the 2018 Venice Film Festival.
- 2022 - Life (Kazakh: Жизнь)
