= Blonde Animals =

2018 drama film

- Directed by: Maxime Matray; Alexia Walther
- Screenplay by: Maxime Matray; Alexia Walther
- Starring: Thomas Scimeca
- Cinematography: Simon Beaufils
- Edited by: Martial Salomon; Jeanne Sarfati
- Music by: Maxime Matray
- Release date: 2018
- Language: French

Blonde Animals (French: Bêtes blondes) is a 2018 French comedy-drama film co-written and directed by Maxime Matray and Alexia Walther, at their feature film debut.

The film premiered at the 75th edition of the Venice Film Festival, in the Venice International Critics' Week sidebar, winning the Circolo del Cinema di Verona Award. For his performance, Thomas Scimeca got a César Award nomination for Best Male Revelation.

== Cast ==
- Thomas Scimeca as Fabien
- Basile Meilleurat as Yoni
- Agathe Bonitzer as Katia
- Youssef Hajdi as Johann
- Paul Barge as Ricky
- Anne Rotger as Jacqueline
- Pierre Moure as Arnaud
- Lucille Guillaume as Claire
