= Jonah and the Pink Whale =

- Directed by: Juan Carlos Valdivia
- Written by: José Wolfango Montes Vannuci (book)
- Produced by: Luz María Rojas; Raquel Romero
- Starring: Dino García; María Renée Prudencio; Julieta Egurrola; Guillermo Gil
- Cinematography: Henner Hofmann
- Edited by: Sigfrido Barjau
- Music by: José Stephens
- Production company: Periodistas Asociados Televisión
- Distributed by: IFA
- Release date: 7 September 1995 (TIFF)
- Running time: 93 minutes
- Countries: Mexico; Bolivia
- Language: Spanish

Jonah and the Pink Whale (Spanish: Jonás y la ballena rosada) is a 1995 Mexican-Bolivian co-production film directed by Juan Carlos Valdivia. The film is based on the 1987 novel by José Wolfango Montes Vannuci The film focuses on the relationship of Jonas, a photographer and his romantic relationship with his sister-in-law.

Jonah and the Pink Whale was the Bolivian entry for the Best Foreign Language Film competition in the 68th Academy Awards, but it did not receive an Oscar nomination.

The movie is the first production of Juan Carlos Valdivia, a director from La Paz who for this production adapted the novel of the same name by José Wolfango Montes Vanucci published in 1987. The film has as its protagonist Jonás Larriva, a thirty-year-old reluctant to professional success and harassed by his elitist political family., who will find himself involved in a carnal relationship with his sister-in-law, between hyperinflation and the rise of drug trafficking in eastern Bolivia.

== Plot ==
In 1984, in Santa Cruz de la Sierra, a city affected by the economic crisis and the growth of the drug trafficking industry, Jonás Larriva, a professor married to the daughter of the owner of a funeral home, is a victim of Patroclo's annoying proposals, his father-in-law, to improve his lifestyle, financially. Patroclo offers him to supervise the construction of an Egyptian-themed family mausoleum on the sandhills outside the city, but Jonás rejects the offer to continue as a teacher.

During Jonás's birthday, he meets Julia, his sister-in-law, who is capricious, conceited and rebellious, and does not match the family ideals. The next day, Julia tells her sister and brother-in-law how that morning she had been the victim of an alleged rape. As Jonás comforts her we see the dangerous proximity between him and his sister-in-law, as well as the sexual freedom that emanates from Julia, unlike Talía, her sister.

Jonás is fired from his job as a teacher, supposedly for political reasons, but he assumes it was the influence of Patroclo. Then, one day when he goes down to the basement of the house where he lives with his entire in-laws, Jonás begins to set up a kind of photography studio where Julia suggests that he learn photography. Ira, his mother-in-law, gets him a job at a law firm, trying to get him to abandon the idea of being a photographer.

One day, in the studio, Julia plays with the idea of being photographed. She undresses and challenges Jonás to photograph her. He starts taking polaroids of her and they end up making love. From that moment, the studio becomes the space where their love affair is possible. Between leaks and lights, photos of Julia's naked body hang.

Some old friends visit Jonás in his office. There, he meets Benjamín Grigotá, the son of a former laborer who is now someone with money. Jonás continues his complex affair with Julia, who puts together an album of photographs and condoms of them as a couple. Ira discovers the basement with the photos and sends Julia to the United States, as a punishment, to keep them away. At the law firm they tell Jonas that Patroclo is bankrupt and as proof of this they fire him. Ira violently hands the album to Jonás, acknowledging that he knows about their incestuous relationship and tells him that the next day he will start working on the mausoleum. During Julia's trip, she sends letters and it is known that in the United States she is dating Benjamín Grigotá, the son of a drug trafficker. Upon his return to Bolivia, Patroclus forbids his daughter to continue seeing Grigotá, but Benjamín makes her understand that the couple love each other and that they got married; Patroclo banishes his daughter, but later the drug traffickers negotiate with Patroclo and he practically sells his daughter for money, with which he manages to finish his mausoleum.

Jonás and Julia meet and confess that they still love each other, he proposes fleeing Santa Cruz. But Julia points out that due to her husband's influence it would be impossible, especially without money. Jonás then takes a job as a mule to smuggle drugs across the border for $20,000. He is arrested and tortured, later it is learned that he was used as a decoy to pass the drugs elsewhere. Upon his return, his friends give him his pay and tell him that Grigotá is dead. He asks about Julia and runs out to find the bodies being carried. A torrential rain floods the photo studio and takes Julia's photos to the patio of the house. The familiar resemblance with Jonah fades. Julia is mummified and there is a procession to the pyramid of Patroclo. Jonás is left alone.

== Cast ==
- Jonás Larriva – Dino García
- Julia del Paso y Troncoso – María René Prudencio
- Talía del Paso y Troncoso – Claudia Lobo
- Ira del Paso y Troncoso – Julieta Egurrola
- Patroclo del Paso y Troncoso – Guillermo Gil
- Pablo del Paso – Elías Serrano
- Benjamín Grigotá – Milton Cortez
- Antonio – Juan Claudio Lechín

== Production ==
Jonah and the Pink Whale was produced by Periodistas Asociados Televisión, which at the time was a television production company specializing primarily in news and current affairs programming for existing television channels. Early in its existence in the early 1990s, Juan Carlos Valdivia, brother of Ximena Valdivia, partner of Carlos Mesa, general manager of PAT, appeared at the company. In 1988 Juan Carlos had arrived to Bolivia with a short film under his arm, Transients, which he showed for some of his friends and filmmakers. Mesa's relation with Juan Carlos was initially cold, due to negative reception to the film, but it was later revealed that his talent was undermined. Juan Carlos ended up on "La cena de ATB", a program hosted by Lorenzo Carri.

In 1993 he reappeared at Carlos Mesa's office with a script and the decision to send it to the Ibero-American competition organized by the government of Mexico City and the Foundation of New Latin American Cinema directed by García Márquez. The pre-requisites were a "detailed budget" and a production company that would assure its release. PAT was eventually chosen. At the time, the production company had never produced a theatrical feature film.

Ximena Valdivia periodically sent books by Bolivian authors, so that he would not forget his Bolivian roots while he was studying at Columbia College in Chicago. Among all these novels, Juan Carlos was attracted to the novel of Jonah and the Pink Whale by the author Wolfango Montes Vanucci.

The movie was initially budgeted at US$400,000 per the director's own initiative, but was later raised to US$600,000. Juan Carlos traveled to Mexico in order to receive the Opera Prima award and returned with US$100,000 and a commitment from the Mexican Institute of Cinematography (IMCINE) to contribute an additional 250 thousand dollars for a co-production between the two countries, with Mesa and Juan Carlos atting an additional US$100,000 to a bank account.

On 15 March 1994, filming in "la casona" was ready to start, the old residence of Don Ramón Darío Gutiérrez and the future Museum of History of Santa Cruz, which was selected. Sixteen tons of equipment arrived from an LAB plane that also transported soundproof generating equipment.

CONACINE approved the Jonás project, along with Question of Faith and To Receive the Song of the Birds. A development credit raised the budget. Six weeks later, filming in Lomas de Arena.

The movie was edited in Mexico by Juan Carlos and Sigfrido Barjau. The movie ended up being a launching pad for the careers of actors such as María Renée Prudencio (who was already an actress) and Milton Cortez.

== See also ==
- List of submissions to the 68th Academy Awards for Best Foreign Language Film
- List of Bolivian submissions for the Academy Award for Best Foreign Language Film
