= The Wounded Angel (film) =

2016 film

- Film poster
- Directed by: Emir Baigazin
- Written by: Emir Baigazin
- Produced by: Anna Vilgelmi
- Starring: Nurlybek Saktaganov
- Release date: 16 February 2016 (Berlin)
- Running time: 113 minutes
- Country: Kazakhstan
- Languages: Kazakh; Russian

The Wounded Angel (Kazakh: Жаралы періште, Jaraly perishte; Russian: Раненый ангел) is a 2016 Kazakhstani drama film directed by Emir Baigazin. It was shown in the Panorama section at the 66th Berlin International Film Festival.

== Cast ==
- Nurlybek Saktaganov
- Madiyar Aripbay
- Madiyar Nazarov
- Omar Adilov
- Anzara Barlykova
