= Harmony Lessons =

2013 film

- Film poster
- Directed by: Emir Baigazin
- Written by: Emir Baigazin
- Produced by: Anna Katchko
- Starring: Timur Aidarbekov
- Cinematography: Aziz Zhambakiyev
- Release date: 14 February 2013 (Berlin)
- Running time: 120 minutes
- Countries: Kazakhstan; Germany
- Languages: Kazakh; Russian

Harmony Lessons (Kazakh: Асланның сабақтары, Aslannyñ sabaqtary; Russian: Уроки гармонии) is a 2013 Kazakh-German drama film directed by Emir Baigazin. It was awarded a Silver Bear for Outstanding Artistic Contribution for camera work at the Berlinale in 2013.

== Plot ==
Harmony Lessons is set in a small Kazakhstan village, where Aslan, a thirteen-year-old boy living with his grandmother is a diligent student, bullied by an older boy Bolat and his gang connected with adult criminals and prisoners. The plot concerns Aslan's humiliations, and slow revenge.

== Cast ==
The cast includes:

- Timur Aidarbekov as Aslan
- Aslan Anarbayev as Bolat
- Mukhtar Andassov as Mirsain
- Anelya Adilbekova as Akzhan
- Omar Adilov as Mad
- Adlet Anarbekov as Takhir
- Daulet Anarbekov as Damir
- Nursultan Nurbergenov as Maksat
- Nurdaulet Orazymbetov as Daniyar
- Erasyl Nurzhakyp as Arsen
- Assan Kirkabakov as Shikan
- Ramazan Sultanbek as Gani

== Production ==
Harmony Lessons won the World Cinema Fund Prize in January 2013, becoming first Kazakhstan's project to be supported by the Fund.

== Release and Accolades ==
The film premiered in competition at the 63rd Berlin International Film Festival in 2013 where Aziz Zhambakiyev was awarded for a Silver Bear for Outstanding Artistic Contribution for camera work.

The film was also screened at the Tribeca Film Festival in New York City.

Baygazin was nominated for the Asia Pacific Screen Award for Achievement in Directing for Harmony Lessons.

== Critical reception ==
The film has garnered critical acclaim since its release, consistently receiving praise for its directing, writing, acting, music and cinematography.

Critic Lee Marshall from Screen Daily in his review praised director Baigazin for his direction and script saying "Perhaps the most compelling and original aspect of the film is its dual nature as revenge thriller and magical-realist-tinged rite of passage. That the two strands manage to coexist, most of the time, without undermining each other, is tribute to Baigazin’s finely-tuned script." And went on to also praise the film's cinematography and production design, writing "Shot in a series of carefully composed, fixed-camera shots, with cinematographer and production designer bringing out the pastels and half-tones of landscape and school buildings, Harmony Lessons is as dense with symbols and narrative sideshows as a Kazakh pilaf."

Critic Davis Rooney of The Hollywood Reporter wrote a glowing review where he compared the film to the works of director Gus Van Sant, saying "Grimly poetic, formally disciplined and psychologically gripping, this is a legitimate discovery." And he went on to praise both the acting ("The director gets effective performances out of his non-professional young cast... In the central role, Aidarbekov is especially compelling, keeping his feelings tightly contained aside from a brief explosion in a fantasy shaped by one of his earlier experiments.") and music ("Eschewing non-source music, he establishes a hypnotic rhythm that maintains the drama’s oneiric dimension even through some of its more turbulent developments.") of the film.

In Kristin Tillotson's positive review for the Minneapolis Star Tribune she wrote that "Baigazin's pacing, restraint and eye for depicting both internal and geographic desolation add up to a transfixing tragedy."
