= Red Uno La Paz =

- La Paz; Bolivia
- City: La Paz
- Channels: Digital: 41; Virtual: 11.1
- Branding: Red Uno La Paz

Programming
- Affiliations: 11.1: Red Uno

Ownership
- Owner: Grupo Kuljis (Red Uno de Bolivia S.A.)

History
- Founded: July 1, 1985
- First air date: July 1, 1985
- Former channel number: Analog: 11 (VHF, 1985-2026)
- Former affiliations: Independent (1985-1987); Teleandina (1987-1989)

Technical information
- Licensing authority: ATT

Red Uno La Paz is the Red Uno owned-and-operated station for the city of La Paz, capital of Bolivia. The station operates on VHF channel 11 (digital channel 42, PSIP 11.1) and is an affiliate of Red Uno de Bolivia.

== History ==
On December 12, 1984, Dirección General de Telecomunicaciones issued Administrative Resolution Nº. 64/84 to Hugo Roncal Antezana to install Teleandina, a VHF commercial television station on channel 11, in provisional status. This depended on technical requirements and a report set by the regulator, which was not achieved due to the fact that its facilities were not finished yet, following the elapsing of a 90-day period. Its provisional license was expanded on April 16, 1985 by means of Administrative Resolution Nº. 29/85, which was subsequently annulled.

The station started broadcasting as an independent station, Teleandina, on July 1, 1985, with broadcasts from Monday to Friday at 6:00 p.m. and on weekends at 5:00 pm., being owned by brothers Mario and Hugo Roncal. "Regular definitive" broadcasts did not start until August 5, 1985 with the passing of Ministerial Resolution Nº. 4496 from the Minister of Transports and Communications. At the time the channel broadcast pirated content from other countries, a recurrent practice in early private television stations. Back then, filmmaker Hugo Roncal was the channel's general manager. In 1987 the transmitting antenna changed and Teveandina expanded its broadcast schedules starting at 11:00 a.m. from Monday to Friday and at 6:00 a.m. on Sundays. Teleandina's studio was located in the center of the city and they moved to Miraflores first and to Sopocachi at the end of the 1980s, thus broadcasting regularly since November 24, 1988, months after the station was legalized, on May 6.

Before adopting the Red Uno branding, Teleandina broadcast on channel 11 in Oruro, 13 in Santa Cruz, 6 (later 9) in Cochabamba (channel 2 CCA Corazón de América is relayed some programs of its programs), 11 in La Paz and had repeater stations throughout the country. In November 2010, it announced the digitalization of its technical head-end.

On February 21, 2022, Red Uno La Paz inaugurated its studios in the adjacent city of El Alto.
