= Kais Nashef =

Israeli actor

Kais Nashef قيس ناشف
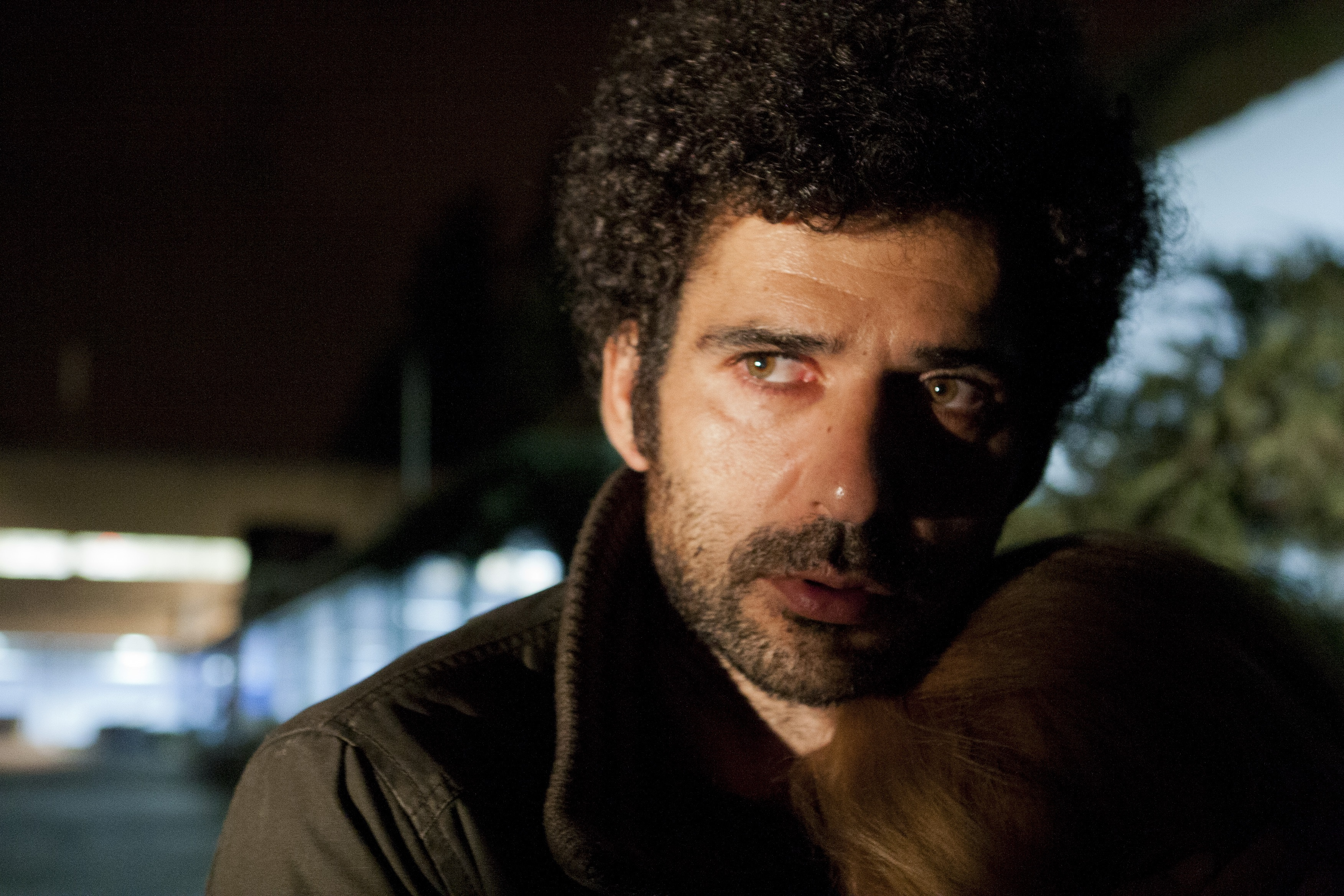
- Nashef in Happiness Wrapped in a Blanket, 2014
- Born: 1978 (age 47–48); Tayibe, Israel
- Citizenship: Israel; Germany

Kais Nashef (Arabic: قيس ناشف; Hebrew: קאיס נאשף; born 1978) is an Israeli actor.

== Early life and education ==
Nashef was born in Tayibe, Israel, and is of both Palestinian and German descent. He studied acting at the Beit Zvi Institute of Performing Arts in Ramat Gan. He lives in Berlin.

== Career ==
He later played the lead role in Paradise Now, a film about two would-be suicide bombers in the West Bank. In 2018, he won the best actor award at the Venice Film Festival for his role in Tel Aviv on Fire.

== Filmography ==
Year	Title	Role	Notes
2005	Paradise Now	Said	
2005	Allenbi Romance		
2006	The Nativity Story	Benjamin	
2006	Djihad	Lugman	TV movie
2006-2009	Parashat Ha-Shavua	Amir El Nashaf	TV series, 35 episodes
2008	AmericanEast	Omar	
2008	Body of Lies	Mustafa Karami	
2008	Winds of Sand	Militant	
2009	Die Seele eines Mörders	Ya'ir	TV movie
2012	Habibi	Qays	
2012-2015	Ananda		TV series, co-write
2013	Big Bad Wolves	man on horseback	
2014	Happiness Wrapped in a Blanket	Bashir	
2016	looking for um kolthoum		
2017	Tel Aviv on Fire	Salam	Venice Film Festival (Horizons) Best Actor
2020	Limbo	Nabil	
2020	Abu Omar	Saleh	
