= Tel Aviv on Fire =

2018 Israeli comedy drama film

- Theatrical release poster
- תל אביב על האש
- Directed by: Sameh Zoabi
- Written by: Dan Kleinman; Sameh Zoabi
- Produced by: Bernard Michaux (producer); Amir Harel; Milena Poylo; Gilles Sacuto; Patrick Quinet
- Starring: Kais Nashef
- Cinematography: Laurent Brunet
- Release date: September 2, 2018 (Venice Film Festival)
- Running time: 95 minutes
- Countries: Israel; Luxembourg; Belgium; France
- Languages: Hebrew; Arabic
- Box office: $1.7 million

Tel Aviv on Fire (Hebrew: תל אביב על האש, Tel Aviv Al Ha'Esh) is a 2018 satirical comedy-drama film directed by Sameh Zoabi and co-written by Zoabi and Dan Kleinman. The film premiered internationally at the 75th Venice International Film Festival in the Orizzonti section, where Kais Nashef won the Best Actor award. The Israeli premiere was at the Haifa International Film Festival, where the film won the Best Film and Best Screenplay awards. It was selected as the Luxembourgish entry for the Best International Feature Film at the 92nd Academy Awards, but it was not nominated.

== Plot ==
Salem (Kais Nashef), a Palestinian from East Jerusalem, is a low-level production assistant on the soap opera Tel Aviv on Fire in Ramallah. The show, which is popular with both Palestinians and Israelis, tells the story of a Palestinian spy who falls in love with an IDF officer. Asi (Yaniv Biton), who staffs the checkpoint Salem must pass through every day to get to work, tells Salem that the show's military dialogue is unrealistic, and writes his own script. Salem uses Asi's dialogue in the show, which impresses the producers and the star, Tala (Lubna Azabal), and leads to Salem being suddenly promoted to fulltime screenwriter. There is only one problem: Salem cannot write screenplays, and must quickly learn.

To avoid getting fired, Salem makes a deal with Asi, who helps him write in exchange for fine Palestinian hummus, and a promise that the series' plot will end with a wedding. Salem convinces the producers to conclude the show's season with a wedding, but the Palestinian investors demand that the spy sets off a bomb at the wedding, killing herself, the IDF officer, and his comrades.

Salem gets himself out of this bind by having Asi appear in the show as a character who breaks up the wedding before the bomb is detonated. This enables Tel Aviv on Fire to have a second season and Salem to remain employed. His continuing employment also resolves a secondary plotline where he is trying to win back his girlfriend, Maryam (Maisa Abd Alhady), who accuses him of being unreliable and unable to keep a job.

== Cast ==
Name	Role	Details
Kais Nashef	Salem Abbas	Soap opera production assistant
Yaniv Biton	Asi Tsur	Israeli checkpoint officer
Maisa Abd Alhady	Maryam	Salem's ex-girlfriend
Lubna Azabal	Tala	Soap actress, playing the role of Palestinian spy Manal/Rachel
Yousef Sweid	Karim	Soap actor, playing the role of the Israeli General, Yehuda Edelman
Salim Dau	Atef	Director of Tel Aviv on Fire
Nadim Sawalha	Bassem	Salem's uncle and producer of Tel Aviv on Fire
Amer Hlehel	Nabil	Scriptwriter on Tel Aviv on Fire
Laëtitia Eïdo	Maisa	Wardrobe assistant and aspiring soap star

== Reception ==
=== Box office ===
Tel Aviv on Fire grossed $0.5 million in North America and $1.2 million in other territories, for a worldwide total of $1.7 million.

=== Critical response ===
On review aggregator Rotten Tomatoes, the film holds an approval rating of 90% based on 61 reviews, with an average rating of 6.8/10. The website's critical consensus reads, "Thoughtful and well-acted, Tel Aviv on Fire highlights the awful absurdity of war -- and proves it's possible to find humor in the midst of cultural conflict." On Metacritic, the film has a normalized score of 70 out of 100, based on 16 critics, indicating "generally favorable reviews".

=== Awards ===
Year	Award	Category	Nominee	Result	Notes
2018	Venice Film Festival	Best Actor (Orizzonti section)	Kais Nashef	Won	
2018	Haifa International Film Festival	Best Film	Tel Aviv on Fire	Won	
2018	Haifa International Film Festival	Best Screenplay	Samah Zouabi	Won	
2018	Toronto International Film Festival	World Contemporary Cinema	Tel Aviv on Fire	Nominated	
2018	Asian Pacific Screen Awards	Best Screenplay	Dan Kleinman and Sameh Zoabi	Won	
2019	Seattle International Film Festival	Best Film	Tel Aviv on Fire	Won	
2019	Israeli Academy Awards	Best Narrative Film	Tel Aviv on Fire	Nominated	
2019	Israeli Academy Awards	Best Supporting Actor	Yaniv Biton	Nominated	
2019	Israeli Academy Awards	Best Original Screenplay	Sameh Zoabi	Won	
2019	Israeli Academy Awards	Best Casting	Galit Eshkol	Nominated	
2019	European Film Academy Award	Best European Comedy	Tel Aviv on Fire	Nominated	
2020	Magritte Award	Best Foreign Film in Coproduction	Tel Aviv on Fire	Nominated	
2020	Magritte Award	Best Actress	Lubna Azabal	Nominated	

== Production ==
The film is a Luxembourg-Israel-France-Belgium co-production, and received funding from the Luxembourg Film Fund, the Israel Film Fund, YES Israeli Films, Gesher Multicultural Film Fund and Mifal Hapais.

== See also ==
- List of submissions to the 92nd Academy Awards for Best International Feature Film
- List of Luxembourgish submissions for the Academy Award for Best International Feature Film
