= Sameh Zoabi =

Film writer and director

- سامح زعبي
- Born: Iksal, Israel
- Education: Tel Aviv University (BA); Columbia University (MFA)
- Occupations: Director, screenwriter
- Employer: New York University
- Notable work: Tel Aviv on Fire

Sameh Zoabi (Arabic: سامح زعبي, Hebrew: סמאח זועבי) is a Palestinian Israeli film writer and director best known for his 2019 film Tel Aviv on Fire.

== Childhood and education ==
Zoabi grew up in Iksal, a village near Nazareth, Israel. His father is a farmer. He studied at Tel Aviv University, graduating with a dual degree in film studies and literature. He then attended Columbia University on a Fulbright scholarship, receiving his MFA in 2005.

Zoabi lives in Brooklyn and teaches at New York University.

== Career ==
Zoabi made Be Quiet, a short film, in 2005. His feature length debut was Man Without a Cell Phone (2010). He won Best Screenplay Award at 12th Asia Pacific Screen Awards for Tel Aviv on Fire (2019). The movie was also nominated for a 2019 European Film Award for Best Comedy and was Luxembourg's submission to the 92nd Academy Awards for Best International Feature Film.
