= Joy (2018 film) =

2018 film

- Directed by: Sudabeh Mortezai
- Written by: Sudabeh Mortezai
- Starring: Anwulika Alphonsus; Mariam Sanusi; Angela Ekeleme
- Distributed by: Netflix
- Release dates: September 3, 2018 (Venice Film Festival); January 18, 2019
- Running time: 109 minutes
- Country: Austria
- Languages: English; German; Nigerian Pidgin

Joy is a 2018 Austrian drama film directed and written by Sudabeh Mortezai. The plot revolves around Joy (Anwulika Alphonsus), a young Nigerian woman who walks the streets to pay off debts while also supporting her family in Nigeria and her daughter in Vienna.

It was selected as the Austrian entry for the Best International Feature Film at the 92nd Academy Awards. However, the film was disqualified in November 2019, with the Academy stating that the film had too much dialogue in English. The filmmakers disputed the disqualification, arguing that when the parts of the dialogue in Nigerian Pidgin that are unintelligible to English speakers are counted separately from English, English constitutes less than 50% of the entire dialogue and thus the film should be eligible, but the Academy stood by its initial decision.

== Premise ==
Joy is a young Nigerian woman doing sex work to pay off debts while supporting her family in Nigeria and her daughter in Vienna. She’s instructed to supervise Precious, a new teenage girl from Nigeria about to go down the same path as her.

== Accolades ==
Joy had its premiere on 30 August 2018 as part of the 75th Venice Film Festival. The film was later invited to the Giornate degli Autori section and was screened and awarded at several international film festivals.

== Cast ==
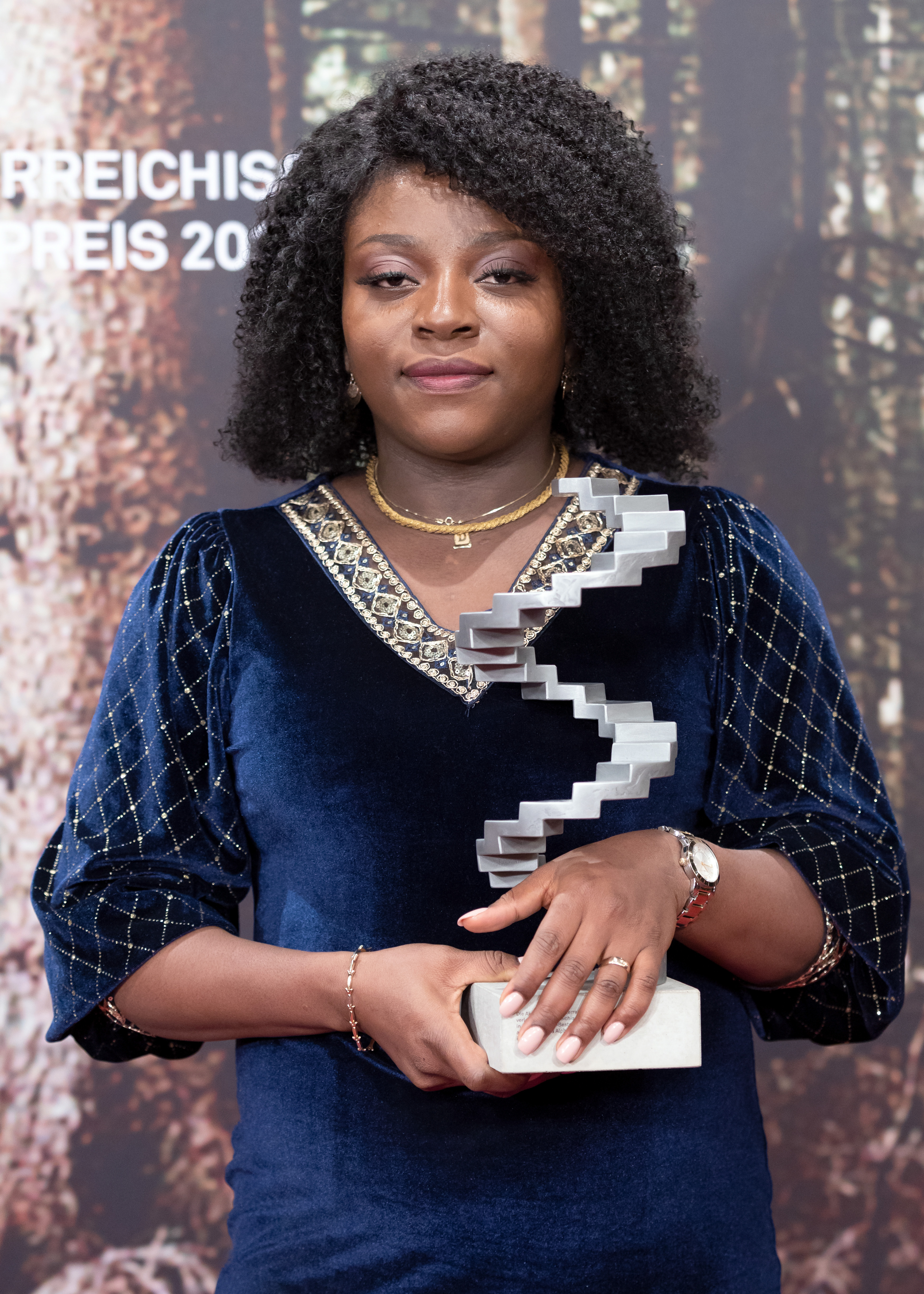
Anwulika Alphonsus with her Best Female Lead trophy at the 2020 Austrian Film Award

- Anwulika Alphonsus as Joy
- Mariam Sanusi as Precious
- Angela Ekeleme as Madame

== Release ==
It was released on January 18, 2019 on Netflix streaming.

== See also ==
- List of submissions to the 92nd Academy Awards for Best International Feature Film
- List of Austrian submissions for the Academy Award for Best International Feature Film
