= Sudabeh Mortezai =

Austro-Iranian filmmaker

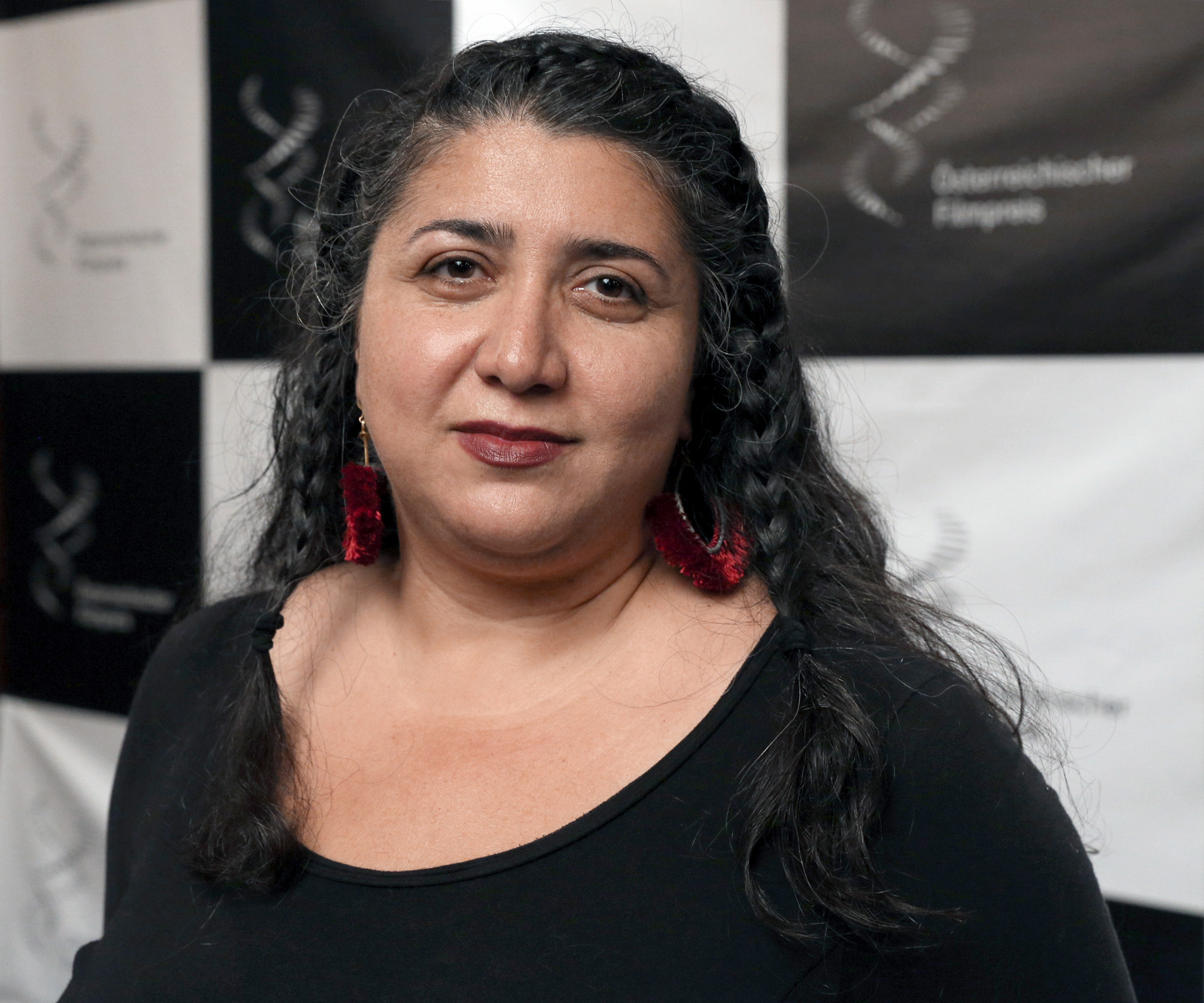
- Born: 1968 (age 57–58); Ludwigsburg, West Germany (now Germany)
- Occupations: Director, producer, screenwriter
- Years active: 2006–present

Sudabeh Mortezai (born 1968), is an Austrian–Iranian filmmaker and producer. She is best known as the director of critically acclaimed films Macondo and Joy, which won several awards at international film festivals.

== Personal life ==
She was born on 1968 in Ludwigsburg, Germany to Iranian parents. She spent her childhood and youth in Vienna and Tehran.

== Career ==
She moved to Vienna and studied theater, film and media. Then she studied film at University of California, Los Angeles (UCLA) in Los Angeles. During this period, she made various short and documentary films including 2006 documentary Children of the Prophet. It focuses on Iranian mourning rituals for Imam Hossein, the Prophet Mohammad’s grandson.

In 2009, she made Im Bazar der Gender which describes the widespread practice of temporary marriage in Shiite Islam. Later in 2014, she made her maiden feature film Macondo. The film is the portrait of a Chechen refugee boy. It was invited to the 64th Berlin International Film Festival (Berlinale competition), and competed for Golden Bear Award.

After the success of the film, she made her second feature film Joy in 2018. It revolves around the story of a Nigerian woman on a voyage to find freedom. The film received critical acclaim and won several awards at different international film festivals. The film was invited to the 75th Venice Film Festival in the section Giornate degli Autori. Then she won the Europa Cinemas Label as Best European Film in the Giornate degli Autori section of the Venice Film Festival. In the meantime, she co-founded the film production company 'FreibeuterFilm'. The film also won the first Hearst Film Award for Best Female Director.

In October 2018, the film won the award for the Best Film at BFI London Film Festival. At 54th Chicago International Film Festival, the film won Silver Hugo Special Jury Award. Then in December 2018, the film received the Golden Star for best film at the Marrakech International Film Festival

== Filmography ==
Year	Film	Role	Genre	Ref.
2006	Children of the Prophet	Director, writer	Documentary	
2009	Im Bazar der Geschlechter	Director, writer	Documentary	
2014	Macondo	Director, writer	Film	
2018	Joy	Director, writer	Film	
2023	Europa	Director, writer	Film	
