= John Thomas Perceval =

British army officer (1803–1876)

John Thomas Perceval (14 February 1803 – 28 February 1876) was a British army officer who was confined in lunatic asylums for three years and spent the rest of his life campaigning for reform of the lunacy laws and for better treatment of asylum inmates. He was one of the founders of the Alleged Lunatics' Friend Society and acted as their honorary secretary for about twenty years. Perceval's two books about his experience in asylums were republished by anthropologist Gregory Bateson in 1962, and in recent years he has been hailed as a pioneer of the mental health advocacy movement.

== Early life ==
Perceval was born into the ruling elite of the United Kingdom in 1803. His father Spencer Perceval, a son of the 2nd Earl of Egmont, was a lawyer and politician who became prime minister in 1809. Perceval was the tenth of thirteen children (of whom twelve survived infancy). When Perceval was nine his father was shot dead in the lobby of the House of Commons. The assassin, John Bellingham, was a merchant with a grievance against the government and was widely believed to be insane (although at his trial he pleaded injustice rather than insanity and was executed). Press reports described how one of the Perceval boys had been in Parliament and had seen his father's body moments after the shooting, and a psychoanalyst has suggested that this child was Perceval and that witnessing the scene may have been the cause of his subsequent regressive experience. Perceval himself recognised the loss of his father - along with mercury poisoning and over-study of religion - as a contributory factor in his breakdown.

Perceval attended Harrow School and spent a year with a private tutor before obtaining an army commission, first in a cavalry regiment and then as a captain in the First Foot or Grenadier Guards. Much of his army career was spent on tours of duty in Portugal and Ireland; he did not see combat. A sober and religious man, Perceval felt increasingly out of place in the army and, in 1830, sold his commission and enrolled at Hertford College, Oxford. Although he found university life more to his liking than the army, Perceval did not return for a second term in the autumn of 1830. Instead he embarked on a spiritual journey to Scotland, visiting a radical evangelical sect at Row who spoke in tongues and were said to perform miracles. Perceval came to believe he was guided by the holy spirit. He left Scotland to visit friends in Ireland, where he became disillusioned with religion, had sex with a prostitute, and was treated with mercury for a sexually transmitted infection. At this stage - it was December 1830 and he was 27 years old - his behaviour became so bizarre that his friends had him restrained and his eldest brother Spencer came to take him back to England and put him in a lunatic asylum.

== "Narrative of the treatment of a gentleman" ==
After the murder of Perceval's father, Parliament had voted the family a sum of money of over £50,000. It enabled Perceval's mother, who was his guardian when he became insane, to have him confined in two of England's most expensive private asylums. He spent about a year at Brislington House, Brislington near Bristol, followed by two years at Ticehurst House, Ticehurst in Sussex. In Brislington Asylum Perceval experienced, in spite of the expense, a regime of deprivation, brutality and degradation. For eight months, during which time he was completely under the control of his voices, spirits and presences, he was kept under restraint, either in a straitjacket or tied down in bed. Treatment consisted of cold baths and an operation to sever his temporal artery. When his reason began to return he was allowed more freedom and he eventually persuaded his mother to take him away from Brislington House. He was taken to Ticehurst Asylum, where he was treated better. Perceval spent his time in Ticehurst Asylum trying to obtain his release, something he finally achieved in early 1834. One of his first actions on release was to marry Anna Lesley Gardner, a cheesemonger's daughter, who was described by his family as "quite out of his station in life". The couple were to have four daughters:

- Jane Beatrice, 1835–1893.
- Alice Frederica, 1836–1941.
- Selina Maria, 1838–1925, married her cousin Sir Horatio George Walpole, assistant under-secretary of state for India.
- Fanny Louisa Charlotta, 1845–1862.

Perceval and his wife then went to Paris, where their two eldest daughters were born. In Paris Perceval started working on a book about his experiences. It was published in 1838 under the title "A narrative of the treatment experienced by a Gentleman during a state of mental derangement designed to explain the causes and nature of insanity, and to expose the injudicious conduct pursued towards many unfortunate sufferers under that calamity." The book begins:

"In the year 1830, I was unfortunately deprived of the use of my reason. This calamity befel me about Christmas. I was then in Dublin. The Almighty allowed my mind to become a ruin under sickness - delusions of a religious nature and treatment contrary to nature. My soul survived that ruin."

It goes on to give a brief account of Perceval's early life, and then covers his treatment in Edward Long Fox's asylum at Brislington, ending with Fox's parting words "Goodbye Mr ---, I wish I could give you hopes of recovery".

Although the Narrative was published anonymously, there were clues to the author's identity, and it was given away by the Edinburgh Review. So Perceval decided to publish another volume, this time under his own name, describing how he fought to obtain his freedom while confined in Ticehurst Asylum, and including correspondence with his family and others that his publisher, Effingham Wilson, had persuaded him to leave out of the first volume. The second volume was published in 1840.

== Recovery and campaign work ==
Perceval spent the rest of his life campaigning for the reform of the lunacy laws and for better treatment of asylum inmates, once referring to himself as "the attorney general of Her Majesty's madmen". He joined a small group of ex-inmates, their relatives and supporters to form the Alleged Lunatic's Friend Society in 1845. The following year he became their honorary secretary and remained in this position until the Society ceased to function about twenty years later. The aims of the Society, as set out in their first annual report, were to protect people from wrongful confinement or cruel and improper treatment, and bring about reform of the law. The Society campaigned via Parliament, the courts, local magistrates and public meetings and lectures. They took up the cases of over 70 patients and exposed abuses in a number of asylums, including Bethlem Hospital, and asylums in Northampton and Gloucester.

Perceval combined "public agitation" with "private philanthropy to individual patients". Patients he helped included the German academic Edward Peithman who had been locked up in Bethlem for 14 years after annoying Prince Albert. Perceval obtained his provisional release and took him home to Herne Bay. When Peithman was detained again after another attempt to approach Prince Albert, Perceval once more secured his release and accompanied him to Germany (a condition of his release). Perceval befriended another Bethlem inmate, surgeon Arthur Legent Pearce, and published a volume of his poetry. As well as publishing books and pamphlets on asylums, Perceval published a pamphlet criticising the new Poor Law and was elected to the Kensington Board of Guardians, a position which gave him access to asylums. He also delivered lectures; 1 May 1854 at the Kings Arms Tavern in Kensington High Street he addressed 24 respectable-looking people and an undercover policeman on the need for reform of the lunacy laws.

In 1859, after many years of petitioning the government, the Alleged Lunatic's Friend Society finally achieved one of its main aims, a parliamentary hearing. Perceval gave evidence to the select committee on the care and treatment of lunatics on 11 July 1859. His brother-in-law and cousin, Spencer Horatio Walpole, was in the chair (one of Perceval's daughters would later marry one of Walpole's sons). Perceval argued for: better protection against wrongful confinement and medical experiments; safeguards on invasive treatment without consent; abolition of private asylums; greater rights for patients; more say for patients in decisions about their treatment; a better class of attendants in asylums; freedom of correspondence for patients; and greater involvement of clergy in asylums. To the disappointment of the Society, the select committee did not result in new legislation, and the Society appears to have lost its impetus in the following years. Writing to the John Bull magazine in 1862, about abuses in asylums, Perceval said the Society was lacking support and in disarray. Nothing more is heard of the Society. The cause for lunacy law reform was taken up by Louisa Lowe's Lunacy Law Reform Association, which had similar aims to the Alleged Lunatic's Friend Society. A letter to William Ewart Gladstone in 1868 about Ireland appears to be Perceval's last publication. He died in Munster House asylum in 1876 aged 73 and is buried in Kensal Green Cemetery.

== Legacy ==
Perceval was rediscovered when anthropologist Gregory Bateson published an edited version of the two volumes of the Narrative in 1962, under the title Perceval's narrative: a patient's account of his psychosis 1830-32. This was followed by an article by psychiatrists Richard A. Hunter and Ida Macalpine who concentrated on Perceval's activism, describing him as someone who "played a significant role at a crucial period in psychiatric history by his fearless and honest exposure of himself as well as what he considered the shortcomings of his time" and whose work was "prophetic in the accuracy of its prevision of present-day developments in mental health policy". It may have taken decades - sometimes more than a century - but many of the changes Perceval called for in evidence to the select committee 150 years ago were eventually legislated for. Perceval's Narrative continues to be studied by those interested in what it reveals about psychosis and recovery; whilst his activism has been inspirational for the peer advocacy movement.

== See also ==
- Psychiatric survivors movement
- Hearing Voices Movement
