= Alleged Lunatics' Friend Society =

Advocacy group campaigning for better treatment of asylum patients

1851 Society report

The Alleged Lunatics' Friend Society was an advocacy group started by former asylum patients and their supporters in 19th-century Britain. The Society campaigned for greater protection against wrongful confinement or cruel and improper treatment, and for reform of the lunacy laws. The Society is recognised today as a pioneer of the psychiatric survivors movement.

== Background ==
There was concern in the United Kingdom in the 19th century about wrongful confinement in private madhouses, or asylums, and the mistreatment of patients, with tales of such abuses appearing in newspapers and magazines. The Madhouses Act 1774 had introduced a process of certification and a system for licensing and inspecting private madhouses, but had been ineffectual in reducing abuses or allaying public anxiety. Doctors in the 19th century were establishing themselves as arbiters of sanity but were reliant on subjective diagnoses and tended to equate insanity with eccentric or immoral behaviour. Public suspicion of their motives was also aroused by the profits that were made from private madhouses.

In 1838, Richard Paternoster, a former civil servant in the East India Company, was discharged after 41 days in a London madhouse (William Finch's madhouse at Kensington House) having been detained following a disagreement with his father over money. Once free, he published, via his solicitors, a letter in The Times announcing his release. The letter was read by John Perceval, a son of prime minister Spencer Perceval. Perceval had spent three years in two of the most expensive private asylums in England, Brislington House in Bristol, run by Quaker Edward Long Fox, and Ticehurst Asylum in Sussex. His treatment had been brutal in the Brislington House; at Ticehurst the regime was more humane but his release had been delayed. Perceval contacted Paternoster and they were soon joined by several former patients and others: William Bailey (an inventor and business man who had spent several years in madhouses); Lewis Phillips (a glassware manufacturer who had been incarcerated in Thomas Warburton's asylum); John Parkin (a surgeon and former asylum patient); Captain Richard Saumarez (whose father was the surgeon Richard Saumarez and whose two brothers were Chancery lunatics); and Luke James Hansard (a philanthropist from the family of parliamentary printers). This group was to form the core of the Alleged Lunatics' Friend Society, although the Society would not be formally founded until 1845.

The group began their campaign by sending letters to the press, lobbying Members of Parliament (MPs) and government officials, and publishing pamphlets. John Perceval was elected to the Board of Poor Law Guardians in the parish of Kensington (although he was opposed to the New Poor Law) and was able to join magistrates on their visits of inspection to asylums. Richard Paternoster and Lewis Phillips brought court cases against the people who had incarcerated them. John Perceval published two books about his experience. Richard Paternoster wrote a series of articles for The Satirist magazine; these were published in 1841 as a book called The Madhouse System.

== Formation ==
On 7 July 1845, Richard Paternoster, John Perceval and a number of others formed the Alleged Lunatics' Friend Society. A pamphlet published in March the following year set out the aims with which the Society was founded:

At a meeting of several Gentlemen feeling deeply interested in behalf of their fellow-creatures, subjected to confinement as lunatic patients.

It was unanimously resolved: ... That this Society is formed for the protection of the British subject from unjust confinement, on the grounds of mental derangement, and for the redress of persons so confined; also for the protection of all persons confined as lunatic patients from cruel and improper treatment. That this Society will receive applications from persons complaining of being unjustly treated, or from their friends, aid them in obtaining legal advice, and otherwise assist and afford them all proper protection.

That the Society will endeavour to procure a reform in the laws and treatment affecting the arrest, detention, and release of persons treated as of unsound mind...

John Perceval was listed as the honorary secretary, Luke James Hansard as treasurer, and Henry F. Richardson as honorary solicitor (Gilbert Bolden would later become the Society's lawyer). Sixteen vice-presidents included both Tory and Liberal MPs; notable amongst them was the radical MP for Finsbury, Thomas Duncombe. New legislation, championed by Lord Ashley, was being introduced in parliament (the Lunacy Act 1845 and County Asylums Act 1845) and the creation of a formal society put the group in a better position to influence legislators. Four days after the Society was founded Thomas Duncombe spoke in the House of Commons, arguing for the postponement of new legislation pending a select committee of inquiry, and detailing a number of cases of wrongful confinement that had come to the Society's attention. The legislation however went ahead, and the Society would have to wait until 1859 for an inquiry, although the Society's supporters in parliament managed to secure a number of clauses to safeguard patients in the 1845 Act.

Although the Society had influential supporters such as Thomas Duncombe and Thomas Wakley (surgeon, radical MP for Finsbury and coroner), they did not gain widespread public support, probably never having more than sixty members and relying upon their own money for funding. A critical article in The Times of 1846 revealed the views and prejudices that the Society would have to counter:

We can scarcely understand what such a society can propose to accomplish ... There have been, no doubt, many cases of grievous oppression in which actual lunatics have been treated with cruelty, and those who are only alleged to be insane have been most unlawfully imprisoned ... These, however, are evils to be checked by the law and not tampered with ... by a body of private individuals ... Some of the names we have seen announced suggest to us the possibility that the promoters of this scheme are not altogether free from motives of self-preservation. There is no objection to a set of gentlemen joining together in this manner for their own protection ... but we think they should be satisfied to take care of themselves, without tendering their services to all who happen to be in the same position.

John Perceval replied that the law afforded patients insufficient protection, and that the Society existed to give legal advice to individuals and draw the government's attention to abuses as well as to encourage a more general discussion about the nature of insanity. In response to the article's reference to the fact that several members of the Society had been patients in asylums, Perceval had this to say:

I would remind the writer of that article, that men are worthy of confidence in the province of their own experience, and as the wisest and best of mankind hold the tenure of their health and reasoning faculties on the will of an Inscrutable Providence, and great wits to madness are allied, he will do well to consider that their fate may be his own, and to assist them in saving others in future from like injustice and cruelties, which the ignorance of the fondest relations may expose patients to, as well as the malice of their enemies.

Social worker Nicholas Hervey, who has written the most extensive history of the Alleged Lunatics' Friend Society, suggested that a number of factors may have contributed to the lack of wider public support, namely: alignment with radical political circles; endorsement of localist views, rather than support of the Lunacy Commission's centralism; fearless exposure of upper-class sensibilities regarding privacy on matters concerning insanity, thus alienating wealthy potential supporters; attacks on the new forms of moral treatment in asylums (what John Perceval referred to as "repression by mildness and coaxing").

== Achievements ==
As well as lobbying parliament and campaigning through the media and public meetings, during the next twenty years or so the Society took up the cases of at least seventy patients, including the following examples:

- Dr Edward Peithman was a German tutor who had been falsely imprisoned in Bethlem Hospital for fourteen years after he had tried to gain access to Prince Albert. John Perceval took up his case and, after the Commissioners in Lunacy released him in February 1854, took him home with him to Herne Bay. Dr Peithman promptly tried to speak to Prince Albert again, and was committed to Hanwell Asylum. Again Perceval obtained his release, this time escorting him back to Germany.
- Jane Bright was a member of a wealthy Leicestershire family, the Brights of Skeffington Hall. She was seduced by a doctor who took most of her money and left her pregnant. Soon after the birth of her child, her brothers had her committed to Northampton Hospital. On her release she enlisted Gilbert Bolden, the Society's solicitor, to help her recover the remains of her fortune from her family.
- Anne Tottenham was a Chancery lunatic who was removed from the garden of Effra Hall Asylum in Brixton by Admiral Saumarez. This course of action was a rare exception to the Society's more usual rule of following legal routes to secure the release of patients who had been wrongly confined.
- Charles Verity was serving a two-year prison sentence when he was transferred to Northampton Hospital. He contacted John Perceval in 1857 about abuses in the refractory ward and the Society secured an inquiry.396 The Commissioners in Lunacy reported in 1858 that charges of cruelty and ill-usage had been established against attendants and the culprits had been dismissed.

Not all the Society's cases were successful:

- James Hill (father of Octavia Hill) was a Wisbech corn merchant, banker, proprietor of the newspaper the Star of the East and founder of the United Advancement Society. He had been declared bankrupt and had been committed to Kensington House Asylum. After his release in 1851 the Society helped him sue the proprietor of Kensington House, Dr Francis Philps, for wrongful confinement but the case was unsuccessful.
- Captain Arthur Childe, son of William Lacon Childe, MP, of Kinlet Hall in Shropshire, was a Chancery lunatic who had been found to be of unsound mind by a lunacy inquisition in 1854. The Society applied on his behalf for another lunacy inquisition in 1855, claiming he was now of sound mind. The Society was unsuccessful; the jury found Captain Childe to be of unsound mind and there was a quarrel about costs.

The Society was successful in drawing attention to abuses in a number of asylums. Notable amongst these was Bethlem Hospital, which, as a charitable institution, had been exempt from inspection under the 1845 Lunacy Act. The help of the Society was enlisted by patients and they persuaded the home secretary to allow the Commissioners in Lunacy to inspect the asylum. The Commissioner's critical report in 1852 led to reforms. Together with magistrate Purnell Bransby Purnell, the Society ran a campaign to expose abuses in asylums in Gloucestershire.

One of the aims of the Society had always been to persuade parliament to conduct a committee of inquiry into the lunacy laws. This, after numerous petitions, they finally achieved in 1859. John Perceval, Admiral Saumarez, Gilbert Bolden and Anne Tottenham (a patient they had rescued from Effra House Asylum) gave evidence to the committee. The results were disappointing; the committee made a number of recommendations in their 1860 report but these were not put into place.

== Legacy ==
The Society's activities appear to have come to an end in 1860s. Admiral Saumarez died in 1866, and Gilbert Bolden had a young family and moved to Birmingham. In 1862 John Perceval wrote a letter to the magazine John Bull:

I am sorry to say that this Society is so little supported, in spite of the great good it has done, and is in consequence so entirely disorganised, that I have repeatedly proposed to the committee that we should agree to a dissolution of it, and I have only consented to continue acting with them, and to lend my name to what is rather a myth than a reality, from their representation that however insignificant we were, we had still been able to effect a great deal of good, and might still be further successful

Nicholas Hervey concluded:

The Society's importance lies in the wide panorama of ideas it laid before Shaftesbury's Board. Unrestrained by the traditions of bureaucratic office, it was free to explore a variety of alternatives for care of the insane, many of which were too visionary or impolitic to stand a chance of implementation. The difficulty it faced was the blinkered perspective of the Commission and of Shaftesbury in particular ... it would not be an exaggeration of the Society's worth to say that patients' rights, asylum care, and medical accountability all suffered with its demise in the 1860s.

The cause for lunacy law reform was taken up by Louisa Lowe's Lunacy Law Reform Association, whose aims were very similar to those of the Alleged Lunatics' Friend Society. In more recent years the Society has been recognised as a pioneer of advocacy and the psychiatric survivors movement.
