= Richard Paternoster =

English civil servant

Richard Paternoster (14 October 1802 – 21 July 1892) was an English civil servant in the East India Company, a barrister and the founder of the Alleged Lunatics' Friend Society, an organisation that exposed abuses in lunatic asylums and campaigned for the reform of the lunacy laws.

== Early life and career ==
Paternoster was born in 1802 in London, the son of surgeon John Paternoster and Elizabeth Twining. He followed his older brother John to Haileybury College, where he was a brilliant student and won prizes for Sanskrit and Deva Nagri writing. He started his career in the Madras civil service as a writer (a junior clerk) and in 1824 was promoted to an assistant to the magistrate at Bellary. In 1827 he returned to England due to ill-health and was awarded a pension of £150 a year from the East India Company. After spending some time in Paris he settled in London, lodging with widowed basketmaker Catherine Scott and her children in Haymarket. Paternoster was interested in politics and in 1835 produced a handbill calling for parliamentary and various other reforms.

== Incarceration ==
In 1838 Paternoster quarrelled over money with his father and his brother-in-law, solicitor Thomas Wing. These two then arranged to have Paternoster certified as insane and incarcerated in William Finch's private madhouse in Kensington High Street. Paternoster immediately smuggled out a letter to Catherine Scott, who mobilised his friends to try to secure his release. The Metropolitan Commissioners in Lunacy were called in and by a vote of 6 to 4 pronounced him sane. The commissioners had, by law, to see a patient on three occasions at least 21 days apart before they could make a decision, so Paternoster spent 41 days in captivity.

== Alleged Lunatics' Friend Society ==
On his release Paternoster inserted an advertisement in The Times, appealing for others who shared his concerns about the lunacy laws to join him. Respondents included two people who were to play a leading role in the Alleged Lunatics' Friend Society (as the group was known when it became a formal organisation in 1845):

- John Thomas Perceval, son of the assassinated prime-minister Spencer Perceval and formerly a captain in the First or Grenadier Regiment of Foot Guards, had spent two and a half years in Brislington and Ticehurst asylums and had written a book about his experience: A narrative of the treatment experienced by a gentleman during a state of mental derangement. He was to become the honorary secretary of the Alleged Lunatics' Friend Society.
- Richard Saumarez, captain (and later admiral) in the Royal Navy and nephew of Admiral Lord de Samaurez, had two brothers, surgeon Frederick and rector Paul, who were Chancery lunatics. His concern was with the length and cost of Chancery proceedings, as well as the treatment his brothers had received in private asylums.

Former patients John Parkin, a surgeon, and William Bailey, an inventor, also responded to Paternoster's advertisement.

== Paternoster v. Finch ==
Paternoster took legal action against William Finch, the proprietor of Kensington House asylum, and several other people, including his father and his brother-in-law, who had been involved in his detention. The case was heard in the Court of Common Pleas and resulted in an agreement between the parties. Finch would pay the court costs and provide Paternoster with a life annuity of £150 a year. Paternoster then ran up huge legal bills in pursuit of his annuity.

== The Madhouse System ==
The Madhouse System

While he was in Kensington House, Paternoster kept notes of his treatment. Once released he researched parliamentary reports, visited asylums and contacted other patients and wrote a series of articles for the London magazine The Satirist. In 1841 he published these in the form of a book, The Madhouse System.

== Later life ==
In 1845 Paternoster became a barrister. He died, aged 89, in 1892.

== Don Leon ==
While Paternoster was in India, in 1825, he made a generous donation towards a statue of Lord Byron. Two and a half years later, disappointed at the lack of action of the statue committee, he wrote an angry letter, signed Byronicus, to The Times, accusing Byron's friends of having neglected him in both life and death. Byron scholar Doris Langley Moore used this as the basis of a theory that Paternoster could be the author of the anonymous poem Don Leon, although she admits that the "chain of evidence lacks even one link".
