= Madame Sala =

British actress and singer (1789–1860)

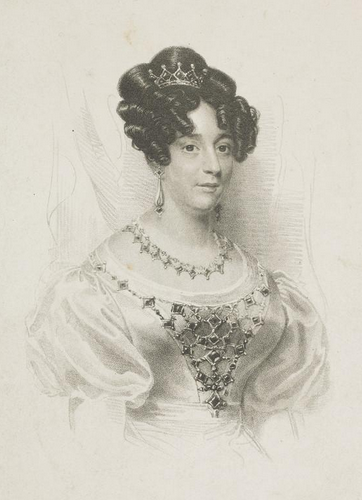
- Sala, by Thomas Woolnoth
- Born: Henrietta Catharina Florentina Simon c. 1789; Demerara
- Died: 1860 (aged 70–71); Brighton, East Sussex, England
- Other names: Henrietta Sala, Henrietta Simon Sala
- Occupations: actress, singer
- Years active: 1827–1859
- Children: George Augustus Sala

Henrietta Simon Sala, known as Madame Sala, (c. 1789-10 April 1860) was a British concert singer and salon holder. She was a free woman of colour from the Dutch Colony of Demerara. She was sent to England to attend school before she was ten years old and as her father lost his fortune, she stayed there for the rest of her life. She became a music teacher and performed on the London stage, appearing at venues including Covent Garden, the St James's Theatre, and the Haymarket Theatre.

As a widow with children to support, Sala cultivated relationships with royalty and the aristocracy to secure music students and support for benefit concerts. She performed with some of the leading artists of her era, but reviews of her performances were mixed. Though she struggled with poverty, her circle of friends from the acting community and admirers from her well-known salon helped her to provide for the care of her children. Even after she contracted smallpox and semi-retired from the stage in the 1840s, she used her friendship with Charles Dickens to launch the career of her youngest son.

== Early life ==
Henrietta Catharina Florentina Simon was born in 1789 in Demerara, a Dutch Colony in South America to Catherina (Catharina) Cells and D. P. Simon. Her mother was born in Montserrat, the daughter of the slave Dorothy Kirwan and probable daughter of John Coesvelt Cells, a British planter who had property in Montserrat and was listed as living in Demerara in 1785. It is unclear when Cells was manumitted, but by 1793, she was living as a free woman of colour. D. P. Simon was a planter, who operated the plantation "Chance Hall" and was a neighbour of John Coesvelt Cells. He may have been a Sephardic Jew, though other accounts list him as having been born in Dantzig as a Prussian nobleman or as a Polish colonel, who was a cousin of King Stanisław Leszczyński.

D. P. began having financial problems in 1794, but he sent his eldest child, Henrietta, abroad to study at the Kensington House Academy in 1796, under the care of his London merchant, Charles McGarel. He lost his plantation in 1804 and in 1807, his remaining estate was sold. He became an official translator for the government and by 1810 had become a captain in the Colonial Militia, titled the "Marshal of the Courts of the Colony". He was selected that year to lead a commission to determine if two warring indigenous tribes in the interior had settled their differences. The map made during the expedition became important in establishing the southern boundaries of British Guiana with Brazil. In spite of his earnings, D. P. was reliant on his mother-in-law and his wife's income from trading in land and slaves to pay for the care and education of his six children.

McGarel found lodging for Henrietta in the home of the widow Susanna Sala, (Note: Straus indicates that the unnamed widow of Claudio Sebastiano Sala, grandparents of George Augustus Sala, was not English and stated that she had six children. George Augustus' father's birth record indicates that his parents were Augustus and Susanna Sala. This information is confirmed by Candlin and Pybus, who state that Augustus John James Sala's parents were Augustus and Susanna Sala. Susanna was Augustus' second wife, whom he married in England after the death (before 1790) of his Italian wife, who had been his professional dancing partner.) who lived in Marylebone. At Kensington House Academy, Simon studied English etiquette, French, and music. When she turned eighteen in 1807, she received a communication from her father that no further funds would be forthcoming and that she must earn her own living. She left Kensington and began studying at the school run by Susanna Sala since the death of her husband in 1800. Simon also studied voice with Timothy Essex and Thomas Welsh. She had little contact with her family until 1810, when her grandmother, Dorothy Thomas, arrived with her two youngest children; over a dozen of her Coxall, Garraway, Robertson, and Fullerton cousins; and some of her own siblings from Demerara to enroll them in school. The girls attended Kensington House Academy and the boys were enrolled at Glasgow's Dollar Academy. Simon very probably secured a dowry from her grandmother to facilitate her marriage to Susanna's son Augustus John James Sala on 22 June 1812.

== Career ==
The couple moved to an address around the corner from Susanna and both engaged in teaching. Augustus and Henrietta taught at his mother's school, but to continue her training with Giovanni Velluti, Henrietta taught at his musical academy. She also took voice and dance lessons with Diomiro Tramezzani and James Harvey D'Egville, privately performing at musical evenings for elite guests, when she was not giving birth or tending to the needs of her thirteen children. Among those who attended her concerts in Brighton and London were the future King William IV; his wife, Adelaide of Saxe-Meiningen; his daughter, Lady Augusta FitzClarence; his brother Prince Adolphus, Duke of Cambridge; and his sister-in-law Princess Augusta of Hesse-Kassel, who all may also have been patrons.

The Salas' marriage was troubled, possibly because of a problem with gambling and alcoholism on the part of Augustus and a series of affairs on the part of Henrietta. (Note: Sala's oldest daughter, Henrietta D'Egville Sala (1814–1817), was named for the dancing instructor, James Harvey D'Egville; her son, Charles Kerrison Sala (1823–1857), was named for his godfather, Sir Edward Kerrison, 1st Baronet, one of her admirers; and her youngest son, George Augustus Henry Fairfield Sala (1828–1895) was the legal child of Augustus Sala, but his natural father and godfather was Captain Charles "Henry" Fairfield. Candlin and Pybus note that these naming patterns might be indicative of paternal variations. Dorothy Thomas, Sala's grandmother, had taken care to list her children's paternal surnames in official records, confirming their different white fathers.) As a result of financial difficulties, Sala began a career on the stage. She made her first public appearance in 1827 at Covent Garden in the role of Countess Almaviva in Mozart's The Marriage of Figaro, as adapted by Henry Bishop, supporting Madame Vestris in the lead role of Susanna. Sala's review in The Literary Gazette noted her stage fright and several missteps, describing her voice as a sweet mezzo soprano which brought "great feeling and delicacy" to her performance. Three months later, an article appeared in The Lady's Monthly Museum introducing Sala to the public with a carefully constructed biography aimed at cultivating an audience among those who would appreciate her ladylike attributes. The performance gained mixed reviews, but she repeated the role on New Year's Day the following year. After the death of her husband in 1829, she supported the five surviving children, Frederic Augustus, Charles Kerrison, Augusta Sophia, Albert, and George Augustus, through singing lessons and concert performances.

Following the custom and habit of the elite clients she sought to instruct, Sala moved the family between Brighton and London, as the social season dictated. She performed semi-annual benefits, with the intent of attracting students from the aristocratic audiences and many of the actors and singers who participated in the events waved their usual fees. In addition, she hosted a salon, which attracted various society figures including Charles Dickens, who became a supporter and friend. In 1831, she performed with Paganini, the most renowned violinist of his day, in two concerts. While her reviews by the Brighton Herald critic were unfavorable, The Morning Post reported that she was applauded for a charming performance. Throughout the 1836 and 1837 season, she was the main actress at the St James's Theatre, performing in Dickens' plays, The Strange Gentleman, as Julia Dobbs and in Is She His Wife?, as Mrs. Limbury earning acclaim for the roles. She was known as a versatile performer who could act, dance and sing, and was regularly engaged at the St James's Theatre and at the Haymarket.

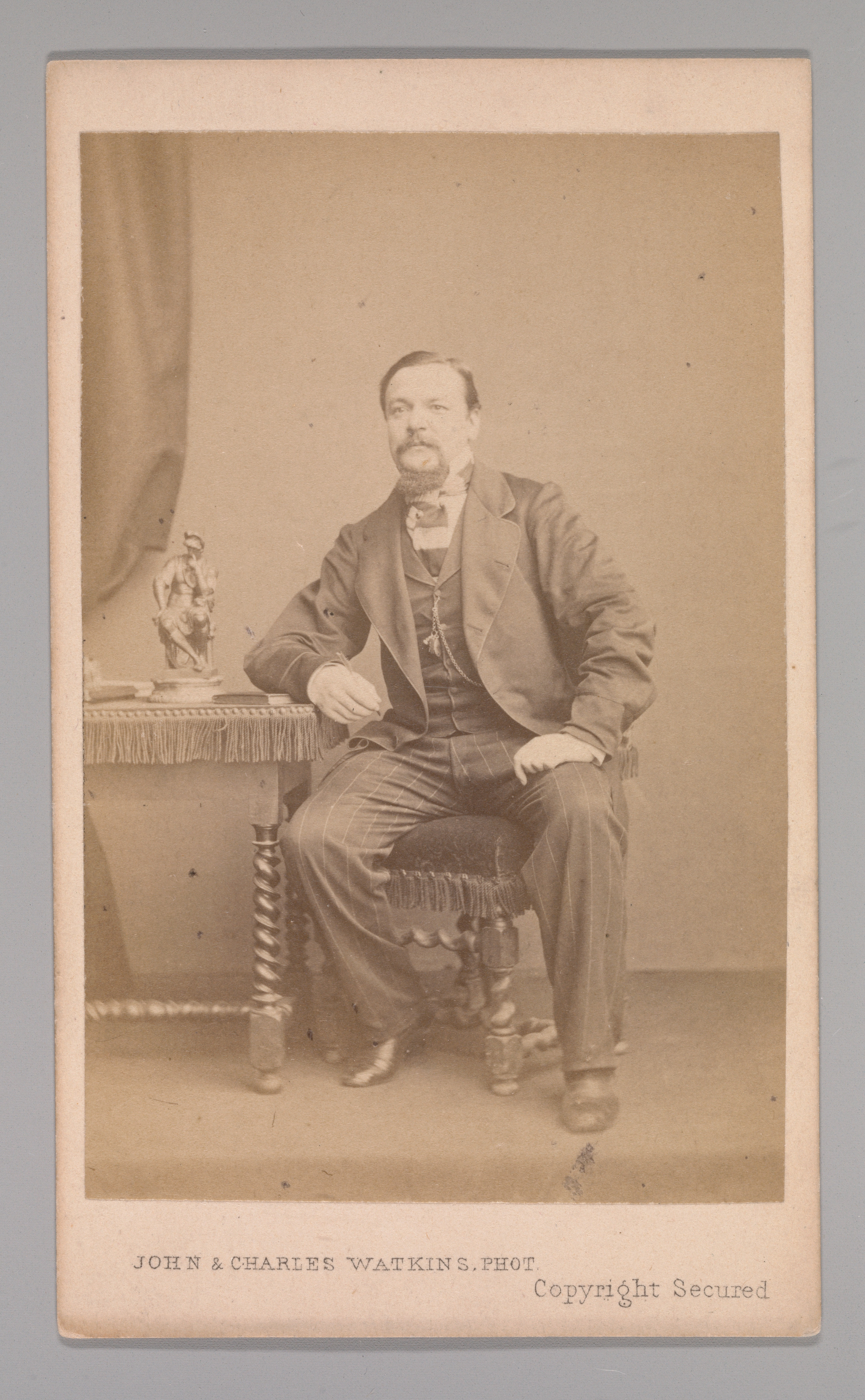
George Augustus Sala, ca. 1860

In 1838, Sala contracted smallpox and thanks her contacts was able to receive good medical care. Though she eventually recovered, the disease damaged her sight, pockmarked her face, and left her unable to earn money during her two-year recovery. Her friends, including members of the Royal Society of Musicians held charitable benefits to provide for her care. In 1840, Sala attempted to move her career to Paris, but was unsuccessful there. She returned to England in 1841 and appeared with her children in The Yellow Rose and her son Charles' adaptation of Hamlet at the Theatre Royal, in Dover, though neither were successful. To earn the fare back to London, she organized two masked balls to entertain her grandmother, Dorothy Thomas, who was in Britain, visiting family. Living in a rundown boardinghouse and having failed to attract students, for the 1842 season Sala performed at the Princess's Theatre on Oxford Street.

Still suffering from ill-health and problems with her eyesight, Sala permanently lived in Brighton from 1843, but continued to give annual concerts until 1859. Though she may have hoped for a legacy when her grandmother died in 1846, Thomas subtracted funds she had expended on behalf of her heirs in her lifetime from the bequests she made. Sala's mother, Catherina Simon received only clothes and table linens and the Simon children and grandchildren received nothing. Sala and her youngest son became estranged but in 1851, she called on her friend Charles Dickens to help George in his writing career. Dickens accepted a story from the younger Sala and published it in Household Words, launching the young man's career.

== Death and legacy ==
Sala died on 10 April 1860 at her home in Brighton, East Sussex, England and was buried at Kensal Green Cemetery. Despite the fact that free coloured women were doubly disadvantaged she became well known in society, mixing with the aristocracy and royalty. Though not a great artiste, she was able to use her connections to provide for her family and perform with some of the most noted actors of her day. Her son Frederic became a music teacher in Buckinghamshire and her son Charles followed in her footsteps on the stage. Augusta secured work as the governess for a Member of Parliament and Albert joined the Royal Navy. Her youngest child, George, was "a literary luminary in his day", but his memoirs, and in particular his autobiographical novels, fabricate his history and reveal both the bitterness he held against his mother and his own racism, caused by trying to be accepted as white in an era in which race mattered significantly.
