= Brislington House =

House in Brislington, Bristol, UK

- (Long Fox Manor)
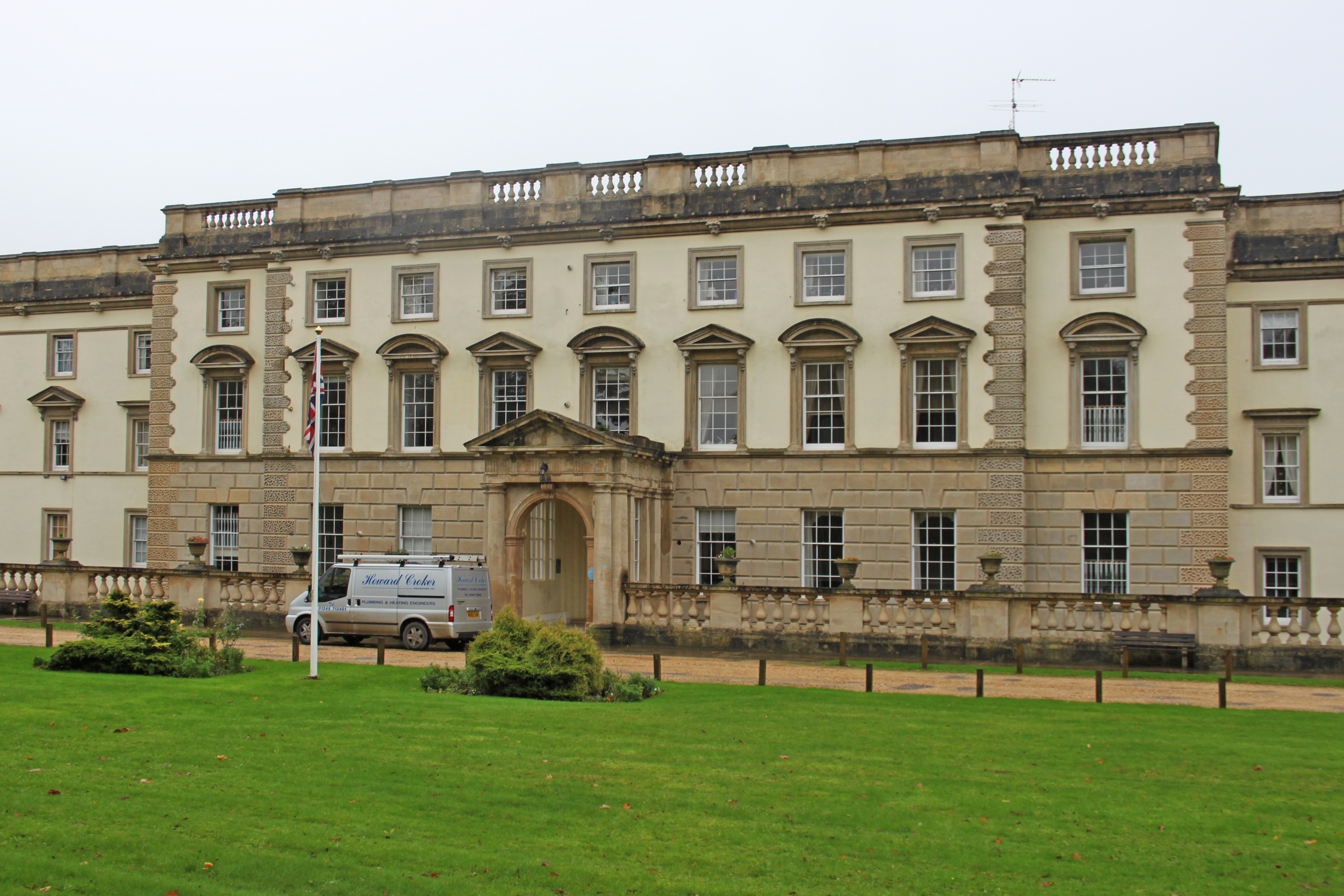
- The front of the central block at Brislington House

Quick reference
Location of Brislington House in Bristol
51°25′48″N 2°31′46″W
Location	Brislington, Bristol, England
History
Built	1806
Built for	Edward Long Fox
Listed Building – Grade II
Official name	Brislington House and attached chapel
Designated	21 March 1984
Reference no.	1203910
National Register of Historic Parks and Gardens
Official name	Brislington House
Type	II*
Designated	25 May 2001
Reference no.	1001529
Listed Building – Grade II
Official name	Ornamental Garden Alcove
Designated	10 January 2002
Reference no.	1389633
Listed Building – Grade II
Official name	Swiss Cottage
Designated	30 December 1994
Reference no.	1202315
Listed Building – Grade II
Official name	Lodge Cottage
Designated	4 March 1977
Reference no.	1281465

Brislington House (now known as Long Fox Manor) was built as a private lunatic asylum. When it opened in 1806 it was one of the first purpose-built asylums in England. It is situated on the Bath Road in Brislington, Bristol, although parts of the grounds cross the city boundary into the parish of Keynsham in Bath and North East Somerset.

The Palladian-fronted building was originally seven separate blocks into which patients were allocated depending on their class. The buildings, estate and therapeutic regime designed by Edward Long Fox were based on the principles of moral treatment that was fashionable at the time. Brislington House later influenced the design and construction of other asylums and influenced Acts of Parliament.

The house and ancillary structures are listed buildings that have now been converted into private residences. The original grounds are Grade II* listed on the Register of Historic Parks and Gardens of special historic interest in England and now include St. Brendan's Sixth Form College, sports pitches and some farmland. They are now included on the Heritage at Risk Register.

== History ==
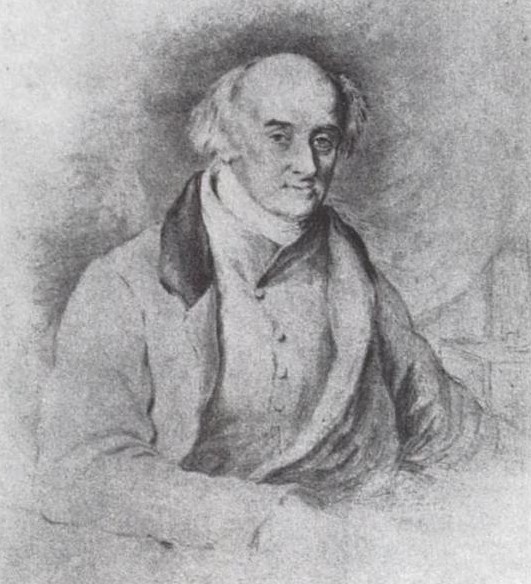
Edward Long Fox

The asylum was established by Edward Long Fox and considered state of the art when it opened in 1806, having been built on moral treatment ideas pioneered at the York Retreat, which had opened in 1796. Fox had an extensive private practice in Bristol and served as a physician at Bristol Infirmary before taking over a madhouse at Cleeve Hill in 1792. He had a range of different businesses locally and was able to pay £4,000 for the Brislington Estate. The site had previously been Brislington Common, which had been enclosed in 1780. The site, on the main road between Bristol and Bath, now the A4, enabled him to attract wealthy clients from both cities.

Fox divided the patients at Brislington House according to social class, '1st', '2nd' and '3rd' class ladies and gentlemen, who were housed in different blocks, as well as behavioural presentation. Fox insisted that patients should be separated from their families as they needed to move away from the conventional authority of the head of the household following the madness of King George III. It had erroneously been suggested that the king become a patient at Brislington House.

Each block had access to courtyards, known as airing courts, and the asylum was surrounded by extensive grounds. At the end of each courtyard were stone rooms used to house incontinent patients, who slept on straw beds. All buildings were made from stone and iron, avoiding the use of wood because of the potential fire hazard. Hot and cold plunge baths were also included, as Fox saw their use as an important part of treatment, which may have been related to his Quaker beliefs and John Wesley's advocacy of the practice. The total construction cost around £35,000. In addition to the wealthy private patients, paupers funded by parish funds were also admitted and kept in accommodation furthest from the central block, which was for the highest in society.

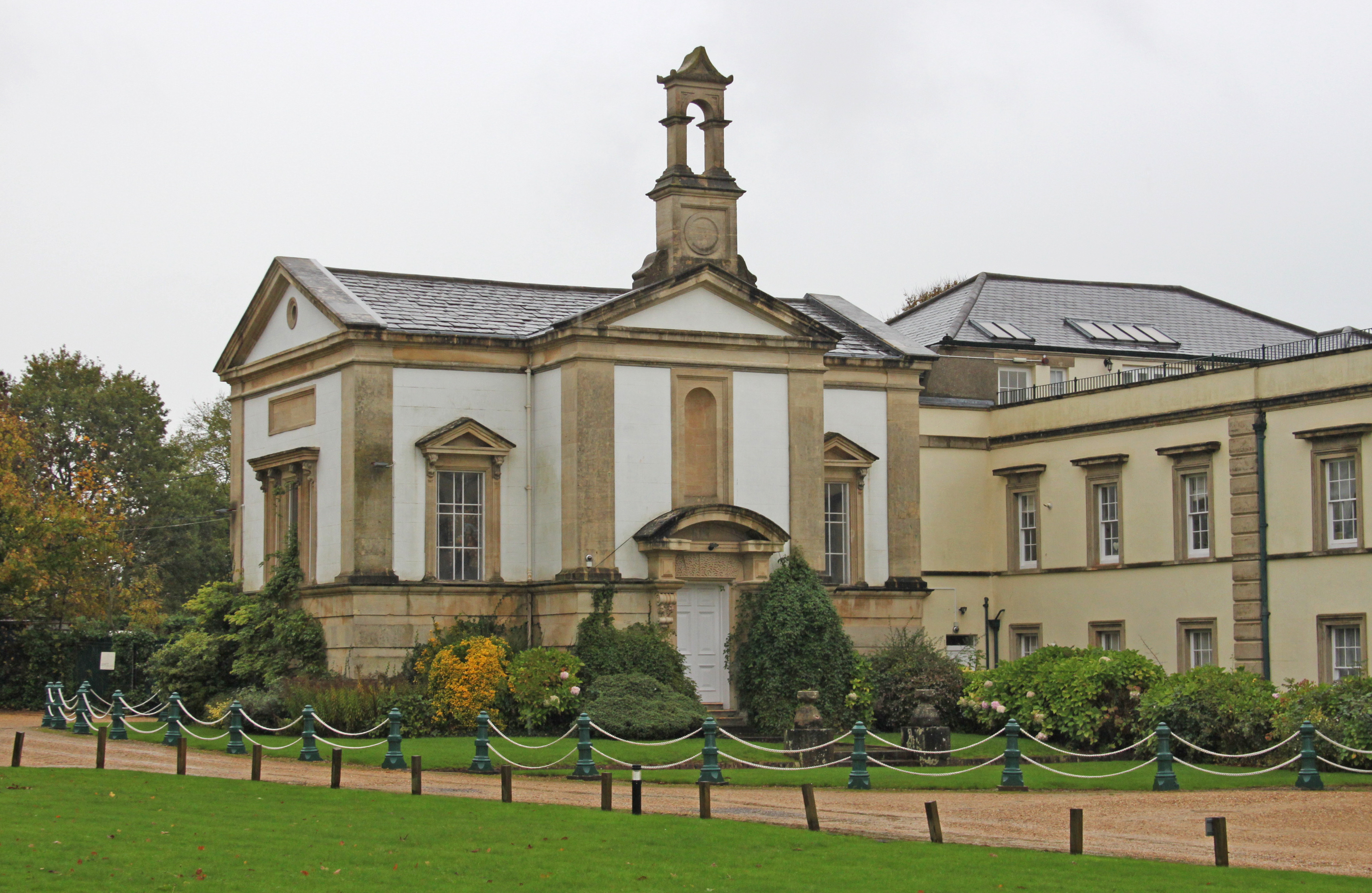
The chapel at Brislington House

By 1844 there were 60 private patients. The building was refronted and a chapel added in 1851. The design of the buildings and the therapeutic regime were seen as models to be followed elsewhere, including at the Nottingham General Lunatic Asylum at Sneinton, and the drafting of the 1808 County Asylums Act and Lunacy Act 1845.

The asylum continued to be owned and run by physicians from the Fox family until the Second World War. The asylum did not become part of the National Health Service when it was formed in 1948, being categorised as a "disclaimed hospital". In 1951 it was sold to the Royal United Hospital, who used it as a nurses' home until the 1980s, when it became a care home for the elderly. In the 2002 / 2003 it was converted into flats and its name changed to Long Fox Manor.

=== Patients ===
John Thomas Perceval, the son of Spencer Perceval, spent about a year at Brislington House, from 1831 until February 1832, followed by two years at Ticehurst House, Ticehurst in Sussex. In Brislington House Perceval experienced, in spite of the expense, a regime of deprivation, brutality and degradation. For eight months, during which time he was completely under the control of his voices, spirits and presences, he was kept under restraint, either in a straitjacket or tied down in bed. Treatment consisted of cold baths and an operation to sever his temporal artery. He was later one of the founders of the Alleged Lunatics' Friend Society and acted as their honorary secretary for about twenty years. Perceval's two books about his experience in asylums were republished by the anthropologist Gregory Bateson in 1962.

The artist Frank Miles was committed to Brislington House in 1887.

== Architecture ==
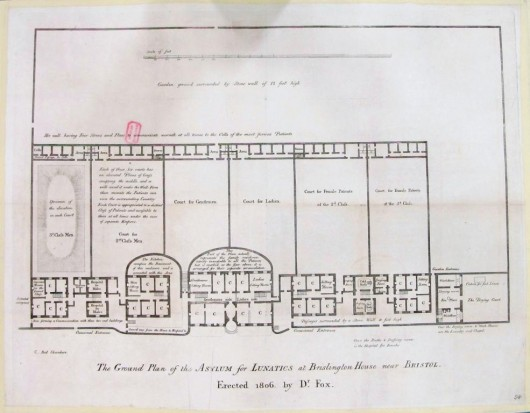
Floor plan of Brislington House Asylum from 1806. Scale 1:240

The front of the building is in the Palladian style, with a central block and two wings, all of which have slate roofs. The three-storey central block has a Doric porch and a nine-window range. The wings on either side have six-window ranges. On the southern end is an attached pavilion and on the northern end is the chapel, which contains a window from St Luke's Church, Brislington. The current layout was developed in the mid-19th century from the original separate blocks, which had been linked by a corridor at basement level.

== Grounds ==
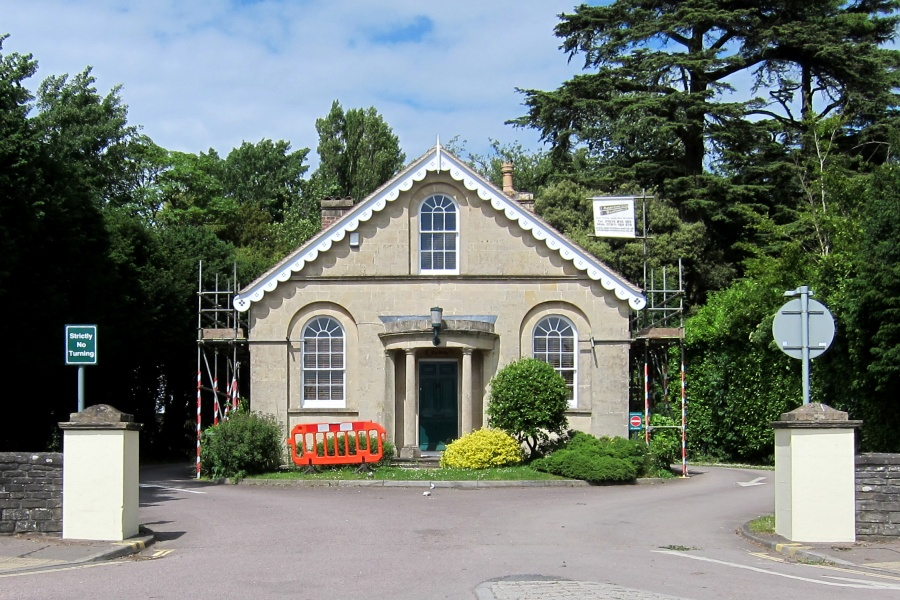
The lodge house contained the mechanism to open and close the gates

The extensive grounds covered around 36 hectares (89 acres) with 2 hectares (4.9 acres) of kitchen gardens, 6 hectares (15 acres) of pleasure grounds and gardens, with the remaining 25 hectares (62 acres) being parkland, which is now largely covered with sports fields. They were laid out as part of the regimen of moral treatment that was in vogue when the asylum was built. They included pathways and walks including one along the cliff above the River Avon. There were also facilities for various recreational activities, including a bowling green and fives court, and later football and cricket pitches. The inclusion of a grotto and other eye-catching features, along with attractive views, may have been seen as therapeutic and based on the ideas of Archibald Alison as expressed in his work Essays on the Nature and Principles of Taste (1790). He based these on the principle of "association", which suggested that seeing objects of beauty could help to correct thought patterns.

There were several cottages on the estate, the first of which, The Beeches, was built for the Fox family. Swiss Cottage, which was built in 1819, was originally known as Carysfoot Cottage, when the Earl of Carysfort was a patient there. Lanesborough Cottage was built as accommodation for Lord Lanesborough. The lodge house was originally called the wheelhouse as it contained the mechanism used to open and close the iron gates to the asylum. A garden alcove dating from around 1820 is a Grade II listed building.

In the late 1950s The Beeches and a large part of the grounds were sold for the establishment of St. Brendan's Sixth Form College. The grounds, which are Grade II* listed on the Register of Historic Parks and Gardens of special historic interest in England, are now on the Heritage at Risk Register of Historic England.
