= Vanessa Riley =

American novelist

Vanessa Riley is an American novelist of Caribbean descent who writes historical fiction, romance fiction, and mystery fiction.

== Life and education ==
Riley grew up reading the works of Jane Austen, Ralph Waldo Emerson, and Henry David Thoreau. Riley earned a Ph.D. in mechanical engineering from Stanford University. She started reading romance fiction when she was at Stanford. She lives in Atlanta.

== Career ==
=== Novels ===
Riley writes mainly historical romances, including some in the Regency romance subgenre.

Her early works were published digitally. Her debut print novel, A Duke, The Lady, and a Baby (2020), was inspired by the film The First Wives Club (1996).

Island Queen, published in 2021, is a historical fiction novel about enslaved person-turned-landowner Dorothy Thomas set in the Caribbean in the early 1800s. It was optioned for film by Julie Anne Robinson through her company Longboat Pictures at the manuscript stage, and will be executive produced by Adjoa Andoh.

=== Other writing ===
Riley has written for The Washington Post.

== Critical reception ==
Riley's books Sister Mother Warrior (2022); The Duke, The Lady, and a Baby (2020); An Earl, the Girl, and a Toddler (2021); and A Duke, the Spy, an Artist, and a Lie (2022) have received starred reviews from Booklist, Library Journal, and Publishers Weekly. Publishers Weekly called A Duke, the Lady, and a Baby a "bewitching Regency series opener." It criticized An Earl, the Girl, and a Toddler for its "choppy writing" that "slightly undermines the otherwise riveting romance." Publishers Weekly wrote of A Duke, the Spy, an Artist, and a Lie that "Riley masterfully plays up the will-they-won’t-they between husband and wife as the emotionally charged romance twists to its conclusion. This sends out the series on a high note."

Library Journal called Sister Mother Warrior a "sweeping, powerful historical novel." Her mystery fiction debut, Murder in Westminster (2022), was reviewed positively by Publishers Weekly, which wrote, "Riley offers a vibrant picture of the roles Black and mixed-race people played in Regency life," though also noted that "the backstory introducing series characters sometimes feels clumsy and the modern language can be distracting." Carole V. Bell of The New York Times wrote positively of Island Queen: "Though Dorothy’s life is extraordinary, the reason her triumphs and stumbles hit so hard is that Riley does a brilliant job of connecting those events to something bigger... Evocative and immersive, Riley’s narrative bears that weight with grace."

== Selected works ==
- Unmasked Heart: A Regency Romance. Gallium Optronics, 2016.
- Island Queen. William Morrow, 2021.
- Sister Mother Warrior. William Morrow, 2022.
- Fire Sword and Sea. William Morrow, 2026.

=== Lady Worthington mysteries ===
- Murder in Westminster. Kensington, 2022.
- Murder in Drury Lane. Kensington, 2023.
- Murder in Berkeley Square. Kensington, 2024.

=== Rogues and Remarkable Women series ===
- The Duke, the Lady, and a Baby. Zebra, 2020.
- An Earl, the Girl, and a Toddler. Zebra, 2021.
- A Duke, the Spy, an Artist, and a Lie. Zebra, 2022.

=== Betting Against the Duke series ===
- A Gamble at Sunset. Zebra, 2024.
- A Wager at Midnight. Zebra, 2025.
- A Deal at Dawn. Zebra, 2026.
