= George Augustus Sala =

British journalist (1828–1895)

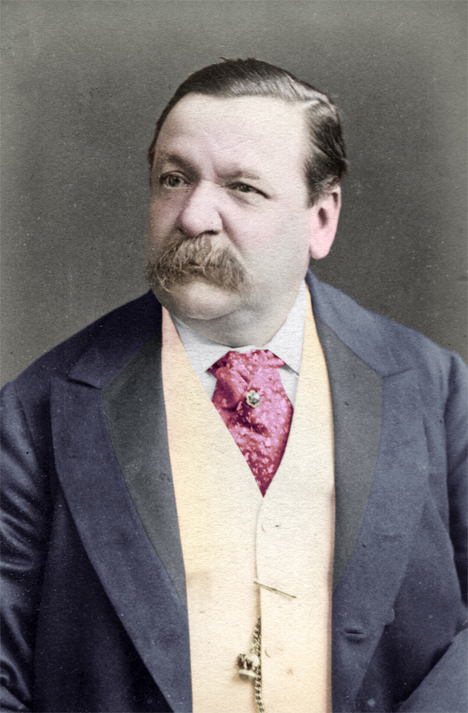
- Born: George Augustus Henry Fairfield Sala; November 24, 1828; London, United Kingdom
- Died: December 8, 1895 (aged 67)
- Occupations: Author, journalist
- Mother: Henrietta Catharina Simon
- Family: Dorothy Thomas (great-grandmother)

George Augustus Henry Fairfield Sala (24 November 1828 – 8 December 1895) was an author and journalist who wrote extensively for the Illustrated London News as G. A. S. and was most famous for his articles and leaders for The Daily Telegraph. He founded his own periodical, Sala's Journal, and the Savage Club. The former was unsuccessful but the latter still continues.

== Life ==
Sala was born on 24 November 1828 in London. His legal father was Augustus John James Sala (1789–1829) the son of an Italian who came to London to arrange ballets at the theatres. His natural father and godfather was Captain Charles "Henry" Fairfield, an acquaintance of his mother, Henrietta Catharina Simon (1789–1860), an actress and teacher of singing. She was the daughter of Catherina Cells, a former slave, and Demerara planter D. P. Simon. His great-grandmother was the Caribbean entrepreneur Dorothy Thomas. He was at school at Paris from 1839 but his family returned to England due to the political unrest in the city. He learnt drawing in London, and in his earlier years he did odd jobs in scene-painting (for John Medex Maddox at the Princess's Theatre, London) and book illustration. The connection of his mother and elder brother (Charles Kerrison Sala) with the theatre gave him useful introductions to authors and artists.

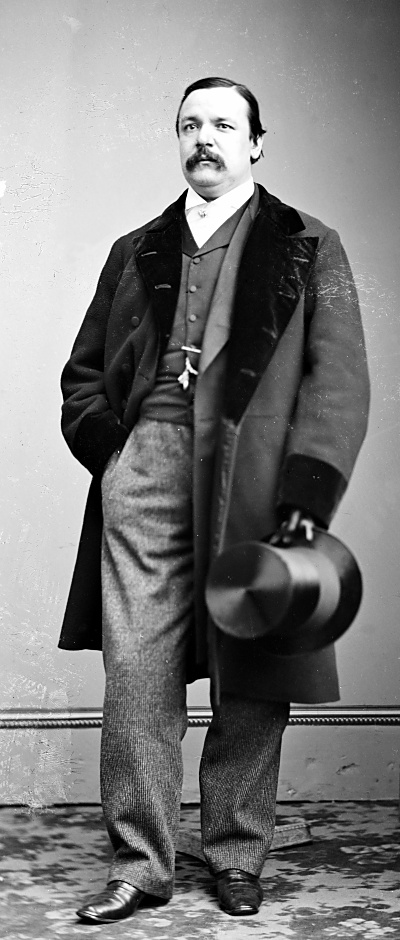
Portrait of George Augustus Sala by Mathew Brady, ca. 1860

At an early date he tried his hand at writing, and in 1851 attracted the attention of Charles Dickens, who published articles and stories by him in Household Words and subsequently in All the Year Round, and in 1856 sent him to Russia as a special correspondent. About the same time he got to know Edmund Yates, with whom, in his earlier years, he was constantly connected in his journalistic ventures and also become a lifelong friend of the penny dreadful publisher Edwin Brett. In 1860, over his own initials "G.A.S.", he began writing "Echoes of the Week" for the Illustrated London News, and continued to do so until 1886, when they were continued in a syndicate of weekly newspapers almost to his death. William Makepeace Thackeray, when editor of the Cornhill, published articles by him on Hogarth in 1860, which were issued in column form in 1866; and in the former year he was given the editorship of Temple Bar, which he held until 1863.

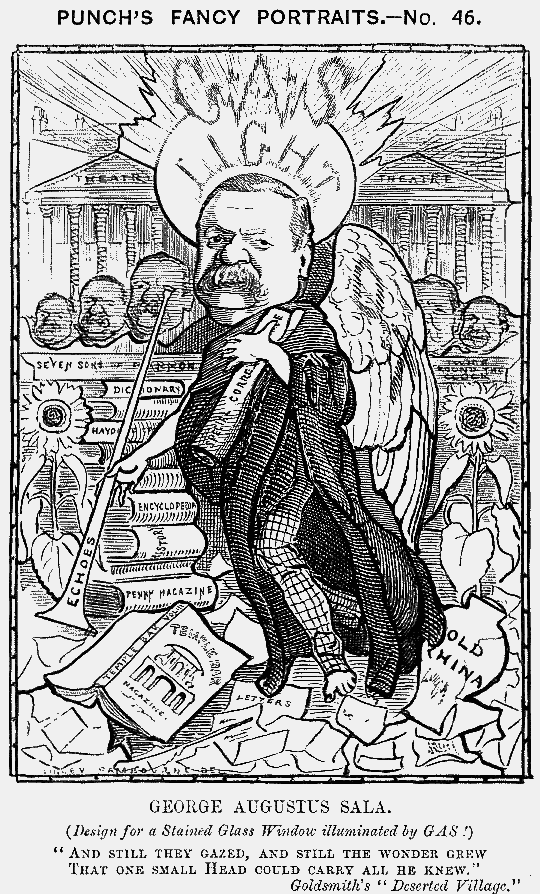
1881 Caricature from Punch

Meanwhile, he had become in 1857 a contributor to The Daily Telegraph, and it was in this capacity that he did his most characteristic work, whether as a foreign correspondent in all parts of the world, or as a writer of "leaders" or special articles. His literary style, highly coloured and bombastic, gradually became associated by the public with their conception of the Daily Telegraph; and though the butt of the more scholarly literary world, his articles were invariably full of interesting matter and helped to make the reputation of the paper. He collected a large library and had an elaborate system of keeping common-place books, so that he could be turned on to write upon any conceivable subject with the certainty that he would bring into his article enough show or reality of special information to make it excellent reading for a not very critical public; and his extraordinary faculty for never saying the same thing twice in the same way had a sort of "sporting" interest even to those who were more particular. Also in 1857, Sala became one of the founders of the Savage Club, which still flourishes today.

He earned a large income from the Telegraph and other sources, but he never could keep his money. In 1879, Sala wrote a bawdy pantomime called Harlequin Prince Cherrytop, which subsequently was adapted as a monologue sometimes called The Sod's Opera and is often falsely attributed to Gilbert and Sullivan. Three years later, he published a pornographic novel of flagellation erotica entitled The Mysteries of Verbena House (under the pseudonym Etonensis) and a travelogue of North America. In 1892, when his popular reputation was at its height, he started a weekly paper called Sala's Journal, but it was a disastrous failure; and in 1895 he had to sell his library of 13,000 volumes. Lord Rosebery gave him a civil list pension of £100 a year, but he was a broken-down man, and he died at Brighton, England, on 8 December 1895.

Sala published many volumes of fiction, travels and essays, and he edited various other works, but his métier was that of ephemeral journalism; and his name goes down to posterity as perhaps the most popular and most voluble of the newspaper men of the period.

During a visit to Australia in 1885, Sala coined the phrase "Marvellous Melbourne" to describe the booming city of Melbourne, a phrase which stuck with the locals and is still used to this day.

Mrs. George Augustus Sala died in Melbourne, Victoria, Australia 31 December 1885, after a very brief illness. In 1890, Sala married a second wife, Bessie Stannard, who was the sister-in-law of writer John Strange Winter [Henrietta Vaughan Stannard].

== Quotations ==
"In the course of life, it is by little acts of watchful kindness recurring daily and hourly, by words, tones, gestures, looks, that affection is won and preserved"

"A future is always a fairyland to the young."

"And for how long will a People suffer the mad tyranny of a Ruler, who outrages their Laws, who strangles their Liberties, who fleeces and squeezes and tramples upon them" (The Strange Adventures of Captain Dangerous).

"There is a mighty quantity of Sand and good store of Mud at Ostend, and a very comforting smell of fish." (The Strange Adventures of Captain Dangerous).

"Not only to say the right thing, at the right place, but far more difficult to leave unsaid, the wrong thing, at the tempting moment!"

"Melbourne the Marvellous" commonly misquoted or shortened today as "Marvellous Melbourne."

== Bibliography ==
- A Journey Due North, Being Notes of a Residence in Russia (1858)
- Accepted Addresses (1862)
- The Strange Adventures of Captain Dangerous, In Three Volumes (1863)
  - Vol. 1
  - Vol. 2
  - Vol. 3
- Quite Alone (1864). Completed by A.H. Duff. Originally appeared in All The Year Round 1864-65.
  - Vol. 1
  - Vol. 2
  - Vol. 3
- My Diary in America in the Midst of War (1865)
  - Vol. I
  - Vol. II
- A Trip to Barbary by a Roundabout Route (1866)
- Notes and sketches of the Paris exhibition (1868)
- Paris Herself Again in 1878-9 (1880)
  - Vol. I
  - Vol. II
- America Revisited: From the Bay of New York to the Gulf of Mexico, and from Lake Michigan to the Pacific (1882)
- The Mysteries of Verbena House (1882)
- Things I have Seen and People I have Known (1894) (in USA The life and adventures of George Augustus Sala (1895))
  - Vol. I
  - Vol. II
- The Land of the Golden Fleece: George Augustus Sala in Australia and New Zealand in 1885, Edited by Robert Dingley, Canberra, Mulini Press, 1995.
- (collected in) American Food Writing: An Anthology with Classic Recipes, ed. Molly O'Neill (Library of America, 2007) ISBN 1-59853-005-4
- Twice Round the Clock, or, The Hours of the Day and Night in London
