= John Till Adams =

English Quaker physician

John Till Adams (13 November 1748, Bristol – 12 February 1786, Bristol) was an English Quaker physician who lived in Bristol in the eighteenth century. He was active amongst the quaker community in Bristol, and Edward Long Fox cared for his patients after his death.
