= St Brendan's Sixth Form College =

Coordinates: 51°25′48″N 2°32′03″W

St. Brendan's Sixth Form College

Location
- Broomhill Road; Brislington, Bristol, BS4 5RQ; England

Information
- Type: Sixth Form, College
- Religious affiliation: Roman Catholic
- Local authority: Bristol
- Department for Education URN: 130563 Tables
- Ofsted: Reports
- Principal: Marian Curran
- Gender: Mixed
- Age: 16 to 19
- Website: https://www.stbrn.ac.uk/

St Brendan's is a state-funded sixth form college located in Brislington, Bristol, England. Over 1,700 students study A-levels, BTECs & GCSEs on one purpose-built, university-style campus.

== History ==
St Brendan's was founded by the Irish Christian Brothers as a Catholic school for boys in 1896 in Berkeley Square in Bristol. During the first fifty years of its existence it played a part in developing an educated Catholic laity in and around Bristol. Many of its pupils entered the priesthood as well as other professions.

== Direct grant grammar school ==
Following the Education Act 1944, Saint Brendan's became a boys' direct grant grammar school and by the late 1950s had outgrown the Berkeley Square site. The Brothers purchased a house (the Beeches) and extensive grounds of Brislington House in Brislington, built the present accommodation, and moved to Brislington in 1960. The grammar school was wound down over several years, the last of the old grammar school students, some having joined the Preparatory School in 1975, many having joined the senior school in 1978, joined the sixth form in 1983.

== Present-day: sixth form college ==
In the late 1970s, as a result of a reorganisation of Catholic secondary education in Bristol and Bath, St Brendan's became a coeducational sixth form college providing a range of A level, BTEC and other Level 3 courses for students aged 16+. Its reputation and the breadth of subjects and courses now offered draw many students from secondary schools across Bristol, Bath and South Gloucestershire. St Brendan's is an inclusive college, and membership of the Catholic faith is not a prerequisite.

In 2009 the college was almost entirely rebuilt, with the latest technology, a new music and performing arts building, a new dance studio and a theatre, offering opportunities for a range of performing arts, including music, dance and drama and also for music technology. Other provision includes a county-standard sports hall for a very wide range of sports with a fully equipped fitness suite, and a Design and Technology design studio and workshop with 21st-century machinery such as laser cutters and a 3D colour printer.

Marian Curran was appointed principal in 2020, after having been vice principal since 2018.

St. Brendan's Sixth Form College shown within Bristol and the UK

== Student Union ==
The St. Brendan's Student Union is a large part of the college's community. The union is made up of a committee of students elected by the student body annually which support and represent the students and organises events. The union is closely affiliated with the NUS and regularly send its electorates and students to events like the NUS Annual, NUS LGBT and NUS Black Conference.

St. Brendan's Relationships, a society within the college, is inclusive and supportive of LGBT members, and mainly focuses on four key areas: advice, campaigning, support, and social. In May 2009, the group won the National Union of Students LGBT Campaign award "FE Society of the Year".

== Enrichment ==
There is a range of college enrichment activities that runs throughout the timetable including sport, drama, art, music, journalism, and chaplaincy activities providing opportunities for personal development and skills acquisition.

== See also ==
- List of direct grant grammar schools
- List of Christian Brothers schools
