= John Medex Maddox =

British playwright

John Medex Maddox (1789–1861) was a Victorian-era playwright and one-time manager of the Princess's Theatre in London's Oxford Street. Of Jewish descent, Maddox had been born John Medex and used "Maddox" as an ornamental suffix. His brother, Samuel Medex kept a cigar shop directly opposite the Princess's Theatre and his premises became something of a meeting point for London's actors and playwrights.

Until taking over the Princesses Theatre in 1842, Maddox had led a roving life as stage-manager, acting-manager, and agent. He had also enjoyed a brief spell as manager of London's Colosseum theatre.

Charles, Duke of Brunswick, an exiled German aristocrat and London character, lent Maddox the cash to tide him over during the first few months of his management. His first productions at the Princesses were the opera La Sonnambula and an Oriental burlesque.

The chief feature of Maddox's reign were English versions of Italian operas, with productions of Anna Bolena, Lucia di Lammermoor, Otello, I puritani and Lucrezia Borgia. Maddox prospered, and gradually enlarged his sphere of operations. The first English version of the French vaudeville, L'homme Blesse, was brought out at the Princesses in 1842-43, after which he staged Christmas, Easter, and Whitsuntide extravaganzas, but shrank from the financial risk of a Christmas pantomime. He was not averse to paying good salaries to first-rate English comedians—in particular Mr. and Mrs. Keeley who drew huge crowds to the theatre. Robert Keeley eventually took over as co-manager with Charles Kean after Maddox retired.

Maddox was also a prolific playwright and authored a number of dramas and farces, as well as sub-contracting work to a number of hack writers and translators. It was reputed that he was in the habit of locking up his them up in a garret at the theatre, leaving them just enough cold meat, bread and alcohol as was necessary, and not releasing them until they had finished the work he had paid them for. One of his earlier protégés was George Augustus Sala who undertook scene-painting for the theatre and later found a degree of fame writing pieces for Charles Dickens' Household Words.

== Plays ==
- A.S.S: a farce (Lyceum, April 1853)
- A Fast Train! High Pressure! Express! (Lyceum, April 1853)
- Chesterfield Thinskin: a farce (Princesses, July 1853)
- The First Night: a comic drama
- Infanticide or the Bohemian Mother: a melodrama in three acts
- Peter the shipwright: comic opera in three acts
- The Violet: drama in two acts
- Frederick the Great
- A Bachelor of Arts
- The King and the Deserter
- A Curious Case: a comic drama (1850)
