= Dorothea Christina Thomas =

Free woman of colour and slave owner from Grenada (1796–1846)

- Born: 26 June 1796; St. George's, Grenada
- Died: after 1846; Georgetown, Demerara, British Guiana
- Other names: Christina Thomas, Dorothea Gordon
- Mother: Dorothy Thomas

Dorothea Christina Thomas (26 June 1796 – after 1846) was a free woman of colour and slave owner from Grenada, whose common-law marriage with Major John Gordon became the centre of a Scottish legal case. It set an important precedent defining the circumstances under which a marriage could be established by "habit and repute" in Scotland and is illustrative of the challenges encountered in family law prior to the establishment of uniform reciprocity agreements regarding marriage recognition. Her relationships also refute the notion that free women of colour were merely mistresses and confirm that there were various types of relationships in her era that mirrored stable marriages.

== Early life ==
Dorothea Christina Thomas was born as a free woman of colour in St. George's, Grenada, on 26 June 1796 to Dorothy Kirwan and Joseph Thomas. Her mother was a former slave, who had purchased her own manumission, and was engaged in business, running a hotel. Her father was engaged in trade, providing goods between various islands in the British West Indies with his sloops, the Mary and the Jack. She was the youngest of her mother's eleven children. Thomas, who variously was called "Christina" or "Dolly", moved with her mother around 1799 to Bridgetown, Barbados, after her father died. Business competition in Barbados was high and by 1807, her family had relocated to Georgetown, in the Dutch Colony of Demerara. During the French Revolutionary Wars with Britain (1792–1802), the Dutch Empire had collapsed and to keep Demerara from falling under French influence, the British began occupying the colony in 1802, though a formal change of governance did not occur until 1814–1815.

In 1810, Thomas, her older brother Henry and more than a dozen of their cousins, were taken to Britain for schooling. The boys were enrolled at Dollar Academy near Glasgow and the girls at the Kensington House Academy in London. At the school, Thomas was trained in art and music, as well as bookkeeping, sewing and writing. She studied there for three years before returning to the Caribbean, where she joined her older sister, Ann and her husband John Gloster Garraway in Grenada. While living with them, she met John's brother Robert Garraway, a lawyer and business partner of his brother. Considered to be disreputable, he had already sired at least four illegitimate children with two different partners. Against her mother's warning, Thomas entered into a marriage contract with the younger Garraway in 1813.

== Married life ==
Drawn up by Garraway and secured by a bond of £2,000, the contract specified that he would marry Thomas "according to the rites of the Church of England" provided that he did not return to Britain before Thomas turned 21. The curious language, acknowledged that when she reached her majority, Thomas would be free to marry, as it was very unlikely that her mother would grant permission for the union while Thomas was a minor. Though her mother and each of her sisters were joined in common-law marriages, which allowed them the freedom to continue conducting business separately from their spouses and control their own monies, Thomas wanted a legally binding marriage.

Even though Grenada was a British Colony, the Marriage Act 1753, which required a ceremony performed by an authorized clergyman, did not apply outside of England. In the British West Indies, there were no laws forbidding mixed-race marriage and only on a few islands like Barbados, Montserrat, and St. Kitts, were clandestine marriages forbidden. French and English laws pertaining to people of colour in their colonies were similar, and British law in the colonies carried no punishment for marrying irregularly. Instead restrictions were placed on offspring and their ability to inherit. Illegitimacy limited the amount one could receive as a bequest, but so did the slave or free status for people of colour, as slaves were legally barred from any inheritance. The attitude toward illegitimacy was more lax outside of England, and the promise of marriage was typically sufficient to allow couples to consummate their relationships before a wedding took place.

The relationship was unsuccessful and Thomas left Garraway, moving back to Barbados, where their daughter Ann Garraway was baptised on 12 January 1816. Having left Garraway, Thomas reconciled with her mother and returned to Demerara. Thomas' mother assumed the role of caring for her granddaughter and in March 1817, set out to make arrangements for a new suitor for Christina. Though their destination was undisclosed, later documents confirm that the trip involved negotiations with a freedman in Tobago, who was offered a dowry of £5,000 should he marry Thomas. A few months later, in August 1817, Garraway returned to England to address serious financial difficulties with his creditors. By 1819, it was clear that the new suitor was not working out for Thomas and she returned to Georgetown.

By early 1819, Thomas had entered into a relationship with Captain John Gordon, a Scotsman serving in the 2nd Queen's Royal Regiment of Foot. Although John had already been married and widowed twice, the couple exchanged rings at a private ceremony in March. Dutch law, in spite of Britain having taken over the colonial administration, was still valid in Demerara and the ceremony was all that was legally required for a valid marriage. Thomas took the surname Gordon and the couple presented themselves as husband and wife in public, though John was reluctant to let his fellow soldiers know he was married. Gordon purchased furnishings for their home with an allowance provided by her mother and she managed his household and correspondence, including his regimental reports.

In 1821, John was elevated to major and in the spring of that year was recalled to Scotland. Selling the furnishings to pay for Gordon's passage, she soon joined him in Glasgow, where their son Huntly George Gordon was born on 2 August. The family relocated the following year to Chester, where Huntly was baptised. When John was transferred to Ireland that summer, she and the baby joined him in Dublin. John had promised Gordon that he would retire from the military and sell his commission, though he was forced to accept the standard price of £3,200, as his commanding officer held him in low regard. This was an inadequate amount to support his family, which included two children from his previous marriages. The couple returned to Glasgow, where they were joined in the autumn of 1823 by Gordon's mother, after she had enrolled Ann Garraway in school. John tried to persuade his mother-in-law to grant him a dowry of £10,000. She refused, offering £5,000, as she had to the previous suitor, which angered John.

Gordon was caught between her husband and her mother in the argument. John urged her to press her mother for the money. She complied but was unsuccessful. He threatened to leave her and reminded her that their marriage had not conformed to English law. Her mother agreed to pay an allowance to Gordon to support Huntly, if she left her husband. Although she preferred they leave Scotland, she agreed to pay regardless of whether they returned with her to Demerara. Fearful that he would lose his income and that she might leave with their son, John promised to formalize their marriage without a dowry as soon as his eldest son reached his majority. (Note: John's eldest son, also named John, was born in 1808, prior to his mother's death in 1811.) Reconciled, the couple moved to Edinburgh, where they lived as man and wife. They dined often with friends and John's family, though they did not go out in public together. As before, Gordon hired their servant and provided for their financial support.

In 1826, John wrote to Gordon, who was at the seaside with their son, informing her that he had met a widow who had an annual income of £300. He advised that he intended to marry the widow, emphasising that he and Gordon had never been properly married. Stressing that he was marrying only for the income, John wrote, "Do for godsake forgive and forget a man who loves you and ever shall continue to do so while in life". He offered to educate their son and provide her with passage back to Demerara. He prepared a document for her signature which confirmed that they had never been legally wed and acknowledged that their son was illegitimate. Gordon, unfamiliar with marriage laws in Scotland, sought the advice of a lawyer and was informed that if she could establish that they were married by "habit and repute" she could contest the settlement being offered. She filed an application to have her marriage and son's legitimacy verified, forcing John to file an application for his freedom.

The case was heard in the Sheriff's Court and appealed to the Court of Session, taking several years. Correspondence between the couple was presented in evidence and clearly showed the affection of John for Gordon and their son, as well as his disdain for his mother-in-law and her disregard for having her daughter respectfully wed. (Note: Gordon's mother took extraordinary precautions to ensure that each of her daughters remained independent and that their assets could not be used by their spouses. In her will she specified that her daughters' inheritances depended on the condition that the funds received were solely for her daughters' use and could not be used for claims of responsibility for the debts of any of their spouses.) Though Gordon was supported in her claims that they had been widely seen as husband and wife by landlords, servants and shopkeepers, John's friends and family swore that they believed he was a single man. The final ruling, which became an important precedent in Scottish Marriage Law, was issued in John's favour on 8 July 1829, and was based on his friends' and families' evidence. The chief justice wrote that marriage could not be established unless the reputation of the "friends, relations, and families of the parties" was considered. Having no friends or family members residing in Scotland, save one of John's brothers, Thomas Gordon, who refused to testify, Gordon's witnesses were deemed insufficient.

After losing the case, Gordon was offered an out of court settlement, which required her to leave her son in John's care and return to Demerara. She subsequently returned to the Caribbean and married a merchant in Demerara. When her mother died in 1846, Gordon's share of the inheritance was paid directly to her children, Ann and Huntly, as there would have been little left had the monies advanced during her lifetime been deducted from the inheritance. The following year, Huntly used his inheritance to marry Julia Grantham in February 1847. He later became surgeon-general in the British Army. On 15 April 1847 in Barbados, Ann married the merchant Roger Sweeney (Sweeny).

== Legacy ==
An analysis of Gordon's marriages offers insight into the variations of marital arrangements and family law in the British colonies. It shows that rather than women of colour being mistresses to white men, there was a range of different types of relationships resembling marriage. Archival evidence disputes the literary depiction that free coloured women were concubines and instead points to their ability to establish "long-lasting, stable, and apparently monogamous relationships that looked like proper marriages".
