= Margaret Essex =

English composer

Margaret Essex (1775–1807) was an English composer of chamber and vocal music. Timothy Essex was her brother.

An example of her compositions is "The Butterfly", published in The first solos: songs by women composers. Volume I: high voice. from Bryn Mawr, PA: Hildegard Publishing Company, c2000.
