= Dorothy Thomas (entrepreneur) =

Montserrat slave owner (1756–1846)

- Born: Dorothy Kirwan; 1756; Montserrat, British Leeward Islands
- Died: 5 August 1846 (aged 89–90); Georgetown, British Guiana
- Other names: Doll Thomas; Dolly Kirwan
- Occupation: Businesswoman
- Children: 11, including Dorothea Christina
- Relatives: Henrietta Catharina Florentina Simon (granddaughter); George Augustus Sala (great-grandchild)

Dorothy Thomas (also known as Dolly Kirwan or Doll Thomas; 1756 – 5 August 1846) was a Caribbean entrepreneur and former slave who engaged in business in Montserrat, Dominica, Grenada, Barbados, and Demerara. Having purchased her own manumission, Thomas spent nearly sixteen years securing the freedom of her children, mother, and several other relatives. Though she owned hotels one of which had a French restaurant, her primary source of income was hiring out female hucksters to whom she supplied goods to be sold to plantation workers and slaves. She also hired out her slaves as labourers, earned income from lodging houses, ran a plantation, and rented out properties which she owned. Known as one of the few black women who derived compensation from the government scheme to reimburse slave owners, she received £3,413 for the loss of her labourers when Britain abolished slavery.

Thomas travelled frequently to London, and ensured that her descendants were educated in Britain. Although her daughters were all partnered with prominent white businessmen, it was Thomas who kept the families afloat when they were in financial peril. She was influential among a wide circle of business and elite connections in the colonies of the British West Indies and used her networks when needed to improve her circumstances. In 1824, in London, she protested a discriminatory law against free women of colour and was successful in having it overturned by the colonial authority. She lived until 1846 and left not only a large and prominent family scattered throughout the British Empire, but a significant historical legacy which provides insight into free women of colour and their lives in her era.

== Early life ==
Dorothy Kirwan was born into slavery between 1756 and 1763 in Montserrat to Betty, a slave owned by the Kirwan family. Dorothy's owner was Andrew Kirwan, who called her "Dolly". Because she was given the family surname, raised as a Catholic, and is described in records as mulatto, despite being of black complexion, it is presumed she was fathered by a member of the Kirwan family.

Little is known of her early life before she arrived in Dominica but prior to her arrival she had given birth to three children. Though illiterate, she was known for her business acumen and insisted that her children be recorded with their correct fathers' surnames in their records for manumission. Her eldest daughter, Elizabeth Kirwan, was probably sired by Andrew Kirwan or another member of his family. Following Elizabeth was Catherina Cells, most likely the daughter of the planter John Coesvelt Cells, and Edward Iles, son of the planter Ellis Iles.

Life on Montserrat became very difficult by 1781 when during the American War of Independence the colonial authorities put an embargo on trade with the Thirteen Colonies, cutting off shipments of supplies; arable land was diminished after years of having been overworked; more than 1,200 enslaved people died of starvation; and Montserrat was hit by a disastrous hurricane. Andrew, in the wake of famine and hurricane damage on Montserrat, was in the process of moving to Demerara when Kirwan arranged for the manumission of her son Edward on 24 July 1781. About that time, she was purchased from Andrew Kirwan by William Foden, who fathered two of her children, William and Charlotte Foden. It has been understood that Kirwan paid for the two transactions and that she may have earned the money by having "the freedom to sell her person as a courtesan to the planter class". At some point, Kirwan also purchased the freedom of her two eldest daughters.

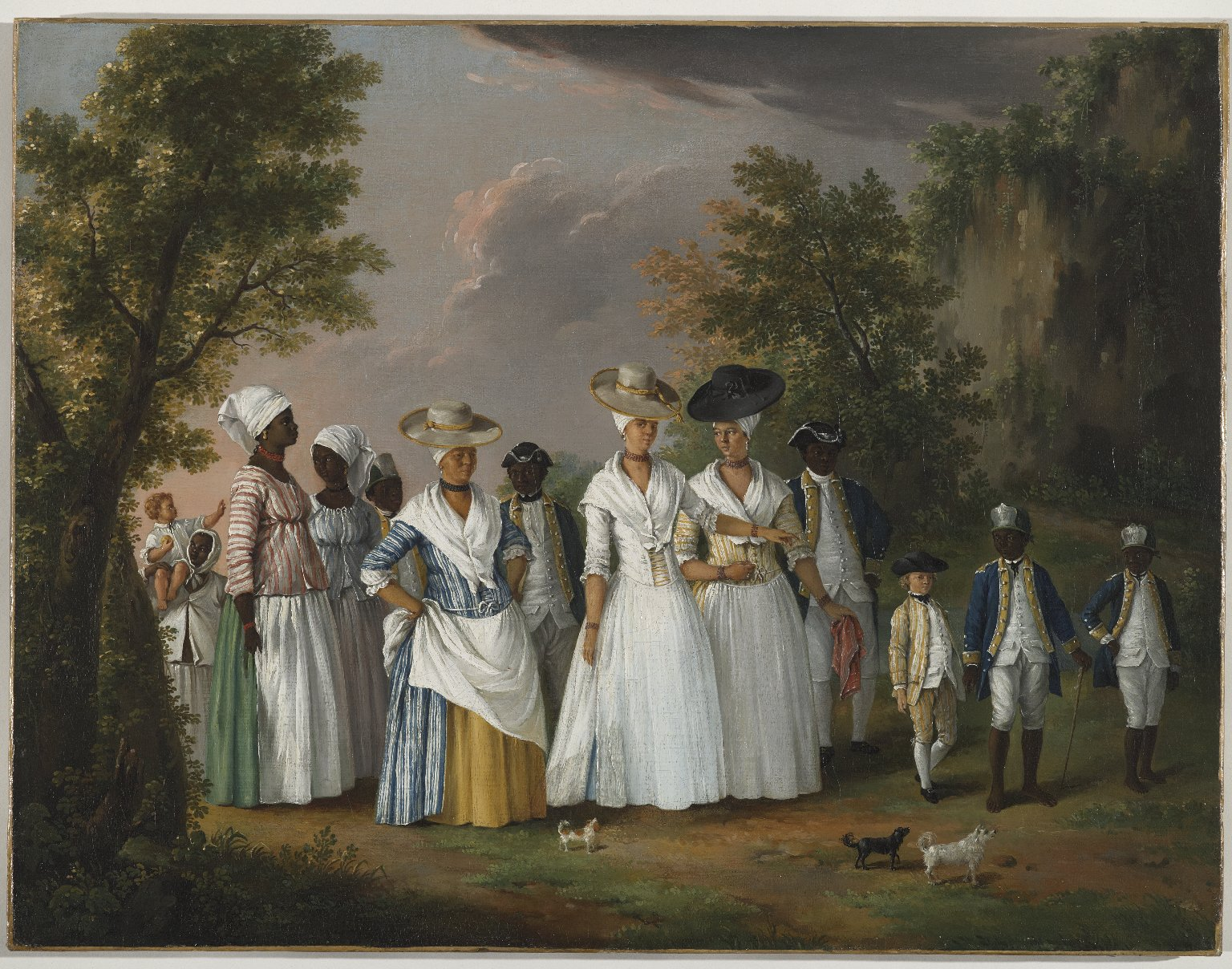
Agostino Brunias, "Free Women of Color with Their Children and Servants in a Landscape" in Dominica, ca. 1770–1796

Foden, Kirwan, and her son Edward soon left Montserrat for Dominica, where Foden worked as an estate manager and planter on the plantation owned by William Barrow, an absentee landlord from Lancaster. Foden died in 1782 and in 1784, Kirwan came before the executors of his will to secure her inheritance. Under the provisions of the will, she was left his household goods and one-third of his livestock. She was discharged from any debts she might owe him and the will specified that she had paid to him money to manumit herself and her three children, William, Charlotte, and a baby, Ann (also known as Nan), who was the daughter of Joseph Thomas, a minor merchant. The executors, Thomas Brayshaw and Charles Bates, on agreeing to grant Kirwan and her children their freedom, prepared a formal deed of manumission, which was witnessed on 10 July 1784 by Joseph Thomas and Alexander Fraser.

Joseph Thomas, who owned a 1/4 interest in a merchant vessel, the Mary, engaged in inter-island trade from Grenada. While he was the most significant partner in Kirwan's life, theirs was not an exclusive relationship. Around 1785–1786, she gave birth to another daughter, Francis "Fanny" Owens, probably the daughter of John Owens, the skipper of Nelly, a sloop co-owned by Foden's former employer, William Barrow. In August 1786, Joseph had returned to Dominica and witnessed a deed of manumission for Kirwan on a slave named Sally, who may have been Kirwan's grandmother. Purchasing an interest in a second trading sloop, the Jack, Joseph, Kirwan, and her family moved to Grenada in March 1787.

== Grenada 1787–1799 ==
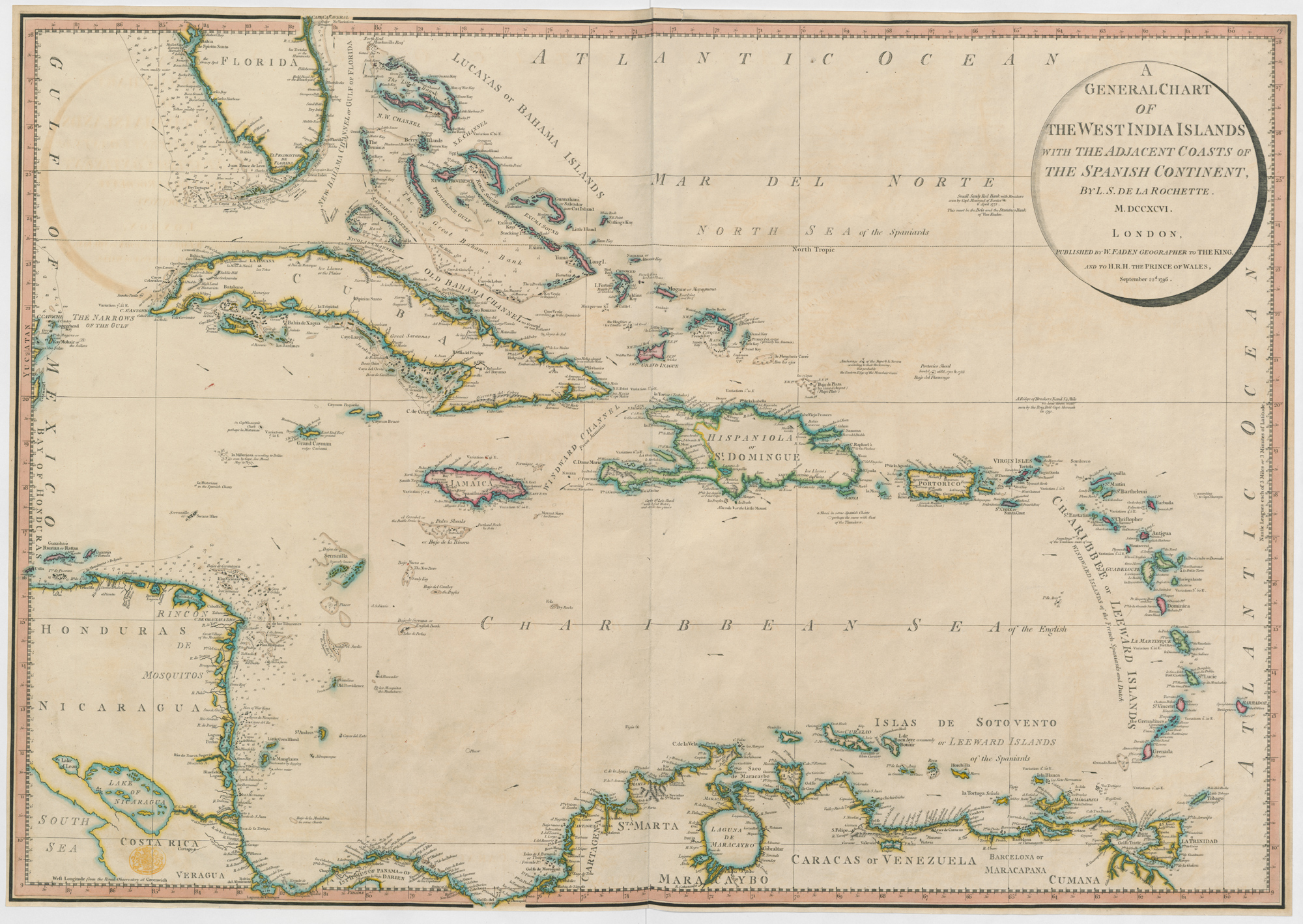
1796 map depicting the Caribbean Islands, by Louis Stanislaw de la Rochette

According to available records in Grenada, Kirwan was engaged in business and operated independently from Joseph, signing her own transactions with her mark. Though it is unclear whether she had a shop, or employed hucksters there, she owned a hotel in St. George's, Grenada and may have had other business ventures. She had four more children with Thomas, who were baptized in the Anglican Church records: Eliza (1787), Joseph (1789), Harry (1790), and Christina (1796). Each was recorded as the child of Joseph and Kirwan, "a free mulattress", none being noted as natural or illegitimate. It may well be that Joseph and Kirwan had a marital contract, though due to social conventions it would have been impossible for them to exchange public marriage vows. Kirwan also took the precaution of having her family members' manumissions inscribed in the records in Grenada to ensure that their status was not in doubt in the colony.

During the French Revolutionary Wars, Joseph's business suffered. His ship Mary and her cargo were seized as a war prize in 1794, and his ship Jack sank in 1797. As his fortunes declined, Kirwan's were rising. At the conclusion of Fédon's rebellion, she stressed her ties to her English husband and quietly buried her own Catholicism. As the insurrection was led by French-speaking free coloureds, it was widely seen as a revolt against the British colonial administration of Grenada. The Grenada Assembly and the governor increasingly implemented measures to expel freed slaves, specifically targeting free women of colour. Recognizing that the political climate might be turning against her, in October 1797 Kirwan manumitted her mother. Though she remained in Grenada for a couple of years after Joseph's death, probably in 1799, Kirwan moved to Bridgetown, Barbados.

== Barbados 1799–1807 ==
Barbados was a logical choice, because Kirwan had contacts there. Her daughters Elizabeth and Ann had married and were living there, as was her sister Henrietta Moore, and John Owens, the ship captain who had fathered Kirwan's daughter Fannie. Bridgetown was the home of the British Caribbean fleet and war offered opportunities for business, though competition from other free coloured women like, Suzy Austin, Nancy Clarke, and Betsy Lemon would have limited Kirwan's prospects. Looking further afield, she began to search for better possibilities, such as the Dutch Colony of Demerara, where by 1800 two-thirds of the white population were British, many from Barbados. Immigration of free coloured people to Demerara was also increasing from throughout the British West Indies, as a result of the collapse of the Dutch Republic in 1795 and British occupation to prevent the colony falling into French hands. Though the colony was returned to the Dutch, it was reoccupied in 1803 by the British and formally transitioned to British rule between 1814 and 1815. Taking advantage of the opportunities offered in Demerara, Kirwan's daughter Catherina had moved there in the 1790s, followed in 1802 and 1805 by her daughters Charlotte and Eliza.

== Demerara 1807–1846 ==
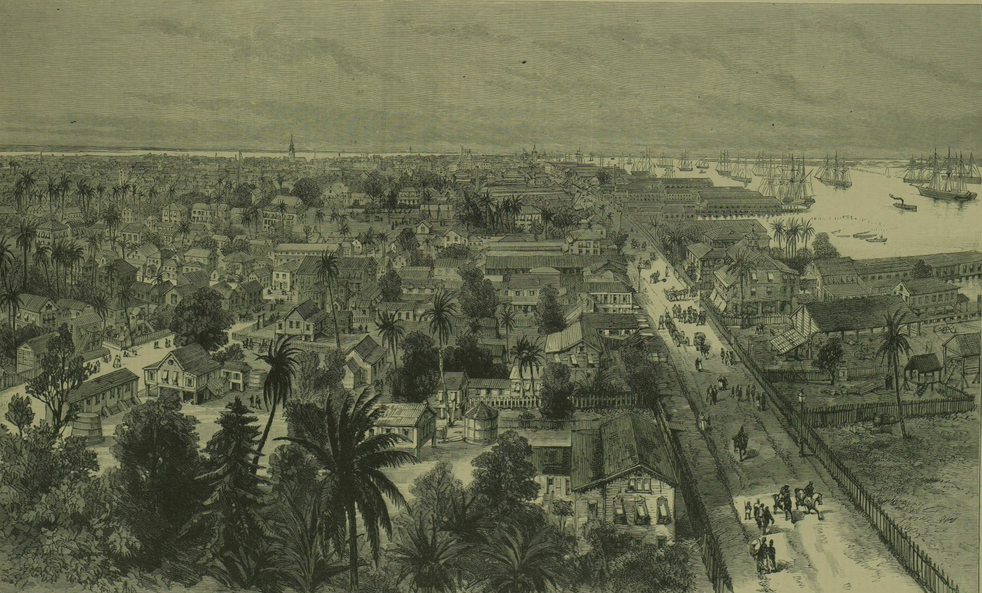
Georgetown, Demerara, 1888

Kirwan had moved to Demerara by 1807 and initially was known by that surname, but after 1808, she insisted on being called Mrs. Thomas. She set up a rooming house near Werk-en-rust, a plantation on the southern edge of Georgetown. Within a year, she moved to the northern edge of Georgetown, to a new neighbourhood known as Cumingsburg, a fashionable and growing area adjacent to the plantation owned by Thomas Cuming. She bought several lots there and paid taxes in 1808 for 16 slaves. Notices in the Demerara Gazette indicate that she offered lodging and employed her slaves as hucksters. The closed plantation system, under which the estate provided for all the needs of its inhabitants, had ceased to exist when the British began occupying the colony at the end of the 18th century. Instead, plantation owners' orders for goods, typically made once or twice a year, were supplemented by provisions brought by travelling peddlers. As the inhabitants were thinly spread across the colony, shops were impractical, and hucksters were an essential part of the society.

Thomas was able to use her white sons-in-law to obtain supplies on credit for her hucksters, sending them out to the countryside to peddle their goods. Her business became very profitable, though occasionally she posted notices for runaway slaves who had absconded with her goods. Many of her hucksters were women, but advertisements for services she provided included hiring out male slaves as boatmen, carpenters or painters; women as housekeepers, nursemaids and seamstresses; and leasing out properties she owned in and around Georgetown. By 1810, she was quite wealthy and travelled to England where she took her youngest children, Henry and Christina, along with 17 of her grandchildren to enroll in school. While the girls attended Kensington House Academy, a finishing school in London for which Thomas served as benefactor, the boys were enrolled in the Dollar Academy near Glasgow. That year, Thomas moved again, this time to the most fashionable street in Georgetown, Robb Street.

By 1815, Thomas was running the plantation Kensington, formerly owned by her son Joseph, along with her daughter Charlotte and son-in-law, Gilbert Robertson. Her largest hotel, which had a cistern capable of holding 5,000 or more gallons of water, began employing a French chef, Louis le Plat, in 1817 and that same year, she purchased a live lion from Africa as an amusement for her guests. Local newspapers reported on her activities of purchases and sales of properties near the port, and as far away as Mahaica and the nearby colony of Berbice. In 1819, she organized a reception for Stapleton Cotton, 1st Viscount Combermere, the Governor of Barbados. By the second decade of the 19th century, Thomas regularly travelled abroad with servants and was known as one of the wealthiest persons in the colony. In 1820, she owned 83 slaves and while her business was prospering, her white sons-in-law were frequently in need of financial assistance, which she provided, though at times grudgingly. The sons-in-law were subject to accruing debt to secure merchandise for overseas trade and ran the risk of having shipments seized by privateers during periods of war; whereas Thomas' income was stable and property based.

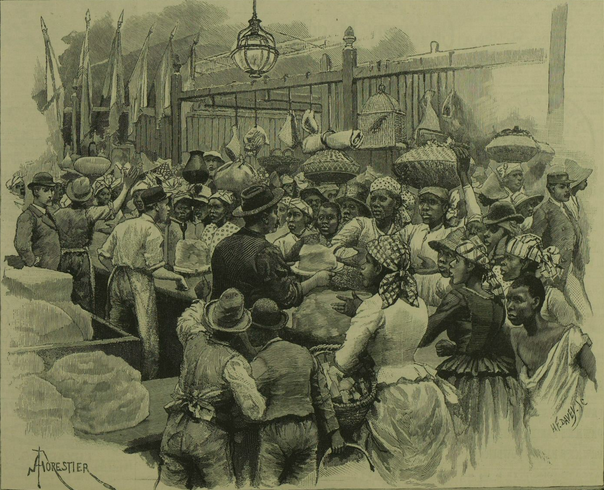
Amédée Forestier, "Georgetown Market", 1888

Although she had taken measures to manumit her own family, Thomas is not known to have ever manumitted a slave that she owned who was not kin. Her slave count remained at around 80, even during the slave rebellion of 1823. The following year, she journeyed to England to press the claims of a group of free women of colour who had unsuccessfully petitioned the Court of Policy to reduce the tax on hucksters. Freedwomen had long paid separate taxes, which freedmen were not required to pay as they served military duty and performed other civic services, but a new head tax imposed in 1823 was considered unfair. The women lamented in their petition that competition had increased in the colony and that the new tax exempted free coloured men, slaves, and whites. In 1824, various accounts report she went to England and called upon Lord Bathurst, Colonial Secretary, demanding that the tax be repealed. Her efforts were successful and when she returned to Demarara, she was presented with a silver cup and plate by well-to-do women of colour. When slavery was abolished in 1833 she participated in the government compensation scheme for loss of her labour and recovered £3,413, equivalent to £400,000 in 2025, according to calculations based on retail price index measure of inflation, the largest amount paid to a freedwoman in Demerara.

Thomas survived the yellow fever epidemic which hit the area in 1837 and continued to use her influential business networks for the rest of her life. She was well respected, as in spite of her illiteracy, she was able to converse on a wide variety of topics with many distinguished people. She died on 5 August 1846 in Georgetown, leaving extensive bequests to her relatives. The will implies that the only children who survived her were Catherina, Ann, Harry, and Christina and the witnesses to the will and codiciles "read like a roll call of influential white men in the colony". For each of her heirs, she reduced their inheritance based on funds she had distributed to them during her lifetime, meaning that Catherina received only clothes and table linens, while Harry and Ann received a full sixth of her estate. Christina's share went directly to her children, noting that she had already received funds in the past. The remainder of the estate was divided among her grandchildren and great-grandchildren, again taking into consideration whether Thomas had already expended funds on their behalf.

== Legacy ==
=== Historical significance ===
In her lifetime, Dorothy Thomas was a legendary figure and many apocryphal stories were written about her, including accounts of visits to both houses of Parliament and a personal audience with George IV. She lived in an era when war opened opportunities to free women of colour, but threw them back into obscurity when it ended. Thomas' life is illustrative of the difficult and complex society that existed in the British Caribbean. It offers significant insight into the system of slavery and manumissions, as well as the difficulties and success she faced as a free woman of colour and a business woman. The fact that she was able to be successful in multiple colonies shows her ability to use the fluidity of changing times to her advantage.

=== Family ===
Thomas' family tree stretched in a broad swathe across the British Empire and many of them became notable in their own right, thanks in part to the education she provided for her descendants. They include actors, journalists, merchants, physicians, and planters. Elizabeth Kirwan, a free woman of colour, entered into a common-law marriage prior to 1794 in Grenada with John Coxall, son of the British merchant John Cavalero Coxall. Coxall was a member of a large and influential, Scottish merchant family, and heir to their business enterprises. The couple had six children in Grenada: "James, Jane, Dorethea, William, Charlotte, and Ann".

Catherina Cells, also a free woman, married the Demerara planter D. P. Simon by 1793 and had at least six children with him. One of their daughters, Henrietta Catharina Simon, married Augustus John James Sala, performed on the London stage as Madame Sala, and was the mother of Augusta, Frederick, Charles, Albert, and George Augustus Sala, a Victorian journalist.

Edward Isles died in Grenada in 1792 and his brother William Foden disappeared from the record books. Charlotte Foden partnered with the merchant John Fullerton and by 1802 was living in Demerara. Their sister, Ann Thomas, was the common-law wife of John Gloster Garraway, who served in Grenada as the Master of the Court of Chancery. Ann's son, Joseph Garraway, trained in law in Scotland, returned to the Caribbean, and was appointed as a magistrate in 1836. He later served as a judge in the Court of Appeal.

Fanny Owens remained in Grenada, conducting business there, but Eliza Thomas relocated to Demerara, where she became the wife of Gilbert Robertson in 1805. Robertson was a partner in Robertson, Sandbach and Parker, one of the dominant trading companies in the Caribbean at the time, and a cousin of Anne Mackenzie Robertson, wife of Sir John Gladstone, a Jamaican planter, parents of British Prime Minister William Ewart Gladstone. Eliza and Gilbert were probably the parents of Ann, an infant who died in 1806, and had a son, Henry Robertson, who became a licensed apothecary in 1828 and later had a successful surgical practice in London.

Joseph Thomas died in Demerara in 1815, though his brother Harry Thomas survived their mother. Christina, also known as Dorothea Christina, contracted to marry Robert Garraway, brother of her sister Ann's husband John, in Demerara in 1813. The nature of the contract held that if Garraway returned to England before Christina attained 21 years old the marriage was null and void. The couple had a daughter Ann Garraway, who was baptized in 1816 in Barbados, before Garraway returned to England, reneging on the contract to marry. In 1819, Christina returned to Demerara and contracted a marriage arrangement with Major John Gordon. When he returned to Scotland with his regiment in 1821, she followed and gave birth that year to their son, Huntly George Gordon, who became surgeon-general in the British Army.

== In popular culture ==
Thomas is the protagonist of Vanessa Riley's 2021 novel Island Queen.

== See also ==
- Elizabeth Swain Bannister
- Amaryllis Collymore
- Susannah Ostrehan
- Rachael Pringle Polgreen
