= Milestone Hotel =

Five-star hotel in London, United Kingdom

The Milestone Hotel
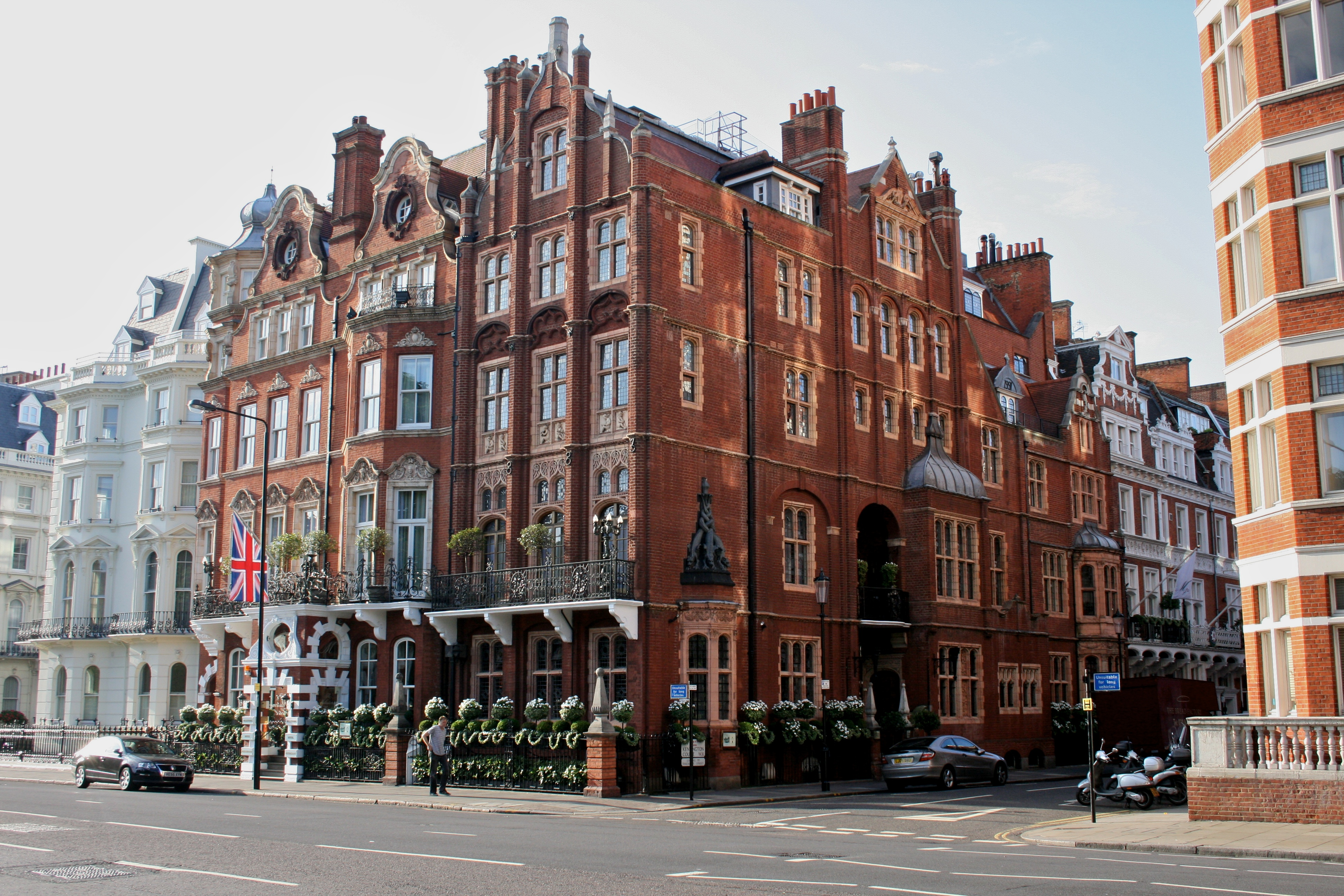
- Interactive map of the The Milestone Hotel area

General information
- Location: 1 Kensington Court, Kensington, London, W8 5DL, United Kingdom
- Coordinates: 51°30′07″N 0°11′12″W
- Opened: 1922
- Management: Red Carnation Hotels Group

Other information
- Number of rooms: 62

Website
- www.milestonehotel.com

The Milestone Hotel is a five-star hotel at 1 Kensington Court, Kensington, London, United Kingdom. It overlooks Kensington Gardens.

It was originally built as a house in 1884, in part of the grounds of the now-demolished Kensington House. John Freeman-Mitford, 1st Baron Redesdale lived there. It was converted into a hotel in 1922 and combined with 2 Kensington Court, which had been home to John Athelstone Riley, grandson of the founder of the Union Bank.

The hotel has 44 guest bedrooms, 12 suites, and six long-stay apartments. It is part of the Red Carnation Hotels Group. It is a member of The Leading Hotels of the World marketing organisation.

The two former terraced houses that make up the hotel are each listed Grade II on the National Heritage List for England.
