= The Mysteries of Verbena House =

Pornographic novel of flagellation erotica

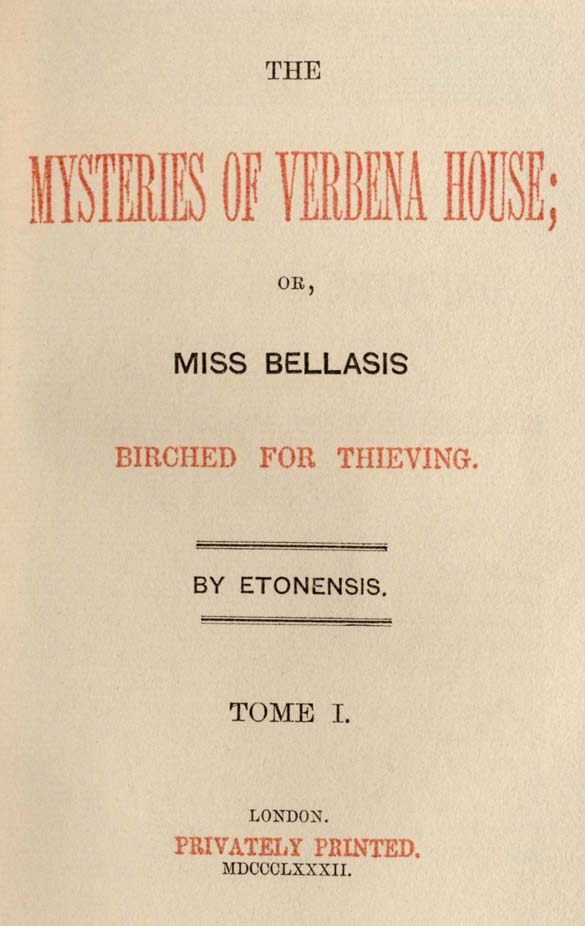
- Title page for The Mysteries of Verbena House, or, Miss Bellasis Birched for Thieving (1882)
- Author: George Augustus Sala
- Language: English
- Genre: Pornographic novel
- Publication date: 1882
- Publication place: Great Britain
- Media type: Print (Hardcover)

The Mysteries of Verbena House, or, Miss Bellasis Birched for Thieving is a pornographic novel of flagellation erotica set in a girls' school, written under the pseudonym Etonensis by George Augustus Sala and completed by James Campbell Reddie (co-author of The Sins of the Cities of the Plain). It was published in 1882 in a limited edition of 150 copies at the price of 4 guineas.

== Content ==
The book is set at Verbena House, an exclusive girls' school in Brighton, and concerns the flogging of a schoolgirl called Miss Bellasis, who has stolen two gold coins from another pupil. Whilst searching for the missing coins through the pupils' desks, two other schoolgirls are found in possession of incriminating material: Miss Hazletine has hidden away a bottle of gin and Miss Hatherton has in her possession a pornographic book. The headmistress, Miss Sinclair, is at first reluctant to flog the girls for their misdemeanours but defers to the wisdom in these matters of the German and French teachers and of her spiritual advisor the Rev. Arthur Calvedon. The latter relates his experiences of flogging at Eton and wishes to witness the birching of Miss Bellasis. According to the Victorian pornographer Henry Spencer Ashbee, it is this point that the hand of another author is detectable and the action becomes more explicit: "the castigation of Miss Bellasis is described at great, perhaps too great length" and the erstwhile maidenly headmistress who "was not by any means a flogging school-mistress" is transformed into "the lascivious lady of Verbena House". After the flogging the headmistress discovers she is greatly excited and has sex with the clergyman. The next day Miss Hazletine and Miss Hatherton are punished, first with a riding whip and then with a hair brush as the clergyman watches the proceedings though a spy-hole.

It is notable that much attention is lavished, in the book, on women's underwear, in which the author expresses great interest and which Ashbee hopes will have historical interest to future readers. In Ashbee's judgement the book (or the first part of it at least) is "acceptable, nay even entertaining" and "one of the best books of its kind".

== See also ==
- Sadism and masochism in fiction
- BDSM in culture and media
