= Kensington House (academy) =

Coordinates: 51°30′7.53″N 0°11′11.46″W

Kensington House was an academy established by 1756 in Kensington, London, England. The school was operated by a variety of people until about 1813 or 1815. After being operated as a Catholic boarding house from 1815 to 1825, it then became the site of a private asylum in 1830.

Kensington House was built along with Colby House, for Sir Thomas Colby, 1st Baronet. They were located off Kensington High Street and near the main entrance to Kensington Palace, across from Hyde Park and Kensington Gardens. Now, mansions have been built on the two sites in the area called Kensington Court.

== Background ==
External images
- Diagram of Colby Court, Kensington House, and Kensington Court
- Old Kensington Court
- Kensington House, 1776

Sir Thomas Colby, 1st Baronet built Kensington House between 1688 and 1692. It was likely built in a double-pile (a central-passage house) layout with narrow late-17th-century type windows. It was occupied by Foot Onslow until about 1698.

George Davenant, the son of Sir William Davenant, lived at Kensington House from 1699 to 1706 or later. An officer in the Royal Bodyguard, he was the ratepayer until 1710, when he died. At the time of Davenant's death, though, his residence was in St Martin-in-the Fields. The house was inhabited by the godmother of Davenant's son, Lady Susan Belasyse, Baroness Belasyse of Osgodby before 1710 and then it was inhabited at least three years by antiquarian John Bowack, until his death in 1713. (Note: The source says "her death", but Bowack was a man who was made Sir John Bowack.)

William Lord Berkeley, a beneficiary of Baroness Belasyse's estate, inherited the house with the receipt of deeds in 1714 and 1716. In 1731, he sold it to Mary Edwards of Welham, Leicestershire for £4,000. Situated on more than three acres, the property included the house that had been enlarged, as well as a coach-house, stables, a summer house, a barn, a brewhouse, a greenhouse, and a water house. With the property was an enclosed ten-acre garden. The estate was owned by Edwards, who resided there, and her descendants for seventy years. From 1746 to 1755, Count Petr Grigorevich Chernyshev, the Russian Ambassador in London lived there with his wife and two daughters.

== Academy ==
The school was operated by James Elphinstone, a Scottish educationalist, from 1756 to March 1776, as a boys' school. The school may have operated continuously from that time until 1802 when the property was sold by Sir Gerard Noel, 2nd Baronet, the grandson of Mary Edwards, to Thomas Wetherell of Hammersmith, London.

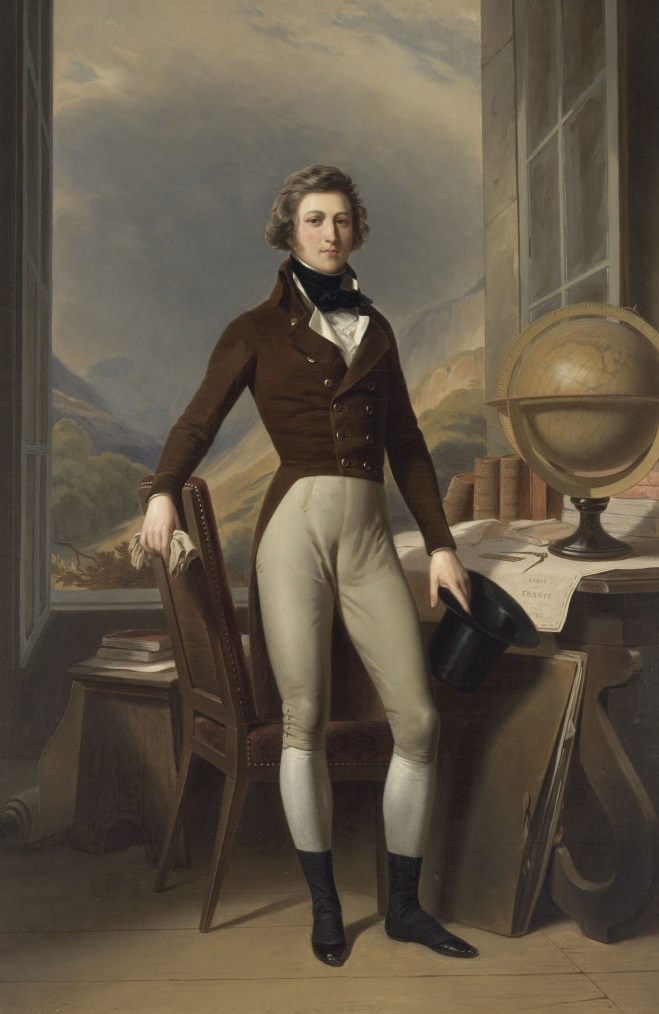
During his exile, Louis Philippe was a teacher of geography, history, mathematics and modern languages, at a boys' boarding school in Reichenau, Switzerland.

Prince Charles Victor de Broglio, a French émigré nobleman and cleric, leased the building for a French Jesuit school. The head of the academy, he operated to academy to cater to the children of French aristocrats that lived in London during the French Revolution. One of the ushers was the future King Louis Philippe I, son of Charles X of France, who visited the school on one occasion. West Indian planters also sent their children to the school. Among students from the Caribbean were many of the children and grandchildren of Dorothy Thomas, including her daughter Dorothea Christina and granddaughter Henrietta Simon Sala. Richard Lalor Sheil, the Irish politician and dramatist, attended the school from 1802 to 1804. In 1806, Rev. Monsieur de Theil took over the lease. Melchier Strickler then leased the building in 1813.

== Boarding house ==
Antonio Salterelli and his widowed mother Jane operated a Catholic boarding establishment, with a house chapel, from 1815 to 1825. Their residents included the actor and author Elizabeth Inchbald, who lived there from 1819 until her death in August 1821. Inchbald had described Kensington House as "extremely genteel and cheerful, changing however too frequently for perfect cordiality and the formation of intimacy." Artist Richard Cosway and his artist wife Maria Cosway lived there for several months. In 1825 Mrs Salterelli was made bankrupt and in December was in the Fleet prison as an insolvent debtor <London Gazette, 1825, p. 2114>. She died in 1826 aged 62

== Asylum ==
From 1825 to 1830, the building had no tenant listed in the rate books, but was marked "as in private tenure". After sitting empty since 1825, the building became a private asylum in 1827 or 1830. Treating nervous conditions and insanity, it was operated by William Finch of Madeley Villa. In 1838, Richard Paternoster, a former civil servant in the East India Company, stayed 41 days in William Finch's asylum at Kensington House having been detained following a disagreement with his father over money. James Hill (father of Octavia Hill) was a Wisbech corn merchant, banker, proprietor of the newspaper the Star of the East and founder of the United Advancement Society. He had been declared bankrupt and had been committed to Kensington House Asylum. After his release in 1851 the Alleged Lunatics' Friend Society helped him sue the proprietor of Kensington House, Dr Francis Philps, for wrongful confinement but the case was unsuccessful.

== Grant House ==
External image
- Kensington House that was built in the 1870s for Albert Grant

Colby House and Kensington House were demolished in 1872 for the construction of a house for Albert Grant that cost about £250,000. Due to financial difficulties, it was sold for just a little more than £10,000, and was demolished in 1883. Although construction had been completed, it was never occupied.

== See also ==
- Milestone Hotel, built on the former site of Colby House and Kensington House
