= Timothy Essex =

English composer

Timothy Essex (1765?–1847) was an English composer.

== Life ==
Essex was born in or about 1765 at Coventry, Warwickshire, the son of Timothy Essex there; Margaret Essex was his sister. He began playing on the flute and violin at age 13, for his own amusement, and his father let him study music as a profession. In 1786 he established himself as a teacher of the pianoforte, organ, and flute. In order to better his position he matriculated at Oxford as a member of Magdalen Hall 10 December 1806, and took the degree of bachelor of music on the following 17 December. He proceeded doctor of music 2 December 1812.

Essex was known as a teacher, and obtained some popularity as a composer. His 'Musical Academy' was at 38 Hill Street, Berkeley Square; he was also organist, composer to, and director of the choir of St George's Chapel, Albemarle Street. He died 27 September 1847, aged 82, in York Buildings, New Road, London.

== Works ==
Among his works are:

- Eight English Canzonetts for a Single Voice (1800).
- A Grand Military Sonata for the Pianoforte, with an accompaniment ad libitum for a violin (1800).
- Six Duets for Flutes or Violins (1801?).
- Eight Lessons and Four Sonatinas on a Peculiar Plan, intended to establish a proper method of fingering on the pianoforte (1802).
- Six Canzonets, the words from the poems of the late Mrs. Robinson (1804).
- Introduction and Fugue for the Organ (1812).
- Harmonia Sacra. being a collection of sacred melodies for the 150 Psalms of David (1830?).

Essex also published a set of slow and quick marches for the pianoforte, with the full scores added for a military band, a variety of rondos for the pianoforte, and pianoforte and flute, and many single songs.
