= The Darkened Room =

Book by Alex Owen

The Darkened Room: Women, Power and Spiritualism in Late Victorian England
- The first edition cover of the book.
- Author: Alex Owen
- Language: English
- Subject: History of religion
- Publisher: Virago
- Publication date: 1989
- Publication place: United Kingdom
- Media type: Print (Hardcover & Paperback)
- Pages: 307
- ISBN: 978-0-86068-567-8

The Darkened Room: Women, Power and Spiritualism in Late Victorian England is a historical study into the role played by women in the Spiritualist religious movement in England during the latter part of the 19th century. It was written by the British historian Alex Owen and first published in 1989 by Virago, before being republished in 2004 by the University of Chicago Press.

A work of feminist history which arose from Owen's PhD thesis undertaken at the University of Sussex, The Darkened Room looks at the role of women in the Spiritualist movement of the period, counterbalancing what Owen perceived as a former focus on the role of men.

== Background ==
=== Owen and her research ===
The basis to The Darkened Room came from Owen's PhD thesis, undertaken at the University of Sussex. Exploring "the idea of femininity as a social construct", she initially planned to focus her thesis on the manner in which Victorian medical science played in reinforcing "a feminine norm", but in doing so came upon the case of Louisa Lowe, a woman who appeared in front of the Parliamentary Select Committee in 1887, claiming that she had been wrongly incarcerated in a mental asylum by her husband because she was a Spiritualist. Fascinated by the relationship between this Spiritualist movement and women in Late Victorian England, she decided to refocus her doctorate on this topic instead.

"One of the underpinning themes of this book remains... that of femininity: the way in which spiritualist women were constructed as 'natural' mediums, the 'innate' femininity which allowed women to accede to positions of power but which then trapped them within a limiting self-definition, the transgressive femininity which emerged during some of the more extraordinary séances, and the hostility aroused by the spectacle of femininity gone awry."

— Alex Owen in her Introduction, 1989.

Highlighting that the majority of scholarly work on the subject of Spiritualism had focused on male members of the religion, she decided to take a feminist approach to the subject by focusing on the women. Deciding to explore "issues of power and subversion", she adopted the definition of "power" provided by the famous French philosopher Michel Foucault (1926–1984). Owen took as her primary source material the published tracts, personal accounts and newsletters of the Late Victorian Spiritualist movement, noting that W.H. Harrison's Spiritualist and James Burns' Human Nature and Medium Daybreak proved to be "the most useful, enlightening and engaging." A non-Spiritualist, Owen admitted that she could not explain many of the accounts of spirits which appeared in the records of Spiritualist séances.

Following the completion of her thesis, Owen moved to the United States, taking up a Research Fellowship at the University of California, San Diego from 1983 until 1986 and then a position as a Research Associate and Visiting Lecturer in the Women's Program in Religion at the Harvard Divinity School from 1986 until 1987, funded by the Rockefeller Foundation. It was while working in these positions that she wrote up her thesis as The Darkened Room.

== Reception ==
=== Press reviews ===
The Darkened Room was reviewed by Dinah Birch for the London Review of Books. Birch noted that by the 1980s, Spiritualism had been "bundled out of sight, like a batty old aunt at a family gathering", ignoring the importance that it had held in Victorian society. Describing Owen's work as "solid and compelling", she highlighted a number of its arguments.
