= St Luke's Church, Brislington =

Church in Bristol, England

The Parish Church of St Luke The Evangelist
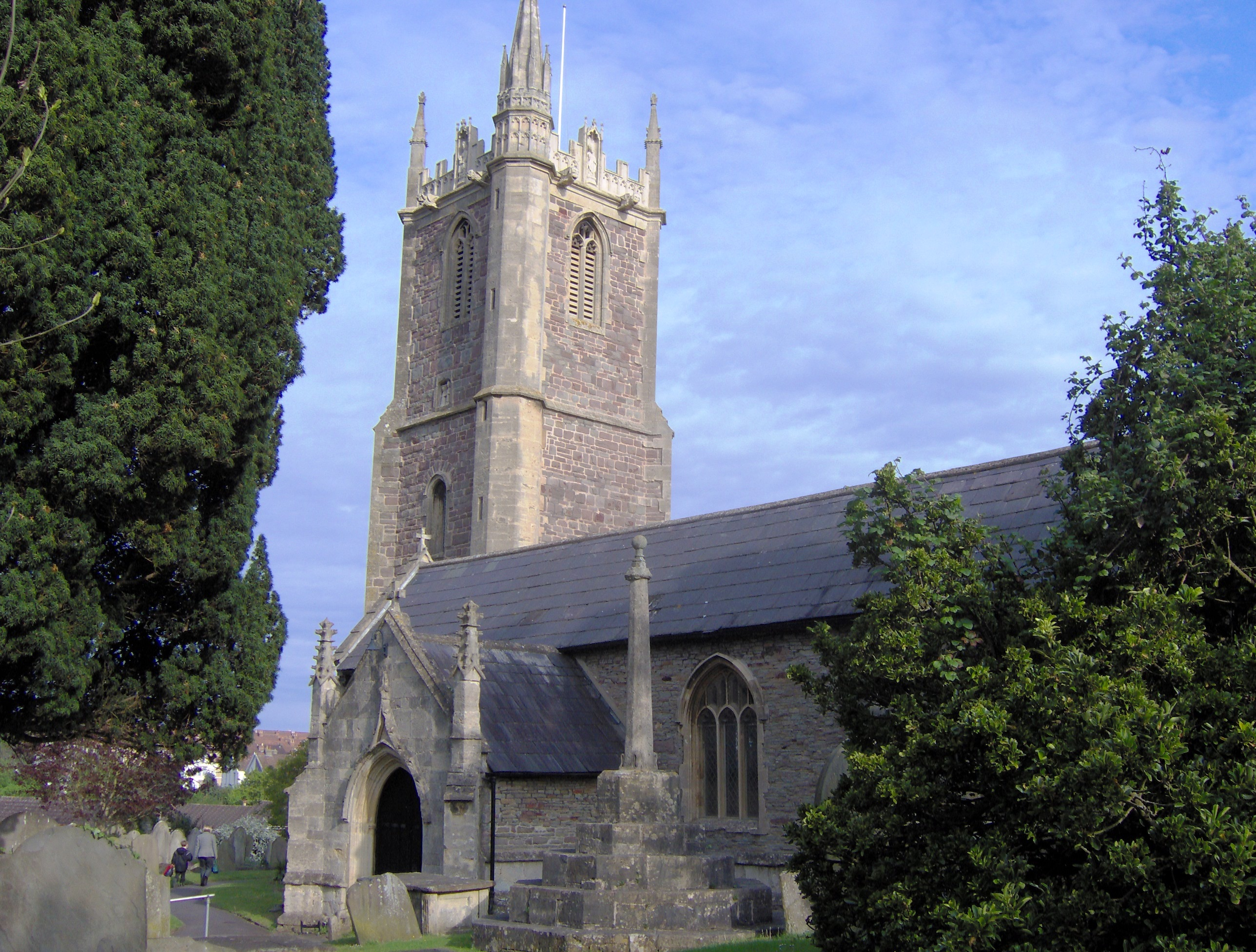

- Location within Bristol

General information
- Location: Bristol, England
- Coordinates: 51.4349°N 2.5466°W
- Completed: 15th century

The Parish Church of St Luke The Evangelist (grid reference ST621708) Church Parade, Brislington area of Bristol, England.

== History ==
St Luke's Church was built in the 15th century, which is believed to have been founded by Thomas la Warr in around 1420. with the north arcade and aisle being remodelled in 1819, and the east end in 1874 by Benjamin Ferrey. It includes a bell dating from 1766 and made by Thomas Bilbie of the Bilbie family.

The Grade II Village Cross (aka Market Cross) was moved to the churchyard, at sometime certainly before 1880, and can be seen in the image of the church.

It has been designated by English Heritage as a grade II* listed building.

== See also ==
- Churches in Bristol
- Grade II* listed buildings in Bristol
