= Brislington =

Area in southeast Bristol, UK

Coordinates: 51.4316°N 2.5439°W

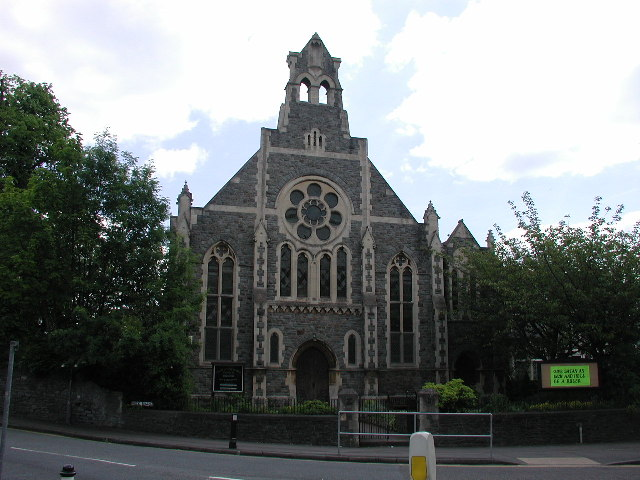
- United Reformed Church

- Location within Bristol
- Population: 11,511 (2011.Wards)(East); 10,636 (West)
- OS grid reference: ST622704
- Unitary authority: Bristol
- Region: South West
- Country: England
- Sovereign state: United Kingdom
- Post town: BRISTOL
- Postcode district: BS4
- Dialling code: 0117
- Police: Avon and Somerset
- Fire: Avon
- Ambulance: South Western
- UK Parliament: Bristol East

Brislington (historically, sometimes Busleton) (Note: Brislington is spelled in some 17th- and 18th-century sources as "Busleton", often printed with the long 's' as "Buſleton".) is an area in the south east of the city of Bristol, England. It is on the edge of Bristol and 10 miles (16 km) from Bath. Brislington Brook runs through the area in the woodlands of Nightingale Valley and St Anne's Wood. Brislington formerly housed the HTV West Studios on Bath Road, and this is situated next to the historic Arnos Vale Cemetery. Other notable landmarks include Brislington House and the 15th-century St Luke's Church. During the 18th–19th century, Brislington was regarded as a picturesque country village and contained many country homes.

For elections to Bristol City Council, the area is divided between Brislington East and Brislington West electoral wards. It is in the Bristol East parliamentary constituency.

== History ==
The parish of Brislington was historically part of the Keynsham Hundred in Somerset.

Brislington is also near to the site of the now demolished chapel of St. Anne's-in-the Wood (actually in nearby St Anne's), erected by one of the Lords de la Warr, whose family held the manor of Brislington from the late 12th to the mid-16th century; in the 15th century the chapel was a place of pilgrimage, visited by Henry VII. After the chapel was demolished following the Dissolution of the Monasteries, Thomas Amory built a house called "St. Ann's" at the site in the mid-17th century. During the 18th and 19th century, Brislington contained many country homes due to its reputation as a picturesque country village. It was also a notable centre of the making of brightly coloured English delftware pottery.

Brislington House (now known as Long Fox Manor) was built as a private lunatic asylum for the insane. When it opened in 1806 it was one of England's first purpose built asylums. The Palladian fronted building was originally seven separate blocks into which patients were allocated depending on their class. The buildings, estate and therapeutic regime designed by Edward Long Fox was based on the principles of moral treatment which was fashionable at the time. Brislington House later influenced the design and construction of other asylums and influenced Act of parliament. The house and ancillary structures are listed buildings which have now been converted into private residences. The original grounds are Grade II* listed on the Register of Historic Parks and Gardens of special historic interest in England and now include St. Brendan's Sixth Form College, sports pitches and some farmland. They are now included on the Heritage at Risk Register.

In 1866, Brislington became a civil parish. By the early 20th century it was encompassed by Bristol, and much urban housing and industry developed. On 1 April 1933, the civil parish was abolished and absorbed into Bristol. In 1931 the parish had a population of 4279.

Churches in Brislington include St Luke's (which dates from the 15th century) and includes a bell dating from 1766 and made by Thomas Bilbie of the Bilbie family, St Cuthberts, Carmel Christian Centre, St Christophers and the United Reformed Church. The Village Cross (aka Market Cross) was moved to St Luke's churchyard some uncertain time before the 1880s.

The Bristol and North Somerset Railway (later the Great Western Railway) had a station at Brislington, which linked the city with the towns of the Somerset coalfield. The line opened in 1873 and was closed to passenger traffic in 1959, with freight services withdrawn in the mid-1960s.

The early 19th-century Arnos Vale Cemetery is undergoing restoration after a lengthy public and newspaper campaign.

In the early 21st century, Brislington's paint works was converted to studios, offices and houses, home to arts and media organisations.

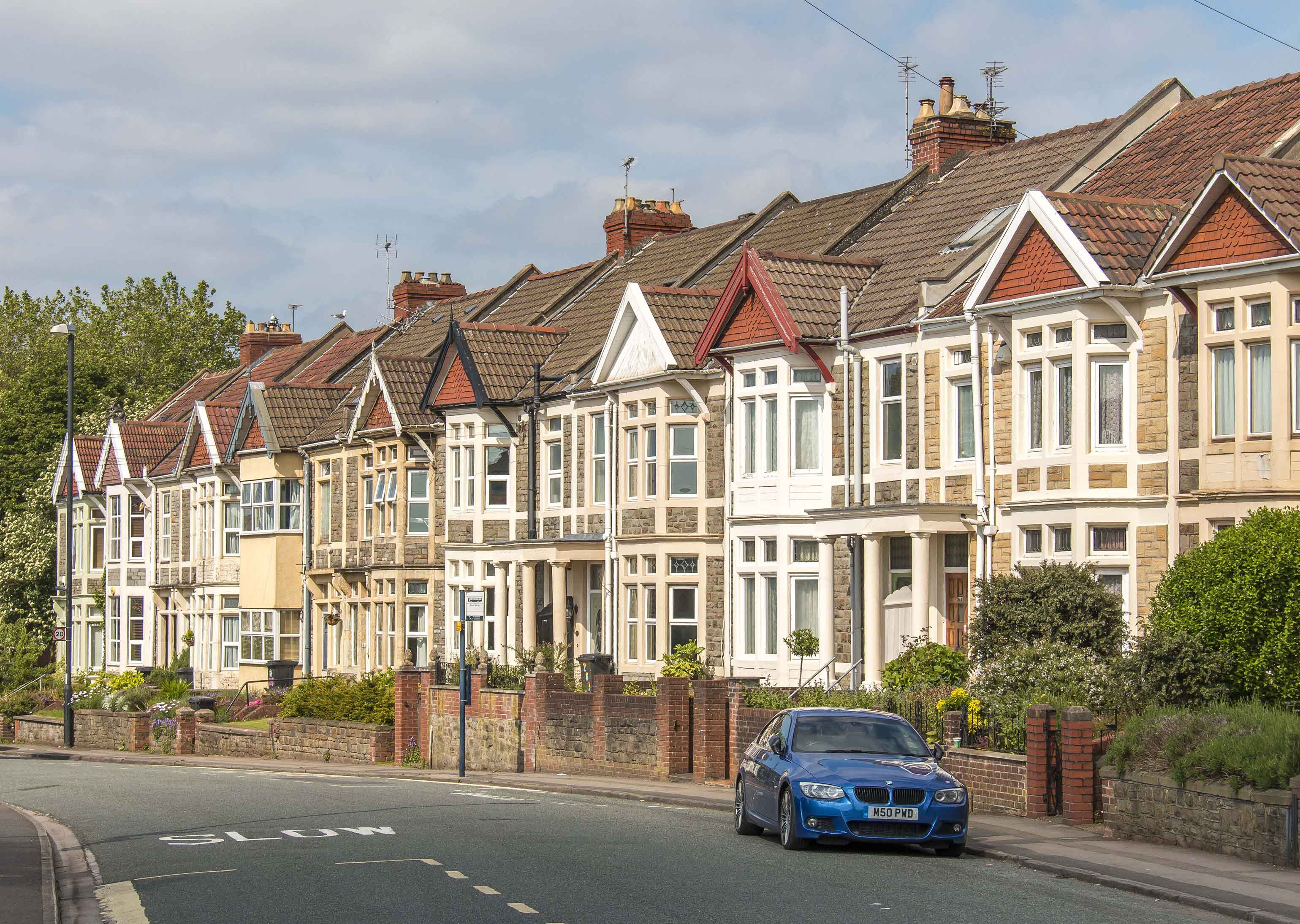
A row of houses in Brislington

== Education ==
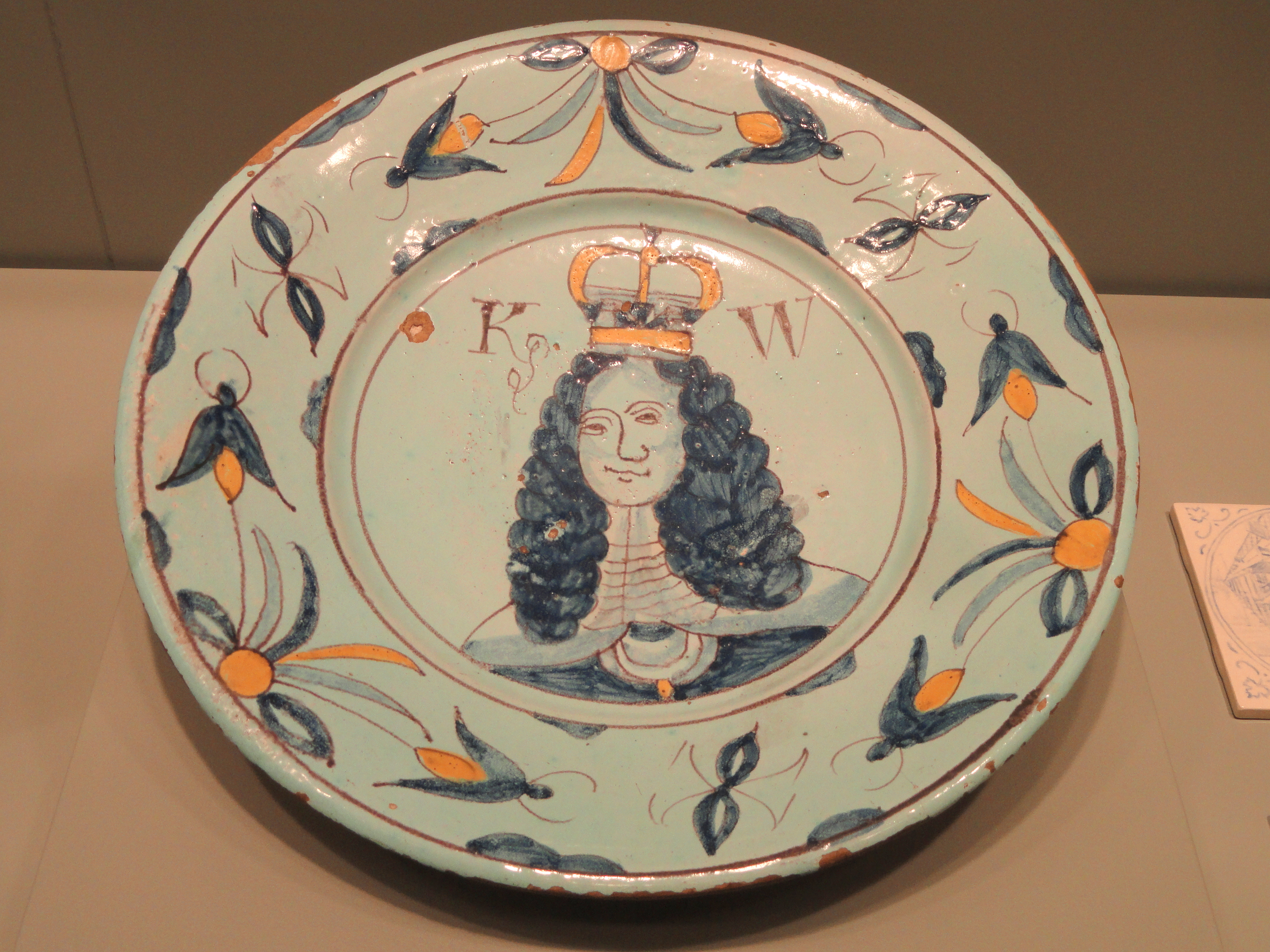
Dish commemorating William III, c. 1689–1702, Brislington, tin-glazed earthenware (English delftware). Brislington was a notable area of pottery production

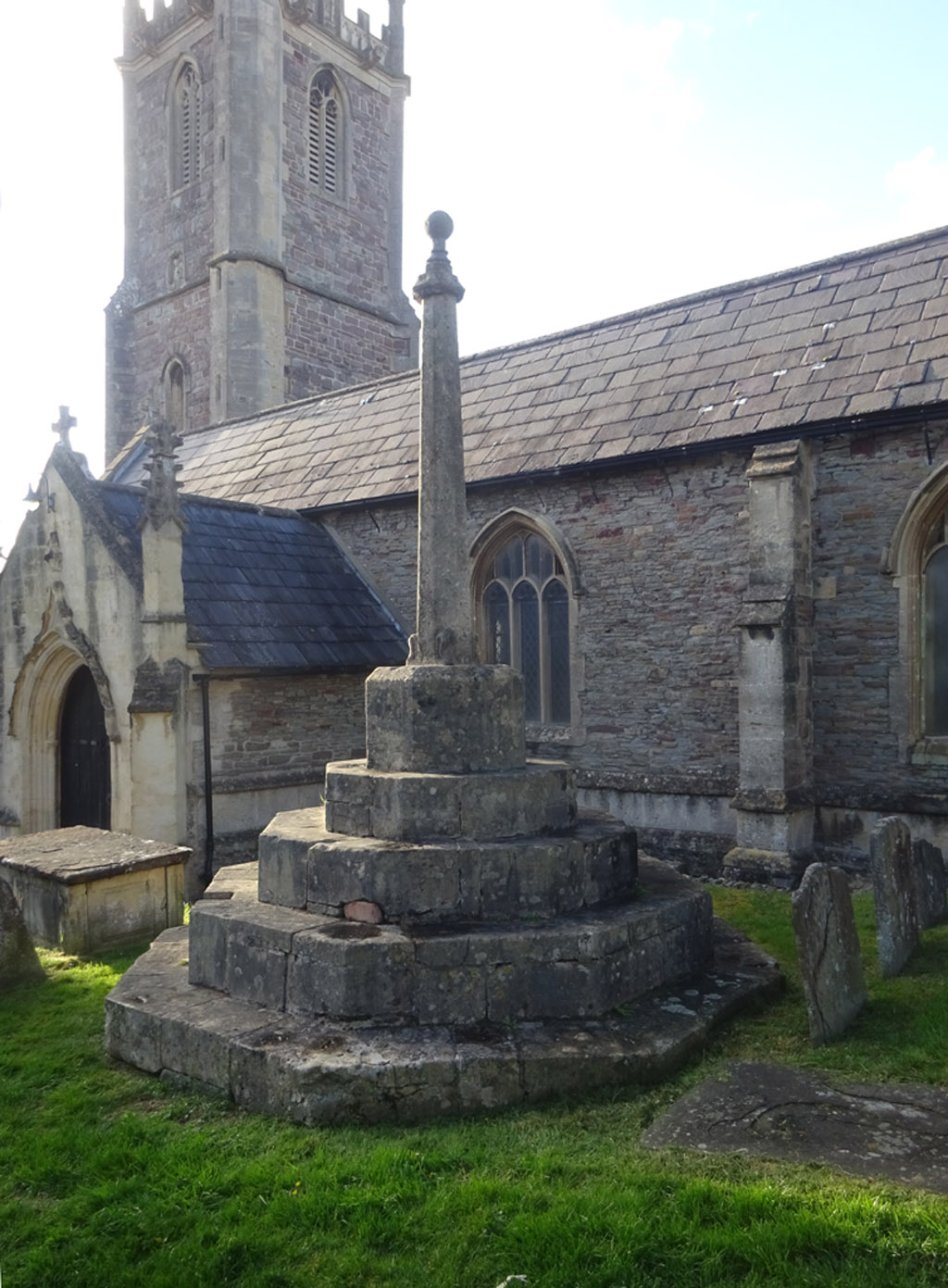
Village Cross, in St Luke the Evangelist churchyard

The area is home to CLC@Brislington, one of Bristol's three City Learning Centres, which use information communication technology in teaching and learning.

Schools in Brislington include St. Brendan's Sixth Form College, Holymead Primary School, Broomhill Junior and Infant School, Wicklea Academy, St Anne's Infants School, West Town Lane Primary School, and Oasis Academy Brislington, a local secondary school.

== Sport and leisure ==
Brislington has a Non-League football club Brislington F.C. who play at Ironmould Lane and a rugby union club, Old Redcliffians who play in National League 2 West, a level four league in the English rugby union system.
