= Edward Long Fox (psychiatrist) =

English psychiatrist

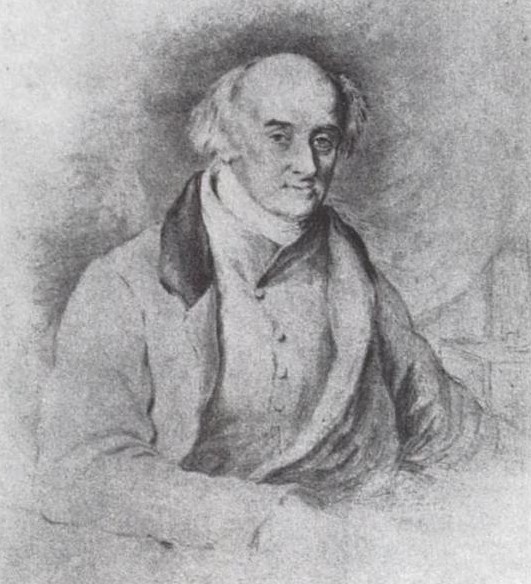
- Edward Long Fox
- Born: 26 April 1761; Falmouth, Cornwall, England
- Died: 2 May 1835 (aged 74); Brislington, Bristol (then Somerset)
- Education: University of Edinburgh
- Known for: Pioneer of mental health-care
- Scientific career
- Fields: Psychiatry

Edward Long Fox (26 April 1761 – 2 May 1835) was an English psychiatrist. He established an insane asylum at Brislington House, near Bristol, England, and classified the patients according to social class as well as behavioural presentation.

He was a member of the Fox family of Falmouth, one of the 11 children of Joseph Fox (1729–1784) and Elizabeth Hingston, his wife. He graduated and MD from the University of Edinburgh in 1784. Following the death of John Till Adams in 1786 he cared for many of Till Adams patients in the local Quaker community. Around the same time he joined Bristol Infirmary as a physician. He worked there for 30 years.

In 1830, he purchased Knightstone Island in Weston-super-Mare to create a therapeutic spa with a range of hot, cold and chemical baths.

He died at Brislington House in 1835, aged 74, and was buried in the nearby Friends' burial ground which had been purchased by the family along with an adjoining property called the Rookery.

== Family ==
Twice married, Fox had 15 daughters and 8 sons. He married Catherine Brown, daughter of Edward Brown, Esq., in 1784. After Catherine's death in 1803, Fox married Isabella Ker, eldest daughter of Major John Charles Ker.
