= European Film Award for European Discovery of the Year =

Annual European film award

European Discovery – Prix FIPRESCI
- Country: Europe
- Presented by: European Film Academy
- First award: 1988
- Currently held by: Laura Carreira for On Falling (2025)
- Website: europeanfilmawards.eu

The European Discovery – Prix FIPRESCI or European Discovery, originally titled Young European Film of the Year, has been awarded annually since 1988 by the European Film Academy. The award is presented in co-operation with the International Federation of Film Critics, to a director for the first full-length feature film.

== Winners and nominees ==
=== 1980s ===
Year	English title	Original title	Director(s)	Production country
1988	Young European Film of the Year			
1988	Women on the Verge of a Nervous Breakdown	Mujeres al borde de un ataque de nervios	Pedro Almodóvar	Spain
1988	Days of Eclipse	Дни затмения	Aleksandr Sokurov	Soviet Union
1988	It's Happening Tomorrow	Domani accadrà	Daniele Luchetti	Italy
1988	Damnation	Kárhozat	Béla Tarr	Hungary
1988	Pathfinder	Ofelaš	Nils Gaup	Norway
1988	Reefer and the Model		Joe Comerford	Ireland
1988	Stormy Monday		Mike Figgis	United Kingdom, United States
1989	300 Miles to Heaven	300 mil do nieba	Maciej Dejczer	Poland, Denmark, France
1989	Cinema Paradiso	Nuovo Cinema Paradiso	Giuseppe Tornatore	Italy, France
1989	Mist		Zülfü Livaneli	Turkey, Switzerland
1989	Kuduz		Ademir Kenović	Yugoslavia
1989	Scandal		Michael Caton-Jones	United Kingdom, United States
1989	My Left Foot		Jim Sheridan	Ireland, United Kingdom
1989	Waller's Last Trip	Wallers letzter Gang	Christian Wagner	West Germany

=== 1990s ===
Year	English title	Original title	Director(s)	Production country
1990	Young European Film of the Year			
1990	Henry V		Kenneth Branagh	United Kingdom
1990	The White Dove		Juan Minon	Spain
1990	On Tour	Turnè	Gabriele Salvatores	Italy
1990	Love Without Pity	Un monde sans pitié	Eric Rochant	France
1990	Freeze Die Come to Life	Замри, умри, воскресни!	Vitali Kanevsky	Soviet Union
1991	Toto the Hero	Toto le héros	Jaco van Dormael	Belgium, France, Germany
1991	Delicatessen		Marc Caro, Jean-Pierre Jeunet	France
1991	Ultra	Ultrà	Ricky Tognazzi	Italy
1992	The Northerners	De Noorderlingen	Alex van Warmerdam	Netherlands
1992	Three Days	Trys dienos	Šarūnas Bartas	Lithuania
1992	Nord		Xavier Beauvois	France
1993	Orlando		Sally Potter	United Kingdom, France, Netherlands, Russia, Italy
1993	Man Bites Dog	C'est arrivé près de chez vous	Rémy Belvaux, André Bonzel, and Benoît Poelvoorde	Belgium
1993	Antonio's Girlfriend	La petite amie d'Antonio	Manuel Poirier	France
1994	The Son of the Shark	Le Fils du Requin	Agnès Merlet	France, Belgium, Luxembourg
1994	Woyzeck		János Szász	Hungary
1994	Kosh ba kosh	Кош-ба-кош	Bakhtyar Khudojnazarov	Tajikistan, Russia, Germany, Switzerland, Japan
1995	La Haine		Mathieu Kassovitz	France
1995	Butterfly Kiss		Michael Winterbottom	United Kingdom
1995	The Deathmaker	Der Totmacher	Romuald Karmakar	Germany
1996	Some Mother's Son		Terry George	Ireland, United States
1996	Lea		Ivan Fíla	Czech Republic, Germany, France
1996	Beautiful Thing		Hettie MacDonald	United Kingdom
1997	European Discovery of the Year – Fassbinder Award			
1997	The Life of Jesus	La Vie de Jésus	Bruno Dumont	France
1998	European Discovery – Fassbinder Award			
1998	The Celebration	Festen	Thomas Vinterberg	Denmark, Sweden
1998	The Dreamlife of Angels	La Vie rêvée des anges	Erick Zonca	France
1999	The War Zone		Tim Roth	United Kingdom, Italy

=== 2000s ===
Year	English title	Original title	Director(s)	Production country
2000	European Discovery – Fassbinder Award			
2000	Human Resources	Ressources humaines	Laurent Cantet	France, United Kingdom
2000	101 Reykjavík		Baltasar Kormákur	Iceland, Denmark, France, Norway, Germany, Finland
2000	Gangster No. 1		Paul McGuigan	United Kingdom, Germany, Ireland
2000	Kennedy And I	Kennedy et moi	Sam Karmann	France
2000	Northern Skirts	Nordrand	Barbara Albert	Austria, Germany, Switzerland
2000	Some Voices		Simon Cellan-Jones	United Kingdom
2000	Together	Tillsammans	Lukas Moodysson	Sweden, Denmark, Italy
2000	Tuvalu		Veit Helmer	Germany
2000	Forget America	Vergiss Amerika	Vanessa Jopp	Germany
2001	El Bola		Achero Mañas	Spain
2001	alaska.de		Esther Gronenborn	Germany
2001	The Sea That Thinks	De zee die denkt	Gert de Graaff	Netherlands
2001	Dog Days	Hundstage	Ulrich Seidl	Austria
2001	Jalla! Jalla!		Josef Fares	Sweden
2001	Dead End Streets		Stavros Ioannou	Greece
2001	Last Resort		Paweł Pawlikowski	United Kingdom
2001	Lovely Rita		Jessica Hausner	Austria, Germany
2001	The Chimp	Маймыл	Aktan Abdykalykov	Kyrgystan, Russia, France, Japan
2001	Happy Man		Małgorzata Szumowska	Poland
2002	Hukkle		György Pálfi	Hungary
2002	Two Friends	Due amici	Spiro Scimone and Francesco Sframeli	Italy
2002	Minor Mishaps		Annette K. Olesen	Denmark, Sweden
2002	Respiro		Emanuele Crialese	Italy, Germany
2002	No Regrets		Benjamin Quabeck	Germany
2002	Smoking Room		Roger Gual and Julio D. Wallovits	Spain
2002	Pleasant Days	Szép napok	Kornél Mundruczó	Hungary
2002	The Warrior		Asif Kapadia	United Kingdom, Germany, France, India
2002	Guardian of the Frontier		Maja Weiss	Slovenia, Germany, France
2002	What's Going On?		Rabah Ameur-Zaïmeche	France
2002	The Kite		Aleksei Muradov	Russia
2003	The Return	Возвращение	Andrey Zvyagintsev	Russia
2003	Fuse	Gori vatra	Pjer Žalica	Bosnia and Herzegovina, Austria, Turkey, France
2003	The Hours of the Day	Las horas del día	Jaime Rosales	Spain
2003	Whatever You Say	Mon idole	Guillaume Canet	France
2003	Reconstruction		Christoffer Boe	Denmark
2003	Schultze Gets the Blues		Michael Schorr	Germany
2003	Young Adam		David Mackenzie	United Kingdom, France
2004	A Children's Story	Certi bambini	Andrea and Antonio Frazzi	Italy
2004	A Common Thread	Brodeuses	Éléonore Faucher	France
2004	Kroko		Sylke Enders	Germany
2004	Or (My Treasure)		Keren Yedaya	Israel, France
2004	A Wonderful Night in Split	Ta divna splitska noć	Arsen Anton Ostojić	Croatia
2004	Harvest Time	Время жатвы	Marina Razbezhkina	Russia
2005	Accused	Anklaget	Jakob Thuesen	Denmark
2005	Alice		Marco Martins	Portugal
2005	4		Ilya Khrzhanovsky	Russia
2005	Stranger		Małgorzata Szumowska	Poland, Germany, France
2005	When the Sea Rises	Quand la mer monte...	Yolande Moreau and Gilles Porte	Belgium, France
2005	Saimir		Francesco Munzi	Italy
2005	Uno		Aksel Hennie	Norway
2006	13 Tzameti		Géla Babluani	Germany, France
2006	Fresh Air		Ágnes Kocsis	Hungary
2006	Pingpong		Matthias Luthardt	Germany
2006	Retrieval	Z odzysku	Sławomir Fabicki	Poland
2007	The Band's Visit	ביקור התזמורת	Eran Kolirin	Israel, France, United States
2007	Control		Anton Corbijn	United Kingdom, United States, Australia, Japan
2007	Takva: A Man's Fear of God	Takva	Özer Kiziltan	Turkey, Germany
2007	Counterparts	Gegenüber	Jan Bonny	Germany
2008	Hunger		Steve McQueen	United Kingdom, Ireland
2008	Snow	Snijeg	Aida Begić	Bosnia and Herzegovina, Germany, France, Iran
2008	Summer Book		Seyfi Teoman	Turkey
2008	Tulpan	Тюльпан	Sergey Dvortsevoy	Kazakhstan, Germany, Italy, Poland, Russia, Switzerland
2009	Katalin Varga		Peter Strickland	United Kingdom, Romania, Hungary
2009	The Other Bank	გაღმა ნაპირი	George Ovashvili	Georgia, Kazakhstan
2009	Ajami	عجمي	Scandar Copti and Yaron Shani	Germany, Israel
2009	Be Good		Juliette Garcias	France, Denmark
2009	Autumn	Sonbahar	Özcan Alper	Turkey, Germany

=== 2010s ===
Year	English title	Original title	Director(s)	Production country
European Discovery – Prix FIPRESCI
2010	Lebanon	לְבָנוֹן	Samuel Maoz	Israel, France, Germany
2010	Nothing Personal		Urszula Antoniak	Netherlands, Ireland
2010	When We Leave	Die Fremde	Feo Aladag	Germany
2010	If I Want to Whistle, I Whistle	Eu când vreau să fluier, fluier	Florin Serban	Romania
2010	The Double Hour	La doppia ora	Giuseppe Capotondi	Italy
2011	Oxygen	Adem	Hans Van Nuffel	Belgium, Netherlands
2011	Breathing	Atmen	Karl Markovics	Austria
2011	Michael		Markus Schleinzer	Austria
2011	Nothing's All Bad	Smukke mennesker	Mikkel Munch-Fals	Denmark
2011	Tilva Roš		Nikola Ležaić	Serbia
2012	Kauwboy		Boudewijn Koole	Netherlands
2012	Broken		Rufus Norris	United Kingdom
2012	Reported Missing	Die Vermissten	Jan Speckenbach	Germany
2012	Teddy Bear		Mads Matthiesen	Denmark
2012	Twilight Portrait		Angelina Nikonova	Russia
2013	A Coffee in Berlin		Jan Ole Gerster	Germany
2013	Eat Sleep Die	Äta sova dö	Gabriela Pichler	Sweden
2013	Call Girl		Mikael Marcimain	Sweden, Norway, Ireland, Finland
2013	Miele		Valeria Golino	Italy, France
2013	The Plague		Neus Ballús	Spain
2014	The Tribe	Плем'я	Myroslav Slaboshpytskiy	Ukraine
2014	10,000 km		Carlos Marqués-Marcet	Spain
2014	Wounded	La herida	Fernando Franco	Spain
2014	'71		Yann Demange	United Kingdom
2014	Party Girl		Marie Amachoukeli, Claire Burger, and Samuel Theis	France
2015	Mustang		Deniz Gamze Ergüven	France, Germany, Turkey
2015	Goodnight Mommy	Ich seh, Ich seh	Veronika Franz and Severin Fiala	Austria
2015	Limbo		Anna Sofie Hartmann	Germany, Denmark
2015	Slow West		John Maclean	New Zealand, United Kingdom
2015	Summers Downstairs	Im Sommer wohnt er unten	Tom Sommerlatte	Germany, France
2016	The Happiest Day in the Life of Olli Mäki	Hymyilevä mies	Juho Kuosmanen	Finland, Sweden, Germany
2016	Dogs	Câini	Bogdan Mirica	France, Romania, Bulgaria, Qatar
2016	Liebmann		Jules Herrmann	Germany
2016	Sand Storm	סופת חול	Elite Zexer	Israel
2016	Thirst		Svetla Tsotsorkova	Bulgaria
2017	Lady Macbeth		William Oldroyd	United Kingdom
2017	Bloody Milk	Petit paysan	Hubert Charuel	France
2017	Godless	Безбог	Ralitza Petrova	Bulgaria, Denmark, France
2017	Summer 1993	Estiu 1993	Carla Simón	Spain
2017	The Eremites		Ronny Trocker	Germany, Austria
2018	Girl		Lukas Dhont	Belgium, Netherlands
2018	One Day		Zsófia Szilágyi	Hungary
2018	Scary Mother	საშიში დედა	Ana Urushadze	Georgia, Estonia
2018	The Guilty	Den skyldige	Gustav Möller	Denmark
2018	Those Who Are Fine	Dene wos guet geit	Cyril Schäublin	Switzerland
2018	Touch Me Not	Nu mă atinge	Adina Pintilie	Romania, Germany, Czech Republic, Bulgaria, France
2019	Les Misérables		Ladj Ly	France
2019	Aniara		Pella Kagerman and Hugo Lilja	Sweden, Denmark
2019	Atlantics	Atlantique	Mati Diop	France, Senegal, Belgium
2019	Blind Spot	Blindsone	Tuva Novotny	Norway, Denmark
2019	Irina	Ирина	Nadejda Koseva	Bulgaria
2019	Ray & Liz		Richard Billingham	United Kingdom

=== 2020s ===
Year	English title	Original title	Director(s)	Production country
European Discovery – Prix FIPRESCI
2020	Sole		Carlo Sironi	Italy, Poland
2020	Full Moon		Nermin Hamzagic	Bosnia and Herzegovina
2020	Gagarine		Fanny Liatard and Jérémy Trouilh	France
2020	Instinct		Halina Reijn	Netherlands
2020	Isaac		Jurgis Matulevicius	Lithuania
2020	Jumbo		Zoé Wittock	France, Belgium, Luxembourg
2021	Promising Young Woman		Emerald Fennell	United States, United Kingdom
2021	Beginning	დასაწყისი	Dea Kulumbegashvili	France, Georgia
2021	Lamb	Dýrið	Valdimar Jóhannsson	Iceland, Sweden, Poland
2021	Playground	Un monde	Laura Wandel	Belgium
2021	Pleasure		Ninja Thyberg	Sweden, Netherlands, France
2021	The Whaler Boy	Китобой	Philipp Yuryev	Russia, Poland, Belgium
2022	Small Body	Piccolo corpo	Laura Samani	Italy, Slovenia, France
2022	Love According to Dalva	Dalva	Emmanuelle Nicot	Belgium, France
2022	107 Mothers	Цензорка	Peter Kerekes	Slovakia, Czech Republic, Ukraine
2022	Other People		Aleksandra Terpińska	Poland, France
2022	Pamfir	Памфір	Dmytro Sukholytkyy-Sobchuk	Ukraine, France, Poland, Germany, Chile
2022	Sonne		Kurdwin Ayub	Austria
2023	How to Have Sex		Molly Manning Walker	United Kingdom, Greece
2023	20,000 Species of Bees	20.000 especies de abejas	Estibaliz Urresola Solaguren	Spain
2023	La Palisiada	Ля Палісіада	Philip Sotnychenko	Ukraine
2023	Safe Place	Sigurno mjesto	Juraj Lerotić	Croatia, Slovenia
2023	The Quiet Migration		Malene Choi	Denmark
2023	Vincent Must Die	Vincent doit mourir	Stéphan Castang	France, Belgium
2024	Armand		Halfdan Ullmann Tøndel	Norway, Netherlands, Germany, Sweden
2024	Hoard		Luna Carmoon	United Kingdom
2024	Kneecap		Rich Peppiatt	Ireland, United Kingdom
2024	Santosh		Sandhya Suri	United Kingdom, France, Germany
2024	The New Year That Never Came	Anul Nou care n-a fost	Bogdan Mureșanu	Romania
2024	Toxic	Akiplėša	Saulė Bliuvaitė	Lithuania
2025	On Falling		Laura Carreira	Portugal, United Kingdom
2025	Little Trouble Girls	Kaj ti je deklica	Urška Djukić	Croatia, Italy, Serbia, Slovenia
2025	My Father's Shadow		Akinola Davies Jr.	Nigeria, United Kingdom
2025	One of Those Days When Hemme Dies	Hemme’nin öldüğü günlerden biri	Murat Fıratoğlu	Germany, Turkey
2025	Sauna		Mathias Broe	Denmark
2025	Under the Grey Sky		Mara Tamkovich	Poland

^{^[a]}Award given as Best Young Film or Young European Film of the Year

== Most wins for European Discovery by country ==
Country	Awards	Nominations	Awards (with co-productions)	Nominations (with co-productions)
France	6	17	11	35
United Kingdom	5	17	6	20
Spain	2	8	2	8
Denmark	2	6	3	10
Netherlands	2	4	4	6
Belgium	2	4	3	5
Israel	2	4	2	5
Germany	1	17	4	37
Italy	1	10	3	14
Hungary	1	5	2	6
(Republic of Ireland) Ireland	1	3	2	7
Poland	1	3	1	4
Russia	1	3	2	7
(Georgia (country)) Georgia	1	2	1	2
Finland	1	1	1	2
Portugal	1	1	1	1
Ukraine	1	1	1	1
Austria	0	4	1	8
Sweden	0	4	1	8
Turkey	0	4	1	6
Soviet Union	0	3	0	3
Bosnia and Herzegovina	0	2	0	2
Romania	0	3	1	4
Norway	0	1	0	2
Kazakhstan	0	1	0	2
Bulgaria	0	1	0	2
Croatia	0	1	0	1
Czech Republic	0	1	0	1
Greece	0	1	0	1
Iceland	0	1	0	1
Kyrgyzstan	0	1	0	1
New Zealand	0	1	0	1
Serbia	0	1	0	1
Slovakia	0	1	0	1
Slovenia	0	1	0	1
Tajikistan	0	1	0	1
(Socialist Federal Republic of Yugoslavia) Yugoslavia	0	1	0	1
United States	0	0	3	6
Luxembourg	0	0	1	1
Lebanon	0	0	1	1
Switzerland	0	0	0	4
Japan	0	0	0	3
Australia	0	0	0	1
India	0	0	0	1
Iran	0	0	0	1
Qatar	0	0	0	1
