= Karin Ugowski =

German actress

- Born: Karin Komischke; 11 July 1943 (age 82); Berlin, Germany
- Occupations: Actress; narrator; producer
- Years active: 1962–present
- Known for: Das unsichtbare Visier, Polizeiruf 110, König Drosselbart
- Movement: Neues Forum
- Website: karin-ugowski.com

Karin Ugowski (née Komischke; born 11 July 1943) is a German actress, narrator, film producer and furtherer of art and culture in Germany with various stations of work in UK, France, Italy, Israel, Russia, Hungary, Poland, Spain, US and Germany.

== Early life ==
Karin Ugowski was born in Berlin Johannisthal, Germany during the last stage of The Battle of Berlin in the middle of the Berlin bombings, 2 years before the end of Second World War. She grew up in postwar Germany behind the Iron Curtain and her parents were both wartime traumatized. After finishing Gymnasiale Oberstufe (comparable to Highschool in US) she was intended to study medicine. Against the will of her parents she attended to the Film University Babelsberg in 1962 and received her B.A. in drama from the Film University Babelsberg, Germany in 1965. She has a younger brother.

== Career ==
During her acting studies she already gained notice and received widespread recognition for her enchanting but self-confident impersonations of the princess roles in German classic theatrical motion pictures in the early 1960s based on historical fairy tales, like Mother Holly (1963), The Golden Goose (1964) and King Thrushbeard (1965) co-starring German cult actor Manfred Krug. Her first cinema appearances were heavily related to an ideal of female youth and beauty in the 1960s of postwar Germany. In this time she already became an up-and-coming film star building a fan base, which still remains until today for these old film classics, which are still airing in German TV frequently.

In early science fiction motion pictures like Signale – Ein Weltraumabenteuer (1970) (English: "Signals") and in historical feature films like the spy thriller The Invisible Visor (1973) which has already achieved cult status, co-starring the young Armin Mueller-Stahl, or as the malicious white farmers daughter in the German film version of the American Indian legend story Osceola (1971) or even in first episodes of the German TV classic crime series Police call 110, where she appears as one of the first officiating female police detectives and inspectors besides the actress Sigrid Göhler in German TV, she has so much the more astounded and irritated her fan base knowing her from the princess roles by showing completely different faces in the 1970s and exposing as character actress of complex parts. More than once she has surprised with her versatility, as shown again in the more recent years, like in the cinema short film Open (2005) of the director Charlotte Siebenrock, when she turned from an old frustrated canteen kitchen porter into an attractive buoyant and beautiful looking women within minutes, leading to the presentation of the short film at various short film festivals or in the motion picture In All Colours of the Rainbow (2007) in a role of an older woman falling in love with a much younger man fighting the social resentment, directed by her son, Sebastian Ugovsky.

Already during her first film work she fell in love with theater, especially the experimental and political theatre, which was able to change something in the time of upheaval in Germany. As a permanent company member of the Volksbuehne Berlin theatre, she worked early with great personalities such as Benno Besson, Heiner Müller and later Frank Castorf, Johann Kresnik, Leander Haußmann, Christoph Schlingensief and other Berlin theater-greats with guest performances all over the world. This is how she became a member of the political movement Neues Forum in the late 1980s, supporting the political rally in November 1989 at the Berlin Alexanderplatz, which was part of the Fall of the Berlin Wall and the lifting of the Iron Curtain leading to the end of the Cold War.

The actress, who has frequently campaigned for art and culture support and development in Germany in the last decades and has carried a yearly exhibition festival with her husband to support artists in this area, became a talking point recently again by participating in a supporting role as mother of the lead in Samuel Maoz's latest international motion picture Foxtrot (Israel, 2017), a sequel of his award-winning motion picture Lebanon (2009), which will likely screen in Cannes and won the Silver lion (Grand Prix de Jury) at the Biennale 2017/18.

In all, the actress was involved in over 80 theater productions and over 150 film and television productions. Politically, Karin Ugowski can be considered as critical of any system, reasoned by her own history and which is mirrored in her commitment for political theater and various interpretive readings up to today. Since 2006, Karin Ugowski is an active member of the German Film Academy and member of the jury for the German film award (LOLA).

== Personal life ==
During her acting studies in the time when she came to be known for her first motion picture appearances in the 1960s, she met her first husband Eberhart Ugowski and married very quickly. In this time her first son was born. Even if the marriage only lasted for a few years, her last name by which she is known (Ugowski) remains from this marriage. Since then she kept the name even after the divorce in 1967 because of the name recognition.

In the 1970s, she was in a long-term relationship with the actor and well-known theater director Helmut Straßburger she met when working with him on theater stagings, bringing her second son into the world: the author, play wright, independent Stage Director and film maker, composer and Music Producer Sebastian Ugovsky (sometimes credited as Gilmano for musical works), the founder of the music record label REQQORD (formerly Slo' Jam) in Berlin, Germany, who has contributed music titles to film scores of motion pictures like The Equalizer (2014, Denzel Washington).

Ugowski has cultivated a long-term friendship with the author and play wright Peter Brasch, brother of also well-known author, poet and play write Thomas Brasch and the actor Klaus Brasch. The parents of the Brasch brothers were Jewish immigrants to the UK in the late 1930s during the pogrom in Germany and moved back to Germany after the end of Second World War, which made both authors, Thomas and Peter, being strongly driven by the dream for eternal peace and freedom of thought in their work, a common ground between the Braschs and Karin Ugowski. Peter Brasch had a crash on Karin Ugowski and has dedicated a book of poetry to her (inscription) and wrote another radio play called The Golden Goose – an audio drama adaptation in 1989 inspired by her role of princess Roswitha in the classic movie. He died in 2001. He was one of the first having insights in the first writings of Karin Ugowski's son Sebastian Ugovsky.

Since 1993, she has been married to painter and scenographer Günter Horn, the last living advisee of the famous painter Otto Nagel.

== Filmography ==
A selection of Cinema and TV motion pictures.

Original title	Year	English title	Director
Foxtrot	2017	Foxtrot	Samuel Maoz
Auf dem Weg ins Leben	2014	On the way	Sebastian Ugovsky
Die Farben des Regenbogen	2007	In all Colours of the Rainbow	Sebastian Ugovsky
Tornado – Der Zorn des Himmels	2006	F4: Vortex	Andreas Linke
Open	2005	Open	Charlotte Siebenrock
Der Mörder meines Vaters	2005	The Killer of my Father	Urs Egger
Soko Leipzig	2005	Leipzig Homicide	Michel Bielawa
Sehnsucht	2004	Desire	Ciro Cappellari
Polizeiruf 110	2001	Police call 110	Marco Serafini
Polizeiruf 110	1999	Police call 110	Marijan David Vajda
Die Männer vom K3	1993	K3	Sigi Rothemund
Ein kleiner Knall am Nachmittag	1991	A Little Bang on PM	Christine Krüger
Der Staatsanwalt hat das Wort	1990	The Prosecutor holds the Floor	Manfred Mosblech
Der Staatsanwalt hat das Wort	1990	The Prosecutor holds the Floor	Gunter Friedrich
Ein brauchbarer Mann	1989	A Useful Man	Hans-Werner Honert
Polizeiruf 110	1989	Police call 110	Thomas Jacob
Die Beteiligten	1989	Those Involved	Horst E. Brandt
Der Staatsanwalt hat das Wort	1987	The Prosecutor holds the Floor	Thomas Jacob
Der Staatsanwalt hat das Wort	1986	The Prosecutor holds the Floor	Georgi Kissimov
Der Doppelgänger	1985	Doubles	Werner W. Wallroth
Polizeiruf 110	1984	Police call 110	Klaus Grabowsky
Ach du meine Liebe	1984	Oh Dear!	Georgi Kissimov
Das Puppenheim in Pinnow	1984	The Doll's House in Pinnow	Christian Steinke
Meine hoffnungsvollen Kinder	1983	Offsprings of Hope	Georgi Kissimov
Der Staatsanwalt hat das Wort	1983	The Prosecutor holds the Floor	Hans Knötzsch
Der Staatsanwalt hat das Wort	1983	The Prosecutor holds the Floor	Hans Werner
Im Spiegel	1983	In the Mirror	Helmut Krätzig
Der Staatsanwalt hat das Wort	1981	The Prosecutor holds the Floor	Achim Hübner
Ernste Spiele	1980	Serious Games	Tamás Fejér
Das Ding im Schloß	1979	The Thing in the Castle	Gottfried Kolditz
Der Staatsanwalt hat das Wort	1978	The Prosecutor holds the Floor	Hans-Werner Honert
Ehe man Ehefrau bleibt	1977	Ere Remain Being his Wife	Jens-Peter Proll
Das unsichtbare Visier – Afrikaanse Broederbond 3	1977	The Invisible Visor	Peter Hagen
Das unsichtbare Visier – Afrikaanse Broederbond 2	1977	The Invisible Visor	Peter Hagen
Das unsichtbare Visier – Afrikaanse Broederbond 1	1977	The Invisible Visor	Peter Hagen
Der Staatsanwalt hat das Wort	1976	The Prosecutor holds the Floor	Horst Zaeske
Polizeiruf 110	1973	Police call 110	Jerzy Bednarczyk, Jan Laskowski
Die Nacht der Barrikaden	1973	The Nights of the Barricades	Hubert Kreuz
Polizeiruf 110	1972	Police call 110	Bernhard Stephan
Osceola	1971	Osceola	Konrad Petzold, James Winburn
Der Staatsanwalt hat das Wort	1971	The Prosecutor holds the Floor	Horst Zaeske
Caesar & Cleopatra	1970	Caesar & Cleopatra	Ottofritz Gaillard
Signale – Ein Weltraumabenteuer	1970	Signals	Gottfried Kolditz
Der Staatsanwalt hat das Wort	1969	The Prosecutor holds the Floor	Ursula Reinhold
Tolle Tage	1969	Happy Days	Wolfgang Luderer
Geheime Spuren (1–3)	1969	Undercover Trails	Helmut Krätzig
Geheimkommando Spree (1 & 2)	1968	Secret Operation Unit „Spree"	Helmut Krätzig
Der erste Sommer	1968	The first Summer	Ursula Schmenger
Die Erben des Manifests: Unterm Wind der Jahre (1–3)	1967	Heirs of the Manifesto: Wind of Change	Peter Hagen
Zielansprache	1967	The Target Speech	Ursula Reinhold
Hat Adam Riese sich verrechnet?	1966	Has Adam Riese been wrong?	Hans Joachim Preil
Columbus 64	1966	Columbus 64	Ulrich Thein
Trick 17b	1966	Trick 17b – The Ploy	Hans-Erich Korbschmitt
Der Nachfolger	1965	The Successor	Ingrid Sander
König Drosselbart	1965	King Thrushbeard	Walter Beck
Julika	1965	Julika	Martin Eckermann
Ehering in der Westentasche	1965	The Wedding Ring in the Vest Pocket	Hubert Hoelzke
Die goldene Gans	1964	The Golden Goose	Siegfried Hartmann
Frau Holle	1963	Mother Holly	Gottfried Kolditz

== Theatrography ==
A selection.

German title	English title	Written by	Year	Pos	Role	Director
Königsberg		Andrei Nekrasov	2002	SR	Mother of Vlad	Andrei Nekrasov
Baal	Baal	Berthold Brecht	2001	SR	4th Lady, and Luise, and Neger John	Thomas Bischoff
Paul + Paula. Die Legende vom Glück ohne Ende	The Legend of Paul and Paula	Ulrich Plenzdorf	2000	LR	Pauls wife, Ines	Leander Haußmann
Engel der Tankstelle		Edward Thomas	2000	LR	Mati (Mother)	Lydia Bunk
Traumspiel	A Dream Play	August Strindberg	2000	ELR		Sebastian Hartmann
Heinrich IV., 1 – Die Lohnarbeiter	Henry IV, Part 1	William Shakespeare	1999	SR	Queen	Gabriele Gysi
Richard III. – Der Fortschritt	Richard III	William Shakespeare	1999	SR	Queen Elisabeth	Johann Kresnik
Die Toten Seelen	Dead Souls	Nikolaj W. Gogol	1998	LR	Lady of the manor	Andrej Woron
Zement		Heiner Müller (based on Gladkow)	1996	SR		Andreas Kriegenburg
Golden Fliesst der Stahl – Wolokolamsker Chaussee		Karl Grünberg, Heiner Müller	1996	SR	Mother Schreivögel	Frank Castorf
Hinkemann		Ernst Toller	1995	SR		Andreas Kriegenburg
Dr. Jekyll & Mr. Hyde	Strange Case of Dr Jekyll and Mr Hyde	based on Robert Louis Stevenson	1995	SR		Michael Simon
Angeklagt. Prozess gegen eine Videokamera		Michael Zeyfang	1994	LR		Michael Zeyfang
100 Jahre CDU – Spiel ohne Grenzen		Christoph Schlingensief	1993	LR	One of the Swinten Sisters	Christoph Schlingensief
Die Rausfallenden alten Weiber	The falling old girls	Daniil Charms	1993	ER	One of the old girls	Herbert Fritsch
Stadt der Gerechtigkeit	City of justice	Lew Lunz	1992	SR		Andreas Kriegenburg
Die Komödie der Irrungen	The Comedy of Errors	William Shakespeare	1991	LR	Adriana	Werner Tietze
Wann Haben Sie Zuletzt ... Ihre Hosen Gesehn?		Ray Galton, John Antrobus	1991	SR		B. K. Tragelehn
Woyzek	Woyzeck	Georg Büchner	1991	SR	Neighbour	Andreas Kriegenburg
Clavigo	Clavigo	based on Johann Wolfgang Goethe	1990	LR	Clavigo	Henry Hübchen
Räuber von Schiller	The Robbers	Friedrich Schiller (edited by Frank Castorf)	1990	SR	One of the Trudes	Frank Castorf
Hundeherz	Heart of a Dog	Alexander Tscherwinski (based on Michail Bulgakow)	1989	SR		Horst Hawemann
Der Letzte der Feurigen Liebhaber	Last of the Red Hot Lovers	Neil Simon	1988	LR	Elaine	Klaus Mertens
Kaspar der Mensch		Adolf Glasbrenner	1987	LR		Harald Warmbrunn
Garage		Emil Braginskij, Edgar Rjasanow	1985	LR	Mrs. Kuschakowa	Harald Warmbrunn
Die kleine Hexe, die nicht böse sein konnte		Maria Clara Machado	1985	SR	One of the 3 antagonists	Werner Tietze
Mein Dicker Mantel & Prinzessin Zartfuss und die 7 Elefanten		Albert Wendt	1984	LR	Princess Zartfuß	Werner Tietze
Das Sogenannte Privatleben (Aus den Notizen Lopatins)		Konstantin Simonov	1982	LR		Werner Tietze
Der Geizige	The Miser	Jean Baptiste Molière	1981	LR	Elise	Werner Tietze
Die Verbrecher		Ferdinand Bruckner	1981	LR	Ernestine Puschek	Werner Tietze
Vor aller Augen		Rudi Strahl	1980	LR	Weibl Hauptrolle	Helmut Straßburger
Heimat		Hermann Sudermann	1980	LR	Magda	Werner Tietze
Ende Gut, Alles Gut	All's Well That Ends Well	William Shakespeare	1979	SR	Diana	Helmut Straßburger
Das Gewissen		based on the novel of Jòzef Lenart	1979	LR	Wife of male Leading role	Werner Tietze
Aufzeichnungen Eines Toten (Theaterroman)	Theatrical Novel	Michail Bulgakow (edited by Armin Stolper)	1977	SR	diverse	Helmut Straßburger
Handbetrieb		Paul Gratzik	1976	SR	One of the girlfriends	Helmut Straßburger
Die Deutschen Kleinstädter		August von Kotzebue	1976	ER		Helmut Straßburger
Das schöne grüne Vögelchen		Carlo Gozzi (edited by Birgit Meißel, Ezio Toffolutti & company)	1975	SR	Queen in the dungeon	Helmut Straßburger
Familie TÓT		István Örkeny	1974	SR	Kati (the daughter)	Lutz Günzel, Helmut Straßburger, Thomas Vallentin und Klaus Waack
Rameaus Neffe	Rameau's Nephew	Denis Diderot	1973	SR	One of the Chansonettes	Helmut Straßburger
Pfeile des Eros. Ein Sittenbild der Antike		Günther Cwojdrak	1971	LR	One of the 3 women	Fritz Decho
Der Arzt Wider Willen	The doctor in spite of himself	Jean Baptiste Molière (edited by Benno Besson, Heiner Müller)	1970	LR	Youthful lover	Benno Besson
O, Hamlet, welch ein Aufstieg!		Notes of Hermann Kant	1968	LR	The female Leading role	Fritz Decho
V wie Vietnam	V like Vietnam	Armand Gatti	1968	SR	TV correspondent	Hans-Joachim Martens, Wolfgang Pintzka
Kabale und Liebe	Intrigue and Love	Friedrich Schiller	1967	SR	Servant	Hans-Joachim Martens
Siebentens: Stiehl Ein Bischen Weniger		Dario Fo	1967	SR	Dancing Prostitute	Wolfgang Pintzka
Jeanne Oder Die Lerche	The Lark	Jean Anouilh	1966	SR	The little Queen	Hans-Joachim Martens
Der züchtige Klapperstorch. Ein Abend mit Chansons und Gedichten.		Kurt Tucholsky, Erich Kästner	1964	LR		
