= List of Serbian European Film Award winners and nominees =

This is a list of Serbian European Film Award winners and nominees. This list details the performances of Serbian actors, actresses, and films that have either been submitted or nominated for, or have won, a European Film Award including Serbian co-productions.

== Main categories ==
Year	Award	Recipient	Status	Note
2003	Best Short Film	(A) Torzija	Won	Slovenian-Serbian co-production
2003	Best Screenwriter	Dušan Kovačević for The Professional	Nominated	
2006	Best Actress	Mirjana Karanović for Grbavica: Esma's Secret	Nominated	Bosnian-Austrian-German-Croatian co-production
2007	Best Actor	Miki Manojlović for Irina Palm	Nominated	
2011	European Discovery	Tilva Roš	Nominated	
2013	Best Comedy	The Priest's Children	Nominated	Croatian-Montenegrin-Serbian co-production
2015	Best Short Film	Naše telo	Nominated	Serbian-Bosnian co-production
2016	People's Choice Award for Best Film	The High Sun	Nominated	Croatian-Slovenian-Serbian co-production
2021	Best Actress	Jasna Đuričić	Won	Bosnian-Austrian-German-French-Dutch-Norwegian-Polish-Romanian-Turkish co-production

== See also ==
- List of Serbian submissions for the Academy Award for Best Foreign Language Film
