= 23rd European Film Awards =

2010 film awards ceremony in Estonia

The 23rd European Film Awards
- Date: 4 December 2010
- Location: Nokia Concert Hall; Tallinn, Estonia
- Presented by: European Film Academy
- Hosted by: Anke Engelke; Märt Avandi

The 23rd European Film Awards were presented on 4 December, 2010, in Tallinn, Estonia.

== Winners and nominees ==
The nominations for the 23rd European Film Awards were announced on 6 November at the Seville European Film Festival.

=== Best Film ===
English title	Original title	Director(s)	Country
The Ghost Writer		Roman Polanski	France, Germany, United Kingdom
Honey	Bal	Semih Kaplanoğlu	Turkey
Of Gods and Men	Des hommes et des dieux	Xavier Beauvois	France
Lebanon	לבנון	Samuel Maoz	Israel, Germany, France
The Secret in Their Eyes	El secreto de sus ojos	Juan José Campanella	Argentina, Spain
Soul Kitchen		Fatih Akın	Germany

=== Best Director ===
Roman Polanski – The Ghost Writer

- Olivier Assayas – Carlos
- Semih Kaplanoğlu – Honey (Bal)
- Samuel Maoz – Lebanon
- Paolo Virzì – The First Beautiful Thing (La prima cosa bella)

=== Best Actress ===
Sylvie Testud – Lourdes

- Zrinka Cvitešić – On the Path (Na putu)
- Sibel Kekilli – When We Leave (Die Fremde)
- Lesley Manville – Another Year
- Lotte Verbeek – Nothing Personal

=== Best Actor ===
Ewan McGregor – The Ghost Writer

- Jakob Cedergren – Submarino
- Elio Germano – Our Life (La nostra vita)
- George Piştereanu – If I Want to Whistle, I Whistle (Eu când vreau să fluier, fluier)
- Luis Tosar – Cell 211 (Celda 211)

=== Best Animated Feature Film ===
The Illusionist – Sylvain Chomet • United Kingdom/France

- Planet 51 – Jorge Blanco • Spain/United Kingdom
- Sammy's Adventures: The Secret Passage – Ben Stassen • Belgium

=== Best Screenwriter ===
Robert Harris and Roman Polanski – The Ghost Writer

- Jorge Guerricaechevarría and Daniel Monzón – Cell 211 (Celda 211)
- Samuel Maoz – Lebanon
- Radu Mihaileanu – The Concert (Le concert)

=== Best Cinematographer ===
Giora Bejach – Lebanon

- Caroline Champetier – Of Gods and Men (Des hommes et des dieux)
- Pavel Kostomarov – How I Ended This Summer (Как я провёл этим летом)
- Barış Özbiçer – Honey (Bal)

=== Best Editor ===
Luc Barnier and Marion Monnier – Carlos

- Arik Lahav-Leibovich – Lebanon
- Hervé de Luze – The Ghost Writer

=== Best Production Designer ===
Albrecht Konrad – The Ghost Writer

- Paola Bizzarri and Luis Ramirez – I, Don Giovanni (Io, Don Giovanni)
- Markku Pätilä and Jaagup Roomet – The Temptation of St. Tony (Püha Tõnu kiusamine)

=== Best Composer ===
Alexandre Desplat – The Ghost Writer

- Ales Brezina – Kawasaki's Rose (Kawasakiho růže)
- Pasquale Catalano – Loose Cannons (Mine vaganti)
- Gary Yershon – Another Year

=== Best Documentary ===
Nostalgia for the Light (Nostalgia de la luz) – Patricio Guzmán • France/Germany/Chile

- Armadillo – Janus Metz • Denmark/Sweden
- Steam of Life (Miesten vuoro) – Joonas Berghäll and Mika Hotakainen • Finland/Sweden

=== Best Short Film ===
Hanoi - Warsaw (Hanoi - Warszawa) – Katarzyna Klimkiewicz • Poland

- Amor – Thomas Wangsmo • Norway
- Lights (Ampelmann) – Giulio Ricciarelli • Germany
- Joseph’s Snails (Les escargots de Joseph) – Sophie Roze • France
- Stay, Away (Blijf bij me, weg) – Paloma Aguilera Valdebenito • Netherlands
- Out of Love (Ønskebørn) – Birgitte Stærmose • Denmark
- Venus VS Me – Nathalie Teirlinck • Belgium
- The Little Snow Animal (Lumikko) – Miia Tervo • Finland
- Tussilago – Jonas Odell • Sweden
- Maria's Way – Anne Milne • United Kingdom/Spain
- Talleres Clandestinos – Catalina Molina • Austria/Argentina
- Rendezvous in Stella-Plage (Rendez-vous à Stella-Plage) – Shalimar Preuss • France
- Diarchy (Diarchia) – Ferdinando Cito Filomarino • Italy/France
- The External World – David O'Reilly • Germany
- Here I Am (Itt vagyok) – Bálint Szimler • Hungary

=== People's Choice Award for Best European Film ===
Mr. Nobody

- The Girl Who Played with Fire (Flickan som lekte med elden)
- Soul Kitchen
- Baarìa
- Loose Cannons (Mine vaganti)
- An Education
- Agora
- The Ghost Writer
- Kick-Ass
- Little Nicholas (Le Petit Nicolas)
