= Schäublin =

Schäublin is a surname. Notable people with the surname include:

- Cyril Schäublin (born 1984), Swiss filmmaker
- Fritz Schäublin (1867–1951), Swiss footballer and educator
