= Unrest (2022 film) =

- Promotional release poster
- Directed by: Cyril Schäublin
- Release dates: 14 February 2022 (Berlinale); 17 November 2022 (Switzerland)
- Running time: 93 minutes
- Country: Switzerland
- Languages: Swiss, German

Unrest (German: Unruh, French: Désordres) is a 2022 Swiss historical drama film written and directed by Cyril Schäublin and starring Clara Gostynski and Alexei Evstratov. It premiered at the 72nd Berlin International Film Festival, where it screened in the Encounters section and where Schäublin won the Best Director award.

== Plot ==
New technologies are transforming a 19th-century watchmaking town in Switzerland. Josephine, a young factory worker, produces the unrest wheel, swinging in the heart of the mechanical watch. Exposed to new ways of organizing money, time and labour, she gets involved with the local movement of the anarchist watchmakers, where she meets Russian traveller Pyotr Kropotkin.

== Release ==
The film was released theatrically in Switzerland on 17 November 2022, distributed by Filmcoopi Zürich AG, in Germany on 5 January 2023 by Grandfilm GmbH, and in Austria on 7 January 2023 by Filmgarten Distribution. It opened in Spain on 10 February 2023 via Lost and Found, and in Croatia on 23 February 2023 through Discovery Film and Video Distribution. In France, it was released on 12 April 2023 by Shellac Films, and in the United States on 5 May 2023 by KimStim. It was released in Serbia on 28 September 2023 through Five Stars Film Distribution. The film was also distributed in Greece by Videorama LTD – Weirdwave, and in Taiwan by Cineplex Development.

== Reception ==
On Rotten Tomatoes, Unrest holds an approval rating of 87% based on 23 critic reviews. According to Metacritic, which assigned a weighted average score of 75 out of 100 based on 9 critics, the film received “generally favorable reviews”.

In Variety, Jessica Kiang wrote that “Unrest” “rebels beautifully against the tyranny of things having to happen in a movie” and suggested Schäublin as “a singular new filmmaking talent”. Writing in The Economist, Nicolas Rapold notes that Schäublin’s off-kilter framing can “suggest that an alternate order might be afoot”. Vogue’s Lisa Wong Macabasco called it “delightfully subversive” and said it “provokes contemplation … of structured time and ruthless capitalism”. Among other notices, the Los Angeles Times described the film as “meticulous and mischievous,” while RogerEbert.com called it “an intriguing period piece”.

== Accolades ==
Year	Organization	Category	Film	Result
2023	Premiers Plans Angers Film Festival	Grand Jury Prize	Unrest	Won
2022	Beijing International Film Festival	Tiantan Award – Best Picture	Unrest	Won
2022	Berlin International Film Festival	Best Director	Unrest	Won
2023	Cahiers du Cinéma	Annual Top 10 List	Unrest	Won
2023	Entrevues Belfort Film Festival	Ciné+ Award	Unrest	Won
2022	Golden Apricot Yerevan International Film Festival	Special Mention	Unrest	Won
2022	Jeonju International Film Festival	Best Picture	Unrest	Won
2018	Muestra de Cine de Lanzarote	Best Film	Unrest	Won
2018	Swiss Film Awards	Best Film	Unrest	Nominated
2023	Swiss Film Awards	Best Camera	Unrest	Won
2023	Swiss Film Awards	Best Film	Unrest	Nominated
2022	Viennale	FIPRESCI Prize	Unrest	Won
