= Born to Be King (2000 film) =

2000 Hong Kong film by Andrew Lau

- DVD cover

Chinese name
- Traditional Chinese: 勝者為王
- Simplified Chinese: 胜者为王
Transcriptions
- Directed by: Andrew Lau
- Written by: Manfred Wong
- Produced by: Raymond Chow; Manfred Wong
- Starring: Ekin Cheng; Jordan Chan; Gigi Lai; Jason Chu; Peter Ho; Roy Cheung; Shu Qi; Jerry Lamb; Chin Kar-lok; Michael Tse; Alex Man; Sandra Ng; Vincent Wan
- Cinematography: Andrew Lau
- Edited by: Danny Pang Phat
- Music by: Chan Kwong-wing
- Distributed by: Gala Film Distribution Limited
- Release date: 21 July 2000
- Running time: 118 minutes
- Country: Hong Kong
- Languages: Cantonese; Mandarin; Min Nan; Japanese; English
- Box office: HK$7,709,039

Born to Be King (Chinese: 勝者為王) is a 2000 Hong Kong crime film directed by Andrew Lau. It is the sixth and final sequel to the Young and Dangerous film series.

== Synopsis ==
Chicken (Jordan Chan) is set to marry the daughter of a Japanese yakuza boss (Sonny Chiba). When Chicken is set up, his old pals return to clear his name.

== Plot ==
The story starts with Chan Ho-Nam (Ekin Cheng) still being paranoid about the horrific death and his relationship with Smartie (Gigi Lai) which constantly gives him nightmares. After having Mei Ling (Shu Qi) hinting that she wants to marry Ho-Nam, he shows little to no reaction due to the fear of losing another loved one. That night, he goes to his pub only to be noticed that Chicken (Jordan Chan) was set up by Taiwan's San Leun Triad to be married into a Yakuza family as a political marriage. On that wedding day in Japan, Ho-Nam met with Akira Kusakari (Roy Cheung), the Yakuza leader's adopted son. At the wedding venue, Hung Hing's attending members were met by Chicken's cousin and one of the district leaders of the Taiwanese gang San Leun, Koh Chi-Wah (Blackie Ko) who then introduced him to the son of San Leun's dragonhead, Lui Fu-Kwan (Peter Ho), Jason (Jason Chu) and Michael (Michael Tse) after the meeting, the wedding started and ended in hilarity.

After the wedding, Hung Hing's attending members like Ben-Hon (Vincent Wan) and Sister 13 (Sandra Ng) followed Chi-Wah to a restaurant to celebrate. Out of happiness for his cousin and the recent victory of Chen Shui-bian as the new Taiwanese president, he over enthusiastically sang a Hokkien song which irritated a bunch of Chinese nationals behind the group which soon turned into a brawl with the Chinese splashing tea on Chi-Wah. Chicken and Akira stopped the brawl in time and the next day, Chiang Tin-Yeung (Alex Man) finally met Ichio Kusakari (Sonny Chiba) who discussed about a tripartite alliance between them, Hung Hing and San Leun but Chiang announces his retirement to return to Thailand and declares that his position and all affairs of Hung Hing will be passed on to Ho-Nam. Hearing of Chiang's plans for retirement, Ichio too thought of retiring and leaving the business to the younger generation where he picked Chicken as his successor. After the meeting, Ichio praised Hung Hing's members for their strength and agility and curiously asked if they knew anything about Kendo. Chiang jokingly told Ichio that he may pass some knowledge to them where soon, a Kendo match was held and Ho-Nam took the plate and fought Ichio who managed to initially beat Ho-Nam by disarming him. Not be seen as a loser or a weakling, Ho-Nam used his countless battle skills on the streets of Hong Kong into good use by tying his weapon to his hand and fought mostly single-handedly as he is accustomed to and forced Ichio into a draw. Back in Taiwan, San Leun was also having a meeting to talk about the new leadership of the gang. Fu-Kwan denied the request to be the new dragonhead as his long period of stay in the US has made him unfamiliar with Taiwan despite being Taiwanese so Chi-Wah recommended Chicken due to his contribution to the gang but Chicken himself also denied the request as he had no ambitions to be the dragonhead and stated that "Picking a dragonhead shouldn't be about his nationality or whether he's a Taiwanese or can he speak Min-Nan language but more of courage and tenacity". Due to the constant rejection from another gang leader to appoint Chicken as the new suggested dragonhead, Chi-Wah again nearly came up to brawl with the other person. A few days later had passed and Fu-Kwan was met with an accident. As the dispute about the new San Leun's leadership contention wasn't settled, Chicken was instantly blamed for causing the crash but as he arrived at the hospital after receiving the news, he declared he's not the one to do it and Fu-Kwan believes him. Despite the infighting, Chicken was brought to a meeting with an old Taiwanese mafia boss who told the ones present that the situation is changing and the new government wants nothing but for the gangsters to cooperate with them. Chicken went to ask a veteran gang leader on his views. After that, both Chicken and Chi-Wah went to a karaoke lounge to have fun and a bunch of girls flirted with them. Suddenly, a girl that was on top of Chicken took out a dagger and tried to stab him; he saw the dagger, fought her off and both guys flee the lounge. Both fled towards a road but found both sides to be surrounded by gangsters of unknown origin and the two guys instantly fought their way out. However, Chi-Wah blocked the gangsters off for Chicken to run away only for him to be hit in the head and lying on the ground with Chicken fighting to get him out but failed and saw Chi-Wah being beaten to death while being extricated. At the same time, Nanako (Anya Wu), Chicken's wife, was alone at home and Akira came to visit drunk. While Nanako was taking care of him, he professed that he had always loved Nanako but it was his father's mistake to not let them be together and forcefully raped Nanako.

While taking care of his still-shaken wife, Chicken's buddies, Ho-Nam and friends, came to Taiwan to find out what was happening. Knowing how the current politics is useless and in disarray and his support, Chi-Wah, dead, Ho-Nam declares his full support for Chicken together with Dai-Tau/Big Head (Chin Kar-lok) and Pou-Pan (Jerry Lamb). However, Chicken told Ho-Nam not to worry as he'll settle his own issue and their arrival to support him had already made him happy. Ho-Nam then went to meet Mei Ling who was shopping. She's late due to buying a watch for Ho-Nam but with Ho-Nam passing the watch back to her, in a fit of anger, she storms off and at the corner of his eye, he saw a girl that looked very much like Smartie. Curious, he followed her to her workplace at an kindergarten and both had a chat and learnt that her name is Rong Yu and she's also from Hong Kong and both became friends. At the safehouse where Chicken was hiding, his underling noticed a bunch of cars approaching the house and in a panic, shouted that their under attack. Whilst preparing for an ambush, it turned out that the "unknown personal" was Ichio sitting on a wheelchair who came to look for Nanako and Chicken. After comforting Nanako, Ichio explained to Chicken that Akira was a traitor who sold the Yakuza's evil deeds to the police and Akira was the cause of his disability. Vowing for vengeance for both Ichio and Nanako, Chicken promises to kill Akira. At the meantime, Fu-Kwan was released from hospital and it was revealed that the assassination attempt on Chicken and Chi-Wah was all along orchestrated by Fu-Kwan to rid Chicken from San Leun. Ho-Nam then met with Fu-Kwan who questioned San Leun's internal conflict and their intentions on dealing with Chicken. Fu-Kwan, again lied and said that he had never doubted Chicken to be the one that caused him to be hospitalized but directly after Ho-Nam left the meeting, it was shown that both Akira and Fu-Kwan had always been working with each other in getting rid of Chicken. Ho-Nam then went to meet with Rong Yu and Mei Ling, who had always sensed that Ho-Nam was odd, followed him in the shadows and noticed both Rong Yu and Ho-Nam together. Mei Ling then followed Rong Yu back to the kindergarten where she voiced her displeasure about her relationship to Rong Yu.

At the funeral of another contender of the leadership of San Luen (The one that had bad blood and gave advice to Chicken earlier in the show), things escalate out of control when Chicken entered the funeral hall and the whole of San Luen mobbing him. To control the situation, Ho-Nam took out a pistol and fired warning shots in the air. At the same time, Ichio entered the hall and declared that till Chicken is deemed the traitor, his life will be in Ichio's hands and if Chicken is found guilty, he will end Chicken's life himself. After the funeral, Chicken and Hung Hing's other members discuss plans on crippling Fu-Kwan's rising power. Knowing that he's already aligned himself with the new government and had planned to rename San Leun something else, they estimated that attacking Fu-Kwan head-on will be suicidal due to his ties with the government. During Chen Shui-bian's inauguration day, Fu-Kwan gave a speech on his ambitions of incorporating all gangs in Taiwan into an umbrella cooperation and plans to combine both Chi-Wah's "Black Panther Gang" and Chicken's "Venom Snake Gang" into a new entity with Akira at the helm. Chicken and the whole of Hung Hing bursts into the arena and Chicken declared Fu-Kwan the betrayer of San Leun with a traitor spilling out that the assassinations that had happened were all plotted by Fu-Kwan. With his family in Hung Hing's hands (The ploy Hung Hing came out with to threaten Fu-Kwan's power), the strategist of the gang had no choice but to spill the beans that what Chicken and the traitor who accused Fu-Kwan was right as everything that's happening to San Leun was done by Fu-Kwan. Soon after, the official who negotiated with Fu-Kwan also declared that the deal between San Leun and the government is off due to the ridiculous request of Fu-Kwan. Sensing defeat, Fu-Kwan slowly backs away from the crowd only to pull a pistol and firing a few rounds before fleeing with Akira. Ho-Nam and the rest gave chase. Akira nearly escaped but only to land himself in a hall where Ichio was waiting with Chicken for him. Surrounded by both ends, Akira instantly acts pitiful and asks for forgiveness. However, Ichio was having none of it and threw Akira a Wakizashi to commit hara-riki but instead of using it on himself, he flipped the dagger towards Ichio only to be disarmed by Ichio himself and dropped the dagger. Chicken then promptly took the dagger and stabbed Akira to death. At the same time, Ho-Nam was still chasing Fu-Kwan and both of them were driving themselves into a head-on collision. Both were not injured and soon climbed on top of their cars and continued fighting. Ho-Nam beats him easily but Fu-Kwan again draws his pistol on Ho-Nam. Ho-Nam, having no fear, inches closer to Fu-Kwan's barrel and few seconds later, the police arrives to arrest Fu-Kwan.

The story ends with Ichio thanking the Taiwanese official for his assistance and revealed that Ichio himself can actually speak Mandrin all along.

== Cast ==
- Ekin Cheng – Chan Ho Nam
- Jordan Chan – Chicken Chiu
- Gigi Lai – Rong Yu (also played Smartie in a flashback)
- Jason Chu – Jason (also played Chow Pan / Banana Skin in a flashback)
- Peter Ho – Lui Fu-Kwan
- Roy Cheung – Akira Kusakari (Nihongo: 草刈明, Kusakari Akira)
- Shu Qi – Mei Ling
- Jerry Lamb – Pou-pan
- Chin Kar-lok – Big Head
- Michael Tse – Michael
- Sonny Chiba – Ichio Kusakari (Nihongo: 草刈一千男, Kusakari Ichio)
- Alex Man – Cheung Tin Yeung
- Sandra Ng – Sister 13
- Vincent Wan – Ben Hon
- Anya Wu – Nanako (Nihongo: ななこ, Nanako)
- Chen Sung-young – Brave
- Chin Shih-chieh
- Blackie Ko – Ko Chi-wah
- Lam Sheung Yee – Father Lam
- George Wang Chueh – Taiwan government official
