= 2002 (film) =

2001 Hong Kong film by Wilson Yip

- Hong Kong film poster
- Directed by: Wilson Yip
- Written by: Vincent Kok; Derek Kwok; Szeto Kam-Yuen; Wilson Yip
- Produced by: Vincent Kok
- Starring: Nicholas Tse; Stephen Fung
- Cinematography: Poon Hang-sang
- Edited by: Cheung Ka-fai
- Music by: Tommy Wai
- Production company: GH Pictures
- Distributed by: Golden Harvest
- Release date: 15 December 2001
- Running time: 94 minutes
- Country: Hong Kong
- Language: Cantonese
- Box office: HK$7,984,660

2002 is a Hong Kong science fiction action film directed by Wilson Yip and starring Nicholas Tse and Stephen Fung.

== Plot ==
Tide Yau is a special agent from a police force known as 2002. He, however, is not an ordinary police officer and has the ability to see ghosts. In the beginning Tide's partner is Sam, however it is Sam's time to reincarnate and so a new partner must be found. The new partner comes in the form of Wind Cheng, who can also see ghosts. Wind (apart from being afraid of ghosts) thinks it is great being the partner of Tide and everything runs smoothly until Wind finds out that the unit only operates as human-ghost partnerships, so in order for the pair to continue working for 2002, one of them must die.

== Cast ==
- Nicholas Tse as Inspector Tide Yau
- Stephen Fung as Wind Cheng Ting-fung
- Law Kar-ying as Paper Chan
- Rain Li as Rain
- Sam Lee as Sam
- Danielle Graham as Nurse Danielle
- Alex Fong as Water Ghost
- Anya Wu as Fire Ghost
- Lee Lik-chi as Police Precinct Head Tang
- Vincent Kok as Rain's doctor
- Candy Hau as Grandma Four
- Joe Lee as Head of 2202 unit
- Joe Cheng as Police Precinct Head
- Chim Wah-leung as Police Officer Kau
- Jimmy Fu
- Natalie Tong as Female student
- Andy Tsang as Gambler ghost
- Tam Wai-ho as Siu Ho
- Terence Tsui as Muscle ghost
- Poon An-ying as Paper Chan's customer

== Release ==
The film had a brief running in the United Kingdom on the short-lived TV channel CNX.

== See also ==
- List of Hong Kong films
