= Haibin Du =

Chinese actor

Haibin Du (born in 1972, Chinese: 杜海滨), a native of Baoji, Shaanxi, China, is a documentary filmmaker from China.

== Biography ==
He was born in Shaanxi province in Northwest China in 1972. He began working in documentary filmmaking and photography in 1998.

He graduated from the photography department at Beijing Film Academy in 2000. He teaches film at the China Academy of Art.

== Awards ==
He has won various awards including a Best Documentary award for 1428 at the 66th Venice International Film Festival.

== Filmography ==
- Doudou (1999)
- Along the Railway (2000), director
- Under High-rise Buildings (2002)
- Beautiful Men (Renmian Taohua) (2005), director
- From Childhood (2006)
- Stone Mountain (2006), director
- Umbrella (film) (Sǎn) (2007), director
- 1428 (2009), director
- A Young Patriot (2015), director
- Wo gen zhe ni (2021), producer
- Mr. Tang (2022), editor

== See also ==
- China Screen
