= Foxtrot (2017 film) =

2017 film

- Film poster
- Hebrew: פוֹקְסטְרוֹט
- Directed by: Samuel Maoz
- Written by: Samuel Maoz
- Produced by: Eitan Mansuri
- Starring: Lior Ashkenazi; Sarah Adler
- Cinematography: Giora Bejach
- Edited by: Arik Lahav Leibovich; Guy Nemesh
- Music by: Ophir Leibovitch; Amit Poznansky
- Production companies: Spiro Films; Pola Pandora Filmproduktions; A.S.A.P. Films; KNM Production; Bord Cadre Films; Arte France Cinéma
- Release date: 2 September 2017 (Venice)
- Running time: 112 minutes
- Countries: Israel; Germany; France; Switzerland
- Language: Hebrew

Foxtrot (Hebrew: פוֹקְסטְרוֹט) is a 2017 internationally co-produced drama film written and directed by Samuel Maoz. It stars Lior Ashkenazi and Sarah Adler as a couple who are informed that their son, an IDF soldier, was killed in action.

The film was screened in the competition section of the 74th Venice International Film Festival where it won the Grand Jury Prize Silver Lion. It was also screened in the Special Presentations section at the 2017 Toronto International Film Festival. It won the Ophir Award for Best Film, therefore becoming the Israeli entry for the Best Foreign Language Film at the 90th Academy Awards. Later in the year, it made the December shortlist, but ultimately did not receive a nomination.

== Plot ==
Michael and Daphna Feldman, an affluent Tel Aviv couple, learn that their son, Jonathan, a soldier, has died in the line of duty. The Israel Defense Forces (IDF) refuse to inform the distraught parents where and how Jonathan died, or if his body had been recovered. Several hours later, they are notified almost matter-of-factly that there has been a mix-up, and that it was some other Jonathan Feldman who has been killed. An angry Michael demands that the IDF allow Jonathan to return home. Although they promise that Jonathan will return by the next day, Michael demands his son return immediately and calls in a favour to have Jonathan's homecoming hastened.

In a remote outpost Jonathan and three other soldiers man a desolate checkpoint. They spend their nights in a converted cargo container that is slowly tipping into the mud. To pass the time, Jonathan tells the story of how his father once traded a treasured heirloom that had been preserved through the holocaust for a porn magazine. Late one night, Jonathan kills four young Palestinians after one of the soldiers mistakes a beer can that rolled out of the Palestinians' car for a grenade. The soldiers call in the incident and more senior IDF officers arrive, bringing a bulldozer to bury the car with its deceased occupants inside. The men are warned by a senior IDF officer not to disclose the accident. At the end of their discussion the IDF officer receives a call from Michael's connection and tells Jonathan he will be returning home with him.

Six months later Michael and Daphna reunite for their son's twentieth birthday. It is revealed that Jonathan died on his way home and Michael and Daphna have separated as they both blame Michael's impatience for Jonathan's death. Michael and Daphna get high together and ponder over the meaning of their son's final drawing, an illustration of a bulldozer carrying a car, with each suggesting that their spouse is the bulldozer and they are the car. Michael also finally admits that during his time in the army he witnessed the death of several members of his unit which he blamed himself for. He viewed Jonathan's birth as absolution for the deaths while Daphna was conflicted by her pregnancy and wanted an abortion.

In the final scene as Jonathan is being driven back to Tel Aviv, the military vehicle in which he is riding on a narrow, rutted desert road swerves to avoid a camel and rolls down an embankment.

== Cast ==
- Lior Ashkenazi as Michael Feldman
- Sarah Adler as Daphna Feldman
- Yonathan Shiray as Jonathan Feldman
- Shira Haas as Alma Feldman, Michael and Daphna's daughter
- Yehuda Almagor as Avigdor, Michael's brother
- Karin Ugowski as Michael and Avigdor's mother
- Ilia Grosz as Daphna's sister

== Reception ==
=== Critical reception ===
On review aggregator website Rotten Tomatoes, the film holds an approval rating of 94% based on 141 reviews, with an average rating of 8.20/10. The website's critical consensus reads, "Foxtrot uses topical themes to deliver a bruising sociopolitical statement that's equally effective taken simply as an absorbing, well-acted drama." On Metacritic, the film has a weighted average score of 88 out of 100, based on 34 critics, indicating "universal acclaim".

=== Accolades ===
The film won Grand Jury Prize award at the Venice Film Festival in 2017.

It was nominated for thirteen Ophir Awards including Best Picture, Best Director, Best Lead Actor and Best Supporting Actress.

=== Controversy ===
Because Foxtrot depicts the Israel Defense Forces covering up the shooting of four Arab youths, it was denounced by Israel's Minister of Culture Miri Regev after it won the Grand Jury Prize at Venice. Regev referred to the film as "the result of self-flagellation and cooperation with the anti-Israel narrative". In response, the film's director Samuel Maoz said, "If I criticize the place I live, I do it because I worry. I do it because I want to protect it. I do it from love."

In a follow-up statement, Regev said it was "outrageous that Israeli artists contribute to the incitement of the young generation against the most moral army in the world by spreading lies in the form of art."

== See also ==
- List of submissions to the 90th Academy Awards for Best Foreign Language Film
- List of Israeli submissions for the Academy Award for Best Foreign Language Film
