= 24th European Film Awards =

2011 film awards ceremony in Germany

- Date: 3 December 2011
- Site: Tempodrom, Berlin, Germany
- Hosted by: Anke Engelke
- Organized by: European Film Academy

Highlights
- Best Picture: Melancholia
- Best Direction: Susanne Bier

Television coverage
- Channel: Arte, HBO

The 24th European Film Awards were presented on 3 December 2011 in Berlin, Germany. The winners were selected by the over 2,500 members of the European Film Academy.

== Winners and nominees ==
The nominations for the 24th European Film Awards were announced on 5 November.

=== Best Film ===
English title	Original title	Director(s)	Production country
Melancholia	Melancholia	Lars von Trier	Denmark, Sweden, Italy, Germany, France
The Artist	The Artist	Michel Hazanavicius	France
The Kid with a Bike	Le Gamin au vélo	Jean-Pierre Dardenne & Luc Dardenne	Belgium, France, Italy
In a Better World	Hævnen	Susanne Bier	Denmark, Sweden
The King's Speech	The King's Speech	Tom Hooper	Great Britain
Le Havre	Le Havre	Aki Kaurismäki	Finland, France, Germany

=== Best Director ===
Director(s)	Nationality	English title	Original title
Susanne Bier	Denmark	In a Better World	Hævnen
Jean-Pierre Dardenne & Luc Dardenne	Belgium	The Kid with a Bike	Le Gamin au vélo
Aki Kaurismäki	Finland	Le Havre	Le Havre
Béla Tarr	Hungary	The Turin Horse	A torinói ló
Lars von Trier	Denmark	Melancholia	Melancholia

=== Best Actress ===
Actress	Nationality	English title	Original title
Tilda Swinton	Great Britain	We Need to Talk about Kevin	We Need to Talk about Kevin
Kirsten Dunst	Germany and United States	Melancholia	Melancholia
Cécile de France	Belgium	The Kid with a Bike	Le Gamin au vélo
Charlotte Gainsbourg	France and Great Britain	Melancholia	Melancholia
Nadezhda Markina	Russia	Elena	Елена

=== Best Actor ===
Actor	Nationality	English title	Original title
Colin Firth	Great Britain	The King's Speech	The King's Speech
Jean Dujardin	France	The Artist	The Artist
Mikael Persbrandt	Sweden	In a Better World	Hævnen
Michel Piccoli	France	We Have a Pope	Habemus Papam
André Wilms	France	Le Havre	Le Havre

=== Best Screenwriter ===
Writer(s)	Nationality	English title	Original title
Jean-Pierre Dardenne & Luc Dardenne	Belgium	The Kid with a Bike	Le Gamin au vélo
Anders Thomas Jensen	Denmark	In a Better World	Hævnen
Aki Kaurismäki	Finland	Le Havre	Le Havre
Lars von Trier	Denmark	Melancholia	Melancholia

=== Best Cinematographer ===
Cinematographer	Nationality	English title	Original title
Manuel Alberto Claro	Denmark	Melancholia	Melancholia
Fred Kelemen	Germany and Hungary	The Turin Horse	A torinói ló
Guillaume Schiffman	France	The Artist	The Artist
Adam Sikora	Poland	Essential Killing	Essential Killing

=== Best Editor ===
Editor	Nationality	English title	Original title
Tariq Anwar	India and Great Britain	The King's Speech	The King's Speech
Mathilde Bonnefoy	France	Three	Drei
Molly Malene Stensgaard	Denmark	Melancholia	Melancholia

=== Best Production Designer ===
Production Designer	Nationality	English title	Original title
Jette Lehmann	Denmark	Melancholia	Melancholia
Paola Bizzarri	Italy	We Have a Pope	Habemus Papam
Antxón Gómez	Spain	The Skin I Live In	La piel que habito

=== Best Composer ===
Composer	Nationality	English title	Original title
Ludovic Bource	France	The Artist	The Artist
Alexandre Desplat	France	The King's Speech	The King's Speech
Alberto Iglesias	Spain	The Skin I Live In	La piel que habitoi
Mihály Víg	Hungary	The Turin Horse	A torinói ló

=== Best Documentary ===
English title	Original title	Director(s)	Production country
Pina	Pina	Wim Wenders	Germany
Position Among the Stars	Stand van de Sterren	Leonard Retel Helmrich	Netherlands
¡Vivan las Antipodas!	¡Vivan las Antipodas!	Viktor Kossakovsky	Germany, Netherlands, Argentina, Chile

=== Best Animated Feature Film ===
The nominees for Best Animated Feature Film were selected by a committee consisting of EFA Board Members and representatives from the European Association of Animation Film.

English title	Original title	Director(s)	Production country
Chico and Rita	Chico & Rita	Tono Errando, Javier Mariscal and Fernando Trueba	Spain and Isle of Man
The Rabbi's Cat	Le Chat du rabbin	Antoine Delesvaux and Joann Sfar	France
A Cat in Paris	Une vie de chat	Jean-Loup Felicioli and Alain Gagnol	France, Belgium

=== Discovery – Prix FIPRESCI ===
The nominees for best feature-film debut were selected by a committee consisting of representatives from EFA and the International Federation of Film Critics.

English title	Original title	Director(s)	Production country
Oxygen	Adem	Hans Van Nuffel	Belgium and the Netherlands
Breathing	Atmen	Karl Markovics	Austria
Michael	Michael	Markus Schleinzer	Austria
Nothing's All Bad	Smukke menesker	Mikkel Munch-Fals	Denmark
Tilva Roš	Tilva Roš	Nikola Ležaić	Serbia

=== Best Short Film ===
The nominees for Best Short Film were selected by independent juries at a series of film festivals throughout Europe.

English title	Original title	Director(s)	Production country
The Wholly Family	The Wholly Family	Terry Gilliam	Italy
Berik	Berik	Daniel Borgman	Denmark
Little Children, Big Words	Små barn, stora ord	Lisa James-Larsson	Sweden
Incident by a Bank	Händelse vid bank	Ruben Östlund	Sweden
Derby	Derby	Paul Negoescu	Romania
Jessi	Jessi	Mariejosephin Schneider	Germany
The Wolves	I lupi	Alberto de Michele	Italy and Netherlands
The Unliving	Återfödelsen	Hugo Lilja	Sweden
Silent River	Apele tac	Anca Miruna Lăzărescu	Germany and Romania
Paparazzi	Paparazzi	Piotr Bernaś	Poland
The Great Race	La gran carrera	Kote Camacho	Spain
Dimanches	Dimanches	Valéry Rosier	Belgium
Out	Tse	Roee Rosen	Israel
Frozen Stories	Opowieści z chłodni	Grzegorz Jaroszuk	Poland
Hypercrisis	Hypercrisis	Josef Dabernig	Austria

== People's Choice Award ==
The winner of the People's Choice Award was selected by online votes.

English title	Original title	Director(s)	Production country
The King's Speech	The King's Speech	Tom Hooper	Great Britain
Animals United	Konferenz der Tiere	Reinhard Klooss and Holger Tappe	Germany
Even the Rain	También la lluvia	Icíar Bollaín	Spain
In a Better World	Hævnen	Susanne Bier	Denmark and Sweden
Little White Lies	Les Petits Mouchoirs	Guillaume Canet	France
Potiche	Potiche	François Ozon	France and Belgium
Unknown	Unknown	Jaume Collet-Serra	Germany, United States, Great Britain
Welcome to the South	Benvenuti al Sud	Luca Miniero	Italy

== See also ==
- 2011 in film
- Cinema of Europe
- List of film awards
