= How Come It's All Green Out Here? =

2025 Serbian drama film

- Festival release poster
- Serbian: Kako je ovde tako zeleno?
- Directed by: Nikola Lezaic
- Written by: Nikola Lezaic
- Produced by: Nikola Lezaic; Marija Lero; Siniša Juričić
- Starring: Filip Đurić; Izudin Bajrović; Stojan Matavulj; Snježana Sinovčić Šiškov
- Cinematography: Aleksandar Pavlović
- Edited by: Jan Klemsche
- Production companies: Qče; Nukleus Film; PREMIERstudio; Forgrade
- Release date: 7 July 2025 (KVIFF)
- Running time: 114 minutes
- Countries: Serbia; Croatia; Bulgaria
- Language: Serbian

How Come It's All Green Out Here? (Serbian: Kako je ovde tako zeleno?) is a 2025 Serbian drama film written and directed by Nikola Lezaic. The film revolves around Nikola, a film director trapped in the world of advertising, purchases an old van with plans to turn it into a camper, dreaming of future road trips with his wife and their baby on the way.

An international co-production, the film premiered at the 59th Karlovy Vary International Film Festival on 7 July 2025, competing for Proxima Grand Prix.

== Synopsis ==
Thirty-four-year-old Nikola, a film director sidelined in the world of advertising, buys an old van with plans to turn it into a camper, dreaming of future road trips with his wife and their soon-to-arrive baby girl. When he finds out that his late grandmother—once a refugee—might finally be laid to rest in her native village in Dalmatia, Nikola sets off on a journey with his 74-year-old father, Mirko. As they revisit a family home untouched for 25 years, Nikola uncovers unexpected reflections on fatherhood, family ties, the passing of time, and the elusive nature of memory.

== Cast ==
- Filip Đurić as Nikola
- Izudin Bajrović as Mirko
- Stojan Matavulj as Branko
- Snježana Sinovčić Šiškov
- Leon Lučev as Neven
- Rada Mrkšić as Dara
- Dobrila Stojnić as Miljka
- Đorđe Erčević as Vojo
- Milica Gojkovic as Aleksandra
- Branka Katić as Marjana

== Release ==
How Come It's All Green Out Here? had its premiere at 59th Karlovy Vary International Film Festival on 7 July 2025, where it competed for Proxima Grand Prix. In August it was showcased at the 31st Sarajevo Film Festival in 'In Focus' section.

It was screened in Survey Expanded: Fragilities at the Thessaloniki International Film Festival on 31 October 2025.

It will compete in the Main Program at the Zagreb Film Festival for Golden Pram Award on 13 November 2025.

== Accolades ==
Year	Award	Category	Recipient(s)	Result	Ref
2025	Karlovy Vary International Film Festival	Proxima Grand Prix	How Come It's All Green Out Here?	Nominated	
2025	Filmfestival Cottbus	DIALOGUE Award for Intercultural Understanding	How Come It's All Green Out Here?	Won	
2025	Zagreb Film Festival	Golden Pram	How Come It's All Green Out Here?	Nominated	
2026	Adriatic Film and TV Awards	Best Lead Actor	Filip Đurić	Nominated	
2026	Adriatic Film and TV Awards	Best Screenplay	Nikola Ležaić	Nominated	
