= Lovely Rita (film) =

2001 film

- Film poster
- Directed by: Jessica Hausner
- Written by: Jessica Hausner
- Produced by: Barbara Albert
- Starring: Barbara Osika
- Cinematography: Martin Gschlacht
- Edited by: Karin Hartusch
- Release date: 2 November 2001
- Running time: 79 minutes
- Country: Austria
- Language: German

Lovely Rita is a 2001 Austrian drama film, a debut feature by Jessica Hausner. It was screened in the Un Certain Regard section at the 2001 Cannes Film Festival.

== Cast ==
- Barbara Osika – Rita
- Christoph Bauer – Fexi
- Peter Fiala – Bus driver
- Wolfgang Kostal – Rita's father
- Karina Brandlmayer – Rita's mother
- Gabriele Wurm Bauer – Fexi's mother
- Harald Urban – Fexi's father
- Felix Eisier – Fexi's brother
- Agnes Napieralska – Rita's sister
- Rene Wanko – Rita's brother-in-law
- Marcia Knoppel – Rita's niece
- Ursula Pucher – Teacher
- Lili Schageri – Alex
- Frau Urban – Alex's mother
- Bettina Grossinger – Colleague

== Plot ==
Rita, a teenage girl, is the only child in the Austrian middle-class family. She leads an extremely boring live, her schoolmates ridicule her, her parents often lock her in her room as a punishment for frequent mischief and outbursts of anger. She rebels against everyone and everything, and the only friend she has is the neighbor boy Fexi. She feels the urge to escape her reality and starts planning a runaway...

== Critical response and accolades ==
Lovely Rita became one of the first genre films in Austria upon the dominance of commercial, box-office oriented movies. Hausner's debut a Haneke-inspired psychological thriller. Filmfest München calls it a milestone of Austrian cinema in 2001. Derek Elley of The Variety described Lovely Rita as 'a deliciously observed, ironic take on middle-class Austrian life' and praised Barbara Osika and Wolfgang Kostal for splendid performance.

The film won European Discovery of the Year Fassbinder Award 2001.

== Sources ==
- von Dassanowsky, Robert; Speck, Oliver C. (2011). New Austrian Film. Berghahn Books. ISBN 978-0-85745-232-0.
