= Anya Wu =

Taiwanese-American actress and singer

- Chinese: 吴安雅
- Born: February 17, 1976 (age 49); Taiwan
- Occupation(s): Actress, singer
- Years active: 2002–present
- Agent: Golden Harvest Company
- Notable work: Naked Weapon; Mysterious Island; Born to Be King
- Spouse: Kong Zhong (m. 2012)
- Children: Son: Aditya Kong, Kiran Kong

Chinese name
- Traditional Chinese: 吳安雅
- Simplified Chinese: 吴安雅
Transcriptions
Standard Mandarin
- Hanyu Pinyin: Wú ānyǎ

Anya Wu (born 17 February 1976) is a Taiwanese-American actress and singer.

== Life ==
=== Early life ===
Wu was born in Taiwan on February 17, 1976. At the age of 6, she immigrated to the United States with her parents. Her mother died of cancer when she was 11.

=== Acting career ===
Wu made her film debut in Andrew Lau's Born to Be King (1999), playing Nanako.

In 2001, Wu participated in many films, such as Cop on a Mission, Runaway and 2000.

Wu rose to fame after portraying Katt in the Hong Kong action-thriller film Naked Weapon (2002). She received positive reviews.

In 2008, Wu was cast in the film Kung Fu Killer, an American Kung Fu film starring David Carradine, Daryl Hannah and Osric Chau.

In 2009, Wu starred in the romantic comedy film Chengdu, I Love You, alongside Guo Tao, Tan Sitar and Huang Xuan.

In 2011, Wu played the lead role in Mysterious Island, a Chinese horror film starring Yang Mi, Jordan Chan and Hayama Hiro.

== Personal life ==
In 2002, she was arrested together with Hong Kong artist William So in Taipei on suspicion of taking and possessing ecstasy. He claimed that he had just ingested ecstasy by mistake, and was sentenced to 11 days of rehab at the Taipei Detention Center, Agency of Corrections, Ministry of Justice in New Taipei City.

Wu married Chinese entrepreneur Kong Zhong (孔众), a direct male-line descendant of Confucius, their son, Aditya Kong (孔垂燊), was born in January 2013. They had another son, Kiran Kong who was born in April 2016.

== Works ==
=== Film ===
Year	English Title	Chinese Title	Role	Notes
2000	Born to Be King	《胜者为王》	Nanako	
2001	Know the Law But Break It	《知法犯法》	Shi An	
2001	Walk theroad	《走投有路》	A killer	
2001	Killer Mace	《杀手锏》	A'yu	
2001	Badboy Weapon	《BadBoy特攻》	A dancer	
2001	Different Ghost	《异灵灵异》	Huo Monǚ	
2002	Fing Head Group	《滥药青春》	guest	
2002	Confidante	《红颜》	The prisoner	
2002	Naked Weapon	《赤裸特工》	Katt	
2003	Play Tricks	《搞鬼》	guest	
2003	Lucky Superman	《行运超人》	Polyset	
2003	Millennium CorpseKing	《千年僵尸王》	Shanshan	
2004	Detective Divinity	《妙探神威》	Zhen Daimei	
2005	Ghost Mom	《鬼妈妈》	Mom	
2005	Death Match	《生死对决》	Hao Panying	
2005	PTU Policewoman Accidentaltrap	《PTU女警之偶然陷阱》	Guimei	
2006	Shanhai Baby	《上海宝贝》	Zhu Sha	
2007	Ghost E-mail	《幽灵信箱》	Lin Xiaoyue	
2007	Single Tribe	《单身部落》	Miss Luo	
2007	The Poppetisa Slam Dunk	《小鬼也灌篮》	The coach	
2008	Kung Fu Killer	《功夫杀手》	Loo Kwan	
2008	Action at Dawn	《黎明行动》	Yingzi	
2009	Chengdu, I Love You	《成都，我爱你》	Wei Hong	
2011	I Know Woman's Heart	《我知女人心》	guest	
2011	Deadly Heart Beat	《夺命心跳》	ghost	
2011	Mysterious Island	《孤岛惊魂》	Chen Liangliang	
2012	Horror Hotel	《恐怖旅馆》	Chen Jiaqian	
2014	But Always	《一生一世》		

=== Television ===
Year	English Title	Chinese Title	Role	Notes
2002		《紫色角落》	guest	
2003	Godfather in Pink	《粉红教父小甜甜》		
2006	Love CRD	《情定CRD》		
2006	Lovelorn High-Heeled Shoes	《失恋高跟鞋》		
2006		《随风飞扬》		
2008	Lost in Los Angeles	《迷失洛杉矶》		
2009	Spanish Love	《情陷巴塞罗那》		
2011	Star City	《星光都市》		
2012	Star City 2	《星光都市2》		
2012		《虎符传奇》		
