= 66th Venice International Film Festival =

Italian film festival in 2009

- Festival poster
- Opening film: Baarìa
- Closing film: Chengdu, I Love You
- Location: Venice, Italy
- Founded: 1932
- Awards: Golden Lion: Lebanon
- Hosted by: Maria Grazia Cucinotta
- Artistic director: Marco Müller
- Festival date: 2–12 September 2009
- Website: Website

Venice Film Festival chronology
- 67th 65th

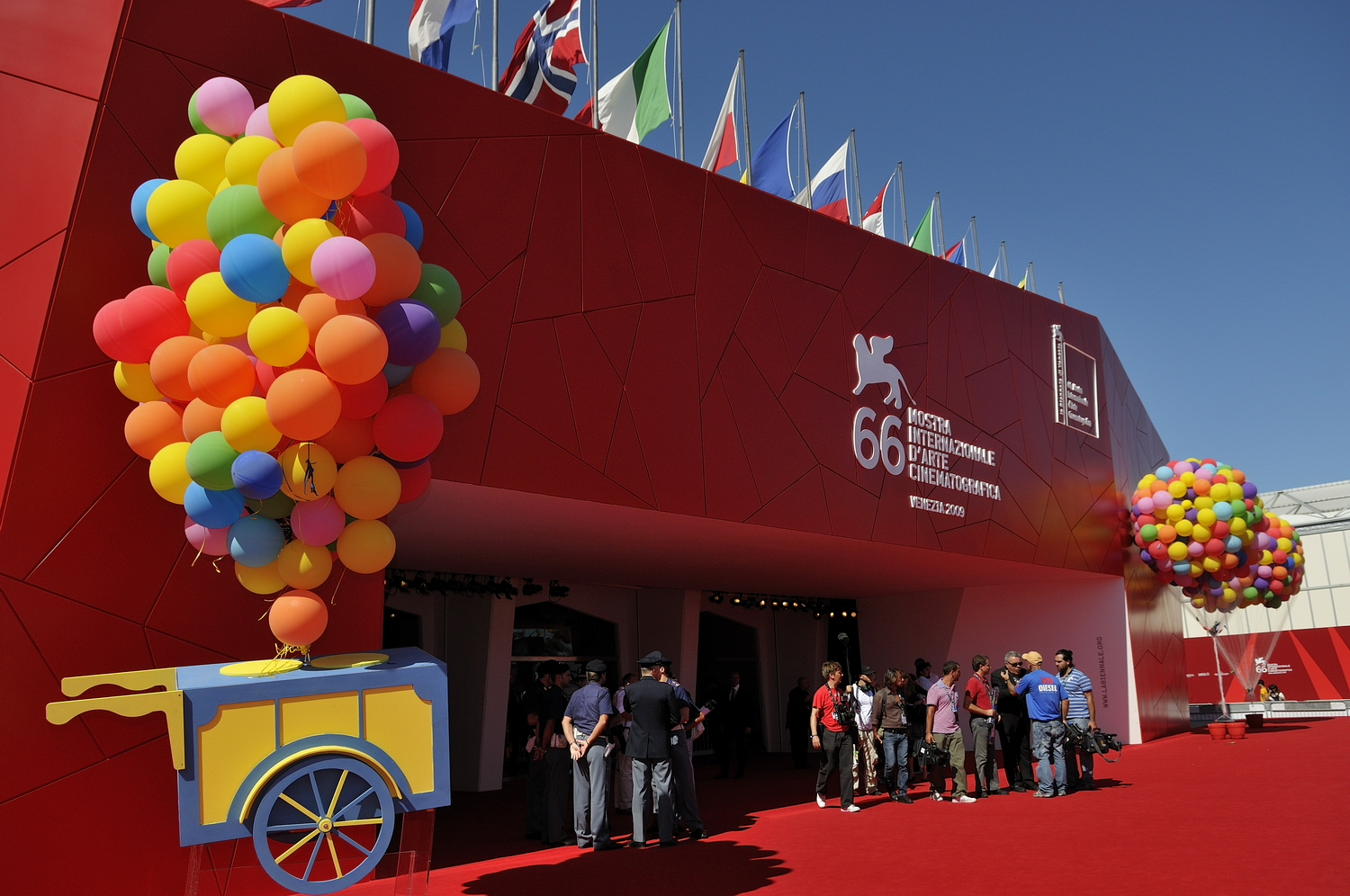
66th Venice International Film Festival

The 66th annual Venice International Film Festival, was held from 2 to 12 September 2009, at Venice Lido in Italy.

Taiwanese filmmaker Ang Lee was the jury president for the main competition. Italian actress Maria Grazia Cucinotta was the Host of the opening and closing ceremonies. The Golden Lion was awarded to Lebanon by Samuel Maoz.

The festival opened with Baarìa by Giuseppe Tornatore, and the closed with Chengdu, I Love You by Fruit Chan and Cui Jian.

== Juries ==
=== Main competition (Venezia 66) ===
- Ang Lee, Taiwanese filmmaker and producer - Jury President
- Sergei Bodrov, Russian filmmaker and producer
- Sandrine Bonnaire, French actress and filmmaker
- Liliana Cavani, Italian filmmaker
- Joe Dante, American director, producer, editor and actor
- Anurag Kashyap, Indian director, writer, producer and actor
- Luciano Ligabue, Italian director, writer and singer-songwriter

=== Orizzonti ===
- Pere Portabella, Spanish politician, director, and producer - Jury President
- Bady Minck, Luxembourger filmmaker and artist
- Gina Kim, South Korean filmmaker and academic
- Garin Nugroho, Indonesian director
- Gianfranco Rosi, Italian director, cinematographer, producer and screenwriter

=== Opera Prima ("Luigi de Laurentiis" Award for a Debut Film) ===
- Haile Gerima, Ethiopian filmmaker - Jury President
- Ramin Bahrani, American director and screenwriter
- Gianni Di Gregorio, Italian director, screenwriter and actor
- Antoine Fuqua, American director and producer
- Sam Taylor-Wood, English filmmaker and photographer

=== Corto-Cortissimo (Short Film Competition) ===
- Stuart Gordon, American filmmaker, theater director and playwright - Jury President
- Steve Ricci, Italian cinematographer, screenwriter and editor
- Sitora Alieva, Russian artistic director of the International Film Festival Kinotav

=== Controcampo Italiano ===
- Carlo Lizzani, Italian director, screenwriter and critic - Jury President
- Giulio Questi, Italian director and screenwriter
- Marina Sanna, Italian chief editor of cinema magazine

== Official Sections ==
=== In Competition ===
The following films were selected for the main competition:

English title	Original title	Director(s)	Production country
Accident	意外	Cheang Pou-Soi	China（Hong Kong）
Around a Small Mountain	36 vues du pic Saint-Loup	Jacques Rivette	France, Italy
Baarìa (opening film)		Giuseppe Tornatore	Italy, France
Bad Lieutenant: Port of Call New Orleans		Werner Herzog	United States
Between Two Worlds	Ahasin Wetei	Vimukthi Jayasundara	Sri Lanka, France
The Big Dream	Il grande sogno	Michele Placido	Italy, France
Capitalism: A Love Story		Michael Moore	United States
The Double Hour	La doppia ora	Giuseppe Capotondi	Italy
Grandmother	Lola	Brillante Mendoza	France, Philippines
Lebanon		Samuel Maoz	Israel, France, Germany, United Kingdom
Life During Wartime		Todd Solondz	United States
Lourdes		Jessica Hausner	Austria
Mr Nobody		Jaco Van Dormael	Belgium, Canada, France, Germany
My Son, My Son, What Have Ye Done		Werner Herzog	United States
Persécution		Patrice Chéreau	France
Prince of Tears	淚王子	Yonfan	Taiwan
The Road		John Hillcoat	United States
A Single Man		Tom Ford	United States
Soul Kitchen		Fatih Akın	Germany
Survival of the Dead		George A. Romero	Canada, United States
Tetsuo: The Bullet Man	Tetsuo Project	Shinya Tsukamoto	Japan
The Traveller	المسافر	Ahmad Maher	Egypt, Italy
White Material		Claire Denis	France
The White Space	Lo spazio bianco	Francesca Comencini	Italy
Women Without Men	Zanan-e bedun-e mardan	Shirin Neshat	Germany, Austria, France, Italy, Ukraine, Morocco

=== Out of Competition ===
The following films were selected to be screened out of competition:

English title	Original title	Director(s)	Production country
Brooklyn's Finest		Antoine Fuqua	United States
Chengdu, I Love You (closing film)	成都我爱你	Fruit Chan and Cui Jian	China
Delhi-6		Rakeysh Omprakash Mehra	India
Dev.D		Anurag Kashyap	India
Great Directors		Angela Ismailos	United States
Green Days	Ruzhaye Sabz	Hana Makhmalbaf	Iran
Gulaal	गुलाल	Anurag Kashyap	India
The Hole		Joe Dante	United States
The Informant!		Steven Soderbergh	United States
The Men Who Stare at Goats		Grant Heslov	United States
Napoli, Napoli, Napoli		Abel Ferrara	Italy
L'oro di Cuba		Giuliano Montaldo	Italy
Rambo (director's cut)		Sylvester Stallone	United States
REC 2		Jaume Balagueró, Paco Plaza	Spain
The Red Shadows	Le ombre rosse	Francesco Maselli	Italy
Rehearsal for a Sicilian Tragedy	Prove per una tragedia siciliana	Roman Paska, John Turturro	Italy
Scheherazade, Tell Me a Story	إحكي يا شهرزاد	Yousry Nasrallah	Egypt
South of the Border		Oliver Stone	United States
Valhalla Rising		Nicolas Winding Refn	Denmark, United Kingdom
Yona Yona Penguin	よなよなペンギン	Rintaro	Japan, France

=== Corto Cortissimo (Short Film Competition) ===
The following films were selected for the Corto Cortissimo (Short film competition) section:

English title	Original title	Director(s)	Production country
In competition
Felicità		Salome Aleksi	Georgia
The Kinematograph	Kinematograf	Tomek Baginski	Poland
I Know There's a Man	So Che C'è Un Uomo	Gianclaudio Cappai	Italy
This Is Earth, My Brother	To je zemljia, brat moj	Jan Cvitkovič	Slovenia, Italy
Still Birds	Alle Fugler	Sara Eliassen	Norway
Bliss	O Teu Sorriso	Pedro Freire	Brazil
The Game	Il Gioco	Adriano Giannini	Italy
Object #1		Murad Ibragimbekov	Russia
Girllikeme		Rowland Jobson	United Kingdom
Firstborn	Eersgeborene	Etienne Kallos	South Africa, United States
Mom's Vacation	Umma-E Huga	Kwang-Bok Kim	South Korea
Storage		David Lea	United Kingdom
Of Clouds and Hands	Nuvole, Mani	Simone Massi	France
Sinner		Meni Philip	Israel
Family Jewels		Martin Stitt	United States, United Kingdom
For Two	Er Ren	Shijie Tan	Singapore
Bicycle	Jitensha	Dean Yamada	Japan, United States
Kingyo		Edmund Yeo	Japan, Malaysia
Out of Competition
Plastic Bag (Opening film)		Ramin Bahrani	United States
The It.Aliens (Closing Film)		Clemens Klopfenstein, Lukas Klopfenstein	Italy, Switzerland
Special Events
Recordare		Leonardo Carrano, Alessandro Pierattini	Italy
The City in the Sky	La città nel cielo	Giacomo Cimini	United Kingdom, Italy
The Second Family	La seconda famiglia	Alberto Dall'Ara	Italy
Earth		Tzu Nyen Ho	Singapore
Radio		Riccardo Pugliese	United States, Italy
War	Uerra	Paolo Sassanelli	Italy
A la lune montante		Annarita Zambrano	France

=== Orizzonti ===
The following films were selected for the Horizons (Orizzonti) section:

English title	Original title	Director(s)	Production country
1428		Haibin Du	China
Adrift	Choi voi	Bui Thac Chuyen	Vietnam
Bets and Wedding Dresses	Tris di donne & abiti nuziali	Vincenzo Terracciano	Italy
Buried Secrets	Dowaha	Raja Amari	Tunisia
Clash	Engkwentro	Pepe Diokno	Philippines
The Color of Words	Il colore delle parole	Marco Simon Puccioni	Italy
Cow	斗牛	Guan Hu	China
Crush	Korotkoe zamykanie	Pyotr Buslov, Alexei German Jr., Boris Khlebnikov, Kirill Serebrennikov, Ivan Vyrypaev	Russia
Francesca (Opening film)		Bobby Paunescu	Romania
I Am Love	Io sono l'amore	Luca Guadagnino	Italy
I Travel Because I Have to, I Come Back Because I Love You	Viajo porque preciso, volto porque te amo	Marcelo Gomes, Karim Aïnouz	Brazil
Judge	透析	Jie Liu	China
The Man's Woman and Other Stories	Aadmi ki Aurat Aur Anya Kahaniya	Amit Dutta	India
The Movie Orgy - Ultimate Version		Joe Dante	United States
Once Upon a Time Proletarian	曾经的无产者	Xiaolu Guo	China
The One All Alone		Frank Scheffer	Netherlands
One-Zero	Wahed-Sefr	Kamla Abou Zekry	Egypt
Paraiso		Héctor Gálvez	Peru
Pepperminta		Pipilotti Rist	Switzerland
Repo Chick		Alex Cox	United States
Sunstroke	Insolação	Felipe Hirsch, Daniela Thomas	Brazil
Tender Parasites	Zarte Parasiten	Christian Becker, Oliver Schwabe	Germany
Totò		Peter Schreiner	Austria
Villalobos		Romuald Karmakar	Germany
Woman on Fire Looks for Water		Woo Ming Jin	Malaysia, South Korea
Horizons Events
Armando Testa - Povero ma moderno		Pappi Corsicato	Italy
The Marriage		Peter Greenaway	Italy, Spain
Reading Book of Blockade	Chitaem 'Blokadnuju knigu'	Alexander Sokurov	Russia
The Death of Pentheus		Philip Haas	United States
La Bohème		Werner Herzog	United Kingdom
Faces of Seoul	Seo-wool eui ul-gul	Gina Kim	United States, South Korea
Hugo en Afrique		Stefano Knuchel	Switzerland
Via della croce		Serena Nono	Italy
Mudanza (short)		Pere Portabella	Spain
Deserto rosa. Luigi Ghirri		Elisabetta Sgarbi	Italy
La Danse: The Paris Opera Ballet	La danse - Le ballet de l'Opéra de Paris	Frederick Wiseman	France, United States
Cock-Crow		David Zamagni, Nadia Ranocchi	Italy
Daimon		David Zamagni, Nadia Ranocchi	Italy

=== Golden Lion for Lifetime Achievement ===
As part of the Golden Lion for Lifetime Achievement 2009, which was conferred to John Lasseter and the Directors of Disney-Pixar, the following American animation films were presented:

- The Incredibles by Brad Bird
- Up by Pete Docter, Bob Peterson
- Toy Story 3-D by John Lasseter
- Toy Story 2 3-D by John Lasseter, Lee Unkrich, Ash Brannon
- Finding Nemo by Andrew Stanton, Lee Unkrich

=== Cortocampo Italiano ===
The following films, representing "new trends in Italian cinema", were screened in this section:

English title	Original title	Director(s)
Cosmonaut	Cosmonauta	Susanna Nicchiarelli
David's Birthday	Il Compleanno	Marco Filiberti
Giuseppe De Santis		Carlo Lizzani
Hollywood on the Tiber	Hollywood sul Tevere	Marco Spagnoli
In the Eyes	Negli occhi	Francesco Del Grosso, Daniele Anzellotti
The Little	Il Piccolo	Maurizio Zaccaro
Poets	Poeti	Toni D'Angelo
Sputnik 5		Susanna Nicchiarelli
Ten Winters	Dieci Inverni	Valerio Mieli

=== Italian Retrospective: These Phantoms 2 ===
For this retrospective section on Italian cinema, 39 feature and 26 short films were screened, including documentaries. The films were mainly from the period 1946 - 1971, with a few only films going back to the 1930s and reaching up to 2009.

English title	Original title	Director(s)
Accidenti alla guerra!... (1948)		Giorgio Simonelli
Break Up (1965)	L'uomo dei cinque palloni	Marco Ferreri
Carmen di Trastevere (1963)		Carmine Gallone
Death of a Friend (1959)	Morte di un amico	Franco Rossi
Dreams Die at Dawn (1961)	I sogni muoiono all'alba	Indro Montanelli, Enrico Gras, Mario Craveri
Easy Years (1953)	Anni facili	Luigi Zampa
Un eroe del nostro tempo (1960)		Sergio Capogna
The Flame That Will Not Die (1949)	La Fiamma che non si spegne	Vittorio Cottafavi
Galileo (1968)		Liliana Cavani
Girl in the Window (1961)	La ragazza in vetrina	Luciano Emmer
The Great War (1959)	La grande guerra	Mario Monicelli
House of Ricordi (1954)	Casa Ricordi	Carmine Gallone
Hurricane Rosy (1979)	Temporale Rosy	Mario Monicelli
The Invisible Ones (1988)	Gli Invisibili	Pasquale Squitieri
Kill the Fatted Calf and Roast It (1970)	Uccidete il vitello grasso e arrostitelo	Salvatore Samperi
Love in Rome (1960)	Un amore a Roma	Dino Risi
The Lovemakers (1961)	La viaccia	Mauro Bolognini
Margherita and Her Three Uncles (1942)	Margherita fra i tre	Ivo Perilli
The Naked Hours (1964)	Le ore nude	Marco Vicario
Nerosubianco (1968)		Tinto Brass
Noi cannibali (1953)		Antonio Leonviola
One Between the Crowd (1946)	Uno tra la folla	Ennio Cerlesi, Piero Tellini
Princess Cinderella (1941)	Cenerentola e il Signor Bonaventura	Sergio Tofano
A Quiet Place in the Country (1969)	Un tranquillo posto di campagna	Elio Petri
The Reunion (1963)	La Rimpatriata	Damiano Damiani
The Ship of Condemned Women (1954)	La nave delle donne maledette	Raffaello Matarazzo
Stories in the Sand (1963)	Storie sulla sabbia	Riccardo Fellini
The Stranger's Hand (1954)	La mano dello straniero	Mario Soldati
Il tramontana (1965)		Adriano Barbano
Tre nel mille (1971)		Franco Indovina
The Wanderers (1956)	I girovaghi	Hugo Fregonese
Women Without Names (1950)	Donne senza nome	Géza von Radványi

== Independent Sections ==
=== Venice International Film Critics' Week ===
The following films were selected for the 24th International Film Critics' Week:

English title	Original title	Director(s)	Production country
In competition
Cafe Noir	Ka-pe-neu-wa-reu	Jung Sung-il	South Korea
A Rational Solution	Det enda rationella	Jörgen Bergmark	Sweden
Domain	Domaine	Patric Chiha	France, Austria
Crawfishlike	Kakraki	Ilya Demichev	Russia
Foxes	Lištičky	Mira Fornay	Czech Republic, Slovakia, Ireland
Tehroun	Téhéran	Nader T. Homayoun	France, Iran
Out of competition
Metropia (opening film)		Tarik Saleh	Sweden
The Pothole (closing film)	Chaleh	Ali Karim	Iran
Videocracy		Erik Gandini	Sweden

=== Venice Days ===
The following films were selected for the 6th edition of Venice Days (Giornate Degli Autori) autonomous section:

English title	Original title	Director(s)	Production country
In competition
The Ape	Apan	Jesper Ganslandt	Sweden
Barking Water		Sterlin Harjo	United States
Blood and Rain	La sangre y la lluvia	Jorge Navas	Colombia, Argentina
Cell 211	Celda 211	Daniel Monzón	Spain, France
Desert Flower		Sherry Hormann	United Kingdom, Germany, Austria, France
Fat People	Gordos	Daniel Sánchez Arévalo	Spain
France	Francia	Israel Adrián Caetano	Argentina
Harragas		Merzak Allouache	Algeria, France
Honeymoons		Goran Paskaljevic	Serbia, Albania
The Horde	La horde	Yannick Dahan, Benjamin Rocher	France
Hymn to Love	L'amore e basta	Stefano Consiglio	Italy
I'm Glad My Mother Is Alive	Je suis heureux que ma mere soit vivante	Claude Miller, Nathan Miller	France
The Last Days of Emma Blank	De laatste Dagen van Emma Blank	Alex van Warmerdam	Netherlands
Mille giorni di Vito		Elisabetta Pandimiglio	Italy
Poetry, You See Me	Poesia che mi guardi	Marina Spada	Italy
Silent Voice	Qu'un seul tienne et les autres suivront	Léa Fehner	France
What Do You Know About Me	Di me cosa ne sai	Valerio Jalongo	Italy
Out of competition
Ragazze la vita trema		Paola Sangiovanni	Italy
The Magliari (1959)	I magliari	Francesco Rosi	Italy, France
Teat Beat of Sex		Signe Baumane	United States
Videocracy		Erik Gandini	Sweden
Vittorio D		Mario Canale, Annarosa Morri	Italy

== Official Awards ==
=== In competition (Venezia 66) ===
- Golden Lion: Lebanon by Samuel Maoz
- Silver Lion for Best Director: Shirin Neshat for Women Without Men
- Special Jury Prize: Soul Kitchen by Fatih Akin
- Volpi Cup for Best Actor: Colin Firth for A Single Man
- Volpi Cup for Best Actress: Kseniya Rappoport for The Double Hour
- Marcello Mastroianni Award: Jasmine Trinca for The Big Dream
- Golden Osella for Outstanding Technical Contribution: Sylvie Olivé for Mr. Nobody
- Golden Osella for Best Screenplay: Todd Solondz for Life During Wartime

=== Horizons (Orizzonti) ===
- Best Film: Engkwentro by Pepe Diokno
- Best Documentary: 1428 by Haibin Du
  - Special mention: The Man's Woman and Other Stories by Amit Dutta

=== Luigi De Laurentis Award for a Debut Film ===
- Engkwentro by Pepe Diokno

=== Short Film Competition (Corto Cortissimo) ===
- Best Short Film: Firstborn by Etienne Kallos
- Venice Nomination to the European Film Awards 2009: Sinner by Meni Philip
  - Special mention: Felicità by Salomé Aleksi

=== Controcampo Italiano ===
- Best Feature Film: Cosmonaut by Susanna Nicchiarelli
  - Special Mention: In the Eyes by Francesco Del Grosso, Daniele Anzellotti

=== Golden Lion for Lifetime Achievement ===
- John Lasseter

=== Special awards ===
- Jaeger-Le Coultre Glory to the Filmmaker Award: Sylvester Stallone
- Persol 3-D Award for Best Stereoscopic Film: The Hole by Joe Dante (Out of competition)

== Independent Sections Awards ==
=== Venice International Film Critics' Week ===
- "Region of Veneto for quality cinema" Award: Tehroun by Takmil Homayoun Nader
- Future Film Festival Digital Award: Metropia by Tarik Saleh
  - Special Mention: Up by Pete Docter

=== Venice Days (Giornati degli Autori) ===
- Label Europa Cinemas Award: The Last Days of Emma Blank by Alex van Warmerdam

== Independent Awards ==
The following collateral awards were conferred to films of the official selection:

=== FIPRESCI Award ===
- Best Film (Main competition): Lourdes by Jessica Hausner
- Best Film (Horizons): Adrift by Bui Thac Chuyen

=== Queer Lion ===
- A Single Man by Tom Ford

=== SIGNIS Award ===
- Lourdes by Jessica Hausner
  - Special mention: Lebanon by Samuel Maoz

=== Francesco Pasinetti Award (SNGCI) ===
- Best Film: The White Space by Francesca Comencini
- Best Director: Giuseppe Tornatore for Baarìa
- Best Actor: Filippo Timi for The Double Hour
- Best Actress: Margherita Buy for The White Space
  - Special award: Riccardo Scamarcio for The Big Dream
  - Special award: Armando Testa – Povero ma moderno by Pappi Corsicato

=== Leoncino d'oro Agiscuola Award ===
- Capitalism: A Love Story by Michael Moore

=== La Navicella – Venezia Cinema Award ===
- Lourdes by Jessica Hausner

=== C.I.C.T. UNESCO Enrico Fulchignoni Award ===
- The Traveller by Ahmad Maher

=== UNICEF Award ===
- Women Without Men by Shirin Neshat

=== Christopher D. Smithers Foundation Special Award ===
- Bad Lieutenant: Port of Call New Orleans by Werner Herzog

=== Biografilm Lancia Award ===
- Best Fiction Film: Mr. Nobody by Jaco Van Dormael
- Best Documentary: In the Eyes by Francesco Del Grosso & Daniele Anzellotti

=== Brian Prize by UAAR ===
- Lourdes by Jessica Hausner

=== Lanterna Magica Award (Cgs) ===
- Cosmonauta by Susanna Nicchiarelli

=== FEDIC Award ===
- The White Space by Francesca Comencini
  - Special Mention: What Do You Know About Me by Valerio Jalongo

=== Arca Cinemagiovani Awards ===
- Best Film: Soul Kitchen by Fatih Akin
- Best Italian Film: The Double Hour by Giuseppe Capotondi

=== Lina Mangiacapre Award ===
- Scheherazade, Tell Me a Story by Yousry Nasrallah

=== Air For Film Fest Award ===
- The White Space by Francesca Comencini

=== Open Award 2009 ===
- Capitalism: A love story by Michael Moore

=== Gianni Astrei Award ===
- The White Space by Francesca Comencini
