= Naked Weapon =

2002 Hong Kong film by Tony Ching

- Promotional poster for Naked Weapon
- Directed by: Tony Ching
- Written by: Wong Jing
- Produced by: Wong Jing; John Chong
- Starring: Maggie Q Anya Wu; Daniel Wu; Jewel Lee
- Cinematography: Choi Sung Fai
- Edited by: Angie Lam
- Music by: Chan Kwong Wing; Ken Chan
- Distributed by: Media Asia Distribution
- Release date: 15 November 2002
- Running time: 90 minutes
- Languages: English; Cantonese

Naked Weapon (赤裸特工) is a 2002 Hong Kong action-thriller film directed by action choreographer Tony Ching, starring Maggie Q, Anya Wu and Daniel Wu.

Written by film producer Wong Jing, Naked Weapon is similar in theme though unrelated to his earlier work Naked Killer (1992). The film revolves around three assassins who get close to their targets, primarily through seduction, before they kill them.

The film grossed HK$72,828 in the first week of release in Hong Kong but quickly dropped in the subsequent month, therefore becoming a box-office bomb.

== Plot ==
The movie opens with the assassination of a man of unknown identity. A team of three CIA officers, including rookie Jack Chen (Daniel Wu), watch through surveillance as an assassin named Fiona Birch (Marit Thoresen) enters the man's heavily guarded apartment suite and, after having sex with him, kills him by breaking his spine with her bare hands during a massage.

As she makes her escape, Fiona's car is hit by a rocket. As the CIA officers rush over to extricate her from the wreckage, they are shot and killed by a woman in a limousine, leaving Jack as the only survivor.

The woman in the limousine is revealed to be Madam M (Almen Wong), the leader of a mysterious assassin organization. After the incident, young girls across the globe start disappearing one after another. The only relationship among them is that they are all trained in martial arts or sports. As Jack correctly theorizes, these girls have been abducted by Madam M and transported to an island to be trained to become professional assassins. After six years of gruesome training, only Charlene Ching (Maggie Q), Katt (Anya Wu) and Jing (Jewel Lee) survive and "graduate." The last test in order for them to graduate was a fight to the death test. Katt and Charlene, being friends, could not kill each other, and so each is accepted as a survivor. To celebrate, Madam M gives them all wines that have drugs in them. As the drugs take effect, Madam M calls her guards to rape the girls, thus (in Madam M's words) making them ready for what was to come.

The three girls are then sent on several missions around the world. During one of her missions in Hong Kong, Charlene runs into her long-lost mother, Faye Ching (Cheng Pei-pei). Jack tracks Charlene down, but Charlene manages to knock him out and escape. Believing she would return to see her mother, Jack waits outside Faye's house. However, Jing arrives before Charlene and stabs Faye. Jack tries to fend her off but fails. Charlene shows up and kills Jing after a fierce fight. She and Jack then escort the wounded Faye to the hospital.

To regain their freedom, Charlene and Katt accept a final mission from Madam M. A yakuza boss, Ryuichi (Andrew Lin), has contracted Madam M to eliminate a traitor in his gang. The mission turns out to be Ryuichi's trap to avenge his partner, who was assassinated previously by one of Madam M's girls (Charlene). Ryuichi kills Madam M and captures Katt, though Charlene escapes.

While Jack is at the hospital, Charlene calls him to meet her at the beach. They have sex, and the next morning, she leaves a note in his shoe saying that if they are destined, they will meet again. When Charlene returns the next day to rescue Katt, she watches helplessly through a bullet-proof glass as Katt, after being tortured, is killed. The enraged Charlene battles Ryuichi in an intense fight and finally manages to kill him.

Jack and Faye are at a Chinese temple offering prayers. Faye jokingly says that the prayers must be nonsense in Jack's point of view. Jack tells her that although he never had a religion, he feels peace every time he is in the temple. Faye commends his behavior and says he should visit the temple more often. Meanwhile, Charlene is in a different temple praying for Katt's soul to rest in peace, and she tells the deity that she wishes to be with the one she truly loves, Jack.

Jack claims at the end of the movie that there are times when he is sure that Charlene is beside him; the last scene of the movie is Charlene watching him rush through the crowd looking for her.

== Cast ==
- Maggie Q as Charlene Ching, kidnapped by Madam M and trained to be a professional assassin, Katt's best friend
- Daniel Wu as Jack Chen, CIA officer on the trail of Madam M and her assassins
- Anya Wu as Katt, kidnapped by Madam M and trained to be a professional assassin, Charlene's best friend
- Jewel Lee as Jing, kidnapped by Madam M and trained to be a professional assassin
- Cheng Pei-pei as Faye Ching, Charlene's mother
- Andrew Lin as Ryuichi, a Yakuza boss
- Almen Wong as Madam M, leader of a mysterious international assassin organization
- Eden Atherton as Susan, the kidnapped girl who leads an escape from the assassin training camp

== See also ==
- Lethal Angels
