= Chengdu, I Love You =

- Film poster
- Directed by: Cui Jian; Fruit Chan
- Starring: Tan Weiwei; Guo Tao; Huang Xuan
- Cinematography: Lam Wah-Chuen
- Release date: September 11, 2009 (Venice)
- Running time: 78 minutes
- Country: China
- Languages: Mandarin; English

Chengdu, I Love You (Chinese: 成都我爱你; translit. Chengdu, Wo Ai Ni) is a Chinese film directed by Cui Jian and Fruit Chan, and released in October 2009. Runtime is 78 minutes with languages in Mandarin and English.

== Venice release ==
Chengdu, I Love You had its world premiere screening in the Sala Grande at the Palazzo del Cinema on Saturday September 12, at 9:00 pm, after the awards ceremony. The 66th edition of the Venice International Film Festival was held at the Venice Lido from 2 to 12 September 2009.

However, only two of the planned three segments were screened. Director Hur Jin-ho's segment set in present-day 2008 was not included, as it was developed into a stand-alone feature film titled A Good Rain Knows.

== Plot ==
The film portrays two love stories centered on Chengdu that spans over a 52-year period in the years of 1976 and 2029.

The 1976 segment, directed by Fruit Chan, is about a family deals with the after effects of a devastating earthquake.

The 2029 segment, directed by Cui Jian, centers on young rock musicians who meet in a Chengdu bar as they pursue their musical dreams.

== Cast ==
- Wu Anya
- Tan Weiwei
- Guo Tao
- Huang Xuan
