= Jessica Hausner =

Austrian film director

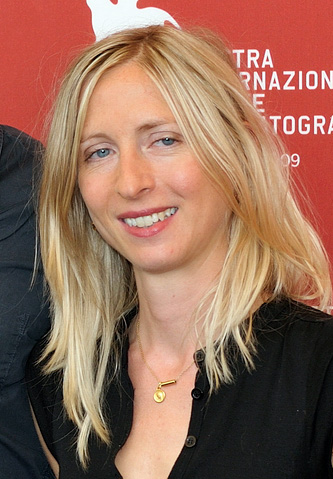
- Hausner at the 66th Venice Film Festival
- Born: 6 October 1972 (age 53); Vienna, Austria
- Occupations: Film director, screenwriter
- Years active: 1995–present

Jessica Hausner (born 6 October 1972) is an Austrian film director and screenwriter, and a professor of directing at Filmacademy Vienna.

== Early life ==
Jessica Hausner is the daughter of Viennese painter Rudolf Hausner, sister of costume designer Tanja Hausner and half sister of set designer and painter Xenia Hausner. She studied at Filmacademy Vienna.

== Career ==
With fellow directors Barbara Albert and Antonin Svoboda and director of photography Martin Gschlacht, she founded the Viennese film production company coop99 in 1999.

Her first films, a short Flora (1995) and diploma Inter-View (1999), were screened at several European film festivals.

She received international attention in 2001 when her film Lovely Rita, a portrait of a young girl who feels confined by family constraints, was screened in the Un Certain Regard section at the 2001 Cannes Film Festival. At that time Austrian cinema was dominated by commercial comedies and the general public was prejudiced against auteur and genre cinema. Art-house oriented and disturbing, Lovely Rita became a breath of fresh air and revitalized Austrian film. In 2002, Hausner was invited to join the jury at the 24th Moscow International Film Festival.

In 2004, she returned to Cannes with her film Hotel, a psychological horror inspired by David Lynch, Stanley Kubrick, and Michael Haneke.

For several years, Hausner stayed in Berlin and assisted Valeska Grisebach. After this break, in 2009 she released Lourdes which is considered by many critics her best film.

Her 2014 film Amour Fou was selected to compete in the Un Certain Regard section at the 2014 Cannes Film Festival.

Her next feature, Little Joe, became her English-language debut, it was sold in 20 countries. The film was selected in Competition at Cannes and brought the lead Emily Beecham the Best Actress award.

Hausner was a jury member at 2011 Cannes in the Cinéfondation & Short Films section; later, in 2016, she was a member of the jury for the Un Certain Regard section of the 2016 Cannes Film Festival, while in 2021 she joined the main jury.

She was appointed a member of the Academy of Motion Picture Arts and Sciences in 2017 which entitled her to vote at the Oscars. In the same year, she was a special guest and mentor at Sarajevo Film Festival.

As of 2023, Hausner is regarded as one of the most outstanding Austrian directors and holds a professorship at the Film Academy Vienna. Her 2023 film Club Zero, starring Mia Wasikowska, was selected to compete for the Palme d'Or at the 76th Cannes Film Festival. The 29th Sarajevo Film Festival paid a tribute to Hausner with a retrospective of her features.

In December 2023, Club Zero's soundtrack, by Markus Binder of the Austrian folk-punk band Attwenger, was awarded best European Soundtrack at the European Film Awards.

In May 2024, Hausner was named the jury president for the main competition of the 77th Locarno Film Festival that August.

== Filmography ==
Short film

Year	Title	Director	Writer	Producer
1994	Kilometer 123,5	No	Yes	No
1995	Flora	Yes	Yes	Yes
2006	The Mozart Minute	Yes	No	No
2017	Glitch Hotel	No	Yes	No

Feature film

Year	Title	Director	Writer
1999	Inter-View	Yes	Yes
2001	Lovely Rita	Yes	Yes
2004	Hotel	Yes	Yes
2006	Toast	Yes	Yes
2009	Lourdes	Yes	Yes
2014	Amour Fou	Yes	Yes
2019	Little Joe	Yes	Yes
2023	Club Zero	Yes	Yes

Producer

- Sleeper (2005)
- Immer nie am Meer (2007)
- Reclaim Your Brain (2007)
- Little Joe (2019)

== Sources ==
- von Dassanowsky, Robert; Speck, Oliver C. (2011). New Austrian Film. Berghahn Books. ISBN 978-0-85745-232-0.
