= Cyril Schäublin =

Swiss filmmaker (born 1984)

- Cyril Schäublin at the 60th New York Film Festival (2022)
- Born: 1984 (age 41–42); Zurich, Switzerland
- Occupation: Filmmaker
- Years active: 2010s–present

Cyril Schäublin (born 1984) is a Swiss filmmaker. His feature films include Those Who Are Fine (2017) and Unrest (2022).

== Early life ==
Schäublin was born in Zurich, Switzerland. Descending from a family of watch-factory workers in the Swiss Jura Mountains, he grew up in Zurich. He studied at Zhongxi, the Central Academy of Drama in Beijing, before continuing his education at the German Film and Television Academy Berlin.

== Career ==
Schäublin's films have premiered at numerous international film festivals, including the Berlin International Film Festival, Locarno Film Festival, Toronto International Film Festival, San Sebastián International Film Festival, Viennale, International Film Festival Rotterdam and the New York Film Festival.

His work has also been screened in institutions like Centre Pompidou in Paris, Kunsthaus Zürich and the Museum of Modern Art in New York.

Critics have noted the distinctive tone and themes of his films. James Quandt wrote in Artforum that his work “demolish[es] Swiss probity,” while The Hollywood Reporter commented that “the Switzerland tourist bureau will probably be less than thrilled”. Jessica Kiang in Variety described him as a “singular new filmmaking talent”, and Jacobin noted that his films “give viewers plenty that they won’t find in films elsewhere.”

Schäublin has cited Robert Walser, Félix Vallotton and Luo Ping as influences on his work.

== Filmography ==
=== Feature films ===
Year	Title	Original title	Director	Writer	Producer
2017	Those Who Are Fine	Dene wos guet geit	Yes	Yes	Yes
2022	Unrest	Unrueh	Yes	Yes	Yes
2028	Mi Di (in development)		Yes	Yes	Yes

== Accolades ==
Year	Organization	Category	Film	Result
2023	Premiers Plans Angers Film Festival	Grand Jury Prize	Unrest	Won
2022	Beijing International Film Festival	Tiantan Award – Best Picture	Unrest	Won
2022	Berlin International Film Festival	Best Director	Unrest	Won
2023	Cahiers du Cinéma	Annual Top 10 List	Unrest	Won
2018	Edinburgh International Film Festival	Best International Film	Those Who Are Fine	Won
2023	Entrevues Belfort Film Festival	Ciné+ Award	Unrest	Won
2018	European Film Awards	European Discovery	Those Who Are Fine	Nominated
2022	Golden Apricot Yerevan International Film Festival	Special Mention	Unrest	Won
2022	Jeonju International Film Festival	Best Picture	Unrest	Won
2017	Locarno Film Festival	Special Mention	Those Who Are Fine	Won
2018	Muestra de Cine de Lanzarote	Best Film	Unrest	Won
2018	Swiss Film Awards	Best Film	Unrest	Nominated
2023	Swiss Film Awards	Best Camera	Unrest	Won
2023	Swiss Film Awards	Best Film	Unrest	Nominated
2022	Viennale	FIPRESCI Prize	Unrest	Won
2018	Zurich Film Award	Best Film	Those Who Are Fine	Won
