= Nikola Ležaić =

Serbian filmmaker

- Born: August 6, 1981; Bor, Serbia
- Occupation: Film Director/Screenwriter/Film Producer

Nikola Ležaić (born August 6, 1981) is a Serbian film director, screenwriter, and film producer.

== Biography ==
He used to draw comics with the local comic group called Smog. Ležaić co-founded literary movement called Metasynchrism. He graduated at the Faculty of Dramatic Arts in Belgrade.

He is mostly known for his first feature film Tilva Roš produced by Film House Kiselo Dete. It is praised as arguably the most internationally acclaimed Serbian film of the last decade and it earned him an EFA Discovery Award Nomination in 2011.

Since 2009, he is the owner of the production company Smog Entertainment formed as a sister company of Film House Kiselo Dete. Smog is the result of Ležaić's wish to produce quirky moviegoer films that don't fit any profile.

He worked as a producer on two projects, Neposlušni directed by Mina Đukić and Pogledaj me, Kusturice by Uroš Tomić.

== Filmography ==
- Tilva Roš (2010), director
- How Come It's All Green Out Here? (2025), director, It will compete for Proxima Grand Prix at the KVIFF.
