= Das unsichtbare Visier =

- Genre: Espionage thriller
- Created by: Peter Hagen
- Written by: Herbert Schauer; Otto Bonhoff; Michel Mansfeld
- Starring: Armin Mueller-Stahl; Horst Schulze
- Theme music composer: Walter Kubiczeck
- Opening theme: Tentakel
- Country of origin: German Democratic Republic
- Original language: German
- No. of seasons: 2
- No. of episodes: 16

Production
- Executive producer: Viet-Peter Treuholz
- Camera setup: Hans-Jürgen Sasse
- Running time: 60-90 minutes
- Production companies: Fernsehen der DDR; DEFA

Original release
- Network: DFF 1
- Release: December 23, 1973 – December 16, 1979

Das unsichtbare Visier (German: [das ˈʔʊnˌzɪçtbaːɐ̯ viˈziːɐ̯], The Invisible Visor) was an East German television series, broadcast between 1973 and 1979. In its first and longest season it starred Armin Mueller-Stahl in the role of Werner Bredebusch, a Stasi agent active abroad under the alias Achim Detjen.

== Cast ==
- Armin Mueller-Stahl: Werner Bredebusch/"Achim Detjen"
- Horst Schulze: Dr. Clemens
- Wolfgang Greese: SS officer Born
- Jessy Rameik: Winnie Winkelmann
- Helmut Schellhardt: Wendland
- Alfred Struwe: General von Wieseneck
- Wilfried Ortmann: Krösing
- Walter Niklaus: CIA agent Wilson
- Siegfried Loyda: Herzog
- Peter Groeger: Roloff
- Hannjo Hasse: Cliff
- Gunter Schoß: Martin Tanner
- Gerry Wolff: Don Salvatore
- Leon Niemczyk: Dr. König
- Marion van de Kamp: Felicitas Eichhofer

== Broadcasts ==
Episode number	Episode name	Original air date	length
01	Der Römische Weg	23 December 1973	84 minutes
02	Das Nest im Urwald	25 December 1973	89 minutes
03	Das Wasserschloß	26 December 1973	86 minutes
04	Ein merkwürdiger Anschlag	2 February 1975	86 minutes
05	Das Geheimnis der Masken	4 February 1975	82 minutes
06	Rätsel des Fjords	25 December 1975	72 minutes
07	Depot im Skagerrak	26 December 1975	89 minutes
08	Mörder machen keine Pause	25 December 1976	68 minutes
09	Sieben Augen hat der Pfau	26 December 1976	90 minutes
10	Der Afrikaanse Broederbond (1)	16 December 1977	63 minutes
11	Der Afrikaanse Broederbond (2)	17 December 1977	60 minutes
12	Der Afrikaanse Broederbond (3)	18 December 1977	67 minutes
13	King-Kong-Grippe (1)	15 December 1978	70 minutes
14	King-Kong-Grippe (2)	17 December 1978	83 minutes
15	Insel des Todes (1)	14 December 1979	84 minutes
16	Insel des Todes (2)	16 December 1979	117 minutes

== See also ==
- List of German television series
