= Lourdes (2009 film) =

- Film poster
- Directed by: Jessica Hausner
- Written by: Jessica Hausner
- Produced by: Philippe Bober; Martin Gschlacht; Susanne Marian
- Starring: Sylvie Testud; Léa Seydoux; Bruno Todeschini; Elina Löwensohn
- Cinematography: Martin Gschlacht
- Edited by: Karina Ressler
- Distributed by: Sophie Dulac Distribution (France)
- Release dates: 5 September 2009 (Venice); 1 September 2009 (Austria)
- Running time: 96 minutes
- Countries: Austria; France; Germany
- Language: French
- Budget: $2 million
- Box office: $530,000

Lourdes is a 2009 film directed by Jessica Hausner. It stars Sylvie Testud, Léa Seydoux, Bruno Todeschini and Elina Löwensohn.

The film had its world premiere at the main competition of the 66th Venice International Film Festival. At the 2009 Vienna International Film Festival the film won the Vienna Film Prize for Best Film.

== Plot ==
Christine (Sylvie Testud) is a wheelchair-using woman with severe multiple sclerosis. Along with a group of other invalids of varying disabilities she makes a pilgrimage to the Sanctuary of Our Lady of Lourdes in the town of Lourdes, France. Christine is assigned a volunteer helper, Maria (Léa Seydoux) who acts as an aid for her and helps to feed and dress her. Christine admits to Maria that she is not particularly religious but that she has been on several pilgrimages as it affords her the possibility of travelling.

Maria develops a crush on Kuno, one of the guards assigned to care for the group. He is, in turn, attentive to Christine. When Maria notices this she abandons her duties and runs off leaving Christine in the care of her roommate who is more mobile than her. That day Christine is able to move her hand on her own.

As the group prepares to return home, the head helper Miss Cécile, abruptly collapses while preparing for the final party. The following day, when Maria comes into her room to dress her for the day she finds Christine already dressed.

The other members of the group are stunned by Christine's marked improvement and encourage her to have it officially recognized by the church. She is seen by a doctor who verifies that, while she still struggles to walk, her ability to do so is outside the realm of what can be explained scientifically and tells her her case will be moved to a committee who will determine whether it is a miracle or not.

Christine is able to attend the last day excursion, which Maria tries to block her from as it was a hike available to the most well members of their group. On the trip other members wonder why Christine was miraculously cured while other, more pious people were not. Christine is oblivious to this and spends some time alone with Kuno.

At the going away party Christine dances with Kuno and then collapses. Though Christine recovers, others begin to doubt that she is cured. Standing on the sidelines she initially refuses to sit down. Eventually she reluctantly sits back in her wheelchair.

== Cast ==
- Sylvie Testud as Christine
- Léa Seydoux as Maria
- Bruno Todeschini as Kuno
- Elina Löwensohn as Miss Cécile
- Gilette Barbier as Mrs. Hartl
- Gerhard Liebmann as Pater Nigl
- Linde Prelog as Mrs. Huber
- Orsolya Tóth as Child in Wheelchair

== Critical response ==
"The remarkable coup of the film is that it can be taken either as a testament to the power of faith or as a subtle undermining of it." The Independent

Peter Bradshaw, writing in The Guardian newspaper called it 'subtle, mysterious and brilliant', awarding it 4 out of 5 stars.

== Awards and nominations ==
- Brian Award at the 66th Venice International Film Festival.
