= Oxygen (2010 film) =

2010 film directed by Hans Van Nuffel

Oxygen (Dutch: Adem) is a 2010 Belgium/Netherlands drama film directed by Hans Van Nuffel, which won Grand Prix des Amériques, the main prize at the Montreal World Film Festival.
