= Muestra de Cine de Lanzarote =

Annual cinema festival in Lanzarote, Spain

- Location: Lanzarote
- Established: 2011
- Founded by: Asociación Tenique Cultural
- Most recent: 21 November — 1 December 2024
- Directors: Javier Tolentino, Víctor Moreno, Javier Fuentes Feo
- Website: muestradecinedelanzarote.com

The Muestra de Cine de Lanzarote is a cinema festival annually held on the island of Lanzarote.

The Festivals was founded in 2011 by Asociación Tenique Cultural and was led by Javier Tolentino and Víctor Moreno. It was created to promote and celebrate European cinema. In 2018, the Festival was headed by Javier Fuentes Feo.

The Festival is noted for its unconventional approach, there is no red carpet, the winners are usually those who don't get proper recognition at similar events. The decisions are open and transparent because the discussions of the jury are live and sometimes the public can intervene. In addition to the Jury Prize, the Youth Jury of the Festival selects the winning picture in its category.

As of 2022, the Festival was sponsored by the Government of the Canary Islands, the Institute of Cinematography and Audiovisual Arts of Spain, the Canary Institute of Cultural Development, etc. The 14th edition took place on the Canary Island between 21 November and 1 December 2024. A Fidai Film a documentary by Kamal Aljafari was awarded the Best Film award.
