= Lebanon (film) =

2009 war drama film

- Film poster
- Directed by: Samuel Maoz
- Written by: Samuel Maoz
- Produced by: Uri Sabag; Einat Bikel
- Starring: Oshri Cohen; Itay Tiran
- Cinematography: Giora Bejach
- Edited by: Arik Leibovitch
- Music by: Alex Claude, David Liss
- Distributed by: Metrodome Distribution (UK)
- Release dates: 8 September 2009 (VIFF); 24 September 2009 (Israel)
- Running time: 90 minutes
- Countries: Israel; United Kingdom; France; Germany
- Language: Hebrew
- Budget: $1.4 million

Lebanon (Hebrew: לְבָנוֹן, romanized: Lvanon; called Lebanon: The Soldier's Journey in the UK) is a 2009 war drama film written and directed by Samuel Maoz. It won the Golden Lion at the 66th Venice International Film Festival, becoming the first Israeli-produced film to have won that honour. In Israel itself the film has caused some controversy. The film was nominated for ten Ophir Awards, including Best Film. The film also won the 14th Annual Satyajit Ray Award.

Maoz based the film on his experience as a young Israeli conscript during the 1982 Lebanon War. The British newspaper The Guardian has described it as an anti-war film.

== Plot ==
The film depicts warfare as witnessed exclusively from the inside of a Sho't battle tank. The crew's window to the outside world is a gunsight. As a way of adding realism to the effect, every change in the horizontal and vertical viewing directions is accompanied by the hydraulic whine of the traversing gun turret. The film is set during the 1982 Lebanon War. There are four Israeli soldiers inside: the driver in the tank's hull, the loader, the gunner and the commander in the turret. For part of the time there is also the body of a dead Israeli soldier (kept there until it is airlifted away), a Syrian POW, a visiting higher officer, and a visiting Phalangist who threatens the POW with torture and a gruesome death.

The soldiers are ordered to clear an area of Lebanese personnel. They are instructed to include the use of phosphorus grenades that are forbidden by international treaty.

The gunner has never fired the cannon in a combat situation and is hesitant at first. As a result, a fellow Israeli soldier is killed along with an innocent man in a subsequent incident involving equally poor judgment. The soldiers have to cope with the deteriorating state of the tank, heat, smoke, filth, stench, cramped quarters, equipment failure, navigational problems, conflicting information and recurring quarrels.

== Cast ==
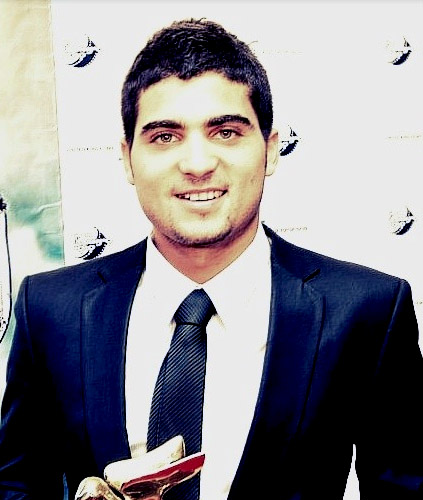
Oshri Cohen with the Golden Lion at the 66th Venice International Film Festival

- Oshri Cohen as Hertzel
- Zohar Strauss as Jamil
- Michael Moshonov as Yigal
- Itay Tiran as Assi
- Yoav Donat as Shmulik
- Reymonde Amsellem as Lebanese Mother
- Dudu Tassa as the Syrian Captive
- Ashraf Barhum as 1st Phalangist

== Reception ==
The film received universal acclaim from film critics. On the review aggregator website Rotten Tomatoes, 90% of 108 critics' reviews are positive, with an average rating of 7.8/10. The website's consensus reads: "A powerful and personal account of war on the front line, writer-director Samuel Maoz takes the viewer inside an Israeli tank to deliver an exhausting, original film." Metacritic, which uses a weighted average, assigned the film a score of 85 out of 100, based on 28 critics, indicating "universal acclaim".

After winning the Golden Lion at the 66th Venice International Film Festival, Maoz said: "I dedicate this award to the thousands of people all over the world who, like me, come back from war safe and sound. Apparently they are fine, they work, get married, have children. But inside the memory will remain stabbed in their soul."

Maoz, when speaking to The Observer stated that he opposes the Israel-related protest call at the 2009 Toronto International Film Festival: "The point of a film like mine is to open a dialogue, to get people talking to each other about important issues. This is something you can't do if films are boycotted. It makes no sense to boycott art. Maybe I wouldn't have won if Jane Fonda was on the jury, but she wasn't." (Note that the open letter at the center of the protest against the spotlighting of Tel Aviv did not call for a boycott of the festival or any of its films.)

The Guardian described it as a "controversial choice", noting that some commentators in Israel have "raised concerns that the film will deter young men from volunteering for the army." It has also been criticised as a "shooting and crying" film. The Golden Lion is the highest award given to an Israeli film to date. Maoz says many Israeli figures were against Lebanon even being featured at the Venice International Film Festival. The Venice jury was chaired by Ang Lee, who had won the Golden Lion award in Venice in 2005 with Brokeback Mountain and in 2007 with Lust, Caution. Lebanon competed against 24 other entries. The win in Venice caused a boost in the film's popularity at the Toronto International Film Festival.

The New York Times described Lebanon as "an astonishing piece of cinema". Variety magazine said Lebanon is "the boldest and best" of recent Israeli films based upon the Lebanon wars.
