= Tilva Roš =

- Directed by: Nikola Ležaić
- Screenplay by: Nikola Ležaić
- Produced by: Uroš Tomić; Nikola Ležaić; Mina Đukić
- Starring: Marko Todorović; Stefan Đorđević; Dunja Kovačević; Marko Milenković; Nenad Stanisavljević; Nenad Ivanović; Filip Maksimović; Miloš Petrović; Nenad Miladinović; Vlatko Ristov; Nikola Milovanović; Boško Đorđević; Aleksandar Pavlović; Milan Radosavljević; Radoje Čupić; Dragana Mrkić; Ljubomir Todorović; Nenad Pećinar; Dragan Stojmenović; Raca Rukavina
- Cinematography: Miloš Jaćimović
- Edited by: Nikola Ležaić
- Production company: Kiselo Dete
- Release dates: July 28, 2010 (Sarajevo); January 26, 2011 (Serbia)
- Running time: 99 minutes
- Country: Serbia
- Language: Serbian

Tilva Roš is a 2010 Serbian coming of age drama following a group of skaters from Bor, a small mining town in eastern part of Serbia, during their first summer after finishing high school.

== Plot ==
Bor, once the largest copper mine, but now just the biggest hole in Europe. Small union protest over the mine privatization is taking place. The plot revolves around Toda and Stefan, two best friends, skaters, who spend their first summer after finishing high school. Stefan's going to Belgrade to the university in fall. Toda says he wouldn't apply to the university even if he had the money. They spend time shooting "Jackass-like" videos they call Crap and hanging out with their friends and Dunja, their friend who came back from France for her holidays. Toda and Stefan get into a quiet battle for her attention and in that strange relationship of dying friendship and rivalry they try to get ahead of each other. Toda gets injured during one of the stunts and goes to a hospital where he learns that he has to apply to the employment bureau in order to get health insurance since he is not a student any more. There he gets a counselor and has to attend meetings on which he will learn new methods of job application. That is how Toda is forced into the bureaucratic world of adults. Spending more time at the counselor's than with his friends makes him annoyed and his quarrels with Stefan slowly become more violent. But when the small union protest evolves into a huge riot their destructiveness will tie them together once again.

== Crap – Pain is Empty ==
Crap – Pain is Empty is a one-hour home-made documentary shot during 2005 and 2006 by Stefan Đorđević, Marko "Toda" Todorović and their skate group. It is influenced by TV-shows like Jackass and Dirty Sanchez. They were still in high school while recording it. Stefan and Toda did almost all stunts with a small contribution of their friends. Stefan edited the film and since then they distributed it for free via DVDs and RapidShare and promoted it on YouTube.

=== Tilva Roš script ===
Nikola Ležaić, writer and director of Tilva Roš, who is also born in Bor got a copy of Crap from his friend, and fell in love with it. He contacted Stefan and Toda and they started hanging out. In that process he decided to make a film based on the video clips Stefan and Toda made, combining them with other real events that happened to them, to him when he was a teenager, and to the town itself, like the union protest that really happened in 2004, and in that way creating a loose fictional plot heavily based on real events. Some stunts recorded for Crap ended up in Tilva Roš. The script was recognized and awarded by two Serbian film funds in 2008. The production started in July 2009 and it was finished in four weeks.

== Casting ==
The idea of kids playing themselves was there from the beginning. The characters are not exact presentations of real Stefan and Toda, the characters have different family backgrounds but they are heavily based on real people. The character of Dunja played by Dunja Kovačević, the art student from Novi Sad, is the only fictional member of the group. She was introduced to the group a week before the start of the production. The only roles played by the real actors are Toda's and Stefan's parents and the karaoke show presenter.

=== Skate team "Kolos" ===
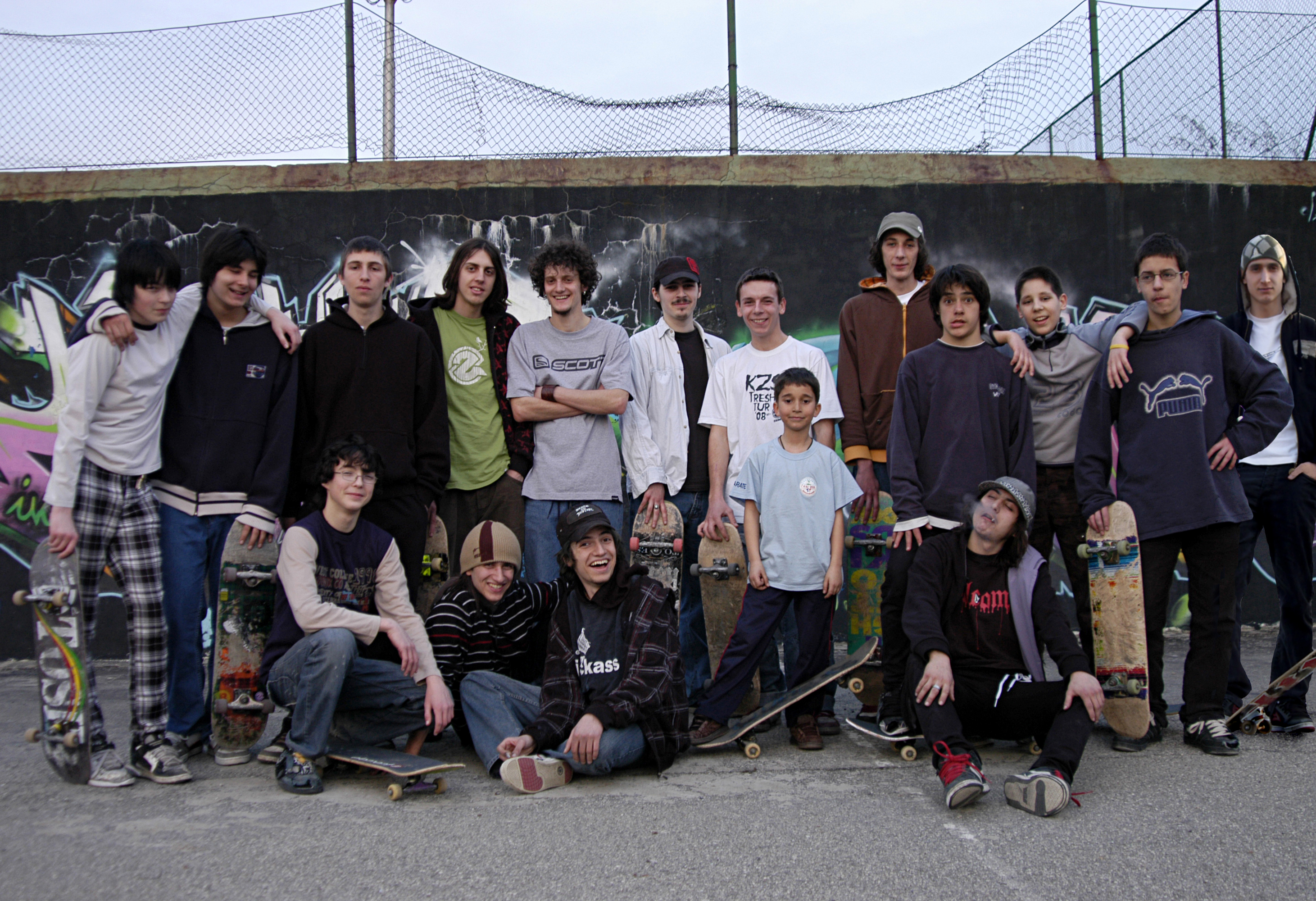
Skate Team Kolos group photo 2009.

Skate team "Kolos" is a skate group created in June 2005. by Stefan Đorđević, Marko Todorović and Marko Milenković as its only members. In next couple of years they spread their interest in skateboarding to younger kids and the team grew rapidly. In 2005. there were only few skaters in Bor but up until 2010. the number grew to around 30. Almost all of them appear in Tilva Roš, and the team is often referenced in the film. Most of them were underage during the production. Together with Skate Team "Zglob" from Negotin and Shorty, graffiti artist from Zaječar, they form KZS (Kolos Zglob Shorty), a kind of eastern Serbian skate alliance numbering more than 50 skaters. In late 2009. skate team Kolos registered NGO in order to gather funds needed for creating a skate park in Bor.

=== Language and dialect ===
The language used in the film is Serbian, spoken in a dialect still widely used in daily parlance in Eastern Serbia. Since a group of people talks simultaneously in almost every scene of the movie, the usage of the dialect relatively uncommon in other areas increases the incomprehensibility of the dialogues, but also makes the scenes appear more realistic.

== Style ==
The film combines "YouTube aesthetics" of the hand-held video clips and long, slow-paced, usually wide shots with complicated mise en scène.

== Title ==
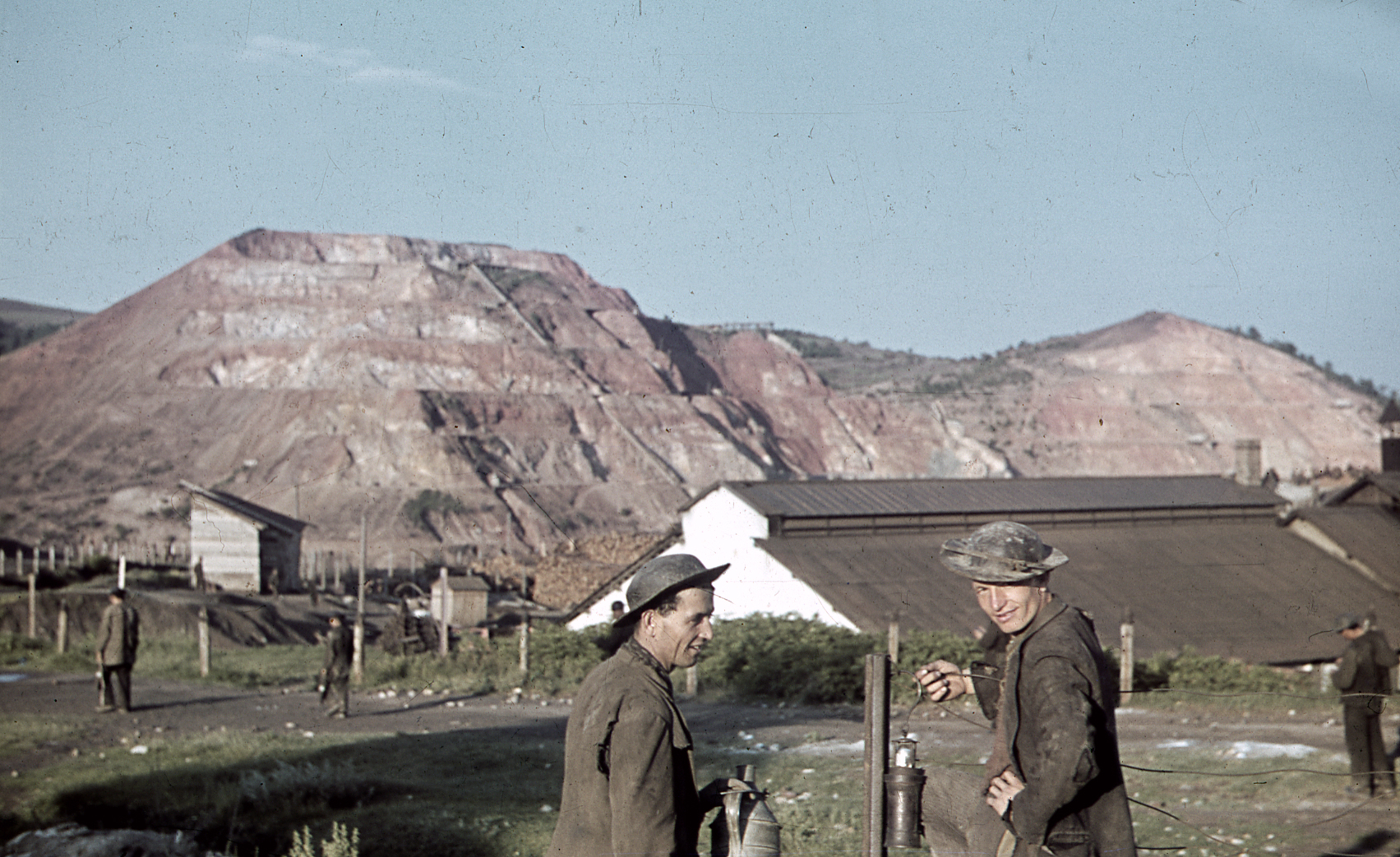
Tilva Roš in the 1940s or 50s

The title Tilva Roš is the name of the area around Bor where the first geological explorations of copper ore were done in the late 19th century. In Romanian spoken by local Vlachs it means "red hill". The hill looked red because it was full of copper ore. This is mentioned in the first scene of the film.

== Soundtrack ==
The soundtrack of Tilva Roš is compiled by several US bands and musicians, and almost all of them donated their music for free. Most of them, like ieatpants, Bobalouie and Siena, Baggy Time and Conjugal Visit are self-published musicians or under some of the Creative Commons licenses. The only artists with publishers are Privacy released by Marriage Records, and Panda Bear released by Paw Tracks. The soundtrack is not officially published yet.

Track listing

1. Privacy – It's only rest
2. Privacy – Some time we had
3. Baggy Time – Between like and love
4. Conjugal Visit – Flipping off the world
5. Baggy Time – I don't dance with daddy
6. ieatpants – My energy, my direction
7. Privacy – Gone
8. Bobalouie and Siena – Everyday thoughts of regular people
9. ieatpants – Unt
10. Panda Bear – Comfy in Nautica

== Reception ==
Tilva Roš had its first screening and the regional premiere in Sarajevo Film Festival where it won the Best feature film award and Marko Todorović won the Best male actor award. The film had its international premiere in Locarno Film Festival. Tilva Roš has been shown on over 20 international festivals including (Rotterdam, Warsaw, Thessaloniki, Miami, Buenos Aires, San Francisco) and was nominated for different awards.

It premiered in Serbia on 26 January 2011 in Bor.

On 11 October 2011 European Film Academy nominated Tilva Roš for the 2011 European Film Awards in the European Discovery – Prix Fipresci section, for the best first feature film in 2011.
