= Samuel Maoz =

Israeli film director (born 1962)

- שמואל מעוז
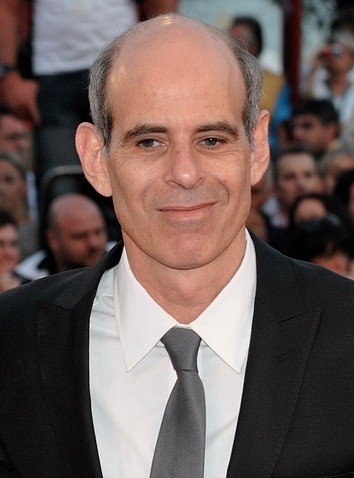
- Born: c. 1962; Tel Aviv, Israel
- Occupation: Film director

Samuel Maoz (Hebrew: שמואל מעוז; born c. 1962) is an Israeli film director. His 2009 film, Lebanon won the Golden Lion at the 66th Venice International Film Festival. He also won the award for Best Screenplay for Lebanon at the Asia Pacific Screen Awards in 2010.

== Biography ==
Samuel (Shmuel) Maoz was born in Tel Aviv. At the age of 20, he was a gunner in one of the first Israeli tanks to enter Lebanon in the 1982 Lebanon War. After the war, he trained as a cameraman at the Beit Zvi theater school, and did art direction in film and television productions.

== Film career ==
As a director, Maoz was associated with the production of documentary films, directing the Arte production Total Eclipse (2000) with Evgenia Dodina. In 2007, Maoz began working on Lebanon, his first feature film. The script, based on Maoz's personal experiences, describes the traumatic experiences of a four-man Israeli tank crew in a Lebanese village early in the war.

At the end of July 2009, Maoz received an invitation to the competition of the 66th Venice Film Festival, where he won the Golden Lion after having had been rejected at the Berlin and the Cannes film festivals.

Lebanon was praised as one of the most compelling competition entries. That same year the film was nominated for the Ophir, Israel's national film awards, in ten categories.

His next film, Foxtrot (2017), won the Grand Jury Prize at the Venice Film Festival.

== Filmography ==
- Total Eclipse (2000)
- Lebanon (2009)
- Foxtrot (2017)
