= 2025 in Belgium =

- Decades: 2000s; 2010s; 2020s
- See also: Other events of 2025; List of years in Belgium

Events in the year 2025 in Belgium.

== Incumbents ==
- Monarch – Philippe
- Prime Minister – Alexander De Croo (until 3 February); Bart De Wever (since 3 February)

== Events ==
=== January ===
- 27 January – Former Belgium national football team player Radja Nainggolan is arrested on suspicion of involvement in cocaine trafficking.
- 31 January – The N-VA, Vooruit, CD&V, MR and LE agree to form a federal coalition government with the N-VA's Bart De Wever as prime minister.

=== February ===
- 3 February – Bart De Wever is sworn in as prime minister.
- 7 February – Following four shootings in the span of a few days in Brussels, the six separate police zones in the city temporarily start working under one command.
- 13 February – Massive protests and a strike are held in Brussels against plans by the De Wever government to reduce public services, resulting in stoppages of bus and tram systems and partial disruptions at Brussels Airport.
- 28 February – Two people are killed in a knife attack at a nursing home in Dentergem. The suspect, a 90-year-old man who was institutionalised at the facility on suspicion of killing his wife, is arrested.

=== March ===
- 13 March – Federal prosecutors announce the arrest of suspects as part of an investigation into the bribery of incumbent and former European Parliament officials by lobbyists linked to the Chinese telecommunications firm Huawei.
- 17 March – Rwanda severs diplomatic relations with Belgium and orders the expulsion of the latter's diplomats from the country after accusing Brussels of attempting to "sustain its neo-colonial delusions" amid the conflict in the Democratic Republic of Congo.

=== April ===
- 7 April – A court in Brussels denies a request by Prince Laurent of Belgium to claim social security benefits, saying that he cannot be considered as either self-employed or an employee.
- 28 April – A massive blackout hits parts of Europe, causing power outages in Belgium.

=== May ===
- 25 May – Union Saint-Gilloise wins the Belgian Pro League for the first time since 1935 after defeating KAA Gent 3-1.

=== June ===
- 30 June – Pope Leo XIV accepts the resignation of Lode Van Hecke as bishop of Ghent.

=== July ===
- 1 July – In the hottest 1 July on record in Belgium, the Royal Meteorological Institute measures a temperature of 34.7 °C.
- 13 July – Belgium becomes the first European country to win the IQA World Cup after defeating Germany 170–90 at the final held in Tubize.
- 16 July – The main stage of the Tomorrowland music festival in Boom is destroyed in a fire two days before the event's opening.

=== August ===
- 7 – 17 August – Belgium at the 2025 World Games

=== September ===
- 2 September –
  - Belgium–Palestine relations: Belgium announces that it would recognize the State of Palestine effective later in the month.
  - Belgium–Israel relations: The government imposes sanctions on Israel, including banning products from Israeli settlements and restricting certain public contracts.
- 10 September – Belgium–Germany relations: The Festival of Flanders in Ghent cancels a performance by the Munich Philharmonic orchestra due to its Israeli conductor, Lahav Shani's views towards the Israeli government.
- 19 September – A cyberattack on a third-party supplier of online check-in services causes major operational disruptions at some European airports, including Brussels Airport.
- 22 September – Belgium formally recognizes the State of Palestine effective after the removal of Hamas from Palestine's governance and the return of hostages.

=== October ===
- 9 October – Three people are arrested in Antwerp on suspicion of plotting drone attacks against Prime Minister de Wever and other politicians.
- 14 October – A nationwide strike is held in protest against a government savings plan, causing massive disruptions in the transportation sector.

=== November ===
- 1–2 November – Unidentified drones are seen flying near Kleine Brogel Air Base in a suspected spying operation.
- 5 November – Unidentified drones are seen flying near Brussels Airport, forcing a suspension of operations.
- 18 November – Belgium qualifies for the 2026 FIFA World Cup after drawing with Bosnia and Herzegovina 1-1 at the 2026 FIFA World Cup qualification.
- 24 November – A three-day national strike is launched in protest against government austerity policies.

=== December ===
- 2 December – Three people, including former EU foreign policy chief Federica Mogherini, are arrested in separate raids on the College of Europe in Bruges and at the headquarters of the European External Action Service in Brussels as part of a fraud investigation involving the awarding of a tender in a European Diplomatic Academy training program.
- 18 December – Over 10,000 farmers from across the EU protest in Brussels against the EU–Mercosur Association Agreement.
- 23 December – Belgium officially joins South Africa's genocide case against Israel at the International Court of Justice.

== Holidays ==
- 1 January – New Year's Day
- 21 April – Easter Monday
- 1 May – Labour Day
- 29 May – Ascension Day
- 9 June – Whit Monday
- 21 July – Belgian National Day
- 15 August – Assumption Day
- 1 November – All Saints' Day
- 11 November – Armistice Day
- 25 December – Christmas Day

== Deaths ==
=== January ===
- 3 January –
  - Gilbert Van Binst, 73, footballer (Anderlecht, Club Brugge, national team).
  - José Brouwers, 93, stage director and actor.
- 7 January – Lucien Cariat, 85, politician.
- 9 January – Marc Michetz, 73, comic book artist (Kogaratsu).
- 10 January –
  - Bram Van Paesschen, 45, filmmaker
  - Michel Schetter, 76, Belgian comic book writer.
- 13 January – André Sollie, 77, author and illustrator.
- 14 January – Marc Hollogne, 63, actor, stage director, and film director (Chance or Coincidence, The Claim).
- 19 January – Pierre Mertens, 85, writer and lawyer.
- 24 January – Eddy Wauters, 91, football player (Antwerp, national team) and manager (Antwerp).
- 27 January – Guy Delhasse, 91, footballer (Liège, K. Beringen F.C., national team).
- 30 January – Andrée Dumon, 102, resistance fighter

=== February ===
- 1 February – Johan Van den Driessche, 71, politician, member of the Parliament of the Brussels-Capital Region (2014–2019).
- 13 February – Paul Pataer, 86, politician, senator (1985–1991, 1992–1995).
- 15 February – Chantal De Spiegeleer, 67, comic book author and artist (Adler, The Curse of the Thirty Denarii).

=== March ===
- 8 March – Simonne Creyf, 78, politician, senator (1991–1995), MP (1995–2007).
- 16 March – Émilie Dequenne, 43, actress
- 31 March – Willy Naessens, 86, industrialist.

=== April ===
- 1 April –
  - Luc Michel, 67, political activist.
  - Yahyah Michot, 72, Islamologist and academic.
- 18 April – Jean Paelinck, 94, economist.
- 19 April – Guy Ullens, 90, art collector and businessman.
- 23 April – Chris Cauwenberghs, 78, actor (Hector, Koko Flanel).

=== May ===
- 3 May – Paul Van Hoeydonck, 99, artist (Fallen Astronaut).
- 29 May – Ludo Dierckxsens, 60, racing cyclist.

=== June ===
- 14 May – Guillaume Bijl, 79, sculptor, conceptual and installation artist.
- 20 May – Helen De Cruz, 47, philosopher.
- 24 May – Georges-Henri Beauthier, 76, lawyer and jurist.

=== July ===
- 2 July – Jean-François Borel, 91, microbiologist and immunologist.
- 3 July – Dany Lademacher, 75, guitarist (Herman Brood and his Wild Romance, Vitesse, The Radios).
- 6 July – Bob Stouthuysen, 96, businessman.
- 8 July – Frans Brouw, 96, Belgian-born Canadian pianist.
- 12 July – Jean-Claude Bernardet, 88, Belgian-born Brazilian writer, actor, and screenwriter.
- 18 July – Michel Van Roye, 73, politician, member of the Parliament of the Brussels-Capital Region (2001–2004).
- 24 July – Jacques Neirynck, 93, Belgian-Swiss writer, politician and academic, emeritus professor at the EPFL.

=== August ===
- 6 August – Sylvio Perlstein, Belgian-Brazilian art collector.
- 7 August – Luc Misson, 72, lawyer (Bosman ruling).
- 12 August –
  - Louis Leloup, 96, stained-glass artist.
  - Bob Maes, 100, politician, senator (1971–1985).
- 15 August – Walter Swennen, 79, painter.
- 17 August – Annie Massay, 94, trade unionist.
- 19 August – Johan Vermeersch, 73, football player (K.V. Kortrijk, Gent) and manager (R.W.D. Molenbeek).
- 20 August –
  - Gérard Chaliand, 91, Belgian-French historian.
  - Paul Kempeneers, 89, philologist and linguist.
  - Marian H. Rose, 104, Belgian-born American physicist and environmentalist.
- 21 August – Patricia du Roy de Blicquy, 81, Olympic alpine skier (1964).
- 23 August –
  - Gerhard Palm, 78, politician, member of the Parliament of the German-speaking Community (1974–2010).
  - Maurice Tempelsman, 95, Belgian-American diamond magnate, CEO of LKI.
- 29 August – Philippe Waxweiler, 81, painter and sculptor.

=== September ===
- 1 September –
  - Walter Godefroot, 82, racing cyclist and team manager.
  - Alfons Van Meirvenne, 92, painter and sculptor.
- 3 September – Pascal Baurain, 55, member of the Parliament of Wallonia (2016–2018, since 2024).
- 7 September – Jean-Marie Séverin, 84, politician, MP (1992–1995), Walloon deputy (1995–1999, 2000–2009).
- 8 September – Philippe Goddin, 81, literary critic (The Adventures of Tintin) and author.
- 10 September – Guido Convents, 69, historian.
- 12 September – Lionel Vinche, 88, painter.
- 17 September – Dominique Wilms, 95, actress (La môme vert-de-gris, The Women Couldn't Care Less, Caesar the Conqueror).
- 21 September – Serdu, 85, cartoonist (Spirou) and illustrator.
- 23 September – Rik Pauwels, 88, footballer (Tubantia Borgerhout) and manager (KSK Beveren, Waterschei Thor).
- 30 September – Bob Van Reeth, 82, architect.

=== October ===
- 1 October – Eric De Rop, 71, comic book artist.
- 6 October – Victor Ginsburgh, 86, economist.
- 15 October – Jackie Berger, 77, dubbing actress.
- 21 October – Fernand Bothy, 99, Olympic boxer (1948).
- 28 October – Frans Melckenbeeck, 84, Olympic road bicycle racer (1960).

=== November ===
- 1 November – Marina Yee, 67, fashion designer (Antwerp Six).
- 3 November – André De Nul, 79, footballer (Lierse, Anderlecht, national team).
- 8 November – Geert Versnick, 68, politician, MP (1994–2010).
- 22 November – Claude Pringalle, 94, Belgian-born French politician, three-time deputy, mayor of Séranvillers-Forenville (1977–2008).
- 29 November – Frank Pé, 69, comic book artist.

=== December ===
- 1 December – Els De Bens, 85, media studies academic.
- 7 December – Glen De Boeck, 54, football player (Anderlecht, national team) and manager (Cercle Brugge).
- 14 December – Roger Laboureur, 90, sports journalist (RTBF).

== See also ==
- 2025 in the European Union
- 2025 in Europe
