= 2024 in Belgium =

- Decades: 2000s; 2010s; 2020s
- See also: Other events of 2024; List of years in Belgium

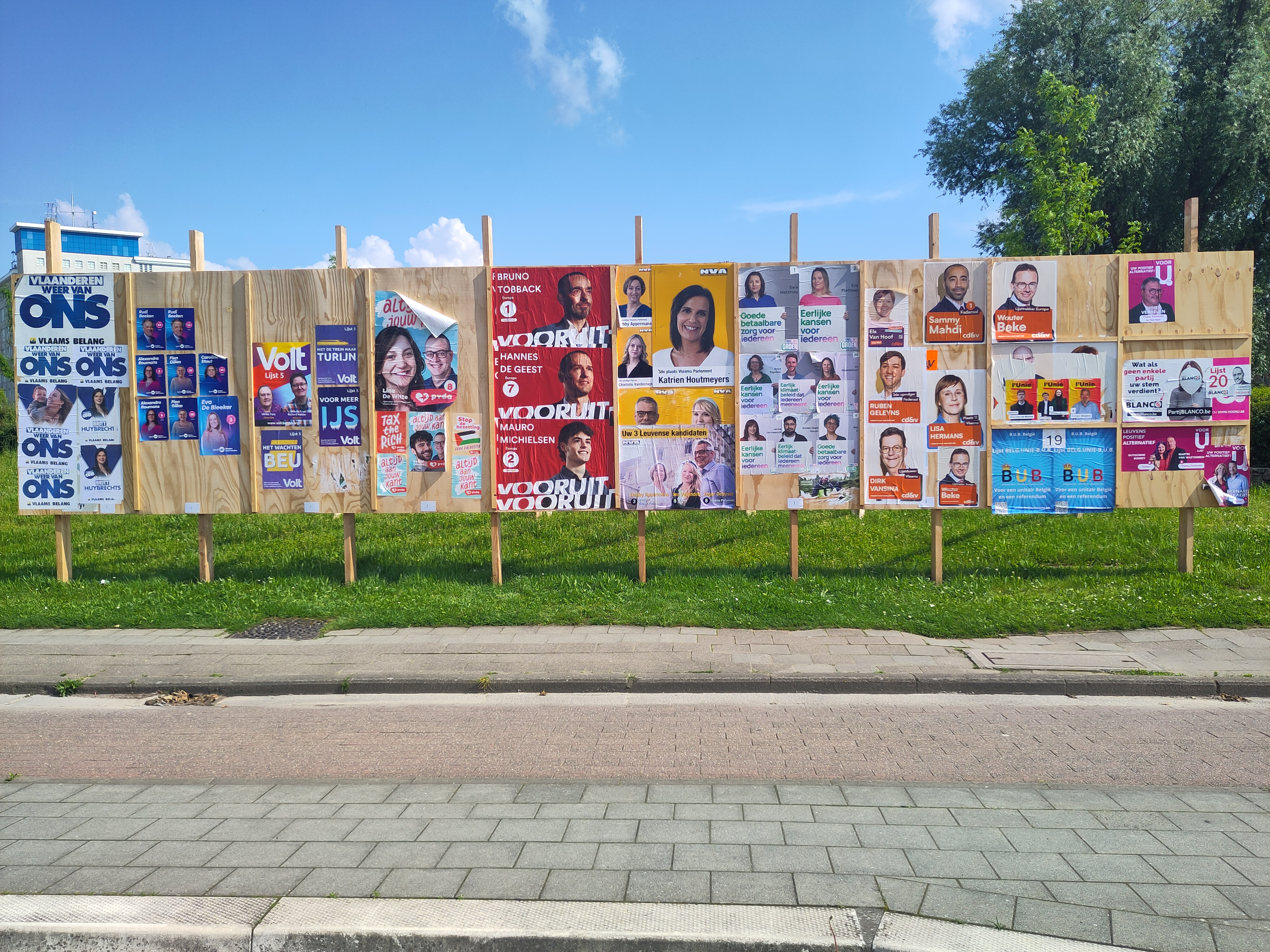
Billboard for the 2024 elections at the Philips site in Leuven

Events in the year 2024 in Belgium.

== Incumbents ==
- Monarch – Philippe
- Prime Minister – Alexander De Croo

== Events ==
=== January ===
- 1 January – 2024 Belgian Presidency of the Council of the European Union begins.

=== February ===
- 1 February – The Monument to John Cockerill is vandalised during farmers' protests in Brussels.
- 13 February – The European Court of Human Rights upholds Flemish and Wallonian bans on the ritual slaughter of animals that have not been stunned.

=== March ===
- 12 March – Far-right political activist and former Vlaams Belang politician Dries Van Langenhove is jailed for one year for Holocaust denial and incitement to violence.
- 18 March – A police officer is killed and two others are injured in a shooting during a house search in Charleroi investigating illegal trade in arms, drugs, and stolen vehicles; the suspect is shot and critically injured by police.
- 21 March – Pope Francis laicizes the Bishop of Bruges, Roger Vangheluwe due to abuse.
- 25 March – Humo magazine and Apache website, both based in Belgium, reveal that politician Filip Dewinter worked as a "senior political advisor" for China for years.

=== April ===
- 12 April – Belgian prosecutors open an investigation into Russian interference in the 2024 European Parliament election.
- 16 April – Brussels police shut down the right-wing National Conservatism Conference attended by Nigel Farage and expected to host Hungarian Prime Minister Viktor Orbán.

=== June ===
- 9 June –
  - 2024 Belgian federal election: Prime Minister Alexander De Croo's governing coalition loses its majority, leading to his resignation. The New Flemish Alliance wins the highest percentage of votes, followed by Vlaams Belang and the Reformist Movement.
  - 2024 Belgian regional elections
- 19 June –
  - The European Commission reprimands Belgium, France, Hungary, Italy, Malta, Poland, and Slovakia for breaking budget rules.
  - Brussels declines to host a UEFA Nations League match between Belgium and Israel over security concerns.

=== July ===
- 23 July – The European Union deprives Hungary of its ability to host the next set of foreign and defense ministry meetings as a "symbolic signal" against Viktor Orbán's uncoordinated meetings in Russia and China, moving the ministry meetings from Budapest to Brussels.
- 26 July – Seven people are arrested on suspicion of terrorist activity in raids on 14 locations nationwide.

=== September ===
- 26–29 September – Pope Francis conducts a three-day visit to Belgium.
- 27 September – Prime Minister Alexander De Croo and King Philippe publicly criticise Pope Francis during their welcome addresses for him over sexual abuses committed by the Roman Catholic Church in Belgium.

=== October ===
- 13 October: 2024 Belgian local elections
- 29 October – A court in Brussels convicts 120 people on drugs charges and sentences them to up to 17 years imprisonment in the biggest drugs-related trial in the country.

=== December ===
- 1 December – A law allowing sex workers to enter into formal employment contracts and avail of standard labour benefits such as standardised working hours, health insurance, paid leave, maternity benefits, unemployment support and pensions comes into effect.
- 2 December – An appeals court in Brussels finds the Belgian state liable for crimes against humanity in a lawsuit filed five mix-raced children who were abducted from their mothers in Belgian colonies in Africa and orders restitution of 50,000 euros to each victim.

== Holidays ==
- 1 January - New Year's Day
- 1 April - Easter Monday
- 1 May - International Workers' Day
- 9 May - Ascension Day
- 20 May - Whit Monday
- 21 July – Belgian National Day
- 15 August - Assumption Day
- 1 November - All Saints' Day
- 11 November - Armistice Day
- 25 December - Christmas Day

== Art and entertainment ==
- List of Belgian European Film Award winners and nominees
- List of Belgian submissions for the Academy Award for Best International Feature Film

== Deaths ==
- 1 January – Camila Batmanghelidjh, 61, Iranian-Belgian charity executive, founder of Kids Company
- 7 January – Bohdan Shershun, 42, Ukrainian footballer
- 8 January – Frans Janssens, 78, footballer
- 16 January – Lise Thiry, 102, scientist and politician
- 20 January – Herbert Glejser, 86, economist
- 23 January – Jan Bogaert, 66, road racing cyclist
- 30 January – Orazio Schena, 82, Italian footballer
- 5 February – Walter van den Broeck, 82, writer and playwright
- 15 February – Nicolas Bergeron, 48, French mathematician
- 16 February – Jan Sørensen, 68, footballer
- 24 February – Benoît van Innis, 63, artist
- 14 March – Léon Semmeling, 84, footballer
- 21 March – Pierre Cordier, 91, artist
- 26 March – André Van Herpe, 90, footballer
- 28 March – Guy Goffette, 76, poet
- 1 April – Phil Delire, 69, music producer
- 8 April – Jaak Gabriëls, 80, politician
- 12 April – Edward Lipiński, 93, Polish-Belgian Biblical scholar and Orientalist
- 20 April – Jean-Marie Aerts, 72, guitarist and producer, member of TC Matic
- 3 May – Paul-Henry Gendebien, 84, economist and politician
- 6 May – Christiane Stefanski, 74, singer
- 15 May – Patrick Moenaert, 75, politician
- 14 June – Christiane Mercelis, 92, tennis player
- 15 June – Freddy Willockx, 76, politician
- 30 June – Gilbert Desmet, 93, cyclist
- 9 July – Josse Goffin, 85, artist and graphic novelist
- 12 July – Ellis Brandon, 101, veteran
- 20 July – Robert Rinchard, 93, race walker
- 17 September – Magda De Galan, 77, politician
- 28 September – Jacques Teugels, 78, footballer
- 13 October – Dominiq Fournal, 68, plastic artist, painter, and photographer
- 17 October – Emile Daems, 86, road racing cyclist
- 17 October – Isabelle de Borchgrave, 78, artist and sculptor
- 23 October – Hugo Weckx, 89, lawyer and politician
- 13 November – Paul Staes, 78, politician
- 28 November – Roeland Raes, 90, politician
- 10 December – Lode Wils, 95, historian and academic
- 10 December – Josy Arens, 72, politician
- 17 December – Rik Van Looy, 90, cyclist
- 19 December – Miet Smet, 81, politician
- 28 December – Émile Lejeune, 86, footballer

== See also ==
- 2024 in the European Union
- 2024 in Europe
