= 2026 in Belgium =

- Decades: 2000s; 2010s; 2020s
- See also: Other events of 2026; List of years in Belgium

Events in the year 2026 in Belgium.

== Incumbents ==
- Monarch – Philippe
- Prime Minister – Bart De Wever
- De Wever government

== Events ==
=== January ===
- 11 January – Customs agents seize 141 kg (311 lb) of cocaine at the Port of Antwerp.
- 29 January – Two people are killed in a fire at an assisted living facility in Ostend.

=== February ===
- 12 February – Police raid the headquarters of the European Commission in Brussels as part of an investigation into the sale of 23 properties to the Belgian state valued at 900 million euros in 2024.
- 13 February – A coalition agreement is reached for the Brussels regional government after a record 20 months of negotiations since the 2024 Belgian regional elections.
- 17 February – The foreign ministry summons US ambassador Bill White over a social media post accusing Belgian authorities of antisemitism over an investigation into unregulated ritual circumcisions in Antwerp.

=== March ===
- 1 March – Belgian special forces, with French naval assistance, seize a Russian shadow fleet oil tanker in the North Sea.
- 9 March – A synagogue in Liège is damaged in a suspected antisemitic attack involving explosives, claimed by a previously unknown group apparently aligning itself with Hezbollah. A Belgian counter-terrorism official later stated that the attack was directly related to calls from Iran.
- 17 March – A court in Brussels orders former diplomat Étienne Davignon to stand trial on charges of participation in war crimes in connection with the 1961 killing of former Congolese prime minister Patrice Lumumba. Davignon is the only surviving individual among those accused by Lumumba’s family of involvement in the case.

=== April ===
- 26 April – The 2026 Liège–Bastogne–Liège cycle race is won by Tadej Pogačar.

=== May ===
- 26 May
  - At 30.3 °C (86.5 °F), Belgium has its hottest 26 May on record, beating the 1985 high of 29 °C (84 °F).
  - Buggenhout train collision with a school bus that ran a level crossing, killing four people and injuring five.

=== June ===
- 11 June–19 July – Belgium participates at the 2026 FIFA World Cup.
- 18–29 June – 2026 European heatwaves associated with 1,222 excess deaths in Belgium.
- 20 June – Emperor Naruhito and Empress Masako of Japan arrive in Belgium on a state visit.

=== July ===
- 1 July – Six people die and many others are hurt in a fire that broke out in a ten-storey block of flats in Antwerp.

=== August ===
- 11 August – A hoard of gold bars and coins worth nine million euros is found bricked into a cellar wall during the demolition of a former brewery in Sint-Gillis-bij-Dendermonde.
- 14–30 August – 2026 Mens and Women's FIH Hockey World Cup in Wavre, Belgium and Amstelveen, Netherlands.
- 14 August – A large wildfire breaks out in the High Fens, destroying a third of the nature reserve's area.

=== September ===
- 24 September – Belgium and Rwanda renew relations after an 18-month break, following a meeting hosted by Qatar in Doha.

=== October ===
- 2 October – The asylum application of Fouad Belkacem, former leader of the jihadist group Sharia4Belgium, is rejected.
- 9 October – The Confederation of Christian Trade Unions and the General Labour Federation of Belgium stage a demonstration in Brussels to protest the government's budget plans.

=== November ===
- 2 November – A cyberattack is carried out on refrigeration systems of supermarkets across seven European countries including Belgium, resulting in financial losses caused by food spoilage.
- 5 November – An LOT flight from Warsaw to Brussels is searched upon landing after being subjected to bomb threats that are subsequently found to be false.

== Deaths ==
- 4 January –
  - Daniel Pelletti, 77, painter.
  - Kamiel Dierckx, 84, basketball player (Belgian Lions).
- 8 January – Wim Van Belleghem, 62, rower.
- 15 January – Marceau Mairesse, 80, politician, senator (1991–1995) and MP (1995–2003).
- 17 January – Dino Attanasio, 100, comics writer and illustrator.
- February – François Beukelaers, 88, actor (Brussels by Night, The Over-the-Hill Band, Stormforce).
- 17 February – José van Dam, 86, operatic bass-baritone.
- 8 April – Charles Delhez, 74, priest and sociologist.
- 18 May – Étienne Davignon, 93, diplomat and civil servant, European commissioner (1977–1985).
- 3 June – Margriet Hermans, 72, singer, senator (2007–2011).
- 18 June – François Englert, 93, theoretical physicist, Nobel Prize laureate (2013).
- 20 June – Mireille Bastin, 83, painter.
- 9 July – Renaud Hardy, 64, convicted serial killer.
- 11 July – Albert Derolez, 91, librarian.
- 13 July – Hervé Hasquin, 83, historian, minister-president of the French Community (1999–2004).
- 15 August – Marcel Neven, 83, politician.
- 13 October – Albert Houssiau, 101, Roman Catholic prelate, bishop of Liège (1986–2001).

== Holidays ==
- 1 January – New Year's Day
- 6 April – Easter Monday
- 1 May – Labour Day
- 14 May – Ascension Day
- 25 May – Whit Monday
- 21 July – Belgian National Day
- 15 August – Assumption Day
- 1 November – All Saints' Day
- 11 November – Armistice Day
- 25 December – Christmas Day

== See also ==
- 2026 in the European Union
- 2026 in Europe
- History of Belgium#2014–present
