= Schena =

Schena is a toponymic surname of Italian origin, meaning "rise" or "bump". Notable people with the surname include:

- Mark Schena (born 1963), American biochemist
- Orazio Schena (1941–2024), Italian football player and coach
