= Wils =

Wils may refer to:

- Jan Wils (1891–1972), a Dutch architect
- Jean-Pierre Wils, a Belgian theologian
- Lode Wils (1929–2024), Belgian historian and academic
- Stef Wils (born 1982), a Belgian footballer
- Thomas Wils (born 1990), a Belgian footballer
- WILS, a radio station in Lansing, Michigan, US
- Wils, Singaporean singer
