= 2027 in Belgium =

- Decades: 2000s; 2010s; 2020s
- See also: Other events of 2027; List of years in Belgium

Events in the year 2027 in Belgium.

== Events ==
=== Predicted and scheduled events ===
- 16–27 June – EuroBasket Women 2027 in Belgium, Finland, Lithuania and Sweden

== Holidays ==
- 1 January – New Year's Day
- 29 March – Easter Monday
- 1 May – Labour Day
- 6 May – Ascension Day
- 17 May – Whit Monday
- 21 July – Belgian National Day
- 15 August – Assumption Day
- 1 November – All Saints' Day
- 11 November – Armistice Day
- 25 December – Christmas Day

== See also ==
- 2027 in the European Union
- 2027 in Europe
