= Le Statut des Moines =

Le Statut des Moines is a short French translation of Muslim jurist Ibn Taymiyyah's Mardin fatwa by Yahyah Michot, published in 1997, under the pseudonym of Nasreddin Lebatelier. The translation is considered a misprint and a misinterpretation of the original.

In 1996, the Algerian Groupe Islamique Armé (Armed Islamic Group or GIA) published an announcement that it considered lawful to murder seven Trappist monks in Tibhirine, under the fatwa.

== History ==
In the misprint of a short fatwa on monks, Ibn Taymiyya is said to have argued that those in the religious orders who were found outside their monasteries might in certain circumstances be killed; they might also be killed if they had dealings with people outside their monastic community. However, in 2010, investigation proved that this fatwa was attributed to a misprint in 1909 edition of the fatwa which originally read "dealt with" instead of "killed."

== Modern use ==
Nearly seven hundred years after it was written by Ibn Taymiyya, this tract was reprinted in 1997 in Beirut by Nasreddin Lebatelier (a pen name of Yahya Michot) under the title Le Statut des Moines, with an introduction which discussed the Groupe Islamique Armé's Communiqué no 43. To the justifications given by the killers, Michot opposed the consensus (ijmâ‘) of the Muslim community which clearly condemned them and he endorsed this consensus. He was nevertheless accused by Catholic authorities and media to have condoned the killing of the seven Trappists. Michot negotiated his departure from the University of Louvain, which paid him a financial indemnity, including 50% of his lawyer's fees. Once appointed as the first Muslim lecturer of Islamic theology in Oxford, Michot faced renewed Catholic hostility, notably in various articles by Margaret Hebblethwaite in The Tablet (22 and 29 August 1998; 12 September 1998) and in an interview of the same activist on BBC 4, Sunday program (27 September 1998). Oxford nevertheless confirmed his appointment.

In 2010, when new evidence emerged that the killings of the fatwa of Mardin were based on a 1909 misprint, that resulted him writing the erroneous translation Le Statut des Moines, he distanced himself from condoning any killings by jihadist groups and denied ever having condoned the actions.
