= Zola Matumona =

Congolese footballer (born 1981)

Personal information
- Date of birth: 26 November 1981 (age 44)
- Place of birth: Kinshasa, Zaire
- Height: 1.65 m (5 ft 5 in)
- Position: Left winger

Senior career*
Years	Team	Apps	(Gls)
2001–2002	AS Vita Club		
2003	FC Saint Eloi Lupopo		
2004–2005	AS Vita Club		
2006	Primeiro de Agosto		
2006–2009	FC Brussels	85	(17)
2009–2012	Mons	75	(14)
2013	Primeiro de Agosto	16	(2)
2014	Mons	9	(0)
2014–2016	Renaissance Kinshasa		

International career
2002–2014	Congo DR	47	(9)
- * Club domestic league appearances and goals

Zola Matumona (born 26 November 1981) is a Congolese former professional footballer who played as a left winger.

== Club career ==
=== Early career ===
Matumona arrived at the AS Vita Club of Kinshasa, one of the biggest clubs in the DR Congo, after spending a season at Styles of Congo, a second division club. He quickly became the darling of the fans club green and black that call him "Room" in reference to his game comparable to the German player, Karl-Heinz Rummenigge. He spent five seasons, won a championship of the Congo, several league titles Kinshasa, he participated in the CAF Champions League and the CAF Cup with his club. He also wins the award for best player of Congo several times before leaving the club.

=== Brussels ===
Matumona landed at FC Brussels in 2007 for a sum of €60,000.

Matumona walked out of FC Brussels on 2 November 2007 after he accused club chairman Johan Vermeersch of making racist remarks towards him during a crisis meeting at the struggling club. Vermeersch was reported to have told Matumona to "think about other things than trees and bananas". The incident also prompted the club's main sponsor, Korean car manufacturer Kia, to withdraw their sponsorship of the Belgian side. But he terminated his contract unilaterally with the club following the racist remarks against him by the President. According to the player's lawyer, Johan Vermeersch had rebuked Matumona and had explained that he "was not in his country and had to forget trees and bananas" in the presence of staff and other players. The lawyer confirms his statements but said it was "a joke". Although on 7 November Matumona agreed to return to FC Brussels after talks with Vermeesch, Kia still refused to renew their contract with the club.

He eventually resumed his contract binding him to the club until 2009 after a meeting with the president who publicly apologized for his remarks.

Matumona later attracted interest from England. After visa problems initially delayed his trial with Birmingham City, he trained with the club during the 2007–08 season and joined their July 2008 pre-season tour, where he impressed manager Alex McLeish in a 3–1 victory over Czech side FC Viktoria Plzeň.

=== Mons ===
Matumona subsequently committed to Mons, a second division club where the coach Rudi Cossey decided to incorporate it within its nucleus for the 2009–10 season.

== International career ==
Matumona made his international debut on 20 August 2002 vs Algeria in a 1–1 draw. He scored his first international goal on 5 June 2005 vs Uganda when Democratic Republic of Congo. won 4–0.

== Career statistics ==
=== International ===
Appearances and goals by national team and year
National team	Year	Apps	Goals
DR Congo	2002	1	0
DR Congo	2004	1	0
DR Congo	2005	7	2
DR Congo	2006	7	0
DR Congo	2007	4	1
DR Congo	2008	7	3
DR Congo	2009	2	0
DR Congo	2010	4	2
DR Congo	2011	6	1
DR Congo	2012	7	0
DR Congo	2013	2	0
DR Congo	2014	2	0
Total		50	9

Scores and results list DR Congo's goal tally first, score column indicates score after each Matumona goal.

List of international goals scored by Zola Matumona
No.	Date	Venue	Opponent	Score	Result	Competition	Ref.
1	5 June 2005	Stade des Martyrs, Kinshasa, Democratic Republic of the Congo	Uganda	4–0	4–0	2006 FIFA World Cup qualification	
2	25 September 2005	Konkola Stadium, Chililabombwe, Zambia	Zambia	2–2	2–2	Friendly	
3	16 June 2007	Independence Stadium, Windhoek, Namibia	Namibia	1–0	1–1	2008 African Cup of Nations qualification	
4	8 June 2008	Stade des Martyrs, Kinshasa, Democratic Republic of the Congo	Malawi	1–0	1–0	2010 FIFA World Cup qualification	
5	13 June 2008	El Hadj Hassan Gouled Aptidon Stadium, Djibouti City, Djibouti	Djibouti	3–0	6–0	2010 FIFA World Cup qualification	
6	13 June 2008	El Hadj Hassan Gouled Aptidon Stadium, Djibouti City, Djibouti	Djibouti	5–0	6–0	2010 FIFA World Cup qualification	
7	11 August 2010	Cairo International Stadium, Cairo, Egypt	Egypt	2–5	3–6	Friendly	
8	11 August 2010	Cairo International Stadium, Cairo, Egypt	Egypt	3–6	3–6	Friendly	
9	27 March 2011	Stade des Martyrs, Kinshasa, Democratic Republic of the Congo	Mauritius	2–0	3–0	2012 African Cup of Nations qualification	
