= Georges-Henri Beauthier =

Belgian lawyer and jurist (1949–2025)

- Born: 16 June 1949
- Died: 24 June 2025 (aged 76)
- Occupation(s): Lawyer, jurist

Georges-Henri Beauthier (French: [ʒɔʁʒ ɑ̃ʁi botje]; 16 June 1949 – 24 June 2025) was a Belgian lawyer and jurist.

== Life and career ==
Born on 16 June 1949, Beauthier was the son of politician Richard Beauthier. A specialist in family law, he served on the legal team of Laëtitia Delhez, one of the victims of pedophile Marc Dutroux. He also defended Philippe Servaty, a journalist on trial for child sex tourism in Morocco, who received an 18-month suspended prison sentence. From 1998 to 2000, he served as president of the French-speaking section of the Human Rights League of Belgium.

In February 2013, Beauthier announced the intentions of his clients, Laëtitia Delhez and Jean-Denis Lejeune to stand before the European Court of Human Rights following a parole request by Marc Dutroux, claiming that his clients' voices had not been heard by the Belgian court.

Also involved in international justice, Beauthier represented several families during the trials of Hissène Habré. He was also involved in filing complaints with the International Criminal Court in connection with the Russian invasion of Ukraine in March 2022, collaborating with Amnesty International Belgique.

Beauthier died on 24 June 2025, at the age of 76.
