= Christiane Stefanski =

Belgian singer (1949–2024)

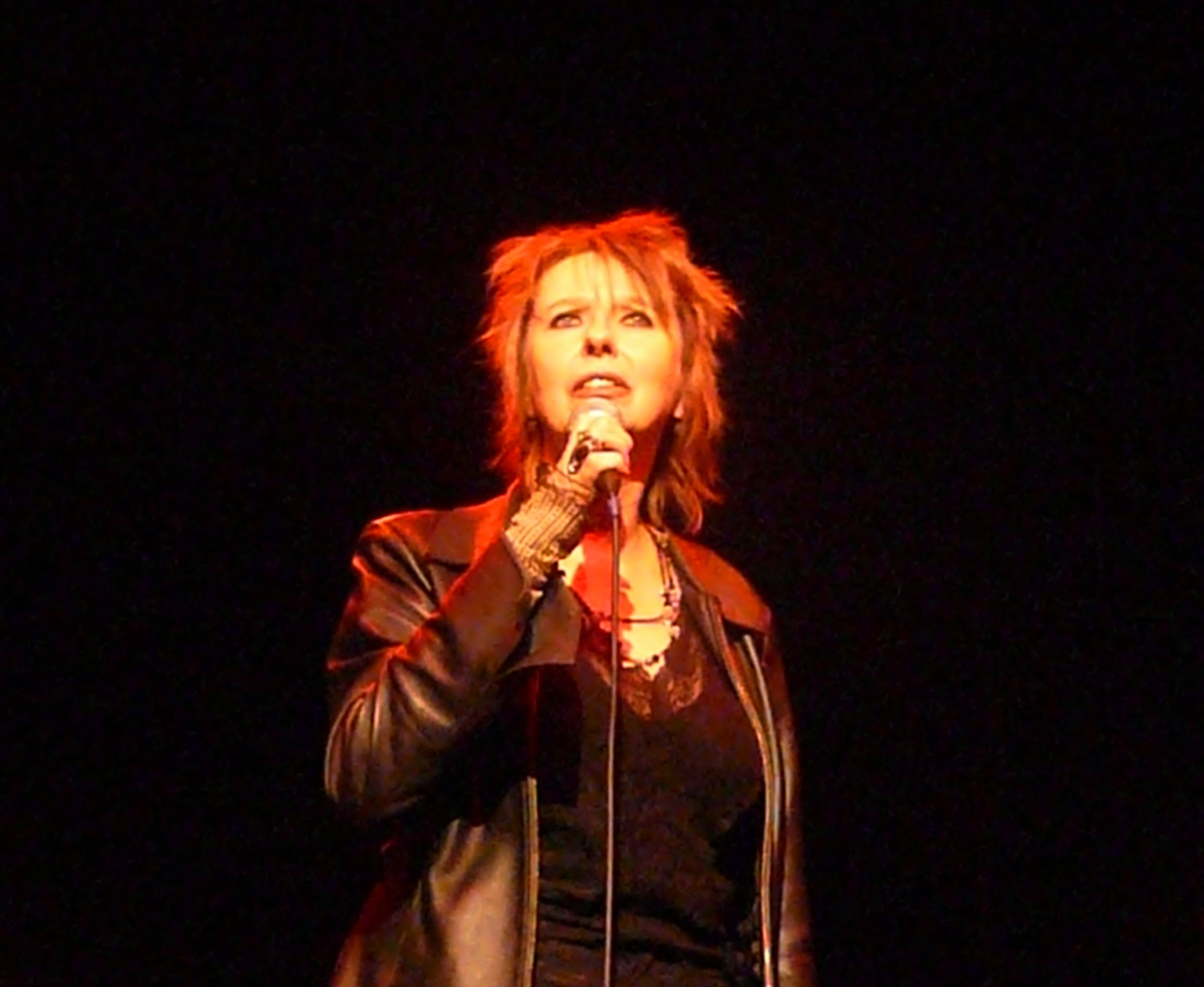
- Stefanski in 2008
- Born: 28 December 1949; Saint-Nicolas, Belgium
- Died: 6 May 2024 (aged 74); Liège, Belgium
- Occupation: Singer

Christiane Stefanski (28 December 1949 – 6 May 2024) was a Belgian francophone singer.

== Biography ==
Born in Saint-Nicolas on 28 December 1949, Stefanski's family was of Polish origin. During her youth, she was part of several folk groups until she began singing in the 1970s. In 1980, she produced her first LP, which featured songs she covered by Anne Sylvestre, Annkrist, and Gilles Servat. Her second album, titled Le pays petit, included songs by Claude Semal and Irène Kaufer. Later that year, she won a prize at the Festival de Spa. In 1984, she released her third album. That year, she was part of the documentary La chanson rebelle, directed by Richard Olivier.

In 1985, Stefanski participated in a youth festival in Moscow and took part in a series of tours in France and Switzerland. In 1987, she founded the band Lush Life with Jacques Stotzem, Thierry Crommen, and André Klenes. In 1994, she released her first CD, titled Carnet de doutes. In January 2007, she recorded the album Belle saison pour les volcans with Stéphane Martini, John Valcke, and Frank Wuyts. The album included her covers of songs by Anne Sylvestre, Léo Ferré, Claude Nougaro, Michèle Bernard, and André Bialek.

Stefanski died in Liège on 6 May 2024, at the age of 74.

== Discography ==
- Autour des usines (1975)
- Jacques Gueux (1976)
- Survivre à Couvin (1978)
- Contr'Eurovision (1979)
- Anti-fascisme et résistance (1979)
- Christiane Stefanski (1980)
- Le pays petit (1982)
- La ville (1983)
- Paroles d'enfants (1985)
- Sud (1985)
- Salasa d'intérieur (1986)
- Carnet de doutes (1994)
- Sawoura (1997)
- Belle saison pour les volcans (2007)
- Droit & Dignité (2008)
