= Belgium–Palestine relations =

- Belgium: Palestine

During the Ottoman occupation of Palestine, Belgium maintained honorary consulates in Jaffa, Jerusalem and Haifa.

Chairman Yasser Arafat made several visits to Belgium, the last of which was in November 2001. In November 2013, Belgium decided to raise the level of Palestinian representation. In February 2015, President Mahmoud Abbas visited Brussels and met with King Philippe.

In 2018, Belgium suspended education aid projects with the Palestinian Authority after discovering that a school it funded in Hebron had been renamed after a militant who took part in the 1978 Coastal road massacre, where 38 Israeli civilians, including 13 children, were killed. The Belgian Foreign Ministry had financed the construction of the school in 2012 and 2013, only to later learn that it was renamed without their knowledge. Belgium also temporarily suspended two other school-building projects.

On 25 April 2023, the Belgian city of Liège took a decision described as "historic" to freeze relations with Israel. Liège has been associated with the Palestinian city of Ramallah in a twinning relationship since 2014.

On 27 October 2023, Belgium was one of 121 countries to vote in favor of a General Assembly resolution calling for an immediate ceasefire to the Gaza war. On 8 November, a month after the conflict began, deputy prime minister Petra De Sutter called for imposing sanctions on Israel.

In November 2023, following a meeting with the President of Egypt Abdel Fattah El Sisi, Prime Minister of Spain Pedro Sánchez, along with Belgian Prime Minister Alexander De Croo, held a joint press conference at the Rafah border crossing with the Gaza Strip. During the conference, both leaders said in a joint statement that the indiscriminate killings of innocent civilians is completely unacceptable. They also said that the time had come for the international community and the European Union (EU) to once and for all recognize a Palestinian State and called for a permanent ceasefire in the Gaza war.

On 1 September 2025, Belgian foreign minister Maxime Prévot announced that Belgium will recognize Palestinian statehood at the 2025 United Nations General Assembly. Prévot stated that the recognition will take effect once all hostages have been released and Hamas has been removed from governance in Palestine.

== High level visits ==
- November 2001 – Chairman Yasser Arafat visits Belgium
- February 2015 – President Mahmoud Abbas visits Belgium
- February 2017 – Prime Minister Charles Michel visits Palestine
- January 2018 – President Mahmoud Abbas visits Belgium

== See also ==
- Foreign relations of Belgium
- Foreign relations of Palestine
- Belgium–Israel relations
