= Paul Kempeneers =

Belgian philologist (1935–2025)

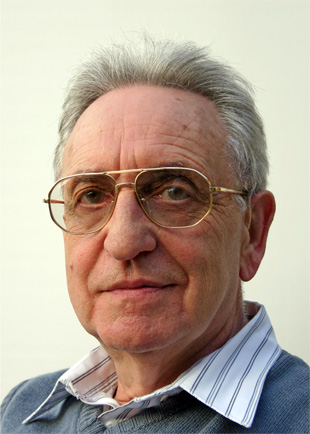
- Kempeneers in 2005
- Born: 9 December 1935; Tienen, Belgium
- Died: 20 August 2025 (aged 89); Tienen, Belgium
- Occupation: Scientist
- Writing career
- Subjects: Dutch language Toponymics; History; Flemish dialects
- Website: www.kempeneers.org

Paul Kempeneers (9 December 1935 – 20 August 2025) was a Belgian philologist and linguist.

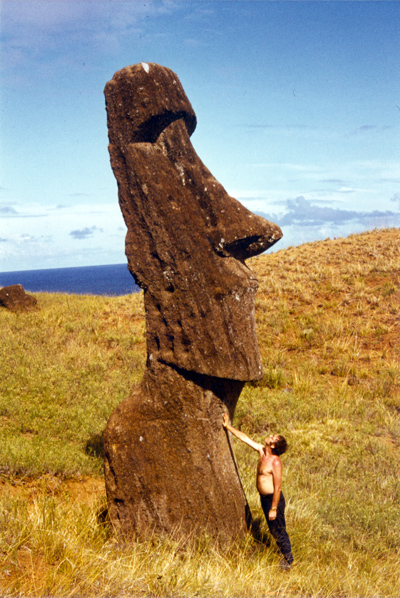
Kempeneers on Easter Island in 1978

As a teacher, he published mostly didactic works, such as guides to correct Dutch, books about Dutch spelling and Dutch grammar. In 1970 he wrote a science fiction novel for children, named "Phantoms from space".

In 1982, he was promoted to doctor in the philology of Germanic languages, with an essay on the hydronymy of the rivers Dijle and Nete. He became the principal of a school for adult education in 1984.

From the second half of the seventies on, he mainly wrote books and publications about the history of the municipality Tienen. During the 90s, he also covered the history of surrounding cities in the province of Flemish Brabant, such as Landen, Zoutleeuw, and parts of Linter.

Kempeneers died on 20 August 2025, at the age of 89.

== Publications ==
School publications (didactic works concerning Dutch)

- Tijd voor taal
- Tips voor taalzuivering
- ABN-gids
- Elementaire begrippen uit de Nederlandse taalkunde
- Didactiek van het Nederlands
- Spelen met spelling
- Nederlandse Spraakkunst en Oefeningen
- ABN-tips

Series Toponymica, K.U.Leuven (historical books)

- Hakendover IX, 5
- Kumtich IX, 6
- Oplinter IX, 7
- Waanrode IX, 8
- Goetsenhoven IX, 9
- Oorbeek IX, 10
- Orsmaal-Gussenhoven en Melkwezer IX, 11
- Naamkunde, register 1969-1993

Series Nomina geographica flandrica, K.U.Leuven (historical books)

- Hoegaardse Plaatsnamen, XV
- Leven in Landen, XVII
- Zoutleeuw, XIX

Royal Commission for Toponymy and Dialectology, Brussels (historical books)

- Toponymie van Orsmaal-Gussenhoven & Melkwezer
- Toponymie van Budingen
- Toponymie van Helen-Bos
- Toponymie van Vissenaken

Works of the Hagelands Historisch Documentatiecentrum (historical books)

- Cijnsboek van de hertog van Brabant in Tienen vernieuwd in 1699
- Klapper op het bevolkingsregister (1866–1890)
- Het oudste cijnsboek van Tienen (+ kroniekje G. Cluckers)

Other publications (various, mainly historical books and books about dialects)

- Hydronymie van het Dijle- en Netebekken
- Schimmen uit de ruimte
- Tienen in Verbeelding
- Oost-Brabantse Historische Teksten
- Esperanto voor moderne mensen
- Paaseiland
- De Brabantse Folklore register 1961-1996
- Aren lezen aan de Gete
- Diverse notabele dingen
- Pito, roman van een school
- Reddelen onder de boompjes
- Tienen in vroeger tijden
- Tiense Plaatsnamen
- Thuis in Thienen
- Tiens en Hoegaards Idioticon
- Toponymie van Sint-Margriet Houtem

Appears in 2007

- Oud Schrift. Lezen, begrijpen, overzetten
