= 2025 Belgian general strike =

3-day labor strike against austerity

- Date: November 24–26, 2025
- Location: Belgium
- Caused by: Austerity plan
- Methods: Labor strike
- Result: Unsuccessful

The 2025 Belgian general strike was a nationwide labor strike which took place over 3 days across Belgium. It was in protest of an austerity plan introduced by Prime Minister Bart De Wever, which included a pension reform and funding cuts to healthcare and unemployment benefits in an attempt to decrease Belgium's national debt, which was around 105% of GDP at the time. Rather than having multiple sectors strike at once, it was slowly built up over the course of the three days.

== Timeline of events ==
Bart De Wever was inaugurated as Prime Minister of Belgium on February 3rd, 2025, with one of his goals being to balance the budget. The main plan to do this was to cut public spending by £9.2 Billion by 2029. The methods to do this were, among other things, a wage freeze and reduced healthcare spending. Taxes were also raised, but only for lower tax brackets, leaving higher brackets unaffected, causing controversy from trade unions representing the working class. A series of strikes were held in protest of Wever's policies, numbering 13 major strike actions before Belgian unions called for a 3-day general strike.

On November 23rd, less than a day before the strike was set to begin, the Wever coalition, consisting of members from the Flemish nationalist New Flemish Alliance, the center-left Vooruit, the centrist Christian Democratic and Flemish, and the liberal Reformist Movement, struck a budget deal for the next few years, which contained the planned spending cuts as well as tax hikes in various sectors.

The general strike took place over three days, from the 24th to the 26th of November, with more sectors striking each day. On the 24th, transportation workers struck, causing widespread public transportation interruptions and multiple Eurostar cancellations. The National Railway Company of Belgium only ran every other train, with some lines running at a third of normal service levels.

On the 25th, the public sector joined the strike, causing a large-scale shutdown of public services, schools, and hospitals (with exceptions for emergency care). On the 26th, the final day of the strike, all sectors struck, with air travel being heavily affected. All departures and 110 arrivals were cancelled at Brussels Airport.

Following the strike, unions blocked further actions against the government, claiming they were "satisfied" with the strike. Despite the strike's widespread impact, multiple budget cuts were still carried out.
