= Paul Pataer =

Belgian politician (1938–2025)

Member of the Senate of Belgium
- In office 27 October 1992 – 12 April 1995
- In office 1985–1991

Personal details
- Born: 26 November 1938; Ghent, Belgium
- Died: 13 February 2025 (aged 86); Ghent, Belgium
- Political party: SP
- Occupation: Lawyer, politician

Paul Pataer (26 November 1938 – 13 February 2025) was a Belgian politician and lawyer who was a member of the Socialist Party, and served in the Senate from 1985 to 1991 and again from 27 October 1992 to 12 April 1995.

Pataer died in Ghent on 13 February 2025, at the age of 86.
