= Richard Olivier =

Belgian filmmaker (1945–2021)

- Born: 9 August 1945; Brussels, Belgium
- Died: 3 March 2021 (aged 75)
- Occupations: Filmmaker; Documentarian

Richard Olivier (9 August 1945 – 3 March 2021) was a Belgian filmmaker and documentarian. Internationally, he is best known for his 1981 documentary about soul singer Marvin Gaye's stay in Ostend, Belgium, titled Marvin Gaye Transit Ostende. In 2012, Olivier released an expanded version of this documentary.

He was also active as a playwright, writing the satirical play Big Daddy Dada (1978) about Idi Amin, which comic artist Jean-Louis Lejeune adapted into a comic strip.

== Filmography ==
=== Short films ===
- I’m Fed Up with Bananas (1970)
- Sheep as Far as You Can See (1971)
- The Tapdancer (1973)
- Phantasma (1975)
- Violent Mass (1975)
- The Motor Cyclist of the Apocalypse (1977)
- Plato (1980)
- Marvin Gaye Transit Ostende (1981)
- The End (1982)
- The Fantastic Goal-Scorer (1983)
- Splendour and Decadence of a Department Store (1985)
- Black, Yellow and Red (1990)
- Heavy Harted (1998)
- The Convicted Judge (1999)
- The Solitary of the Ventoux Mountain (2003)

=== Full-length films ===
- The Charm of Ambiguity (1974)
- The Apprentice Idols (1978)
- Strip School (1980)
- Black Paris (1981)
- Rebel Songs (1984)
- Kitsch Belgium (1990)
- Love Songs (1991)
- Wilchar, Black Tears (1992)
- The King's Fools (1993)
- Women Chants (1993)
- Marchienne, or Where to Live a Dot's Live (1995)
- Dutroux Dead-Holes (1996)
- A Summer in Droixhe
- Skin Sorrow (1997)
- Love Pains (1999)
- What Women Told Me (2002)
- Remember Marvin Gaye
- Dialogues with the Hereafter (2003)
- Ordinary Murders of Little Importance (2004)
- The Misfits of Faith (2006)
- Esther Forever (2007)
