= Guido Convents =

Belgian historian (1956–2025)

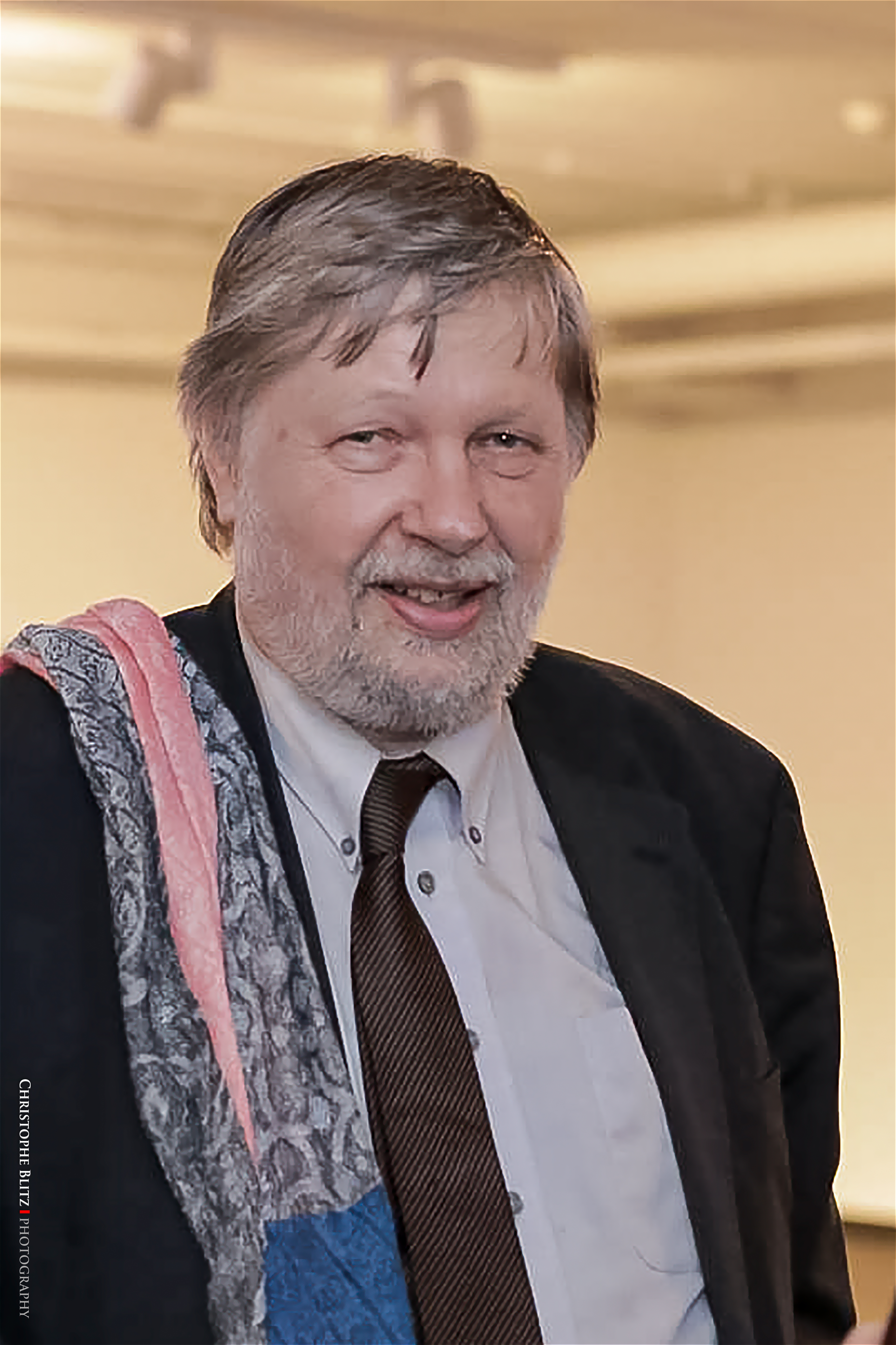
- Born: 10 May 1956
- Died: 10 September 2025 (aged 69)
- Education: KU Leuven; University of Lisbon
- Occupation: Historian

Guido Convents (10 May 1956 – 10 September 2025) was a Belgian historian.

Convents specialised in Western and African cinema within Africa, Catholic cinema and fairs, and the politics of the Belgian Congo during the German occupation in World War I.

Convents died on 10 September 2025, at the age of 69.
