= Kamiel Dierckx =

Belgian basketball player (1942–2026)

Kamiel Dierckx (2 January 1942 – 4 January 2026) was a Belgian basketball player.

== Life and career ==
Dierckx was born in Antwerp on 2 January 1942. During the 1960s and 1970s, he played as a guard for a number of teams, including Liège-Perron, Racing White, Royal IV and Destelbergen.

He participated with the Belgian Lions national team at the 1967 European Championship in Finland. There he averaged 12 points per game. Against the then Yugoslavia, he made 22 points.

Dierckx died on 4 January 2026, at the age of 84.
