= Belgium–Israel relations =

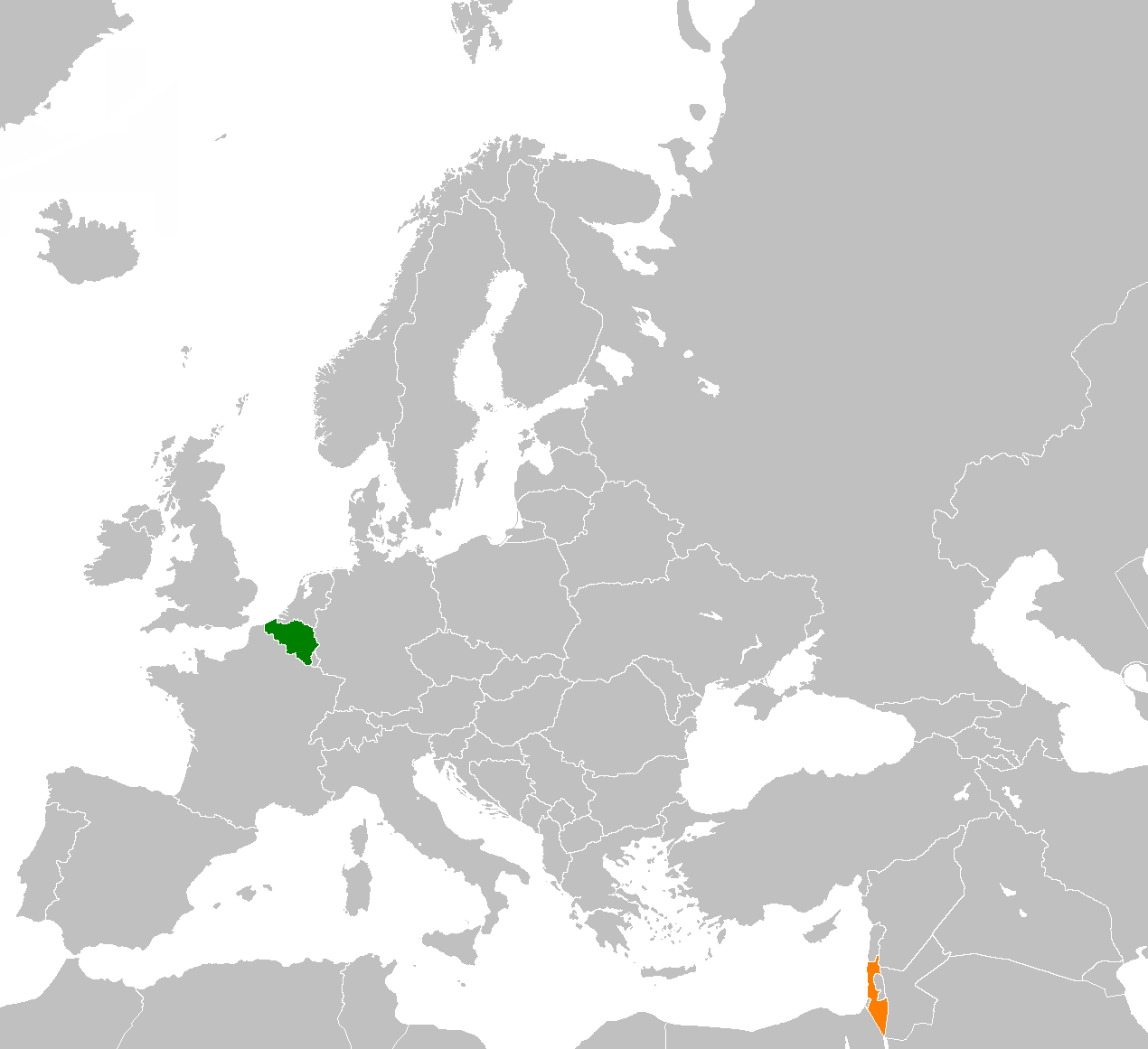
- Belgium: Israel

Belgium–Israel relations are the bilateral relations between Belgium and Israel. Belgium voted in favor of the United Nations Partition Plan for Palestine in 1947 and recognized the State of Israel on January 15, 1950. Belgium has an embassy in Tel Aviv, and Israel has an embassy in Brussels.

In February 2010, a plaque honoring King Albert I, husband of Elizabeth of Bavaria, was unveiled at Albert Square in Tel Aviv in the presence of the Tel Aviv mayor Ron Huldai and Ambassador Bénédicte Frankinet.

== State visits ==
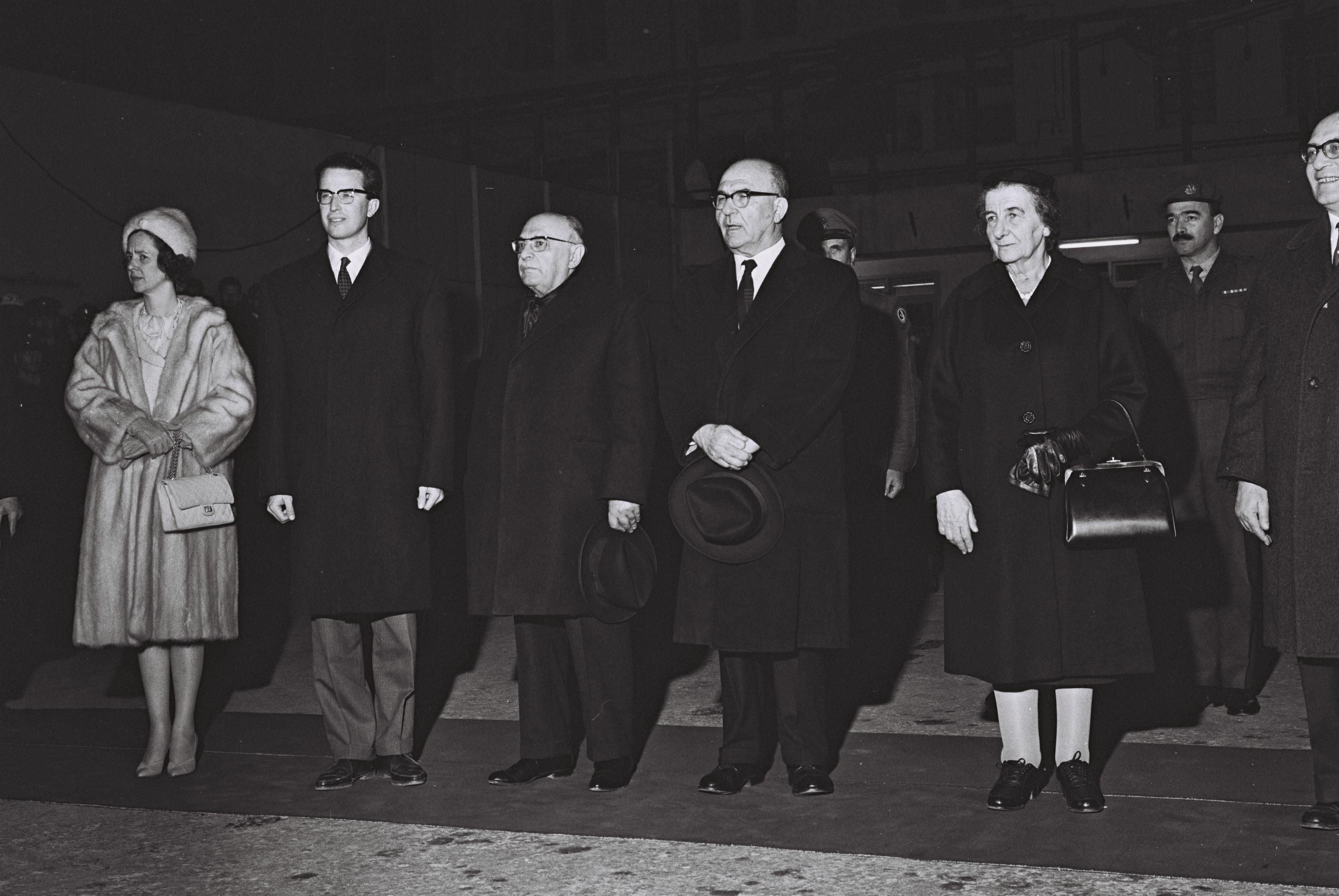
King Baudouin's visit to Israel 1964

King Albert visited Tel Aviv (then part of Mandatory Palestine) in 1933 and was hosted by Meir Dizengoff.

King Baudouin and Queen Fabiola visited Israel in 1964.

== History ==
In 1975, Belgium voted against the UN resolution equating Zionism with racism. It helped Israel establish informal ties with Tunisia and join the Western European and Others Group at the United Nations. Many cultural, scientific and economic bilateral agreements have been signed, and a number of Belgium-Israel friendship associations have been established. The faculty club and guesthouse of Hebrew University of Jerusalem, known as Beit Belgia, was built with the financial aid of the Belgian Friends of the Hebrew University.

In 2009, Israeli exports to Belgium reached $2.37 billion, while imports from Belgium totalled $2.56 billion. In 2010, trade increased by approximately 50%.

In March 2010, Israel and Belgium signed a new tax treaty agreement to improve the competitiveness of Israeli companies operating in Belgium and encourage Belgian investment in Israel.

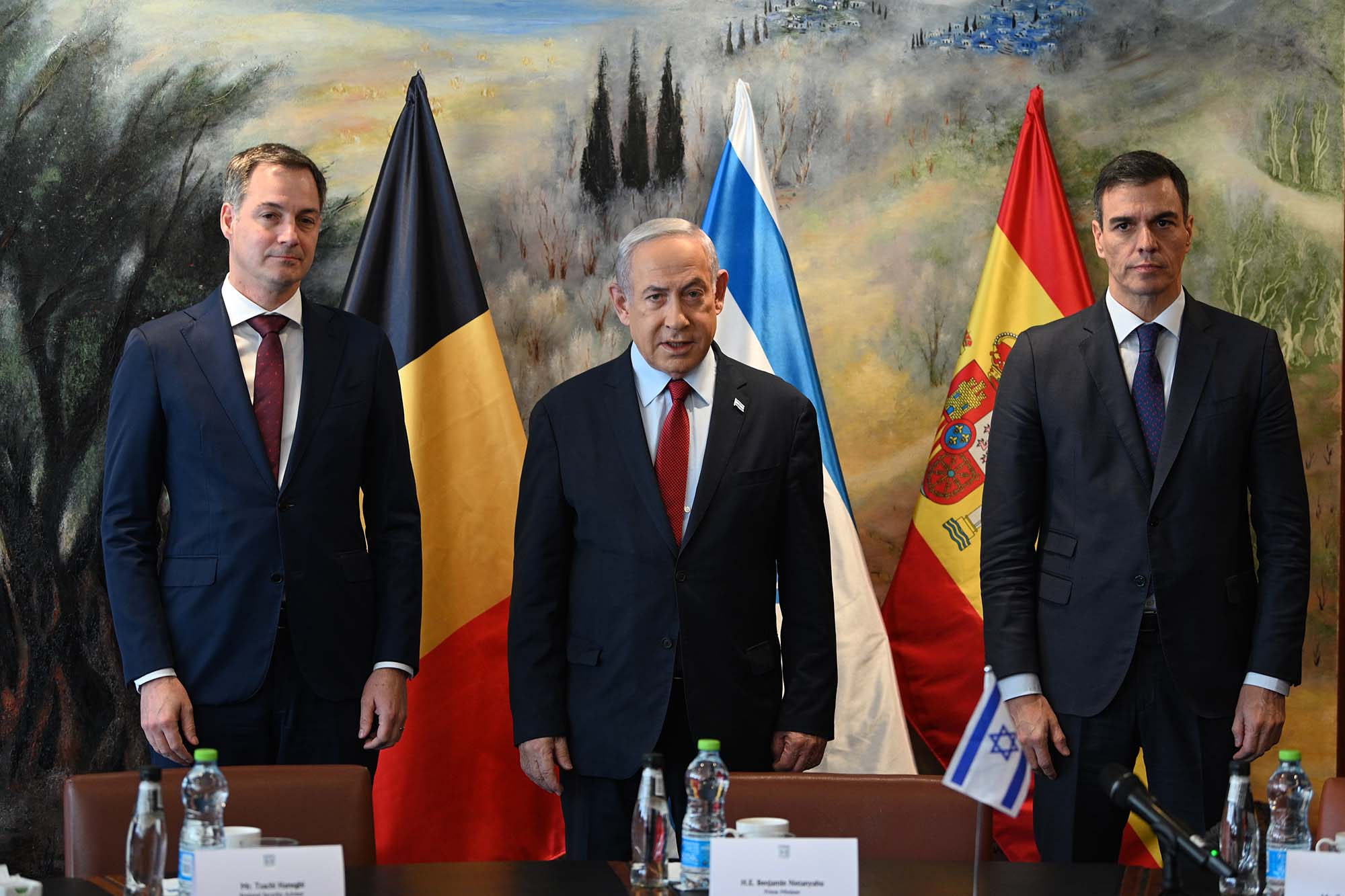
Belgian Prime Minister Alexander De Croo with Spanish Prime Minister Pedro Sánchez and Israeli Prime Minister Benjamin Netanyahu during the official visit in November 2023.

In October 2023, during the Gaza war, Belgian Prime Minister Alexander De Croo strongly condemned the atrocities committed by Hamas, and supported Israel's right to defend itself, but later deemed the destruction of Gaza "unacceptable", and called on Israel to respect international humanitarian law during its military operations. Following a meeting with Egyptian President Abdel Fattah el-Sisi in November, De Croo held a joint press conference at the Rafah border crossing along with Spanish Prime Minister Pedro Sánchez. During the conference, both European leaders said in a joint statement that the "indiscriminate killings of innocent civilians" in Gaza are "completely unacceptable." In a joint statement, they emphasized that the time had come for the international community and the European Union (EU) to once and for all recognize a Palestinian State and called for a permanent ceasefire in the war-battered territory. Israel lashed out at the two prime ministers "for not placing full responsibility for the crimes against humanity committed by Hamas, who massacred our citizens and used the Palestinians as human shields." Israeli Foreign Minister Eli Cohen instructed the countries' ambassadors to be summoned for a sharp reprimand, saying "We condemn the false claims of the prime ministers of Spain and Belgium who give support to terrorism." Belgium, along with Spain, Canada, the Netherlands and Japan, have all announced that they will stop sending weapons to Israel.

== Recent disputes ==
In September 2025, Belgium recognised a Palestinian state at the United Nations General Assembly as part of a broader diplomatic initiative alongside France, Britain, Canada, and Australia, framed as support for a two-state solution following the conflict in Gaza. Belgium also imposed sanctions on Israel, including restrictions on imports from settlements and other measures viewed as pressure on Israeli policies regarding the occupied Palestinian territories. Israel reacted strongly to the announcement, with Prime Minister Netanyahu calling Belgian Prime Minister Bart De Wever "a weak leader" for the decision and arguing that recognition of a Palestinian state would reward terrorism.

In February 2026, Belgium summoned U.S. Ambassador Bill White after he had used social media to accuse Belgian authorities of antisemitism in connection with an investigation into the alleged performance of ritual circumcisions by Jewish religious figures in Antwerp. Belgian Foreign Minister Maxime Prévot condemned the accusations as disinformation and inappropriate interference in judicial affairs, underlining that Belgian law permitted ritual circumcision when performed by qualified professionals and reaffirming the country’s commitment to combating antisemitism; in response, Israel publicly criticised Belgium’s handling of antisemitism in the wake of the dispute.

== Trade ==
Israel and Belgium trade is also influenced by the EU - Israel Free Trade Agreement from 1995.

Belgium - Israel trade in millions USD-$
| | Israel imports Belgium exports | Belgium imports Israel exports | Total trade value |
|---|---|---|---|
| 2023 | 3857.3 | 1594.3 | 5451.6 |
| 2022 | 4543.4 | 1996.9 | 6540.3 |
| 2021 | 4621.4 | 1974.7 | 6596.1 |
| 2020 | 3426.7 | 1458.3 | 4885 |
| 2019 | 3596.5 | 1636.9 | 5233.4 |
| 2018 | 3823.2 | 2193.5 | 6016.7 |
| 2017 | 4098.9 | 2704.8 | 6803.7 |
| 2016 | 3913.9 | 2507.3 | 6421.2 |
| 2015 | 3275 | 2487 | 5762 |
| 2014 | 3818.4 | 3299.6 | 7118 |
| 2013 | 3823.4 | 3118.3 | 6941.7 |
| 2012 | 3544.9 | 2929.1 | 6474 |
| 2011 | 4465 | 3767.5 | 8232.5 |
| 2010 | 3576.4 | 3116.8 | 6693.2 |
| 2009 | 2567.8 | 2371.8 | 4939.6 |
| 2008 | 4250.3 | 4618.7 | 8869 |
| 2007 | 4454.9 | 4070.8 | 8525.7 |
| 2006 | 3936.9 | 3068.4 | 7005.3 |
| 2005 | 4557.7 | 3679.5 | 8237.2 |
| 2004 | 4130.8 | 2898.1 | 7028.9 |
| 2003 | 3179.9 | 2320.9 | 5500.8 |
| 2002 | 3028.3 | 1863.2 | 4891.5 |

== Resident diplomatic missions ==
- Belgium has an embassy in Tel Aviv.
- Israel has an embassy in Brussels.

== See also ==
- Foreign relations of Belgium
- Foreign relations of Israel
- Belgium–Palestine relations
- Diamond industry in Israel
- Israeli–Palestinian conflict
- History of the Jews in Belgium
