= Josse Goffin =

Belgian artist and graphic novelist (1938–2024)

- Goffin in 2013
- Born: 2 November 1938; Brussels, Belgium
- Died: 9 July 2024 (aged 85); Ixelles, Belgium
- Education: La Cambre
- Occupations: Artist; graphic novellist

Josse Goffin (2 November 1938 – 9 July 2024) was a Belgian artist and graphic novelist.

== Biography ==
Born in Brussels on 2 November 1938, Goffin read The Adventures of Tintin, Spirou, and Zig et Puce in his youth. He was an admirer of Maurice Sendak and Tomi Ungerer, the Babar the Elephant series, and Saul Steinberg. He studied drawing and graphic design at La Cambre. He then worked in Maurice Rosy's office and for the publisher Dupuis. He then worked for several publishing houses in Paris before returning to Brussels in 1962, becoming an independent comic books author. He then created several book covers and magazine covers, including for Spirou. He also created album covers for Julos Beaucarne and television credits.

In addition to his artistic career, Goffin taught at La Cambre from 1977/1979 to 2004. He won the Grand Prize for Graphic Design at the Bologna Children's Book Fair in 1992 for his book Oh !. He spent most of his career working in his office in Ixelles, reflected in his 2010 retrospective Josse Goffin / Inventaire, published by Éditions Racine.

Goffin died in Ixelles on 9 July 2024, at the age of 85.

== Works ==
=== Children's books ===
==== Author and illustrator ====
- Oh ! (1991)
- Ah ! (1991)
- Petit Poisson (2003)

==== Illustrator ====
- Grand-mère Sucre, grand-père Chocolat (text by Gigi Bigot, 2001)
- Drôle de doudou ! (text by Evelyne Reberg, 2002)
- L'Imagier malin (text by Marie-Agnès Gaudrat-Pourcel, 2016)

=== Comic book series ===
- Contes de Noël du journal Spirou 1955-1969 (2020)

=== Expositions ===
- Le Monde de Josse Goffin (2023)
