= Eric De Rop =

Belgian comic book artist (1954–2025)

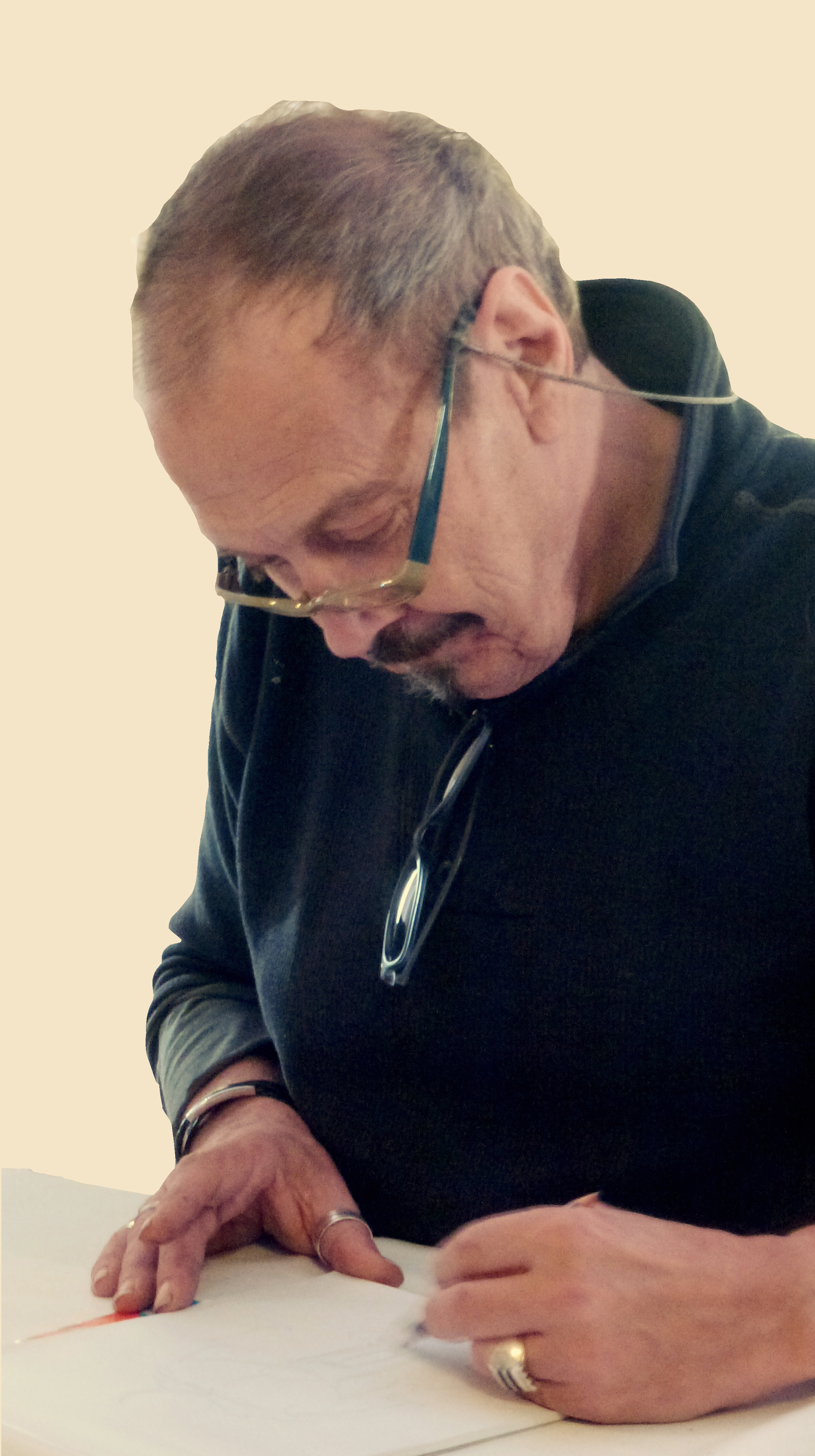
- De Rop in 2016
- Born: 14 April 1954; Wilrijk, Belgium
- Died: 1 October 2025 (aged 71)
- Occupation: Comic book artist

Eric De Rop (14 April 1954 – 1 October 2025) was a Belgian comic book artist. He designed comics for the Studio Vandersteen for 43 years.

== Life and career ==
Born in Wilrijk on 14 April 1954, De Rop was the son of fellow comic book artist Eduard De Rop. The first series he worked on were Bessy and Jérôme. His contributions were later published in 2022 by BD Must. In 1984, he began working on the series Spike and Suzy, which he continued to contribute to until 2015. He was also active as a political cartoonist for 't Pallieterke. His son became a famous graffiti artist under the name Bué le Guerrier.

De Rop died on 1 October 2025, at the age of 71.

== Works ==
=== L'Énigme verte ===
- L'Énigme verte (1985)

=== Albert & C ===
- Albert & C (2008)

=== Les Gueux ===
- Les Sept Chasseurs (2022)
- La Pie sur la potence (2022)
- Baguette, la sorcière (2022)

=== Collective works ===
- Carte blanche (2016)
