= Gerhard Palm =

Belgian politician (1946–2025)

Member of the Parliament of the German-speaking Community
- In office 1974–2010

Personal details
- Born: 1 December 1946 Büllingen, Belgium
- Died: 23 August 2025 (aged 78)
- Political party: PDB; ProDG
- Education: University of Liège
- Occupation: Schoolteacher

Gerhard Palm (1 December 1946 – 23 August 2025) was a Belgian politician of the Party of German-speaking Belgians (PDB) and ProDG.

Palm was a member of the Parliament of the German-speaking Community from 1974 to 2010.

Palm died on 23 August 2025, at the age of 78.
