= Jean-Claude Bernardet =

Belgian-born Brazilian writer (1936–2025)

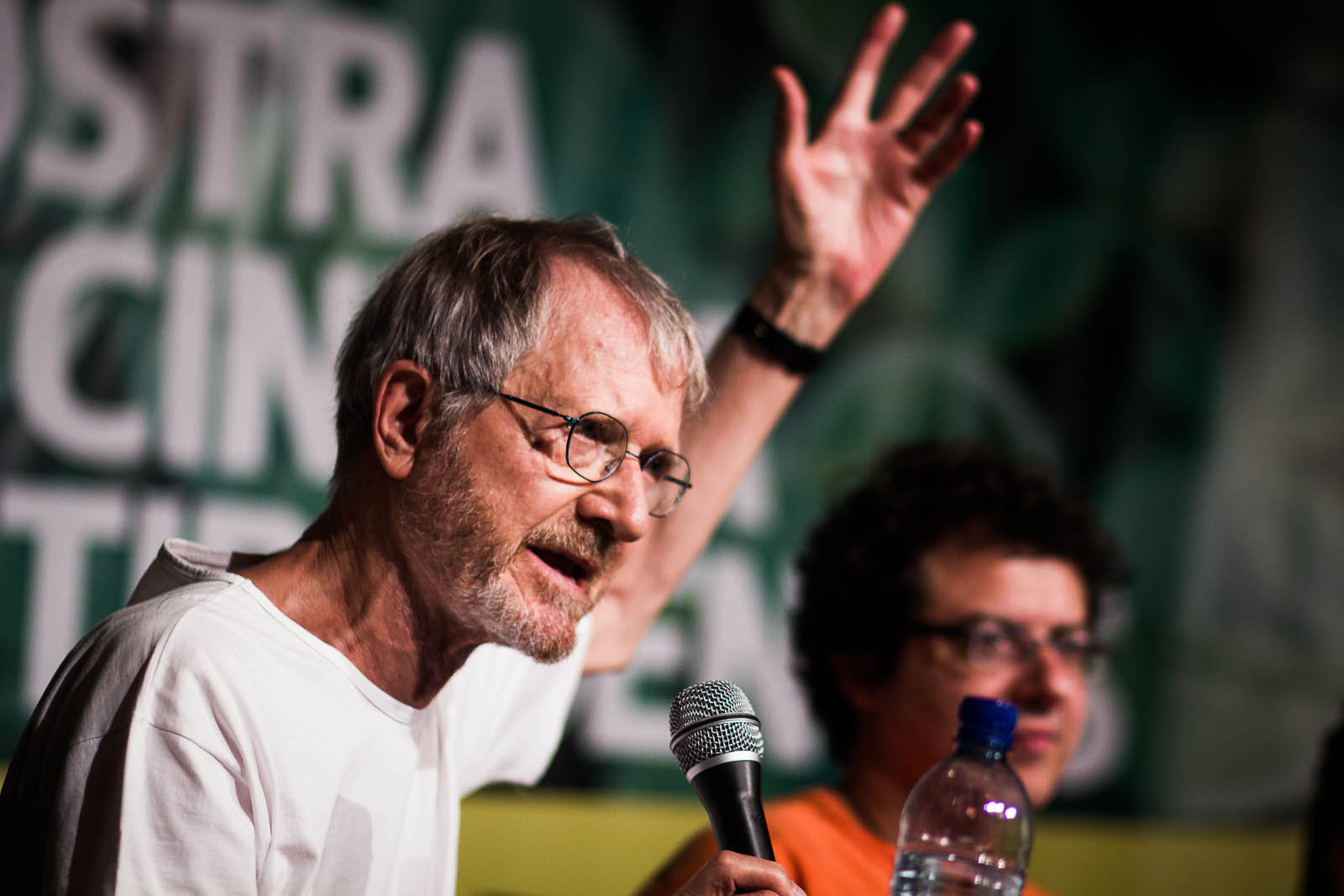
Bernadet in 2013

Jean-Claude Bernardet OMC (French: [ʒɑ̃klod bɛʁnaʁdɛ]; August 2, 1936 – July 12, 2025) was a Belgian-born Brazilian film theorist, film critic, film director, actor, screenwriter and writer.

== Life and career ==
Bernardet was born August 2, 1936 in Belgium, to a French family, he spent his childhood in Paris, and came to Brazil with his family at the age of 13, becoming a naturalized Brazilian citizen in 1964. He held a degree from the École des Hautes Études en Sciences Sociales, and a PhD in Arts from the ECA (School of Communications and Arts) at University of São Paulo.

He became interested in cinema from the film club, and began to write reviews in the newspaper O Estado de S. Paulo at the invitation of Paulo Emílio Salles Gomes. He became a great interlocutor of the group of filmmakers of Cinema Novo, and especially of Glauber Rocha, who broke with him after the publication of Brasil em Tempo de Cinema (1967). He was one of the creators of the film course at University of Brasilia, in Brasília, and taught History of Brazilian Cinema at ECA, until he retired in 2004.

In addition to his importance as a theorist, he was also a fictionist, with four published volumes. He participated in several films, as a screenwriter and assistant director, eventually as an actor in small roles. In the 1990s, he directed two medium-length poetic essays: São Paulo, Sinfonia e Cacofonia (1994) and Sobre Anos 60 (1999).

In 2007 he was awarded the Order of Cultural Merit.

He was also the inventor of the children's toy Combina-cor, launched by Grow.

Bernardet died at the Samaritano Hospital in São Paulo, on July 12, 2025, at the age of 88.
