= Buggenhout train collision =

Railway accident near Buggenhout, Belgium

Details
- Date: 26 May 2026; 8:08 (CEST)
- Location: Buggenhout, Belgium
- Coordinates: 51.01695°N 4.19110°E
- Country: Belgium
- Operator: SNCB and 't Ros Beiaard
- Cause: Collision on a level crossing between a train and a bus

Statistics
- Bus: 1
- Trains: 1
- Passengers: Minibus: 9
- Deaths: 4 (Minibus)
- Injured: 5 (Minibus)

A collision between an SNCB train and a minibus from 't Ros Beiaard occurred in Buggenhout, Belgium, at a level crossing on 26 May 2026. The bus was carrying nine individuals: the driver, a school escort, and seven students. The bus was driving to Richtpunt Campus in Buggenhout. The collision resulted in the deaths of four individuals and seriously injured five individuals on the minibus. The driver, age 49, and the escort, aged 27, were killed as well as two of the students (aged 12 and 15). The five other students were taken to hospital with serious injuries.

The barriers at the level crossing were lowered, and the red light was on at the time of the collision. The train was in the process of slowing down to stop at Buggenhout station, the driver of the train applied the emergency brake in anticipation of the collision. However, the train was still going approximately 90 kilometres per hour (56 mph) at the point of collision.

== Responses ==
On the day of the collision, the King of Belgium, Philippe, offered his condolences to the families of the victims, and communicated with the governor of East Flanders, Carina Van Cauter, praising the prompt action of the emergency services.

The prime minister of Belgium, Bart De Wever, expressed his condolences and sadness about the event on X, shortly after the collision. President of the European Commission, Ursula von der Leyen, said in a statement that "Europe cries with Belgium."
