= Magda De Galan =

Belgian politician (1946–2024)

- Born: 23 September 1946; Saint-Gilles, Belgium
- Died: 17 September 2024 (aged 77)
- Occupation: Ppolitician

Magdalena C. A. M. De Galan (23 September 1946 – 17 September 2024) was a Belgian politician from the Socialist Party.

== Life and career ==
De Galan was born in Saint-Gilles on 23 September 1946. She was mayor in Forest and a member of Brussels Parliament. De Galan died on 17 September 2024, at the age of 77.

== Positions held ==
- Minister of Health and Social Affairs for the government of the French Community (1992–1994)
- Minister for Social Affairs (1994–1999)
- Mayor in Forest (1999–2001 and 2007–2015)
