= Michel Van Roye =

Belgian politician (1951–2025)

Member of the Parliament of the Brussels-Capital Region
- In office 12 January 2001 – 13 June 2004
- Preceded by: Philippe Debry

Personal details
- Born: 16 September 1951
- Died: 18 July 2025 (aged 73)
- Political party: Ecolo

Michel Van Roye (16 September 1951 – 18 July 2025) was a Belgian politician of Ecolo.

Van Roye replaced Philippe Debry in the Parliament of the Brussels-Capital Region, serving from 2001 to 2004. He was also the first member of Ecolo to serve as an alderman in Brussels from 1988 to 2000.

Van Roye died on 18 July 2025, at the age of 73.
