= Jean-Marie Séverin =

Belgian politician (1941–2025)

Member of the Chamber of Representatives of Belgium
- In office 1992–1995

Member of the Parliament of Wallonia
- In office 21 May 1995 – 12 July 1999
- In office 17 October 2000 – 7 June 2009

Personal details
- Born: 8 April 1941; Namur, German-occupied Belgium
- Died: 7 September 2025 (aged 84); Namur, Belgium
- Political party: MR
- Education: University of Liège
- Occupation: Industrialist

Jean-Marie Séverin (8 April 1941 – 7 September 2025) was a Belgian politician of the Reformist Movement (MR).

Séverin served in the Chamber of Representatives from 1992 to 1995 and was a member of the Parliament of Wallonia from 1995 to 1999 and again from 2000 to 2009.

Séverin died in Namur on 7 September 2025, at the age of 84.
