= Simonne Creyf =

Belgian politician (1946–2025)

Member of the Chamber of Representatives of Belgium
- In office 21 May 1995 – 2 May 2007

Member of the Flemish Council
- In office 7 January 1992 – 20 May 1995

Member of the Senate of Belgium
- In office 24 November 1991 – 20 May 1995

Member of the Parliament of the Brussels-Capital Region
- In office 12 July 1989 – 20 May 1995

Personal details
- Born: 24 May 1946 Bruges, Belgium
- Died: 8 March 2025 (aged 78) Kessel-Lo, Belgium
- Party: CD&V
- Occupation: Researcher

Simonne Creyf (24 May 1946 – 8 March 2025) was a Belgian politician of Christian Democratic and Flemish (CD&V).

== Life and career ==
A researcher by profession, Creyf served in numerous political positions. She was a member of the Parliament of the Brussels-Capital Region from 1989 to 1995, a Senator from 1991 to 1995, a member of the Flemish Council from 1992 to 1995, and a member of the Chamber of Representatives from 1995 to 2007.

== Death ==
Creyf died in Kessel-Lo on 8 March 2025, at the age of 78.
