= José Brouwers =

Belgian stage director and actor (1931–2025)

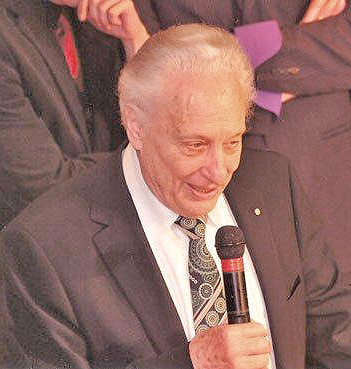
- Brouwers in 2011
- Born: 26 March 1931; Herve, Belgium
- Died: 3 January 2025 (aged 93)
- Education: Royal Conservatory of Liège
- Occupation(s): Stage director Actor

José Brouwers (26 March 1931 – 3 January 2025) was a Belgian stage director and actor.

For 73 years, he animated the cultural life of Liège. He served as deputy director of the Théâtre de Liège and founded the Théâtre Arlequin.

Brouwers died on 3 January 2025, at the age of 93.

== Distinctions ==
- Officer of the Ordre des Arts et des Lettres (2000)
- Prix Tchanchès (2006)
- Honorary citizen of Liège (2010)
