= Michel Schetter =

Belgian comic book author (1948–2025)

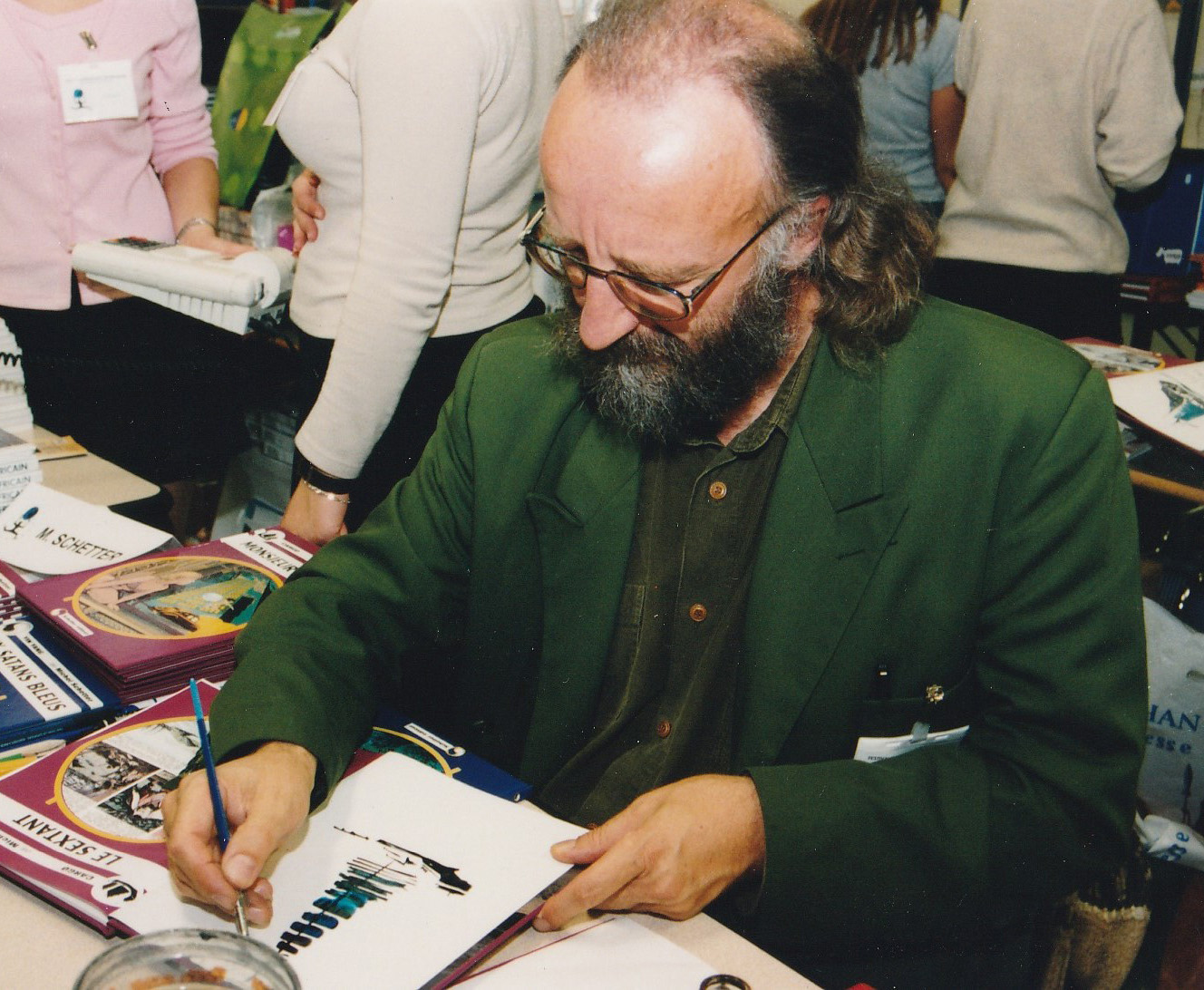
- Schetter in 1999
- Born: 26 September 1948; La Louvière, Belgium
- Died: 10 January 2025 (aged 76); Saint-Cast-le-Guildo, France
- Occupation: Comic book author

Michel Schetter (26 September 1948 – 10 January 2025) was a Belgian comic book author. He also served as a writer for comics magazines. Schetter died on 10 January 2025, at the age of 76.

== Works ==
=== Comics as an author and editor ===
- Les Années de feu : 1933-1945 (1982)
- La Dernière Auberge (1982)
- Le Château d'Ichor (1984)
- Le Boulevard de Marilyn (1984)

==== Berlin series ====
- Les Plumes de l'argus (1985)
- Le Funambule (1987)

==== Cargo series ====
- L'Écume de Surabaya (1984)
- Le Coffre de Box-Calf (1984)
- Princesse de lune (1985)
- Le Mata-Hari (1987)

==== Independent albums ====
- Le Sextant (1988)
- Le Judas de Shanghaï (1989)
- Le Baron Do (1990)
- Monsieur Parker (1990)
- L'Octopus de Venise (2004)

==== Yin Yang collection ====
- Les Lettres de Pearl (1991)
- Le Galop de l'Hippocampe (1992)
- La Société du Sablier (1993)
- L'Huis de Marie (1994)
- Deux satans bleus (1996)
- Le Maître Ginkgo (1999)
- L'Héritage des Vénus (2002)

=== Comics as an author and artist ===
==== Yérushalaïm series ====
- Shoshik (1985)
- L'Hiver de Faust (1986)

=== Autobiography ===
- Sabre au clair (2005)
