= Marc Hollogne =

Belgian actor and director (1961–2025)

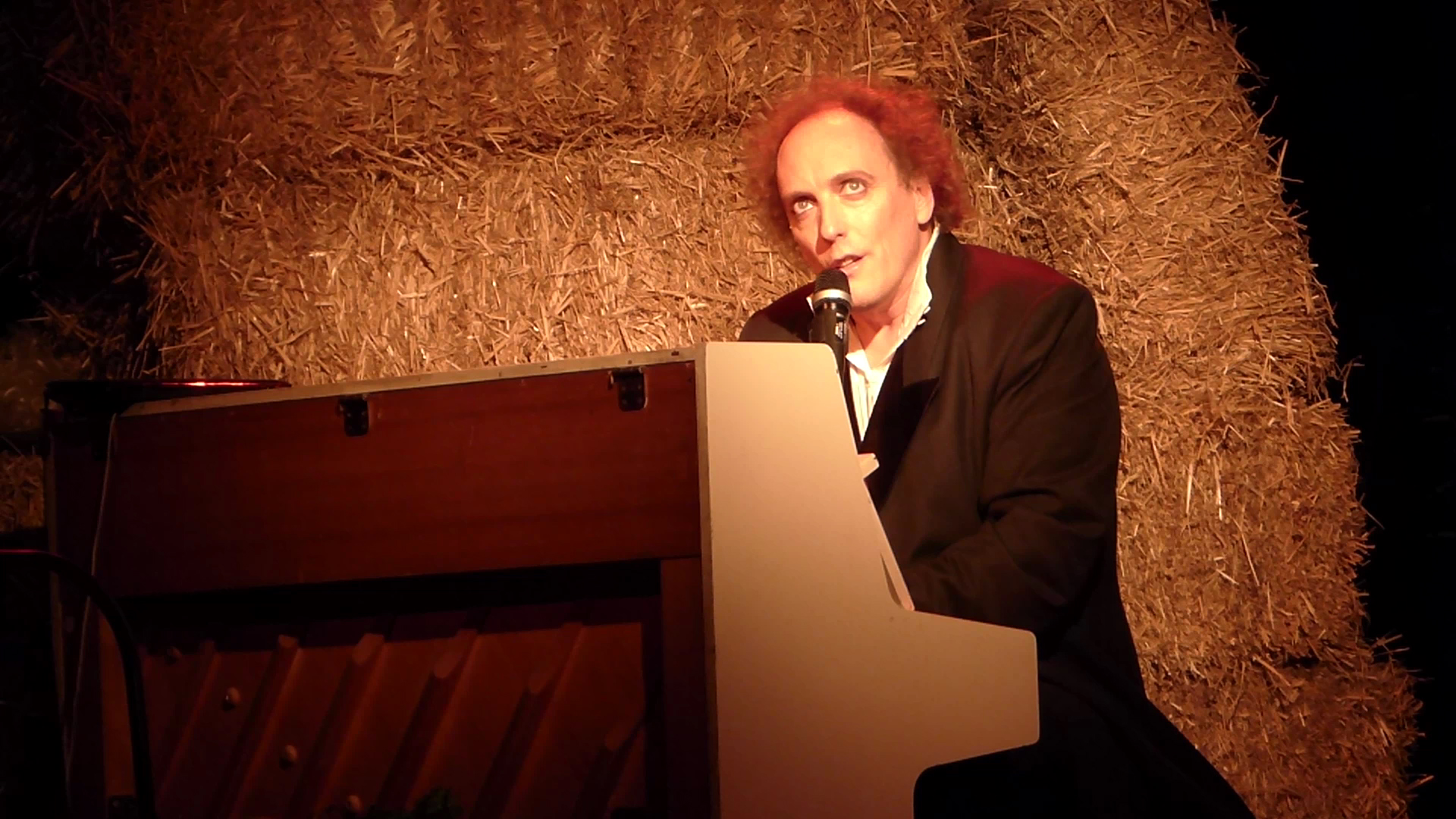
- Hollogne in 2014
- Born: 27 December 1961
- Died: 14 January 2025 (aged 63)
- Occupation(s): Actor; Film director Stage director

Marc Hollogne (27 December 1961 – 14 January 2025) was a Belgian actor, film director and stage director. He was well-known for "Cinema-Theater", which mixed elements of film, theatre, and music. Hollogne died on 14 January 2025, at the age of 63.

== Filmography ==
- Chance or Coincidence (1998)
- The Claim (2000)
