= Hugo Weckx =

Belgian politician (1935–2024)

Minister of Culture of Flanders
- In office 21 January 1992 – 20 June 1995
- Preceded by: Patrick Dewael
- Succeeded by: Luc Martens

Minister of Education of Flanders
- In office 3 February 1988 – 18 October 1988
- Preceded by: Theo Kelchtermans
- Succeeded by: Daniël Coens

Member of the Chamber of Representatives of Belgium
- In office 13 December 1987 – 20 May 1995
- In office 17 April 1977 – 7 November 1981

Member of the Senate of Belgium
- In office 8 November 1981 – 12 October 1985

Personal details
- Born: 9 January 1935 Vilvoorde, Belgium
- Died: 23 October 2024 (aged 89)
- Party: CD&V
- Education: KU Leuven
- Occupation: Lawyer

Hugo Weckx (9 January 1935 – 23 October 2024) was a Belgian lawyer and politician of Christian Democratic and Flemish (CD&V). He was an important figure in the Flemish Government in the 1980s and 90s, serving as Minister of Education and Minister of Culture. He was also a member of the Chamber of Representatives and the Senate. Weckx died on 23 October 2024, at the age of 89.

His archives are held in the Archief en Museum voor het Vlaams Leven te Brussel.
