= Lucien Cariat =

Belgian politician (1939–2025)

- Born: 17 October 1939
- Died: 7 January 2025 (aged 85)
- Occupation: Politician
- Political party: PS

Lucien Cariat (17 October 1939 – 7 January 2025) was a Belgian politician. A member of the Socialist Party, he served as president of the Centre de délassement de Marcinelle and was alderman of tourism and environment of Charleroi.

In 2006, Cariat was arrested and charged with mismanagement of the municipal waste collection system, which he had chaired for many years. He was later released and resumed his duties as president of Pro Cultura. In December 2009, he was referred to the Charleroi criminal court. On 9 October 2009, he was sentenced to a three-month suspended prison sentence for failure to pay non-wage labour costs. He was later found guilty of embezzlement, forgery, misuse of corporate assets, and illegal provision of personnel. On 29 June 2012, he was sentenced to a two-year suspended prison sentence, a fine of 11,000 euros, and the confiscation of 100,000 euros for the benefit of the Charleroi waste management system.

Cariat died on 7 January 2025, at the age of 85.
