= Johan Van den Driessche =

Belgian politician (1953–2025)

Member of the Parliament of the Brussels-Capital Region
- In office 11 June 2014 – 26 May 2019

Personal details
- Born: 16 June 1953 Berchem-Sainte-Agathe, Belgium
- Died: 1 February 2025 (aged 71) De Panne, Belgium
- Party: N-VA
- Education: Hogeschool-Universiteit Brussel
- Occupation: Businessman

Johan Van den Driessche (16 June 1953 – 1 February 2025) was a Belgian politician of the New Flemish Alliance (N-VA).

After studying commercial and fiscal sciences at the Hogeschool-Universiteit Brussel, he worked for KPMG and taught part-time at his alma mater. In 2014, he was elected to the Parliament of the Brussels-Capital Region.

Van den Driessche died in De Panne on 1 February 2025, at the age of 71.
