= 2026 Belgium wildfires =

- Date: August 2026

Statistics
- Status: Ongoing wildfire
- Perimeter: uncertain contained

Impacts
- Deaths: multiple
- Missing people: uncertain
- Evacuated: thousands
- Livestock lost: uncertain
- Structures destroyed: uncertain
- Cost: uncertain

Ignition
- Cause: multiple causes
- Motive: Under investigation

Map
- Perimeters of 2026 Belgium wildfire (map data)

In 2026, Belgium experienced its largest wildfire in recent history.

== Background ==
The wildfires occurred during the 2026 European heatwaves.

== History ==
The High Fens – Eifel Nature Park cover an area of more than 4,000 hectares, making it the largest nature reserve in Belgium. The vegetation consists mainly of heathland with forest, deep peatlands, protected peat deposits, and scattered deciduous forest. Many different and unique animals and plants live and grow here.

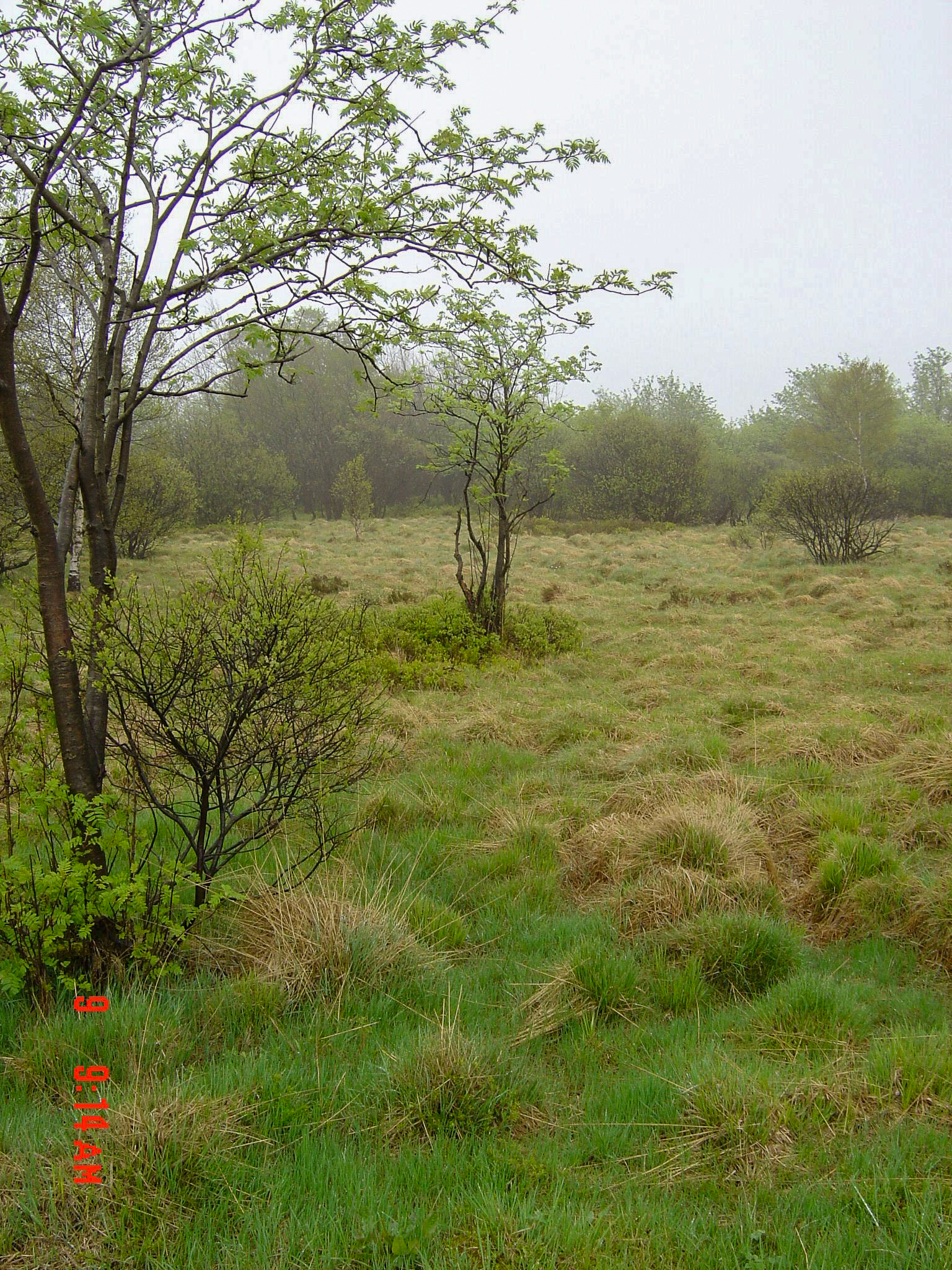
High Fens

In August 2026, a wildfire broke out described as the largest in Belgium's recent history. The wildfire ravaged about 3,000 hectares (7,400 acres) of the nature park. The wildfire caused widespread destruction according to acting governor of the province of Liège Anne Dassy. The wildfire persisted despite the rain and relatively cooler weather. Firefighting efforts are proceeding with great difficulty because the terrain is difficult to access and the fires are also spreading underground. Hundreds of people were evacuated. The region of the Belgium–Germany border was particularly affected.

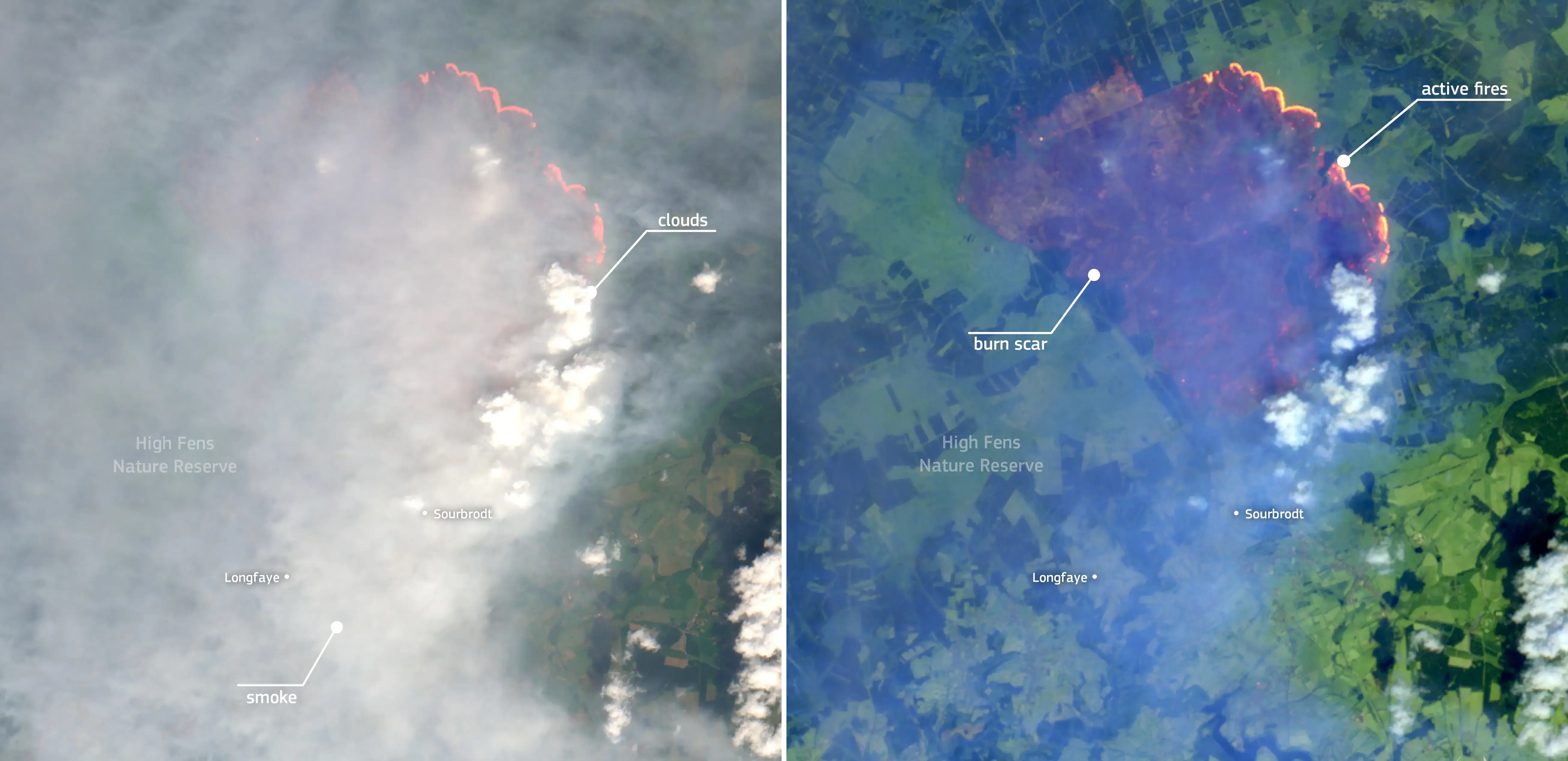
Wildfire in the High Fens nature reserve (Copernicus 2026-08-16)

== See also ==
- 2026 France wildfires
- 2026 Greece wildfires
- 2026 United Kingdom wildfires
