= Mark Schena =

American biochemist

- Born: Mark Alden Schena; May 21, 1963 (age 61); Buffalo, New York, U.S.
- Education: University of California at Berkeley (BA); University of California, San Francisco (PhD)

Mark Alden Schena (born May 21, 1963) is an American biochemist and president of a public life sciences health care company.

== Early life and education ==
Schena was born in Buffalo, New York. He received his B.A. in biochemistry from Daniel E. Koshland, Jr. at the University of California at Berkeley in 1984. Schena received his Ph.D. in biochemistry from the University of California, San Francisco (UCSF) in 1990. Schena studied as a postdoctoral fellow in the department of biochemistry at Stanford University from 1990 until 1999.

== Career ==
During his studies at Berkeley, Schena showed that changes in citrate synthase expression cause changes in flux through the citric acid cycle. This work showed the importance of rate limiting steps in enzymatic pathways. As a graduate student at UCSF, Schena discovered the evolutionary conservation of cellular mechanisms across eukaryotic evolution by demonstrating the conservation of mammalian glucocorticoid receptor function in the yeast Saccharomyces cerevisiae. At Stanford, Schena pioneered a new field of science (microarray technology) as the first author on the Stanford team publication in the journal Science demonstrating that complementary DNA molecules immobilized on glass could be used to measure gene expression in the flowering plant Arabidopsis thaliana. The modern microarray industry and solid-phase DNA sequencing industry have drawn heavily from the 1995 Science paper. More than 42,000 peer-reviewed microarray publications have appeared in the scientific literature since 1995. Mark Schena, and his company ArrayIt, were charged with securities fraud by the U.S. Justice Department for promoting an unproven technology to detect coronavirus in clinical samples.

Schena has written four books on microarrays, including the first textbook on the subject, and has been featured by journalists in interviews covered by the print media, radio and television. Schena has pioneered an extensive line of microarray products and services at Arrayit. Schena is the inventor of Variation Identification Platform (VIP) technology, which is capable of genotyping up to 80,000 patients in a single microarray test. Schena has taken an active role in healthcare reform in the United States by promoting the importance of technical innovation as a means of improving the quality and accessibility of healthcare and controlling its cost. Schena is considered the foremost authority on microarray technology, referred to as the "Father of Microarray Technology".

In 2001, Schena was featured on the Nova television documentary "Cracking the Code of Life", a two-hour special hosted by ABC News Nightline correspondent Robert Krulwich. Schena first introduced microarrays as pre-symptomatic diagnostic tools on the 2001 Nova program. Schena holds the first and second positions on "The Microarray Family Tree", a historiograph of 13 influential papers published in the microarray field, written by Eugene Garfield. The Scientist also credited Schena with creating the first array. Schena was proclaimed the "Father of Microarrays" in an article written by Lloyd Dunlap, contributing editor of Drug Discovery News, in an account of Schena's pioneering work to decipher Parkinson's disease. Schena and Rene Schena reside in Los Altos, California.

In June 2020 Schena was charged with securities fraud and conspiracy to commit health care fraud stemming from his involvement in a scheme to defraud investors. Schena used his position as president of Arrayit Corp. to bribe doctors and recruiters into making false claims regarding a test his company was purportedly developing for COVID-19. The scheme resulted in Arrayit's stock price more than doubling while Schena was promoting his fraudulent tests. U.S. Attorney David L. Anderson of the Northern District of California was quoted as saying “The scheme described in the complaint, in which the defendant allegedly leveraged this allure by appending the fear of the COVID-19 pandemic, amounts to a cynical multimillion-dollar hoax.” On September 1, 2022, Schena was convicted of nine federal charges, including conspiracy to commit wire and health care fraud and three counts of securities fraud.

On October 18, 2023, Schena was sentenced to 8 years in federal prison, and was ordered to pay 24 million dollars in restitution.
