= Philippe Waxweiler =

Belgian painter and sculptor (1943–2025)

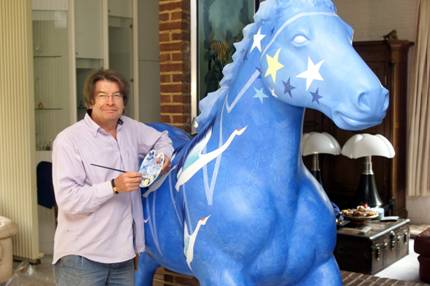
- Waxweiler in 2007
- Born: 15 December 1943; Liège, German-occupied Belgium
- Died: 29 August 2025 (aged 81)
- Occupations: Painter, sculptor

Philippe Waxweiler (15 December 1943 – 29 August 2025) was a Belgian painter and sculptor. He was best known for creating decoration sets for the Théâtre Arlequin, a theatre in Liège.

Waxweiler died on 29 August 2025, at the age of 81.
