= Luc Misson =

Belgian lawyer (1952–2025)

- Born: 24 December 1952; Vielsalm, Belgium
- Died: 7 August 2025 (aged 72)
- Occupation: Lawyer

Luc Misson (24 December 1952 – 7 August 2025) was a Belgian lawyer. He was notably counsel for Jean-Marc Bosman during the Bosman ruling in 1995.

== Life and career ==
Born in Vielsalm on 24 December 1952, Misson moved to Liège after studying law. Interested in European law, he often took up cases that challenged the legal framework of the European Union. He gained notoriety from the Bosman ruling in 1995, a case which transformed the world of European football. The ruling banned restrictions on foreign EU players within national leagues and allowed for the quick transfer of players between member states within the transfer fee requirement. His other cases included trade union laws, students' rights, and the rights of residents living near airports. He notably represented the labor union Syndicat autonome des conducteurs de train against the National Railway Company of Belgium.

Misson died on 7 August 2025, at the age of 72.
