= Dominiq Fournal =

Belgian artist and photographer (1956–2024)

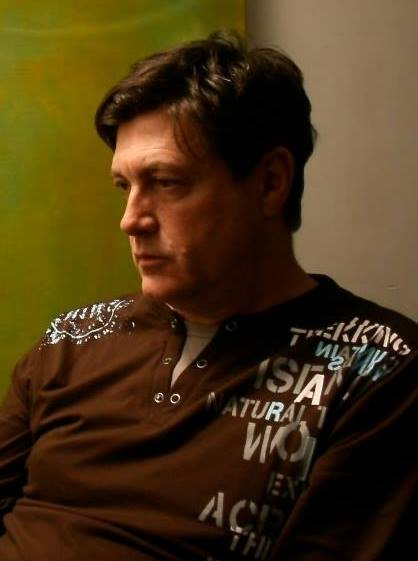
- Fournal in 2015
- Born: 27 January 1956; Boma, Belgian Congo
- Died: 13 October 2024 (aged 68)
- Education: Institut Saint-Luc
- Occupations: Artist; Photographer

Dominiq Fournal (27 January 1956 – 13 October 2024) was a Belgian plastic artist, painter, and photographer. His paintings achieved acclaim in Belgian media. Fournal died on 13 October 2024, at the age of 68.

== Awards ==
- Prix Gaston Bertrand (2018)
