= Annie Massay =

Belgian trade unionist (1931–2025)

- Born: Anne-Marie Deblinde; 18 May 1931; Liège, Belgium
- Died: 17 August 2025 (aged 94)
- Education: University of Liège
- Occupation: Trade unionist

Anne-Marie Massay (née Deblinde; 18 May 1931 – 17 August 2025) was a Belgian trade unionist. She was a permanent secretary of the General Labour Federation of Belgium and the Association of Employees, Technicians and Managers (SETca) and was an activist for women's rights, participating in the women's strike at FN Herstal from 16 February to 4 March 1966.

== Life and career ==
Born into a Catholic family in Liège on 18 May 1931, Massay turned to atheism after World War II and joined the Jeunes Gardes Socialistes at the age of 13. She graduated from the University of Liège with a degree in sociology and published a thesis titled "Femmes dans le monde des hommes". She joined the Association of Employees, Technicians and Managers in 1959. During the FN Herstal women's strike, she was an intermediary between the General Labour Federation of Belgium and the Confederation of Christian Trade Unions, the latter of which was exclusively male. During the strike, she spoke at meetings alongside Irène Pétry and Émilienne Brunfaut. From 1971 to 1995, she represented the SETca at the Grand Casino de Chaudfontaine, notably taking part in the strike and occupation of Le Grand Bazar in 1976. In 2015, she received the Prix de Theroigne de Mericourt, celebrating the Walloon women's rights activist. In 2016, she was named an honorary citizen of Liège.

Massay died on 17 August 2025, at the age of 94.
