= Marceau Mairesse =

Belgian politician (1945–2026)

Marceau Mairesse (18 January 1945 – 15 January 2026) was a Belgian politician.

== Life and career ==
Mairesse was born in Leval-Trahegnies on 18 January 1945. He was a member of the Christian Social Party and the Christian Democratic and Flemish, serving as senator (1991–1995) and MP (1995–2003).

Mairesse died on 15 January 2026, at the age of 80.
