= Amnesty International Belgique =

Amnesty International Belgique francophone is the French-speaking Belgian section of Amnesty International (AIBF).

It was founded in 1973 by a handful of volunteers, including Victor Solé.

Amnesty International Belgique francophone is a branch of the international human rights organization Amnesty International. Founded in 1971, Amnesty International Belgique francophone is dedicated to the protection and promotion of human rights in Belgium and throughout the world.

The organization's French-speaking section works closely with other Amnesty International branches around the world to combat human rights violations, including torture, enforced disappearances, the death penalty, restrictions on freedom of expression and peaceful assembly, discrimination and violence against women and minorities.

Members of Amnesty International Belgique francophone are volunteers committed to defending human rights. They run awareness campaigns, organize events to support victims of human rights violations, and lobby governments and political decision-makers to take action to promote and protect human rights. Over time, the association has acquired a larger number of paid staff, which has had an impact on the way it operates.

Amnesty International Belgique francophone is financed by donations from its members and supporters, as well as by government subsidies and donations from foundations. The organization claims to be independent of any government, political party or religion, and to work impartially to defend the human rights of all people, whatever their nationality, race, gender or religion.

== History and actions ==
The association's articles of association were published in the Moniteur Belge on 6 September 1973.

Amnesty International Belgique francophone conducts action, awareness-raising and advocacy campaigns. These campaigns are most often launched by the international movement, or relate to the situation in Belgium.

Certain issues, such as the death penalty and torture, can be considered permanent campaigns, and are regularly the subject of urgent action.

Since the 1980s, Amnesty International Belgique francophone has been fighting for the rights of asylum seekers and migrants in general. A campaign entitled "Je suis humain.e" was launched in 2017.

In 2004, AIBF set up a campaign against domestic violence, "Putting an end to violence against women, a fight for today". The organization has carried out numerous awareness-raising and advocacy actions on this subject. This campaign continues to this day. It has also incorporated the issue of rape and sexual violence, since 2014.

Regulation of arms sales is one of the organization's concerns, based on the Arms Trade Treaty, Common Position 2008/944/CFSP adopted by the European Council, and the Decree on the import, export, transit and transfer of defense-related products, other military equipment, law enforcement equipment, civilian firearms, parts and ammunition. The organization's actions regularly take the form of online petitions. Local groups take part in the association's actions and also raise funds, notably through the sale of candles.
