= List of Belgian European Film Award winners and nominees =

This is a list of Belgian European Film Award winners and nominees. This list details the performances of Belgian actors, actresses, and films that have either been submitted or nominated for, or have won, a European Film Award.

== Categories ==
=== Best Film ===
Year (Ceremony)	Recipient	Result	Note	Ref.
1991 (4th)	Toto the Hero	Nominated	Belgian-French-German co-production	
1993 (6th)	Man Bites Dog	Nominated		
1999 (12th)	Rosetta	Nominated		
2005 (18th)	L'Enfant	Nominated	Belgian-French co-production	
2011 (24th)	The Kid with a Bike	Nominated	Belgian-French-Italian co-production	
2013 (26th)	The Broken Circle Breakdown	Nominated		
2014 (27th)	Nymphomaniac – Director's Cut	Nominated	Danish-Belgian-French-German-British co-production	
2017 (30th)	Loveless	Nominated	Russian-Belgian-German-French co-production	
2018 (31st)	Girl	Nominated	Belgian-Dutch co-production	

=== Best Comedy ===
Year (Ceremony)	Recipient	Result	Note	Ref.
2015 (28th)	The Brand New Testament	Nominated	French-Belgian-Luxembourgish co-production	
2017 (30th)	King of the Belgians	Nominated	Belgian-Dutch-Bulgarian co-production	
2017 (30th)	Vincent	Nominated	Belgian-French co-production	
2018 (31st)	The Death of Stalin	Won	French-British-Belgian co-production	

=== European Discovery of the Year ===
Year (Ceremony)	Recipient	Result	Note	Ref.
1991 (4th)	Toto the Hero	Won	Belgian-French-German co-production	
1993 (6th)	Man Bites Dog	Nominated		
1994 (7th)	Son of the Shark	Won	French-Belgian-Luxembourgish co-production	
2005 (18th)	When the Sea Rises	Nominated	Belgian-French co-production	
2011 (24th)	Oxygen	Won	Belgian-Dutch co-production	
2018 (31st)	Girl	Won	Belgian-Dutch co-production	
2019 (32nd)	Atlantics	Nominated	French-Senegalese-Belgian co-production	
2020 (33rd)	Jumbo	Nominated	French-Belgian-Luxembourgish co-production	

=== Best Animated Feature Film ===
Year (Ceremony)	Recipient	Result	Note	Ref.
2009 (22nd)	The Secret of Kells	Nominated	Belgian-French-Irish co-production	
2010 (23rd)	Sammy's Adventures: the Secret Passage	Nominated		
2011 (24th)	A Cat in Paris	Nominated	French-Belgian co-production	
2013 (26th)	The Congress	Won	Israeli-German-Polish-Luxembourgish-French-Belgian co-production	
2013 (26th)	Pinocchio	Nominated	Italian-Luxembourgish-French-Belgian co-production	
2014 (27th)	Jack and the Cuckoo-Clock Heart	Nominated	French-Belgian co-production	
2014 (27th)	Minuscule: Valley of the Lost Ants	Nominated	French-Belgian co-production	
2015 (28th)	Song of the Sea	Won	Irish-French-Luxembourgish-Danish-Belgian co-production	
2017 (30th)	Zombillenium	Nominated	French-Belgian co-production	
2018 (31st)	Another Day of Life	Won	Polish-Spanish-Belgian-German-Hungarian co-production	
2019 (32nd)	Marona's Fantastic Tale	Nominated	French-Romanian-Belgian co-production	
2020 (33rd)	Josep	Won	French-Belgian-Spanish co-production	

=== Best Short Film ===
Year (Ceremony)	Recipient	Result	Note	Ref.
2002 (15th)	Muno	Nominated		
2002 (15th)	Wedding Night	Nominated	Belgian-France co-production	
2003 (16th)	La Chanson-Chanson	Nominated		
2003 (16th)	Mamaman	Nominated		
2003 (16th)	The Wallet	Nominated	French-Belgian co-production	
2004 (17th)	The Card Thieves	Nominated	Belgian-French co-production	
2005 (18th)	Flatlife	Nominated		
2006 (19th)	Meander	Nominated		
2007 (20th)	Plot Point	Nominated		
2008 (21st)	The Altruists	Nominated		
2009 (22nd)	Good Night	Nominated	Belgian-French co-production	
2009 (22nd)	Swimming Lesson	Nominated		
2010 (23rd)	Venus VS Me	Nominated		
2011 (24th)	Dimanches	Nominated		
2013 (26th)	Death of a Shadow	Won	Belgian-French co-production	
2013 (26th)	Houses with Small Windows	Nominated		
2014 (27th)	A Town Called Panic: The Christmas Log	Nominated	Belgian-French co-production	
2016 (29th)	The Wall	Nominated		
2016 (29th)	The Fullness of Time (Romance)	Nominated	French-Belgian co-production	
2018 (31st)	Kapitalistis	Nominated	Belgian-French co-production	
2018 (31st)	Release the Dogs	Nominated	French-Belgian co-production	
2018 (31st)	Wildebeest	Nominated		
2020 (33rd)	Sun Dog	Nominated	Belgian-Russian co-production	

=== Best Documentary ===
Year (Ceremony)	Recipient	Result	Note	Ref.
1992 (5th)	Lovers on Trial	Special mention		
1997 (10th)	Gigi, Monica... and Bianca	Won	Belgian-Romanian co-production	
1998 (11th)	Painting with Falls	Won		
1999 (12th)	The Truth Commission	Nominated		
1999 (12th)	Mobutu, King of Zaire	Nominated		
2003 (16th)	The Five Obstructions	Nominated	Danish-Belgian-Swiss-French co-production	
2003 (16th)	Whose Is This Song?	Nominated	Bulgarian-Belgian co-production	
2003 (16th)	A Species' Odyssey	Nominated	French-Canadian-Italian-Swiss-Belgian co-production	
2004 (17th)	Darwin's Nightmare	Won	Austrian-French-Belgian co-production	
2007 (20th)	Where is the Love in the Palmgrove?	Nominated		
2009 (22nd)	The Damned of the Sea	Nominated		
2012 (25th)	Tea or Electricity	Nominated	Belgian-French-Moroccan co-production	
2014 (27th)	Waiting for August	Nominated	Belgian-Romanian co-production	
2016 (29th)	A Family Affair	Nominated	Dutch-Belgian co-production	
2016 (29th)	The Land of the Enlightened	Nominated	Belgian-Irish-Dutch-German co-production	

=== Best Director ===
Year (Ceremony)	Recipient	Work	Result	Note	Ref.
2011 (24th)	Jean-Pierre Dardenne and Luc Dardenne	The Kid with a Bike	Nominated		
2013 (26th)	Felix van Groeningen	The Broken Circle Breakdown	Nominated		

=== Best Actor ===
Year (Ceremony)	Recipient	Work	Result	Note	Ref.
1993 (6th)	Jan Decleir	Daens	Nominated		
2002 (15th)	Olivier Gourmet	The Son	Nominated		
2005 (18th)	Jérémie Renier	L'Enfant	Nominated		
2013 (26th)	Johan Heldenbergh	The Broken Circle Breakdown	Nominated		
2018 (31st)	Victor Polster	Girl	Nominated		

=== Best Actress ===
Year (Ceremony)	Recipient	Work	Result	Note	Ref.
1998 (11th)	Natacha Regnier	The Dreamlife of Angels	Won		
1999 (12th)	Emilie Dequenne	Rosetta	Nominated		
2009 (22nd)	Yolande Moreau	Séraphine	Nominated		
2011 (24th)	Cécile de France	The Kid with a Bike	Nominated		
2012 (25th)	Émilie Dequenne	Our Children	Nominated		
2013 (26th)	Veerle Baetens	The Broken Circle Breakdown	Won		

=== Best Composer ===
Year (Ceremony)	Recipient	Work	Result	Note	Ref.
2008 (21st)	Tuur Florizoone	Moscow, Belgium	Nominated		

=== Best Screenwriter ===
Year (Ceremony)	Recipient	Work	Result	Note	Ref.
1991 (4th)	Jaco Van Dormael	Toto the Hero	Won		
1997 (10th)	Chris Vander Stappen and Alain Berliner	Ma Vie en Rose	Won		
2011 (24th)	Jean-Pierre Dardenne and Luc Dardenne	The Kid with a Bike	Won		
2013 (26th)	Felix Van Groeningen and Carl Joos	The Broken Circle Breakdown	Nominated		
2014 (27th)	Jean-Pierre Dardenne and Luc Dardenne	Two Days, One Night	Nominated		

=== Best Cinematographer ===
Year (Ceremony)	Recipient	Work	Result	Note	Ref.
1991 (4th)	Walther van den Ende	Toto the Hero	Won		
1998 (10th)	Dany Elsen	The Red Dwarf	Nominated		

=== Best European Co-Producer ===
Year (Ceremony)	Recipient	Result	Note	Ref.
2009 (22nd)	Diana Elbaum	Won		

=== People's Choice Award for Best European Film ===
Year (Ceremony)	Recipient	Result	Note	Ref.
2002 (15th)	The Son	Nominated	Belgian-French co-production	
2004 (17th)	Since Otar Left	Nominated	French-Belgian-Georgian co-production	
2006 (19th)	Joyeux Noël	Nominated	French-German-British-Belgian-Romanian-Norwegian-Japanese-American co-production	
2006 (19th)	L'Enfant	Nominated	Belgian-French co-production	
2007 (20th)	Black Book	Nominated	Dutch-German-British-Belgian co-production	
2008 (21st)	Ben X	Nominated	Belgian-Dutch co-production	
2009 (22nd)	Fly Me to the Moon	Nominated	Belgian-American co-production	
2010 (23rd)	Mr. Nobody	Won		
2011 (24th)	Potiche	Nominated	French-Belgian co-production	
2012 (25th)	Come as You Are	Won		
2013 (26th)	The Broken Circle Breakdown	Nominated		
2014 (27th)	Nymphomaniac	Nominated	Danish-Belgian-French-German co-production	
2014 (27th)	Two Days, One Night	Nominated	Belgian-Italian-French co-production	
2016 (29th)	The Brand New Testament	Nominated	Belgian-French-Luxembourgish co-production	
2017 (30th)	Graduation	Nominated	Romanian-French-Belgian co-production	
2018 (31st)	The Death of Stalin	Nominated	British-French-Belgian co-production	
2019 (32nd)	Girl	Nominated	Belgian-Dutch co-production	

=== Young Audience Award ===
Year (Ceremony)	Recipient	Result	Note	Ref.
2012 (25th)	Blue Bird	Nominated	Belgian-French co-production	
2013 (26th)	The Suicide Shop	Nominated	French-Belgian-Canadian co-production	

=== European University Film Award ===
Year (Ceremony)	Recipient	Result	Note	Ref.
2016 (29th)	Graduation	Nominated	Romanian-French-Belgian co-production	
2017 (30th)	Home	Nominated		
2017 (30th)	Loveless	Nominated	Russian-Belgian-German-French co-production	
2019 (32nd)	God Exists, Her Name Is Petrunija	Nominated	Macedonian-Belgian-Slovenian-French-Croatian co-production	

== See also ==
- List of Belgian submissions for the Academy Award for Best International Feature Film
