= Lionel Vinche =

Belgian painter (1936–2025)

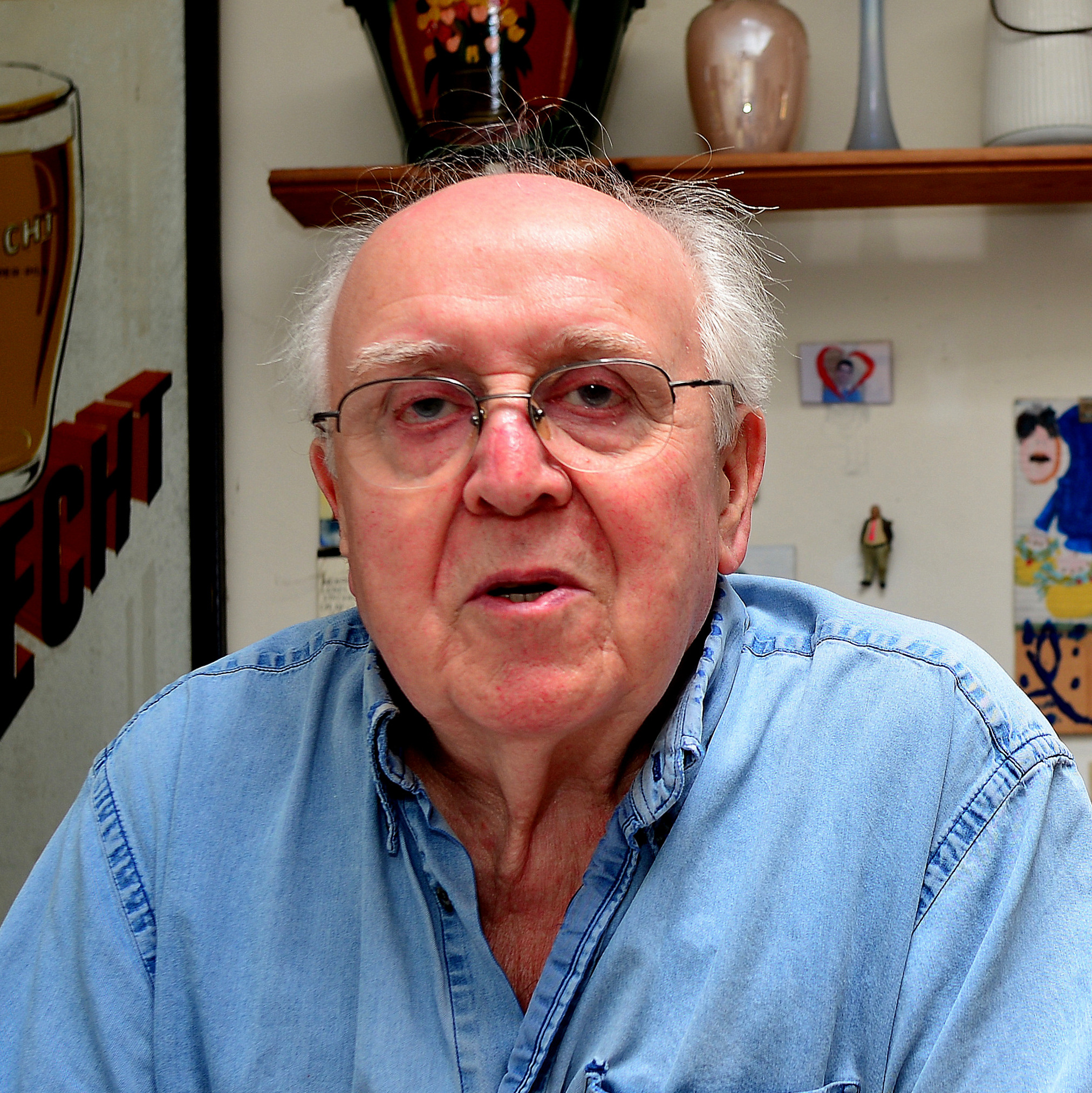
- Vinche in 2017
- Born: 21 October 1936; Antoing, Belgium
- Died: 12 September 2025 (aged 88)
- Education: Conservatoire de Tournai; Royal Conservatory of Brussels
- Occupation: Painter

Lionel Vinche (21 October 1936 – 12 September 2025) was a Belgian painter.

In addition to painting, he also acted at the Théâtre national Wallonie-Bruxelles. A collection of his works can be found at the King Baudouin Foundation in Brussels.

Vinche died on 12 September 2025, at the age of 88.

== Selective exhibitions ==
- D'un bonheur à l'autre (Genappe, 2006)
- Le quartier déménage (Genappe, 2010)
- Avant la brocante (Genappe, 2014)
- Vinche à la lettre(Wittockiana, Brussels, 2015)
- Il était une fois… (Genappe, 2016)
- Bestiaire (Genappe, 1965–2018)

== Works ==
- La Sieste de Tinguely sous son lampadaire à pédales (1975)
- Autoportrait – Dieu le père vaut de l’or (1978)
- Le Turc ostendais se repose dans son canapé avec une nana rose (1987)
- Jambes en l'air (1990, 1991)
- Avant une promenade, soir pluvieux, oiseau rouge (1992)
- Le Ciel est tout gris (2002)
