= Johan Vermeersch =

Belgian footballer (1951–2025)

- Vermeersch as president of R.W.D.M. Brussels

Personal information
- Date of birth: 10 November 1951
- Place of birth: Langemark, Belgium
- Date of death: 19 August 2025 (aged 73)
- Position: Midfielder

Youth career
- ?–1971: KVK Ypres

Senior career*
Years	Team	Apps	(Gls)
1971–1973	Daring Club de Bruxelles		
1973–1974	R.W.D. Molenbeek		
1974–1981	K.V. Kortrijk		
1981–1982	Gent		

Managerial career
- 1982–1983: R.W.D. Molenbeek
- 1984: Racing Jet Wavre
- * Club domestic league appearances and goals

Johan Vermeersch (10 November 1951 – 19 August 2025) was a Belgian footballer and manager who played as a midfielder.

Vermeersch played for Daring Club de Bruxelles, R.W.D. Molenbeek, K.V. Kortrijk and KAA Gent. After his playing career, he served as manager for R.W.D. Molenbeek an Racing Jet Wavre and went on to be president of the former club and of R.W.D.M. Brussels F.C..

Vermeersch died on 19 August 2025, at the age of 73.
