= Lode Wils =

Belgian historian and academic (1929–2024)

- Born: Lodewijk Jan Wils; 18 March 1929; Antwerp, Belgium
- Died: 10 December 2024 (aged 95); Heverlee, Belgium
- Education: Catholic University of Leuven
- Occupation(s): Historian, academic

Lodewijk Jan "Lode" Wils (18 March 1929 – 10 December 2024) was a Belgian historian and academic. He studied at the Catholic University of Leuven and became a professor of history at KU Leuven following the split between the French and Dutch-language universities, serving in this role until 1995. His works are archived at the Archive for National Movements. Wils died in Heverlee on 10 December 2024, at the age of 95.

== Works ==
- Flamenpolitik en Activisme. Vlaanderen tegenover België in de Eerste Wereldoorlog (1974)
- Van Clovis tot Happart. De lange weg van de naties in de lage landen (1992)
- Joris van Severen: Een aristocraat verdwaald in de politiek (1994)
- Vlaanderen, België, Groot-Nederland: Mythe en geschiedenis (1994)
- Waarom Vlaanderen Nederlands spreekt (2001)
- Histoire des nations belges : Belgique, Flandre, Wallonie : quinze siècles de passé commun (2005)
