= Orazio Schena =

Italian footballer (1941–2024)

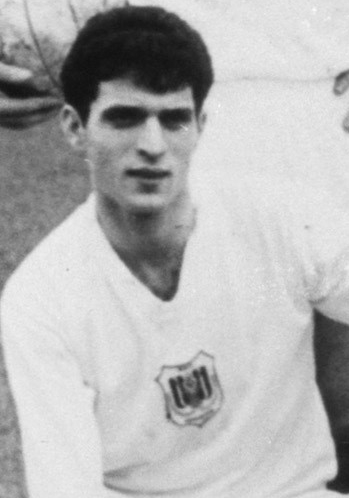
- Schena with Anderlecht

Personal information
- Date of birth: 30 October 1941
- Place of birth: Bari, Italy
- Date of death: 30 January 2024 (aged 82)
- Place of death: Binche, Belgium
- Position: Forward

Youth career
- 1952–1962: RFC Ressaix
- 1962–1963: Anderlecht

Senior career*
Years	Team	Apps	(Gls)
1963–1964	Anderlecht		
1964–1965	Royal Crossing Club Molenbeek		
1965–1968	RFC Liège		
1968–1970	Tilleur		
1970–1973	RAAL La Louvière		
- * Club domestic league appearances and goals

Orazio Schena (30 October 1941 – 30 January 2024) was an Italian professional football player and coach who played as a forward.

== Playing career ==
In 1952 Schena started playing in the youth team of RFC Ressaix, a club where he remained until 1962, the year in which he joined Anderlecht; in the 1962–63 season he played in the youth team of the Belgian capital club, while in the 1963–64 season he made his debut in the first team: in particular, he played one match (26 January 1964, in the 3–0 victory against Club Brugge) and scored one goal in the Belgian Cup and 13 matches in the Belgian first division, to whose victory he contributed by scoring 6 goals. After winning the championship with Anderlecht he moved to Royal Crossing Club Molenbeek, with whom he played in the Belgian second division in the 1964–65 season. After just one season he returned to play in the first division, this time with the RFC Liège shirt, with which in the 1965–66 championship he obtained qualification for the Fairs Cup for the following season; in the same season he also played two matches in this cup (both matches in the first round against the Croatians of Dinamo Zagreb, who passed the round with an aggregate 2–1), in which he played a further match in the 1966–67 edition (on 1 November 1966, in the return match of the second round lost 2–1 at home against Lokomotive Leipzig) and two matches in the 1967–68 edition (both the matches of the second round of the tournament against the Scottish Dundee, victorious with an aggregate 7–2), for a total of five goalless appearances in UEFA competitions. Over the course of his three-year period at the club (all in the top flight, with also a third place in the 1966–67 championship) he also scored a total of 8 goals in 36 championship matches. In 1968 he left the team and joined Tilleur, a club from the suburbs of Liège playing in the second division, where he remained for two consecutive seasons, until 1970. In 1970 he moved to RAAL La Louvière, another second-tier club, with whom he played three consecutive championships in this category, leaving the team at the end of the relegation to the third division in the 1972–73 season. In his career he has made a total of 49 appearances and 14 goals in the Belgian first division.

== Coaching career ==
In November 2001 Schena took over as coach of Houdinois, second to last in the Belgian fifth division, and coached the team until the end of the 2001–02 season. In the 2002–03 season and in the 2003–04 season he coached Heppignies in the Belgian fourth division. Subsequently, in the 2005–06 season he managed Châtelet. Shortly before the start of the 2009–10 season he left the amateur bench of RUS Binche after a few years, being replaced on the bench by his brother Cosimo, who had already coached the team in a previous period. In the 2011–12 season and in the first months of the 2012–13 season he coached RFC Ressaix, a team of which his nephew Damien (son of Dominique, who died aged 51 in 2011) is president.

== Death ==
Schena died in Binche on 30 January 2024, at the age of 82.
