= Yahyah Michot =

Belgian Muslim academic (1952–2025)

Yahya Michot (born Jean Michot; 3 July 1952 – 1 April 2025) was a Belgian Muslim academic who was a professor of Islamic studies.

Michot was the president of the Higher Council of Muslims in Belgium from 1995 to 1998. He taught at the Hartford Seminary, Connecticut as a professor of Islamic Studies and Christian-Muslim Relations. He was also the editor of the journal "The Muslim World" edited by the Seminary.

Michot died on 1 April 2025, at the age of 72.

== Works ==
- IBN SÎNÂ. Lettre au vizir Abû Sa'd", 2000;
- "AVICENNE. Réfutation de l'astrologie" , 2000;
- Ibn Taymiyya: Muslims under non-Muslim Rule (2006),
- Ahmad al-Aqhisârî: Against Smoking. An Ottoman Manifesto, 2010;
- Musulmans en Europe, (2002).
