= Christoph Haizmann =

Austrian painter (1651–1700)

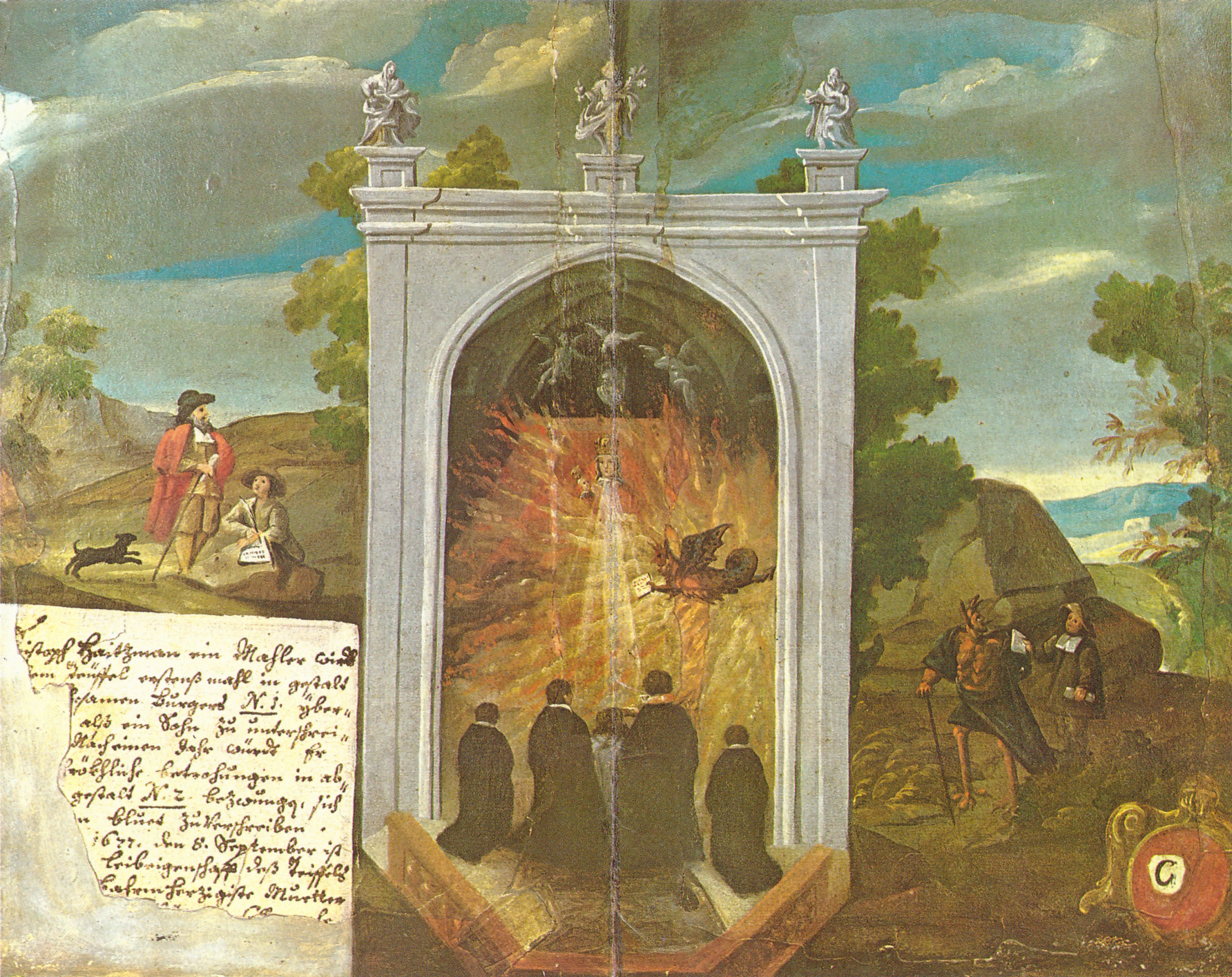
Haizmann's votive painting (triptych). Left: Satan appears as a fine burgher, and Haizmann signs a pact with ink. Right: The Devil reappears a year later and forces Haizmann to sign another pact with his own blood. Middle: The Virgin Mary makes the Devil to return the second pact during an exorcism.

Johann Christoph Haizmann (1651/52 – 14 March 1700) was a Bavarian-born Austrian painter who is known for his autobiographically depicted demonical neurosis. The so-called Haizmann case has been studied in psychology and psychiatry since the early twentieth century, especially by Sigmund Freud and Gaston Vandendriessche.

== Early life ==
Christoph Haizmann was born in Traunstein, Bavaria, in 1651 or 1652.

== Facts ==
Little is known about him before 1677. He was an impoverished painter, and when he lost a parent, he allegedly sold his soul to the devil in 1668, to be his bounden son for nine years; after that time, Haizmann's body and soul were to belong to the devil. Haizmann claimed that he gave two pacts to the devil, one written in ink and the other in his own blood.

== Exorcisms ==
However, in 1677, when the pacts were due, he became anxious and made a pilgrimage to Mariazell, and after a successful exorcism, the pact in blood was given back to him by the devil.

As the demonic infestations continued, Haizmann concluded that another exorcism was necessary to retrieve also the pact on ink; that happened in 1678.

== Painting ==
Haizmann painted several pictures of the appearances of the devil (a triptych and a series of eight portraits with captions) and kept a diary of his visions.

== Later life and death ==
After his demonical neurosis, Haizmann became a Brother Hospitaller. He died in 1700 in Neustadt an der Mettau in Bohemia (currently Nové Město nad Metují in Czech).

== Manuscript record and research ==
To preserve the details of the successful exorcism, a manuscript, partly in Latin, partly in German, was composed sometime between 1714 and 1729, titled Trophæum Mariano-Cellense. It was rediscovered in the archive in the early 1920s, and Sigmund Freud was the first to analyze it in an article entitled "A Seventeenth-Century Demonological Neurosis" (1923). After him, several other writers have discussed the case. The most extensive research (including two books) has probably been carried out by the Belgian psychologist Gaston Vandendriessche; other notable writers include Michel de Certeau and H. C. Erik Midelfort.

A facsimile of the Trophæum Mariano-Cellense manuscript, along with an English translation, colour illustrations and critique of Freud, was published in 1956 by Ida Macalpine and Richard A. Hunter: Schizophrenia, 1677: A Psychiatric Study of an Illustrated Autobiographical Record of Demoniacal Possession.

== Haizmann in popular culture ==
In 2003, a low-budget horror mockumentary Searching for Haizmann was released. According to the storyline of this movie, Haizmann, as the son of the devil, is the Anti-Christ, and he did not die in 1700 but was smuggled to America and he still lives there.

== Literature ==
- Allen, David F. 1999: Schizophrenia 1677? La "controverse" Freud, Macalpine et Hunter. Critique de la raison psychiatrique: Éléments pour une histoire raisonnée de la schizophrénie, pp. 77–99. Érès, Toulouse.
- Bergande, Wolfram 2003: 9t – ein Rebus Freuds? Analysen Texte: Dokumentation Rebus Tagung 23. August 2003, pp. 39–45. PDF version.
- Certeau, Michel de 1988 [1970]: What Freud Makes of History: A Seventeenth-Century Demonological Neurosis. The Writing of History, pp. 287–307. (Translated by Tom Conley.) Columbia University Press, New York. ISBN 0-231-05574-9
- Freud, Sigmund 1961 [1923]: A Seventeenth-Century Demonological Neurosis. The Standard Edition of the Complete Psychological Works of Sigmund Freud XIX, pp. 72–105. The Hogarth Press, London.
- Harnischfeger, Johannes 2003: »Eine Teufelsneurose im siebzehnten Jahrhundert« – Sigmund Freuds Lektüre einer fernen Krankengeschichte. Psyche 4, vol. 57, pp. 313–342.
- Jones, Ernest 1957: Sigmund Freud, Life and Work 3. The Last Phase, 1911–1939. The Hogarth Press, London.
- Kretzenbacher, Leopold 1951: Faust in Mariazell: Nachtrag zur Chronik des Wiener Goethe-Vereins, XXXIV, S. 1 ff. Chronik des Wiener Goethe-Vereins (vol. 55), pp. 28–30.
- Kudszus, Winfried G. 1992: Freud's Faust Case, Christoph Haitzmann. Signs of Humanity. L'homme et ses signes. Vol. 2 (edited by Michel Balat et alii), pp. 1043–1048. Mouton de Gruyter, Berlin.
- Macalpine, Ida – Hunter, Richard A. 1954: Observations on the Psychoanalytic Theory of Psychosis: Freud's "A Neurosis of Demoniacal Possession in the Seventeenth Century." The British Journal of Medical Psychology (vol. 27), pp. 175–192.
- Macalpine, Ida – Hunter, Richard A. 1956: Schizophrenia, 1677: A Psychiatric Study of an Illustrated Autobiographical Record of Demoniacal Possession. W. Dawson, London.
- Midelfort, H. C. Erik 1986: Catholic and Lutheran Reactions to Demon Possession in the Late Seventeenth Century. Daphnis: Zeitschrift für mittlere Deutsche Literatur (vol. 15), pp. 623–648.
- Payer-Thurn, Richard 1924: Faust in Mariazell. Chronik des Wiener Goethe-Vereins, (vol. 34), pp. 1–18.
- Renoux, Christian 2000: L'affaire Haizmann: une possession baroque. Essaim 5, pp. 115–137.
- Renoux, Christian 2002: Freud et l'affaire Haizmann. Psychoanalytische Perspectieven 2 (vol. 20), pp. 309–325.
- Renoux, Christian 2011: Christoph Haizmann († 1700) entre démons familiers et ange gardien. Boudet, Jean-Patrice - Faure, Philippe - Renoux, Christian 2011: De Socrate à Tintin. Anges gardiens et démons familiers de l'Antiquité à nos jours. PUR, Rennes.
- Thurn, David H. 1993: Fideikommißbibliothek: Freud's "Demonological Neurosis." MLN: Modern Language Notes 5 (vol. 108), pp. 849–874.
- Urtubey, Luisa de 1983: Freud et le diable. Presses Universitaires de France, Paris.
- Vandendriessche, Gaston 1962: Het Haizmann-geval van Sigmund Freud: Onderzoek betreffende het grondmateriaalen de psychologische interpretaties. (Unpublished dissertation.) Leuven.
- Vandendriessche, Gaston 1964: Het probleem van de dood van de vader in het Haizmann-geval van Sigmund Freud. Nederlands tijdsschrift voor de Psychologie en haar grensgebieden (vol. 19), pp. 446–467.
- Vandendriessche, Gaston 1965: The Parapraxis in the Haizmann Case of Sigmund Freud. Publications Universitaires, Louvain.
- Vandendriessche, Gaston 1975: La bisexualité dans le cas Haizmann: Un cas de possession démoniaque étudié par Freud. Revue française de Psychanalyse (vol. 39), pp. 999–1012.
- Vandendriessche, Gaston 1978: Ambivalence et anti-ambivalence dans le cas Haizmann de Freud: Le choix impossible d'un psychotique. Revue française de Psychanalyse (vol. 42), pp. 1081–1088.
- Vandendriessche, Gaston 1985–1986: Johann Christoph Haitzmann – ein Teufelsbündler im 17. Jahrhundert. Mitteilungsblatt der Kulturverwaltung der Stadt St. Pölten, issues 11/1985, p. 43– & 12/1985, pp. 46–48 & 1/1986, p. 3–.
- Vandendriessche, Gaston 1986a: Der Teufelsbündler Johann Christoph Haitzmann. Prinz Eugen und das barocke Österreich (edited by Karl Gutkas), p. 348. Kuratorium zur Veranstaltung der Ausstellung, Wien. ISBN 978-3-7017-0428-6 Online version.
- Vandendriessche, Gaston 1986b: Johann Christoph Haitzman (1651–1700): Barocke Teufelsaustreibung in Mariazell. Welt des Barock (edited by Rupert Feuchtmüller & Elisabeth Kovács), pp. 141–145. Herder & Co., Wien. ISBN 3-210-24823-0
- Vandendriessche, Gaston 1991: Christoph Haitzman's Paintings: An Unknown Seventeenth-Century Pictorial Codex of Diseases and Medicaments. Actes du XXXII^{e} Congrès International d'Histoire de la Médecine: Anvers 3–7 septembre 1990 (edited by Eric Fierens et alii), pp. 1167–1176. Societas Belgica Historiae Medicinae, Bruxelles.
