= Ida Macalpine =

German-British psychiatrist (1899–1974)

- Born: Ida Wertheimer; 19 June 1899; Nuremberg, Bavaria, German Empire
- Died: 2 May 1974 (aged 74); London, United Kingdom
- Education: University of Erlangen
- Children: 2, including Richard A. Hunter
- Medical career
- Field: Psychiatry
- Research: History of psychiatry
- Notable works: Three Hundred Years of Psychiatry (1963); George III and the Mad Business (1969); Psychiatry for the Poor: 1851–1973 (1974)

Ida Macalpine (formerly Hirschmann, née Wertheimer; 1899–1974) was a German and British psychiatrist. She was born in Germany, where she earned her medical degree and began her career as a physician. She moved to the United Kingdom in 1933 and specialized in psychiatry. She began extensively publishing on psychiatry, especially history of psychiatry, in the 1950s. Particularly fruitful was her collaboration with her son Richard A. Hunter, also a psychiatrist. She was initially strongly influenced by psychoanalysis, but abandoned it by the late 1950s. The first of her and Hunter's major works, Three Hundred Years of Psychiatry, was published in 1963. In George III and the Mad Business (1969), they identified King George III's apparent mental illness as porphyria. Their final major work, Psychiatry for the Poor: 1851–1973, was published shortly after her death.

== Early life and education ==
Ida Wertheimer was born on 19 June 1899 in Nuremberg, Germany, to Matilde (née Lust) and Sigmund Wertheimer. She was of Jewish heritage and the fourth of five children. Sigmund was a successful businessman, sometime head of the Nuremberg city council, and a reserve officer in the Imperial German Army. The Wertheimers valued education and encouraged their two daughters as well as their sons to pursue it. Ida attended to the wounded of the First World War as a schoolgirl and resolved to become a physician.

She began medical studies at Erlangen in 1918 and later continued them at Freiburg, Munich, and Berlin. As a student, she supported herself by making anatomical and pathological drawings for her teachers. She paused her training in 1921 to marry. Strongminded and determined, she resumed her medical career while her two children were still young and earned her Doctor of Medicine (MD) degree from Erlangen in 1925. Her older brother Friedrich (Fredric Wertham) also became a physician.

== Career ==
=== Medical practice ===
After qualifying, Macalpine worked in Berlin with children and held a part-time post at the Pestalozzi-Fröbel Haus. After her MD thesis was published, she coauthored a monograph with her brother addressing the issue of surplus women and the expected fall in birthrates following the deaths of young men in the First World War.

In 1933, Macalpine and her three brothers fled Germany to escape Nazi persecution. She took her mother and two young sons to England, where she had a sister. In 1934 she obtained the Scottish Triple Qualification, allowing her to practise in Great Britain, and set up a practice in London. During the Second World War and for several years after, she lived in Lancashire and spent part of that time assisting understaffed mental hospitals.

Macalpine returned to London in 1948. She specialized and practised actively in psychiatry. She was appointed assistant psychiatrist to the dermatology department at St Bartholomew's Hospital in October 1949, where she was able to explore her interest in psychodermatology. Around then she became interested in the history of medicine, especially of psychiatry. Macalpine spent part of her time observing a dermatologist. This allowed her to understand the dermatologist's perspective and, in brief discussions after each patient, to indicate whether she considered psychotherapy likely to be beneficial. She authored papers about pruritus ani, syphilophobia, and alopecia areata. She resigned from St Bartholomew's in February 1962.

=== Research ===
==== Development of theoretical influences ====
From the 1950s onward, Macalpine published extensively on psychiatry, often collaborating with her son Richard Hunter on historical studies. Macalpine and Hunter, also a psychiatrist, were in active medical practice and used their spare time to prepare their publications. Though not trained historians, they applied scholarly discipline and uncovered overlooked archival materials. Theirs was the most productive partnership in psychiatric history research and the only one between mother and son. She argued that descriptions of mental symptoms by early physicians could still hold value and that tracing the evolution of psychiatric thought might help solve contemporary psychiatric puzzles.

Macalpine's work was initially strongly influenced by Sigmund Freud. She explored the unconscious and psychosomatic roots of skin disorders, praised Freud as "the Harvey of the mind", and, with Hunter, produced overtly Freudian studies of transference and psychohistorical interpretations such as their analysis of Gioachino Rossini's music through Oedipal theory. By the mid-1950s, Macalpine and Hunter's outlook shifted toward object-relations theory and growing dissatisfaction with the divide between psychoanalysis, psychiatry, and general medicine.

Macalpine and Hunter reprinted classic psychiatric texts in the "Dawson" series, of which they were sole contributors. In that series, they brought out the first English translation of Daniel Paul Schreber's Memoirs of My Nervous Illness. Their translations and commentaries on Schreber's Memoirs and the writings of Christoph Haizmann questioned Freud's interpretations, suggesting instead pre-Oedipal conflicts and gender identity anxieties. From the later 1950s, Macalpine and Hunter abandoned psychoanalysis altogether, embracing an organic and neurological model of mental illness. Three Hundred Years of Psychiatry (1963), a comprehensive and scholarly anthology of psychiatric texts, presented psychiatric history as a record of progress in recognizing the somatic basis of mental disorders.

==== George III and porphyria controversy ====
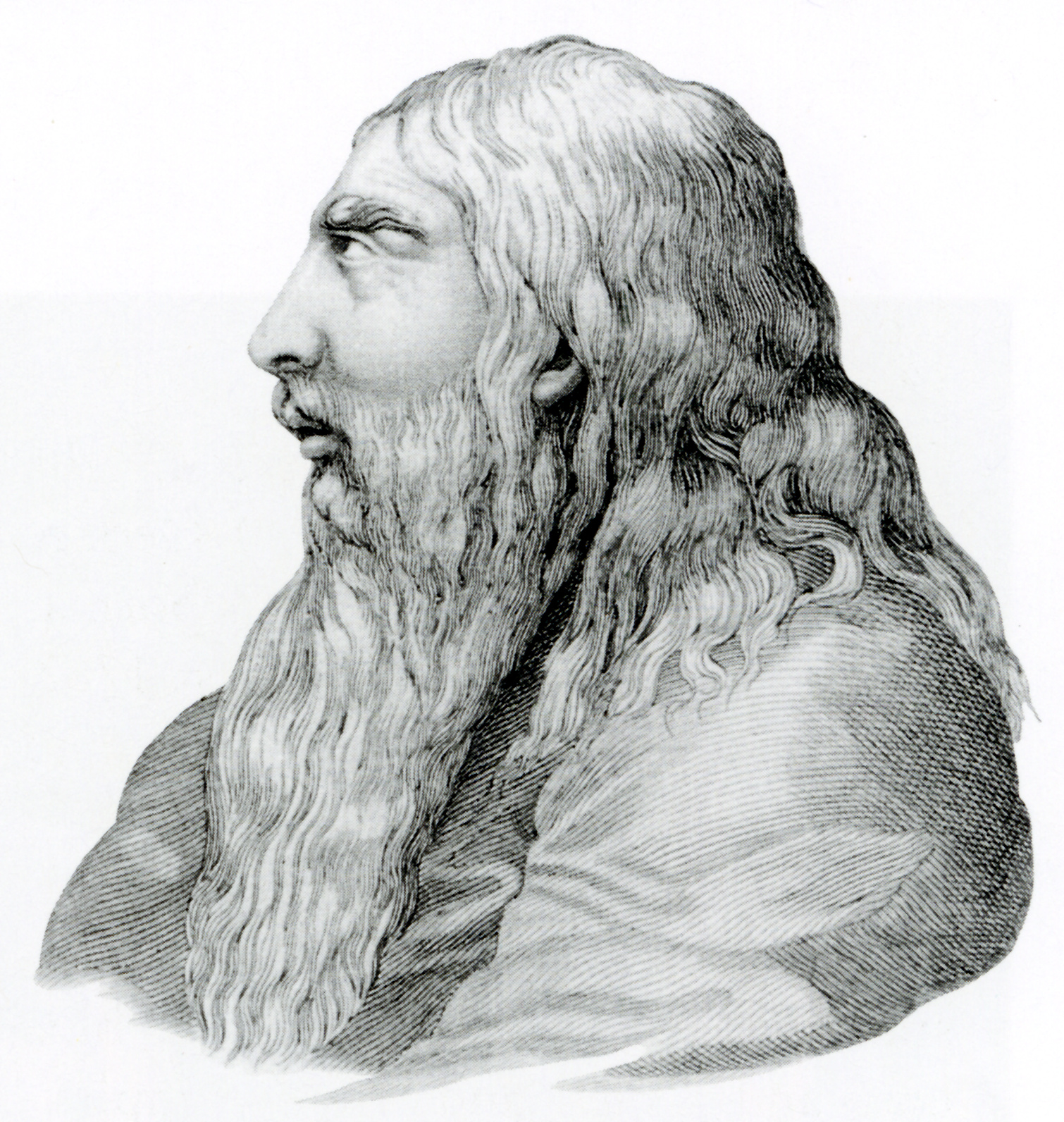
Engraving by Henry Meyer, 1817, depicting an elderly King George

By 1965, Macalpine and Hunter had become convinced that the episodes of derangement of George III (r. 1760–1820), a British king from the House of Hanover, had not been caused by a mental illness but by porphyria, a hereditary metabolic disorder. To prove their hypothesis, they needed to establish the presence of porphyria in George III's descendants by researching their medical histories and analysing urine and faecal samples. Macalpine contacted the head of the House of Hanover, Prince Ernest Augustus, and in 1967 went to Germany to collect samples of urine and faeces of an elderly kinswoman of his who often stayed with him and exhibited symptoms of the disorder; Macalpine called her "Patient B". The results of the analysis conducted by the chemical pathologist Claude Rimington were inconclusive. Another descendant, "Patient A", had been treated by the Swiss porphyria expert Alfredo Vannotti; Macalpine recounted how, "Vannotti found a friend of the titled lady and asked him to procure specimens. This man was so stupid to ask whether she would receive me!! And she said no thank you." (Note: "Patient A", identified by Röhl et al. as Princess Adalbert of Prussia, did not know that she was included in the study. Prince Ernest Augustus also provided another urine sample, which he said was his own and which was found to be "weakly positive"; in 1985 he revealed to the historian John Röhl that the sample actually came from his wife, Princess Ortrud, who was descended from King George II.)

Macalpine and Hunter came forward with their hypothesis in 1968, sparking a widespread interest and controversy. The sharpest critics of the hypothesis were porphyria experts Charles Enrique Dent and Geoffrey Dean. The debate, which was led in both private correspondence and in letters published by the British Medical Journal, turned acrimonious. It was exacerbated by Macalpine's confident, declarative style. Another porphyria expert, Abraham Goldberg, considered the diagnosis reasonable but "not proven" and advised Macalpine and Hunter to adjust the tone of their writing accordingly. Macalpine suspected that Dent, Dean, and others were motivated by a personal vendetta against Rimington, with whom Macalpine and Hunter had authored the 1968 article "Porphyria In The Royal Houses Of Stuart, Hanover, And Prussia", and recruited support for him. The epidemiologist Archie Cochrane, himself a porphyric, wrote to Macalpine and Hunter to thank them for bringing the disorder into spotlight.

In their seminal work George III and the Mad Business (1969), Macalpine and Hunter connected the king's symptoms with porphyria and argued that he had inherited it from his Stuart ancestors, finding comparable symptoms in King James VI and I and Mary, Queen of Scots. They also identified comparable symptoms in George III's descendants but felt restrained from naming these descendants publicly. (Note: Macalpine and Hunter also suspected that an uncle of Queen Elizabeth II might have porphyria. Prince William of Gloucester, son of Queen Elizabeth II's uncle Prince Henry, Duke of Gloucester, was diagnosed with porphyria in 1968. The diagnosis was made, after examination, by the prince's physician, Headley Bellringer; Professor Ishihara in Tokyo; and the dermatologist Arthur Rook. Geoffrey Dean, whom Macalpine considered a member of the "axis" of the opponents to her hypothesis, accepted the diagnosis and in the 1990s commented that Macalpine and Hunter might have been right about George III's illness.) Historians came to accept, and some even strongly advocate, porphyria as George III's illness in the 1970s. George III and the Mad Business dismissed psychodynamic readings of the king's illness and portraying the diagnosis of porphyria as the triumph of scientific psychiatry over speculation. Macalpine complained that the greatest difficulty she and Hunter encountered in their research was the "squeamishness" of George III's then-living descendants to "supply the necessary goods" (samples of urine and faeces). She wrote, "How I look forward to the time when we no longer depend on Royalty."

Stephen Lock, haematologist and editor-in-chief of the British Medical Journal, wrote that Macalpine "was unscientific in her approach: she would almost have crucified anybody who dared to oppose her, taking opposition personally–but would hint of eminent personages who confirmed her story (and even of having got clandestine specimens of Royal urine, which had proved positive)." Near the end of her life, Macalpine organized and presented her collection of early printed works and items related to King George III in an exhibition at Kew Palace.

==== Final work ====
Macalpine and Hunter's final major work, Psychiatry for the Poor: 1851–1973 (1974), a detailed institutional history of Colney Hatch Asylum, rejected both anti-psychiatric critiques and romantic defences of asylums. It depicted chronic underfunding and administrative neglect while reaffirming the authors' conviction that mental illness stems from physical disease processes accessible to medical investigation. Macalpine was correcting proofs and completing an index for Psychiatry for the Poor in her last days. The book was timed to appear on her 75th birthday in June 1974, which she did not live to see.

== Personal life ==
Macalpine's first marriage, to Ernst Hirschmann, lasted a few years. They had two sons, Karl (Charles) and Richard, born in 1922 and 1923, respectively. For the sake of obtaining British citizenship, she was briefly married to Frederic Handl, a friend of her sister and father of the actress Irene Handl. She was later married to George Lawson Macalpine of the Sir Alfred McAlpine & Son building firm from 1941 until his death in 1948. Upon moving to England, she and her sons anglicized their name to Hunter (Hirsch being deer in German). At her insistence, both her sons qualified as physicians, although Charles had wished to study mathematics. She was the maternal aunt of the humanitarian Nicholas Winton and double first cousin of the journalist Ella Winter.

Macalpine was tall, slender, dark-haired, and friendly-looking. Friends remembered her as determined and strong-willed, with a constant drive to improve things, a quality some associated with her Jewish background. Others described her as emotionally distant, convinced of her own correctness, and maintaining a strange relationship with her sons. She was dismayed by Charles's decision to marry and later disowned him. She then shifted all her attention to Richard, with whom she lived and worked in an open-plan apartment, the walls of which were lined from floor to ceiling with books. The British historian of medicine Roy Porter saw "psychobiographical questions of a Freudian hue" in Macalpine's relationship with her younger son.

Macalpine was formidable in debate and mastered English "to an astonishing degree". As a German refugee, she was not readily accepted into London's psychiatric establishment. She served as the vice-president of the History of Medicine Society and was elected a member of the Royal College of Physicians of London in 1959. She was admitted to the fellowship of the Royal College of Physicians only on her deathbed.

Macalpine was a heavy smoker. She was diagnosed with inoperable lung cancer in 1974 and declined chemotherapy. She died in London on 2 May 1974. The physician William Hartston described her in her obituary as calm, considerate, diligent, and precise, writing that she readily assisted others seeking guidance or information on psychiatric history. Macalpine left everything, including a library of several thousand volumes, to Richard. He married after her death. Their library is preserved at Cambridge University Library.

== Publications ==
=== Journal articles ===
- Hirschmann-Wertheimer, Ida (1927). "Über wechselseitige Beziehungen von Menstruation und Psyche" [On the reciprocal relations of menstruation and psyche]. Monatsschrift für Psychiatrie und Neurologie (in German). 66. S. Karger: 215–254. doi:10.1159/000165969.
- Macalpine, Ida (1952). "Psychosomatic symptom formation". The Lancet. 259 (6702). Elsevier BV: 278–282. doi:10.1016/s0140-6736(52)90341-3. ISSN 0140-6736.
- Macalpine, Ida; Hunter, Richard A. (1952). "Rossini: Piano Pieces For the Primal Scene". American Imago. 9 (3/4). The Johns Hopkins University Press: 213–219. ISSN 0065-860X. JSTOR 26301492.
- Macalpine, Ida (1953). "Psychiatric observations on facial dermatoses". British Journal of Dermatology. 65 (5). Oxford University Press: 177–182. doi:10.1111/j.1365-2133.1953.tb13194.x. ISSN 0007-0963. PMID 13042010.
- Macalpine, Ida (1954). "Present Status of Psychosomatic Medicine". American Journal of Psychotherapy. 8 (3). American Psychiatric Association Publishing: 454–465. doi:10.1176/appi.psychotherapy.1954.8.3.454. ISSN 0002-9564. PMID 13180751.
- Macalpine, Ida; Hunter, Richard A. (1955). "The Importance of the Concept of Transference for Present-Day Theories of Mental Disease". Acta Psychotherapeutica, Psychosomatica et Orthopaedagogica. 3 (Suppl). S. Karger AG: 237–243. doi:10.1159/000278660. ISSN 0365-5679. JSTOR 45108049. PMID 14398401.
- Macalpine, Ida (1956). "Tribute to Freud". Journal of the History of Medicine and Allied Sciences. 11 (3). Oxford University Press: 247–260. doi:10.1093/jhmas/XI.3.247. ISSN 0022-5045. JSTOR 24619387. PMID 13346071.
- Macalpine, Ida; Hunter, Richard A. (1956). "A case of true allergy established by patch testing and reported by Sir Kenelme Digby in 1645". British Journal of Dermatology. 68 (2): 61–62. doi:10.1111/j.1365-2133.1956.tb12784.x. ISSN 0007-0963. PMID 13293296.
- Hunter, Richard A.; Macalpine, D.P.M. Ida; Payne, Leonard M. (1956). "The County Register of Houses for the Reception of "Lunatics", 1798–1812". Journal of Mental Science. 102 (429). Royal College of Psychiatrists: 856–863. doi:10.1192/bjp.102.429.856. ISSN 0368-315X. PMID 13398783.
- Macalpine, Ida; Hunter, Richard A. (1957). "Rossini: Piano Pieces For the Primal Scene". Dickensian. 53 (3/4): 49–51. JSTOR 26301492.
- Hunter, Richard A.; Macalpine, Ida (1957). "William Harvey: His Neurological and Psychiatric Observations". Journal of the History of Medicine and Allied Sciences. 12 (2). Oxford University Press: 126–139. doi:10.1093/jhmas/XII.4.126. ISSN 0022-5045. JSTOR 24619408. PMID 13429048.
- Macalpine, Ida (1 June 1957). "Syphilophobia: A psychiatric study" (PDF). Sexually Transmitted Infections. 33 (2). British Medical Journal: 92–99. doi:10.1136/sti.33.2.92. ISSN 1368-4973. PMC 1047133. PMID 13446424.
- Hunter, Richard A.; Macalpine, Ida (1958). "William Harvey and Robert Boyle". Notes and Records of the Royal Society of London. 13 (2). The Royal Society: 115–127. doi:10.1098/rsnr.1958.0014. ISSN 0035-9149. JSTOR 530973.
- Macalpine, Ida (1958). "Is alopecia areata psychosomatic? A Psychiatric Study". British Journal of Dermatology. 70 (4). Oxford University Press (OUP): 117–131. doi:10.1111/j.1365-2133.1958.tb13304.x. ISSN 0007-0963. PMID 13523061.
- Hunter, Richard A.; Macalpine, Ida (1959). "An Anonymous Publication on Vaccination by John Conolly (1794-1866)". Journal of the History of Medicine and Allied Sciences. 14 (3). Oxford University Press: 311–319. doi:10.1093/jhmas/XIV.7.311. ISSN 0022-5045. JSTOR 24620886. PMID 14405464.
- Macalpine, Ida (1965). "Shakespeare In Edinburgh?". The British Medical Journal. 1 (5439). BMJ: 926. ISSN 0007-1447. JSTOR 25405222.
- Macalpine, Ida; Hunter, Richard (8 January 1966). "The "insanity" of King George 3d: a classic case of porphyria" (PDF). BMJ. 1 (5479): 65–71. doi:10.1136/bmj.1.5479.65. ISSN 0959-8138. PMID 5323262.
- Macalpine, Ida; Hunter, Richard (1 November 1967). "A Clinical Reassessment of the 'Insanity' of George III and Some of its Historical Implications". Historical Research. 40 (102). Oxford University Press (OUP): 166–185. doi:10.1111/j.1468-2281.1967.tb02147.x. ISSN 0950-3471. PMID 19606555.
- Macalpine, Ida; Hunter, Richard; Rimington, Claude (1968). "Porphyria In The Royal Houses Of Stuart, Hanover, And Prussia A Follow-Up Study Of George III'S Illness". The British Medical Journal. 1 (5583). BMJ: 7–18. ISSN 0007-1447. JSTOR 20390970.
- MacAlpine, Ida; Hunter, Richard (1968). "George III's Illness and its Impact on Psychiatry". Proceedings of the Royal Society of Medicine. 61 (10): 1017–1026. doi:10.1177/003591576806101020. ISSN 0035-9157. PMC 1902767. PMID 4878849.
- Macalpine, Ida; Hunter, Richard (1969). "Porphyria and King George III". Scientific American. 221 (1). Scientific American, a division of Nature America, Inc.: 38–49. Bibcode:1969SciAm.221a..38M. doi:10.1038/scientificamerican0769-38. ISSN 0036-8733. JSTOR 24926408. PMID 4894248.
- Hunter, Richard; MacAlpine, Ida (1972). "The Reverend John Ashbourne (C.1611-61) And The Origins Of The Private Madhouse System". The British Medical Journal. 2 (5812). BMJ: 513–515. ISSN 0007-1447. JSTOR 25418852.

=== Books ===
- Hirschmann-Wertheimer, Ida (1934). Frauenüberschuß und Geburtenrückgang [Surplus of Women and Decline in Births] (in German). P. Hartung.
- Macalpine, Ida; Hunter, Richard A.; Hunter, Richard Alfred (1956). Schizophrenia, 1677: A Psychiatric Study of an Illustrated Autobiographical Record of Demoniacal Possession. W. Dawson.
- Hunter, Richard Alfred; Macalpine, Ida (1963). Three Hundred Years of Psychiatry, 1535–1860: A History Presented in Selected English Texts. Oxford University Press.
- Macalpine, Ida; Hunter, Richard Alfred (1970). George III and the Mad-business. Pantheon Books. ISBN 978-0-7126-5279-7.
- Hunter, Richard Alfred; Macalpine, Ida (1974). Psychiatry for the Poor: 1851 Colney Hatch Asylum—Friern Hospital 1973 : a Medical and Social History. Dawsons of Pall Mall. ISBN 978-0-7129-0629-6.
