= Cloche =

Cloche (French for "bell") or la cloche (French for "the bell") may refer to:

- Armoured cloche, bell-shaped turrets of the Maginot Line
- Battement en cloche, a classical ballet movement
- Bell (instrument), especially in music directions
- Cloche (agriculture), a covering for protecting plants from cold temperatures
- Cloche (tableware), a silver dish cover
- Cloche hat, a close-fitting women's hat
- Cloche Leythal Pastalia, a character in the videogame Ar tonelico II: Melody of Metafalica

== People ==
- Antonin Cloche (died 1720), Master of the Order of Preachers from 1686 to 1720
- James de la Cloche (1644?–1669?), an alleged would-be-illegitimate son of Charles II of England
- Maurice Cloche (1907–1990), French film director and producer
- Robert Cloche de La Malmaison (died 1717), French governor of Guadeloupe

== Places ==
- La Cloche Mountains, also called La Cloche Range, mountain range in Northern Ontario, Canada
- La Cloche Provincial Park, Ontario, Canada
- Fort La Cloche, historic Hudson's Bay Company post in Northern Ontario, Canada

== See also ==
- Clochette
- La Clochette
