= Edward Shorter (historian) =

American-born Canadian historian

- Born: Edward Lazare Shorter; October 31, 1941 (age 84); Evanston, Illinois, United States
- Education: Wabash College; Harvard University
- Awards: Jason A. Hannah Medal from the Royal Society of Canada (1995, 2000)
- Scientific career
- Fields: History of psychiatry
- Institutions: University of Toronto
- Thesis: Social Change and Social Policy in Bavaria, 1800–1860 (1968)
- Website: edwardshorterauthor.com

Edward Lazare Shorter FRSC (born October 31, 1941) is an American-born Canadian historian who is Professor of Psychiatry, Professor of the History of Medicine, and Jason A. Hannah Chair in the History of Medicine in the Faculty of Medicine at the University of Toronto. His specializations are in the history of medicine and psychiatry. He is a fellow of the Royal Society of Canada.

== See also ==
- symptom pool - a collection of symptoms that people exhibit and which signal their distress to others
