= Richard A. Hunter =

British psychiatrist (1923–1981)

- Born: Richard Alfred Hirschmann; 11 November 1923; Nuremberg, Germany
- Died: 25 November 1981 (aged 58); Welwyn Garden City, UK
- Education: St Bartholomew's Hospital
- Mother: Ida Macalpine
- Medical career
- Field: Psychiatry
- Research: History of psychiatry
- Notable works: Three Hundred Years of Psychiatry (1963); George III and the Mad Business (1969); Psychiatry for the Poor: 1851–1973 (1974)

Richard Alfred Hunter (né Hirschmann; 1923–1981) was a British physician. He was born in Germany and emigrated to England as a child. He practiced as a psychiatric consultant in a number of hospitals in and near London and gave lectures in England, the United States, and Canada. He is best known for his collaboration with his mother, fellow psychiatrist Ida Macalpine, on publications about the history of psychiatry. They initially espoused Freudian principles, but came to firmly believe that mental illnesses had physiological causes. Their most significant works were Three Hundred Years of Psychiatry (1963); George III and the Mad Business (1969), in which they argued that King George III's mental derangement was caused by porphyria and not mental illness; and Psychiatry for the Poor: 1851–1973.

== Early life and education ==
Hunter was of German-Jewish origin. He was born on 11 November 1923, in Nuremberg, into a family of merchants. His parents were Ida Hirschmann-Wertheimer (later Macalpine) and Ernst Hirschmann. They divorced when he was a child. His mother, by then a physician, fled Germany with Richard and his older brother, Charles, in 1933, when the Nazis rose to power. Upon moving to England, the family anglicized their name to Hunter (Hirsch being deer in German). Hunter enrolled first at The Hall School, Hampstead, and continued his education at St Paul's School, London.

At their mother's insistence, both Charles and Richard pursued a career in medicine. As a student, Hunter earned a reputation as one of the brightest students of his cohort and was admired for his charm and reliability. Hunter qualified as MB BS from St Bartholomew's Hospital in 1946.

== Career ==
=== Practice and lectures ===
Between appointments at St Bartholomew's and the Maudsley Hospitals, Hunter served as a captain in the Royal Army Medical Corps from 1948 to 1950. He was at first attracted to surgery and served as house surgeon to Sir Geoffrey Keynes. He later turned to psychiatry, which was his mother's specialty. He worked at Napsbury and Guy's Hospitals before joining the National Hospital for Nervous Diseases (Queen Square) as a senior registrar in psychiatry in 1957. Eliot Slater initially appointed Hunter to serve as a psychotherapist, but Hunter reversed his approach and adopted the view that mental illness stems from physical disease processes. In 1960 he became physician in psychological medicine, and three years later he was appointed consultant psychiatrist at Friern and Whittington Hospitals. Hunter was able to quickly earn patients' trust and viewed mental disturbance not as a disease in itself but as a secondary effect of underlying brain dysfunction. Convinced of the importance of nursing in treatment and recovery, he consistently backed his nursing staff, who in turn held him in high regard.

Hunter became a member of the Royal College of Physicians in 1953 and was elected fellow in 1972. He served as the president of the History of Medicine Society. He was widely sought after as a lecturer. He spoke for the Faculty of the History of Medicine and Pharmacy of the Society of Apothecaries and served as visiting Trent lecturer at Duke University, North Carolina; Sloan professor at the Menninger Foundation in Topeka, Kansas; and Hannah visiting professor in Toronto. His mother attended all of his lectures and influenced his consultations. Hunter's fervour for book collecting mirrored his approach to public engagement, often manifesting as a combination of passion, assertiveness, and occasional acerbity, which sometimes provoked friction with colleagues. He was unapologetically individualistic and had little patience for those who disagreed with him.

=== Research ===
==== Influences ====
Hunter's interest in the history of medicine became apparent with the publication of a paper on William Battie in 1955. Together with his mother, also a psychiatrist, he began a thorough research into the history of psychiatry. Between 1955 and 1963, the two built up a library of several thousand volumes, unique in both depth and scope. Hunter and Macalpine published extensively on psychiatry from the 1950s onwards while also actively practicing medicine. Despite not being trained historians, they were apt scholars and skilled at uncovering new archival material. Macalpine and Hunter formed the most productive and the only mother-and-son partnership in psychiatric research and publishing.

Macalpine's work was initially strongly influenced by Sigismund Freud: among other works, she and Hunter produced overtly Freudian studies of transference and psychohistorical interpretations such as their analysis of Gioachino Rossini's music through Oedipal theory. Their later work–probably as a result of Hunter's influence–reflected a shift from psychoanalysis to object-relations theory and finally an organic and neurological model of mental illness. Macalpine and Hunter were the sole contributors in their "Dawson" series, which saw them reprint classic psychiatric texts and bring out the first English translation of Daniel Paul Schreber's Memoirs of My Nervous Illness. Here, as in their commentaries on the writings of Christoph Haizmann, they question Freud's interpretations and discuss pre-Oedipal conflicts and gender identity anxieties.

==== Major works ====
Hunter and Macalpine produced three major works. Three Hundred Years of Psychiatry (1963), a comprehensive and scholarly anthology of psychiatric texts, presents psychiatric history as a record of progress in recognizing the somatic basis of mental disorders. By 1965, Hunter and Macalpine had formulated their hypothesis that "Mad King" George III (r. 1760–1820) did not suffer from a mental illness but from porphyria, a hereditary metabolic disorder. The porphyria expert Abraham Goldberg considered their diagnosis of George III's illness reasonable but advised Macalpine and Hunter not to treat it as a proven fact. They did not heed this advice, and when they publicized their hypothesis in 1968, it sparked a widespread interest and sharp criticism from such porphyria experts as Charles Enrique Dent and Geoffrey Dean. A heated debate was led in both private correspondence and in letters published by the British Medical Journal. The epidemiologist Archie Cochrane, himself a porphyric, expressed his gratitude to Macalpine and Hunter for bringing the disorder into spotlight.

In George III and the Mad Business (1969), Macalpine and Hunter dismiss psychodynamic readings of the king's illness and portray the diagnosis of porphyria as a triumph of scientific psychiatry over speculation. They analyze the king's symptoms and argue that his ancestors Mary, Queen of Scots and King James VI and I also had porphyria. Although they discuss symptoms of porphyria in George III's descendants as well, they refrain from identifying these descendants publicly. (Note: Besides their "Patient A" and "Patient B"–descendants whose symptoms they cited as evidence of George III's porphyria– Macalpine and Hunter suspected that an uncle of Queen Elizabeth II might be porphyric. Prince William of Gloucester, son of Queen Elizabeth II's uncle Prince Henry, Duke of Gloucester, was diagnosed with porphyria in 1968. The diagnosis was made, after examination, by the prince's physician, Headley Bellringer; Professor Ishihara in Tokyo; and the dermatologist Arthur Rook. In light of William's diagnosis, Geoffrey Dean, one of the most vehement opponents of Macalpine and Hunter's hypothesis in the 1960s, commented in the 1990s that Macalpine and Hunter might have been right about George III's illness.) In the 1970s, historians embraced porphyria as the cause of George III's mental derangement.

In their final major work, Psychiatry for the Poor: 1851–1973 (1974), Hunter and Macalpine present the history of Colney Hatch Asylum (Friern Hospital), where Hunter worked as a consultant. They reject the anti-psychiatric view that mental hospitals are inherently abominable but also decline to defend Victorian psychiatric practices. For Hunter and Macalpine, the chief issues are underfunding and understaffing. They also promote their organic view of psychiatric illnesses.

== Personal life ==
Like his mother, Hunter was a heavy smoker. They lived and worked together in an open-plan London apartment, the walls of which were lined from floor to ceiling with books. Some of their acquaintances considered their relationship strange; according to Barbara Winton, daughter of Hunter's cousin Nicholas Winton, Ida Macalpine dominated and damaged both her sons. The British historian of medicine Roy Porter saw "psychobiographical questions of a Freudian hue" in Hunter's relationship with his mother. Hunter had a fierce rivalry with his brother, Charles, and never spoke to him in adulthood. Having disowned Charles after his marriage–which she thought would distract him from his intellectual calling–Macalpine left her entire estate to Richard.

Macalpine's overwhelming influence on Hunter ended with her death in 1974. Hunter's lifestyle then changed completely. He married Thea Bostick, superintendent radiographer at Queen Square, the following year and had three children. He moved from London to Essendon and enjoyed gardening and tending to his poultry; he no longer published in the history of psychiatry. He was diagnosed with pancreatic cancer and underwent a major surgery in mid-1981. He never fully recovered, dying on 25 November 1981, aged 58, at the Queen Elizabeth II Hospital in Welwyn Garden City. His library was then purchased by the Cambridge University Library.

== Publications ==
=== Journal articles ===
- Hunter, Richard A. (1952). "Acquired Hypersensitivity To Sodium P.A.S., Streptomycin, And Penicillin". The British Medical Journal. 2 (4791). BMJ: 995. ISSN 0007-1447. JSTOR 25394164.
- Macalpine, Ida; Hunter, Richard A. (1952). "Rossini: Piano Pieces For the Primal Scene". American Imago. 9 (3/4). The Johns Hopkins University Press: 213–219. ISSN 0065-860X. JSTOR 26301492.
- Macalpine, Ida; Hunter, Richard A. (1955). "The Importance of the Concept of Transference for Present-Day Theories of Mental Disease". Acta Psychotherapeutica, Psychosomatica et Orthopaedagogica. 3 (Suppl). S. Karger AG: 237–243. doi:10.1159/000278660. ISSN 0365-5679. JSTOR 45108049. PMID 14398401.
- Macalpine, Ida; Hunter, Richard A. (1956). "A case of true allergy established by patch testing and reported by Sir Kenelme Digby in 1645". British Journal of Dermatology. 68 (2): 61–62. doi:10.1111/j.1365-2133.1956.tb12784.x. ISSN 0007-0963. PMID 13293296.
- Hunter, Richard A.; Macalpine, D.P.M. Ida; Payne, Leonard M. (1956). "The County Register of Houses for the Reception of "Lunatics", 1798–1812". Journal of Mental Science. 102 (429). Royal College of Psychiatrists: 856–863. doi:10.1192/bjp.102.429.856. ISSN 0368-315X. PMID 13398783.
- Macalpine, Ida; Hunter, Richard A. (1957). "Rossini: Piano Pieces For the Primal Scene". Dickensian. 53 (3/4): 49–51. JSTOR 26301492.
- Hunter, Richard A.; Macalpine, Ida (1957). "William Harvey: His Neurological and Psychiatric Observations". Journal of the History of Medicine and Allied Sciences. 12 (2). Oxford University Press: 126–139. doi:10.1093/jhmas/XII.4.126. ISSN 0022-5045. JSTOR 24619408.
- Hunter, Richard A.; Macalpine, Ida (1958). "William Harvey and Robert Boyle". Notes and Records of the Royal Society of London. 13 (2). The Royal Society: 115–127. doi:10.1098/rsnr.1958.0014. ISSN 0035-9149. JSTOR 530973.
- Hunter, Richard A.; Macalpine, Ida (1959). "An Anonymous Publication on Vaccination by John Conolly (1794-1866)". Journal of the History of Medicine and Allied Sciences. 14 (3). Oxford University Press: 311–319. doi:10.1093/jhmas/XIV.7.311. ISSN 0022-5045. JSTOR 24620886.
- Hunter, Richard A.; Ross, Ian P. (1960). "Psychotherapy In Migraine". The British Medical Journal. 1 (5179). BMJ: 1084–1088. ISSN 0007-1447. JSTOR 25390925. PMID 14405466.
- Macalpine, Ida; Hunter, Richard (8 January 1966). "The "insanity" of King George 3d: a classic case of porphyria" (PDF). BMJ. 1 (5479): 65–71. doi:10.1136/bmj.1.5479.65. ISSN 0959-8138. PMC 1843211. PMID 5323262.
- Macalpine, Ida; Hunter, Richard (1 November 1967). "A Clinical Reassessment of the 'Insanity' of George III and Some of its Historical Implications". Historical Research. 40 (102). Oxford University Press (OUP): 166–185. doi:10.1111/j.1468-2281.1967.tb02147.x. ISSN 0950-3471. PMID 19606555.
- Macalpine, Ida; Hunter, Richard; Rimington, Claude (1968). "Porphyria In The Royal Houses Of Stuart, Hanover, And Prussia A Follow-Up Study Of George III'S Illness". The British Medical Journal. 1 (5583). BMJ: 7–18. doi:10.1136/bmj.1.5583.7. ISSN 0007-1447. JSTOR 20390970. PMC 1984936. PMID 4866084.
- MacAlpine, Ida; Hunter, Richard (1968). "George III's Illness and its Impact on Psychiatry". Proceedings of the Royal Society of Medicine. 61 (10): 1017–1026. doi:10.1177/003591576806101020. ISSN 0035-9157. PMC 1902767. PMID 4878849.
- Macalpine, Ida; Hunter, Richard (1969). "Porphyria and King George III". Scientific American. 221 (1). Scientific American, a division of Nature America, Inc.: 38–49. Bibcode:1969SciAm.221a..38M. doi:10.1038/scientificamerican0769-38. ISSN 0036-8733. JSTOR 24926408. PMID 4894248.
- Hunter, Richard; MacAlpine, Ida (1972). "The Reverend John Ashbourne (C.1611-61) And The Origins Of The Private Madhouse System". The British Medical Journal. 2 (5812). BMJ: 513–515. ISSN 0007-1447. JSTOR 25418852.

=== Books ===
- Hirschmann-Wertheimer, Ida (1934). Frauenüberschuß und Geburtenrückgang [Surplus of Women and Decline in Births] (in German). P. Hartung.
- Macalpine, Ida; Hunter, Richard A.; Hunter, Richard Alfred (1956). Schizophrenia, 1677: A Psychiatric Study of an Illustrated Autobiographical Record of Demoniacal Possession. W. Dawson.
- Hunter, Richard Alfred; Macalpine, Ida (1963). Three Hundred Years of Psychiatry, 1535–1860: A History Presented in Selected English Texts. Oxford University Press.
- Macalpine, Ida; Hunter, Richard Alfred (1970). George III and the Mad-business. Pantheon Books. ISBN 978-0-7126-5279-7.
- Hunter, Richard Alfred; Macalpine, Ida (1974). Psychiatry for the Poor: 1851 Colney Hatch Asylum—Friern Hospital 1973 : a Medical and Social History. Dawsons of Pall Mall. ISBN 978-0-7129-0629-6.
