= Van Den Driessche =

Van Den Driessche or Vandendriessche is a surname. Notable people with the surname include:

- Aurèle Vandendriessche (born 1932), Belgian long-distance runner
- Carlos Vandendriessche (1901–1972), Belgian ice hockey player and rower
- Femke Van den Driessche, Belgian cyclist
- Franky Vandendriessche (born 1971), Belgian footballer
- Gaston Vandendriessche (1924–2002), Belgian psychologist
- Johan Van den Driessche (1953–2025), Belgian politician
- Kévin Vandendriessche (born 1989), French footballer
- Kurt Vandendriessche (born 1975), Belgian actor
- Lotte Vandendriessche (born 1997), Belgian volleyball player
- Pauline van den Driessche (born 1941), British-Canadian applied mathematician
- Pol Van Den Driessche, Belgian politician
- René Van Den Driessche (born 1928), Belgian fencer
- Tom Vandendriessche (born 1978), Belgian politician
