= Gaston Vandendriessche =

Belgian psychologist

Gaston Vandendriessche (28 November 1924 – 14 October 2002) was a Belgian psychologist, best known for his extensive study on the so-called Haizmann case, first analyzed by Sigmund Freud in 1923.

Vandendriessche was born in Roeselare. He studied psychology at the University of Leuven and published his doctoral thesis, Het Haizmann-geval van Sigmund Freud: Onderzoek betreffende het grondmateriaalen de psychologische interpretaties, in 1962, and continued to research and write on the Haizmann case until the 1990s in Dutch, French, German and English language.

His best-known work is probably the book The Parapraxis in the Haizmann Case of Sigmund Freud from 1965. According to H. C. Erik Midelfort, this book is a “devastating demolition of Freud’s interpretation” but he also thinks that Vandendriessche is “careful and respectful” in his argumentation.

Vandendriessche served as a professor of psychology at the University of Leuven. He died in 2002 in Leuven, aged 77.

== Writings ==
A selection of Vandendriessche’s writings on the Haizmann case:

- 1962. Het Haizmann-geval van Sigmund Freud: Onderzoek betreffende het grondmateriaalen de psychologische interpretaties. (Unpublished dissertation.) Leuven.
- 1964. Het probleem van de dood van de vader in het Haizmann-geval van Sigmund Freud. Nederlands tijdsschrift voor de Psychologie en haar grensgebieden (vol. 19), pp. 446–467.
- 1965. The Parapraxis in the Haizmann Case of Sigmund Freud. Publications Universitaires, Louvain.
- 1975. La bisexualité dans le cas Haizmann: Un cas de possession démoniaque étudié par Freud. Revue française de Psychanalyse (vol. 39), pp. 999–1012.
- 1978. Ambivalence et anti-ambivalence dans le cas Haizmann de Freud: Le choix impossible d’un psychotique. Revue française de Psychanalyse (vol. 42), pp. 1081–1088.
- 1985–1986. Johann Christoph Haitzmann – Ein Teufelsbündler im 17. Jahrhundert. Mitteilungsblatt der Kulturverwaltung der Stadt St. Pölten, issues 11/1985, p. 43– & 12/1985, pp. 46–48 & 1/1986, p. 3–.
- 1986a. Der Teufelsbündler Johann Christoph Haitzmann. Prinz Eugen und das barocke Österreich (edited by Karl Gutkas), p. 348. Kuratorium zur Veranstaltung der Ausstellung, Wien. OCLC 310666242 Online version.
- 1986b. Johann Christoph Haitzman (1651–1700): Barocke Teufelsaustreibung in Mariazell. Welt des Barock (edited by Rupert Feuchtmüller & Elisabeth Kovács), pp. 141–145. Herder & Co., Wien. ISBN 3-210-24823-0
- 1991. Christoph Haitzman’s Paintings: An Unknown Seventeenth-Century Pictorial Codex of Diseases and Medicaments. Actes du XXXIIe Congrès International d’Histoire de la Médecine: Anvers 3–7 septembre 1990 (edited by Eric Fierens et alii), pp. 1167–1176. Societas Belgica Historiae Medicinae, Bruxelles.
