= Hypnodermatology =

Parapsychological procedure

Hypnodermatology is an informal label for the use of hypnosis in treating the skin conditions that fall between conventional medical dermatology and the mental health disciplines.

The use of hypnosis to provide relief for some skin conditions is based on observations that the severity of the disease may correlate with emotional issues. In addition, hypnotherapy has been used to suggest improvement on dermatological symptoms, such as chronic psoriasis, eczema, ichthyosis, warts and alopecia areata.

Philip D. Shenefelt, a research dermatologist at the University of South Florida School of Medicine, has identified two dozen dermatologic conditions that have shown response to hypnosis in the literature, with varying degrees of evidence. These include successful results in controlled trials on verruca vulgaris, psoriasis, and atopic dermatitis. A 2005 review in the Mayo Clinic Proceedings stated that, "A review of the use of hypnosis in dermatology supports its value for many skin conditions not believed to be under conscious control". The most comprehensively studied skin conditions in relation to hypnotherapy are psoriasis and warts. Hypnosis may have positive effects on dermatological conditions in both adults and children.

Hypnotherapy may contribute towards reducing itching and discomfort brought on by the presence of warts and improves and possibly decreasing lesions.

== See also ==
- Psychodermatology
