= Prayer of Saint Francis =

Early 20th-century Catholic prayer

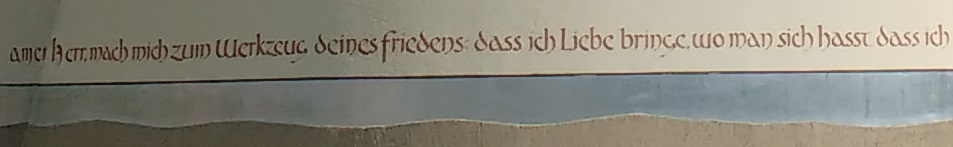
- Original title: Belle prière à faire pendant la Messe
- First published in: La Clochette
- Country: France
- Language: French
- Publisher: La Ligue de la Sainte-Messe (ed. Fr. Esther Bouquerel)
- Publication date: December 1912

The anonymous text that is usually called the Prayer of Saint Francis (or Peace Prayer, or Simple Prayer for Peace, or Make us an Instrument of Your Peace) is a widely known Christian prayer for peace. Often associated with the Italian Saint Francis of Assisi (c. 1182 – 1226), but entirely absent from his writings, the prayer in its present form has not been traced back further than 1912. Its first known occurrence was in French, in a small spiritual magazine called La Clochette (The Little Bell), published by a Catholic organization in Paris named La Ligue de la Sainte-Messe (The League of the Holy Mass). The author's name was not given, although it may have been the founder of La Ligue, Father Esther Bouquerel. The prayer was heavily publicized during both World War I and World War II. It has been frequently set to music by notable songwriters and quoted by prominent leaders, and its broadly inclusive language has found appeal with many faiths encouraging service to others.

== Text ==
In most published versions of the prayer, the text is abridged, paraphrased or copyrighted. Below is the complete original text from its earliest known publication (1912, in French, copyright expired), alongside a line-by-line English translation:

French original:
Seigneur, faites de moi un instrument de votre paix.
Là où il y a de la haine, que je mette l'amour.
Là où il y a l'offense, que je mette le pardon.
Là où il y a la discorde, que je mette l'union.
Là où il y a l'erreur, que je mette la vérité.
Là où il y a le doute, que je mette la foi.
Là où il y a le désespoir, que je mette l'espérance.
Là où il y a les ténèbres, que je mette votre lumière.
Là où il y a la tristesse, que je mette la joie.
Ô Seigneur, que je ne cherche pas tant
à être consolé qu'à consoler,
à être compris qu'à comprendre,
à être aimé qu'à aimer,
car c'est en donnant qu'on reçoit,
c'est en s'oubliant qu'on trouve,
c'est en pardonnant qu'on est pardonné,
c'est en mourant qu'on ressuscite à l'éternelle vie.

English translation:
Lord, make me an instrument of your peace.
Where there is hatred, let me bring love.
Where there is offence, let me bring pardon.
Where there is discord, let me bring union.
Where there is error, let me bring truth.
Where there is doubt, let me bring faith.
Where there is despair, let me bring hope.
Where there is darkness, let me bring your light.
Where there is sadness, let me bring joy.
O Lord, grant that I may not so much seek
to be consoled as to console,
to be understood as to understand,
to be loved as to love,
for it is in giving that one receives,
it is in self-forgetting that one finds,
it is in forgiving that one is forgiven,
it is in dying that one awakens to eternal life.

=== Possible inspirations for the prayer ===
The second half of the prayer bears a strong resemblance to this famous saying of Giles of Assisi (c. 1190 – 1262), one of Francis's closest companions:

Beatus ille qui amat, et non desiderat amari:
beatus ille qui timet, et non desiderat timeri:
beatus ille qui servit, et non desiderat sibi serviri:
beatus ille bene se gerit erga alios, et non ut alii se bene gerant erga ipsum:
et quia haec magna sunt, ideo stulti ad ea non attingunt.

Blessed is he who loves and does not therefore desire to be loved;
Blessed is he who fears and does not therefore desire to be feared;
Blessed is he who serves and does not therefore desire to be served;
Blessed is he who behaves well toward others and does not desire that others behave well toward him;
And because these are great things, the foolish do not rise to them.

This text appears in the last chapters of the famous Little Flowers of St. Francis, a text that was undergoing numerous translations at the time the modern prayer was composed. At face value Giles's verses appear to be heavily inspired by an earlier text themselves, both in structure and content, namely The Beatitudes of Jesus in Matthew 5:3-12 and Luke 6:20-26.

The first half of the prayer also bears some similarities to Veni Sancte Spiritus in both structure and content.

=== Franciscan viewpoints ===
The Franciscan Order does not include the prayer in its official "Prayers of St. Francis", and a church historian has noted that the phrasing of the first half of the text ("let me...") is atypically self-oriented for Francis:

The most painful moment usually comes when [students] discover that Saint Francis did not write the "Peace Prayer of Saint Francis"... Noble as its sentiments are, Francis would not have written such a piece, focused as it is on the self, with its constant repetition of the pronouns "I" and "me", the words "God" and "Jesus" never appearing once.

However, the prayer has been recommended by members of the Order, while not attributing it to Saint Francis.

== Musical settings ==
=== Sebastian Temple (1967) ===
"Prayer of St. Francis" (excerpt)
Composed by Sebastian Temple

The most-prominent hymn version of the prayer is "Make Me a Channel of Your Peace", or simply "Prayer of St. Francis", adapted and set to a chant-like melody in 1967 by South African songwriter Sebastian Temple (born Johann Sebastian von Tempelhoff; 1928–1997), who had become a Third Order Franciscan. The hymn is an anthem of the Royal British Legion and is usually sung at its annual Festival of Remembrance. In 1997, it was part of the Funeral of Diana, Princess of Wales, and was performed by the Irish singer Sinéad O'Connor on the Princess Diana tribute album. The hymn was also sung for the religious wedding ceremony of Prince Albert II of Monaco to South African Charlene Wittstock in 2011.

=== Others ===
Additional settings of the prayer by notable musicians include those by:

- Arthur Bliss
- Maire Brennan
- The Burns Sisters
- F. R. C. Clarke
- René Clausen
- Bing Crosby – recorded 4 November 1954 for the cause of Fr. Junípero Serra.
- Donovan
- Dream Theater
- Petr Eben
- John Foley
- Marc Jordan
- Singh Kaur
- Snatam Kaur
- Matt Maher
- Mary McDonald
- Sarah McLachlan
- A Ragamuffin Band
- John Rutter
- Patti Smith
- John Michael Talbot

== History ==
Christian Renoux, a history professor at the University of Orléans, published in French in 2001 a book-length study of the prayer and its origins, clearing up much of the confusion that had accumulated previously. The Franciscan journal Frate Francesco and the Vatican newspaper L'Osservatore Romano published articles in Italian summarizing the book's findings, and Renoux published an online abstract in English at The Franciscan Archive.

=== La Clochette (1912) ===
The earliest known record of the prayer is its appearance, as a "beautiful prayer to say during Mass", in the December 1912 issue of the small devotional French Catholic publication La Clochette, "the bulletin of the League of the Holy Mass". Although the prayer was published anonymously, Renoux concluded that, with few exceptions, the texts in La Clochette were generally written by its founding editor, Father Esther Bouquerel (1855–1923).

=== Mistaken attribution (1916) to 11th-century William the Conqueror ===
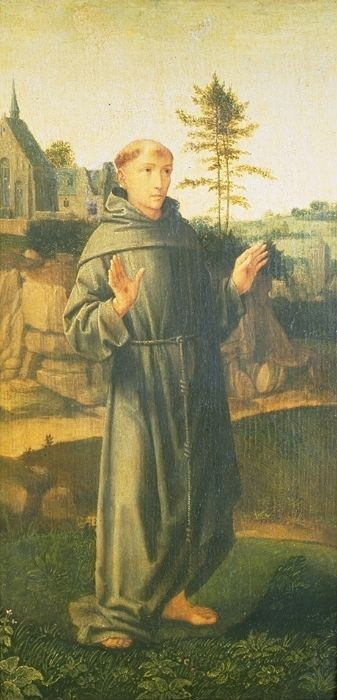
St. Francis on a painted altarpiece by Gerard David (early 1500s)

In 1915, Marquis Stanislas de La Rochethulon (1862–1945), founding president of the Anglo-French association Souvenir Normand (Norman Remembrance), which called itself "a work of peace and justice inspired by the testament of William the Conqueror, who is considered to be the ancestor of all the royal families of Europe", sent this prayer to Pope Benedict XV in the midst of World War I. The Pope had an Italian translation published on the front page of L'Osservatore Romano on 20 January 1916. It appeared under the heading, "The prayers of 'Souvenir Normand' for peace", with a jumbled explanation: "'Souvenir Normand' has sent the Holy Father the text of some prayers for peace. We have pleasure in presenting in particular the prayer addressed to the Sacred Heart, inspired by the testament of William the Conqueror." On 28 January 1916, the newspaper La Croix reprinted, in French, the article from L'Osservatore Romano, with exactly the same heading and explanation. La Rochethulon wrote to La Croix to clarify that it was not a prayer of Souvenir Normand; but he failed to mention La Clochette, the first publication in which it had appeared. Because of its appearance in L'Osservatore Romano and La Croix as a simple prayer for peace during World War I, the prayer became widely known.

=== Mistaken attribution (c. 1927) to 13th-century Saint Francis ===
Around 1918, Franciscan Father Étienne Benoît reprinted the "Prayer for Peace" in French, without attribution, on the back of a mass-produced holy card depicting his Order's founder, the inspirational peacemaker from the Crusades era, Saint Francis of Assisi. The prayer was circulating in the United States by January 1927, when its first known English version (slightly abridged from the 1912 French original) appeared in the Quaker magazine Friends' Intelligencer, under the misattributed and misspelled title "A prayer of St. Francis of Assissi". The saint's namesake American archbishop and military vicar Francis Spellman distributed millions of copies of the "Prayer of St. Francis" during World War II, and the next year it was read into the Congressional Record by Senator Albert W. Hawkes. As a friar later summarized the relationship between the prayer and St. Francis: "One can safely say that although he is not the author, it resembles him and would not have displeased him."

== Other notable invocations ==
The Prayer of St. Francis has often been cited with national or international significance, in the spirit of service to others.

=== By religious leaders ===
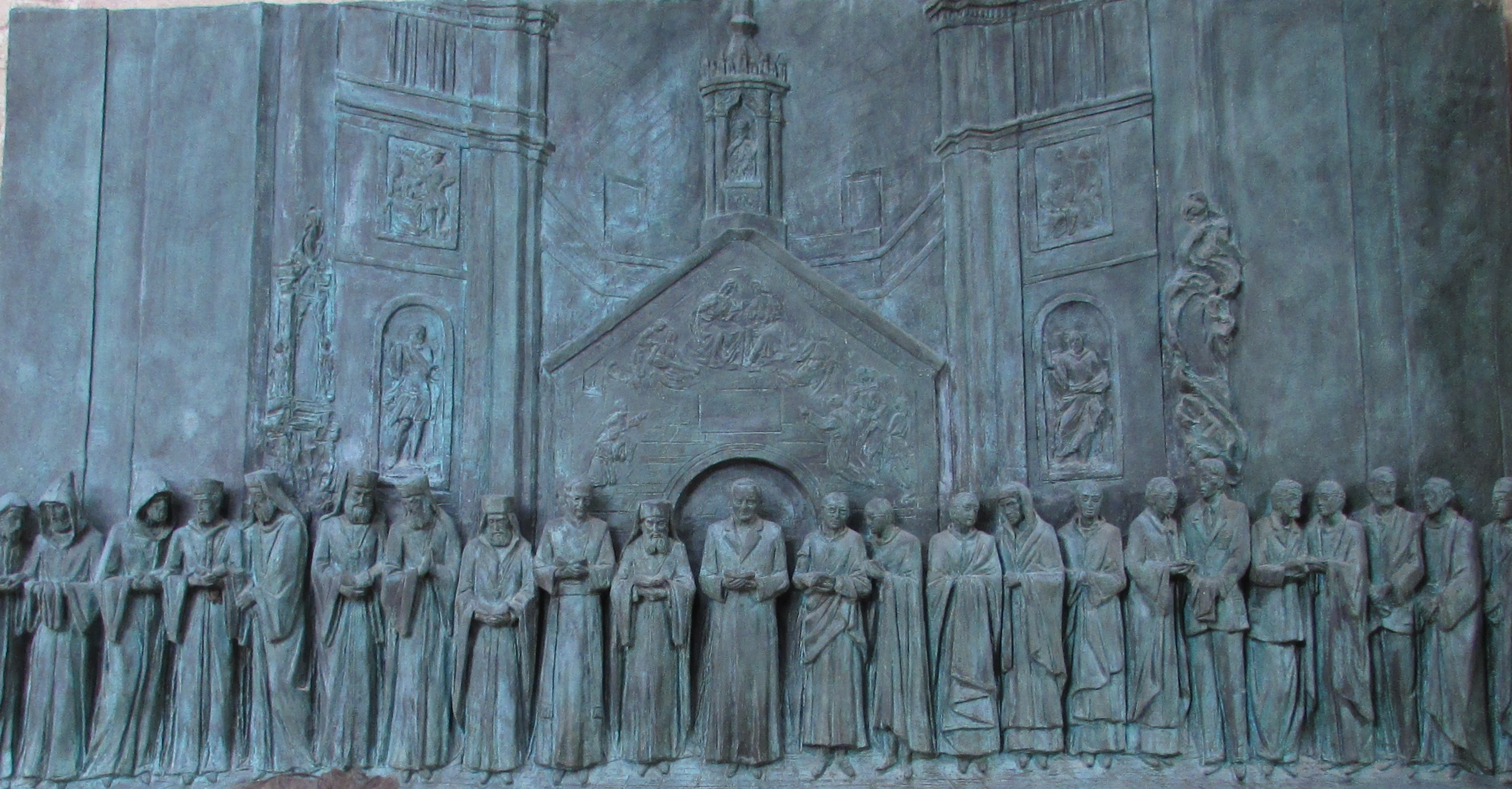
Memorial engraving of global religious leaders at the first "World Day of Prayer for Peace", in Assisi

In 1986, Pope John Paul II recited the prayer as a means of bidding farewell to the global religious leaders he hosted for the first "World Day of Prayer for Peace", in Assisi at the Basilica of St. Francis. Indeed, the prayer "over the years has gained a worldwide popularity with people of all faiths".

Mother Teresa of Calcutta (Kolkata, India) made it part of the morning prayers of the Roman Catholic religious institute she founded, the Missionaries of Charity. She attributed importance to the prayer when receiving the Nobel Peace Prize in Oslo in 1979 and asked that it be recited. It became the anthem of many Christian schools in Kolkata. South Africa's Anglican archbishop Desmond Tutu, winner of the 1984 Nobel Peace Prize for his non-violent leadership against apartheid, declared that the prayer was "an integral part" of his devotions.

=== By political leaders ===
Margaret Thatcher, after winning the 1979 general election, paraphrased the prayer on the doorstep of 10 Downing Street, surrounded by a throng of reporters, having "kissed hands" with Queen Elizabeth II and become Prime Minister.

In 1995, US President Bill Clinton quoted it in his welcoming remarks to John Paul II, starting the papal visit to address the United Nations in New York City. Nancy Pelosi quoted the prayer when she became Speaker of the US House of Representatives in 2007, as did her successor John Boehner when he resigned in 2015. Pelosi invoked it again at the opening of the evening House session following the 6 January 2021, riot and storming of the Capitol. At the 2012 Democratic Convention, Jena Nardella invoked the prayer during the closing Benediction. President-elect Joe Biden quoted the prayer during his speech following his victory in the Electoral College on 14 December 2020.

=== By others ===
The prayer is referenced in the Alcoholics Anonymous book Twelve Steps and Twelve Traditions (1953), and is often known to AA members as the "Step Eleven Prayer". An abbreviated version of the prayer was sung in Franco Zeffirelli's 1972 film about St. Francis, Brother Sun, Sister Moon. In Band of Brothers (2001), episode six "Bastogne", Eugene 'Doc' Roe recites "Lord, grant that I shall never seek so much to be consoled as to console, to be understood as to understand, or to be loved as to love with all my heart. With all my heart." while praying in a foxhole in the Bois Jacques.. In the Buffy the Vampire Slayer season 6 finale, "Grave," the musical version recorded by Canadian singer-songwriter Sarah McLachlan is featured toward the end, as the soundtrack to the episode's emotional climax.

A modified version of the prayer appears in the song "Prayer" in the musical Come From Away. Beanie Feldstein sings the prayer in the 2017 film Lady Bird, set at a Catholic girls' school. A shortened version appears in the HBO show Deadwood, episode 11, season one, and in the Showtime series The Affair, episode 8, season one. It also appears in the CBC TV series Anne with an E, episode 3, season three.

Sinéad O'Connor recorded a version for the 1997 Diana, Princess of Wales: Tribute album.

According to singer and guitarist Trey Anastasio from the American rock band Phish, recital of the Saint Francis prayer is an integral part of his pre-concert ritual.
