= La Clochette =

La Clochette (The Little Bell) was a small spiritual magazine published monthly in French from 1901 to 1919 by a Catholic Church organization in Paris named La Ligue de la Sainte-Messe (The League of the Holy Mass). Father Esther Bouquerel (1855–1923) founded the organization and edited the magazine, which had approximately 8,000 subscribers. In December 1912, the magazine published the earliest known version of an anonymous prayer for peace, now widely but erroneously called the Prayer of Saint Francis.
