= Psychodermatology =

Science of brain–skin interactions

Psychodermatology is the treatment of skin disorders using psychological and psychiatric techniques by addressing the interaction between mind and skin. Though historically there has not been strong scientific support for its practice, there is some newer evidence that behavioral treatments may be effective in the management of chronic skin disorders. The theory as a whole has not garnered enough conclusive and experimentally replicable data to support incorporation into the scientific mainstream.

The practice of psychodermatology is based on the complex interplay between neurological, immunological, cutaneous and endocrine systems, known alternatively as the NICE network, NICS, and by other similar acronyms. The interaction between nervous system, skin, and immunity has been explained by release of mediators from network. In the course of several inflammatory skin diseases and psychiatric conditions, the neuroendocrine-immune-cutaneous network is destabilized.

== Concept ==
The disorders that proponents classify as psychodermatologic fall into three general categories: psychophysiologic disorders, primary psychiatric disorders and secondary psychiatric disorders. Proponents frequently claim treatment for psoriasis, eczema, hives, genital and oral herpes, acne, warts, skin allergies, pain, burning sensations, and hair loss. Psychodermatological treatment techniques include psychotherapy, meditation, relaxation, hypnosis, acupuncture, yoga, tai chi, and anti-anxiety drugs. Additionally, cosmetics companies may offer products utilizing terms such as "psychodermatology" or "neurocosmetics" in their marketing, though these terms are not regulated.

Psychophysiologic disorders are conditions that are precipitated by or worsened by experiencing stressful emotions. These conditions are not always related to stress and in many cases respond to medication but stress can be a contributing factor in some cases.

Diagnoses Associated with Psychodermatologic Disorders
Major Categories	Examples
Psychophysiologic Disorders	Acne, alopecia areata, atopic dermatitis, psoriasis, psychogenic purpura, rosacea, seborrheic dermatitis, urticara (hives)
Primary Psychiatric Disorders	Olfactory reference syndrome, delusional parasitosis, body dysmorphic disorder, dermatitis artefacta, dermatillomania (excoriation disorder), trichotillomania
Secondary Psychiatric Disorders	Alopecia areata, cystic acne, hemangiomas, ichthyosis, kaposi’s sarcoma, psoriasis, vitiligo

== Controversy ==
A 2013 paper concluded that:

Although clinical experience is often in concordance with this notion, apparently scientific proof can sometimes be challenging rather than straightforward. Although many data have been published, it appears that not enough good statistical evidence exists to support them. The difficulty in validating beyond a doubt the stress-skin interactions has rendered some skepticism among physicians.

Harriet Hall says that the specialty may not be needed at all because medicine already takes a holistic approach to treating a patient. A 2007 review found that most dermatologists and psychologists recommend a synthesis of treatment rather than seeing another specialist.

== See also ==
- British Association of Dermatologists
- Hypnodermatology
- List of cutaneous conditions
- Pseudoscience
