= Christian Renoux =

French historian and activist

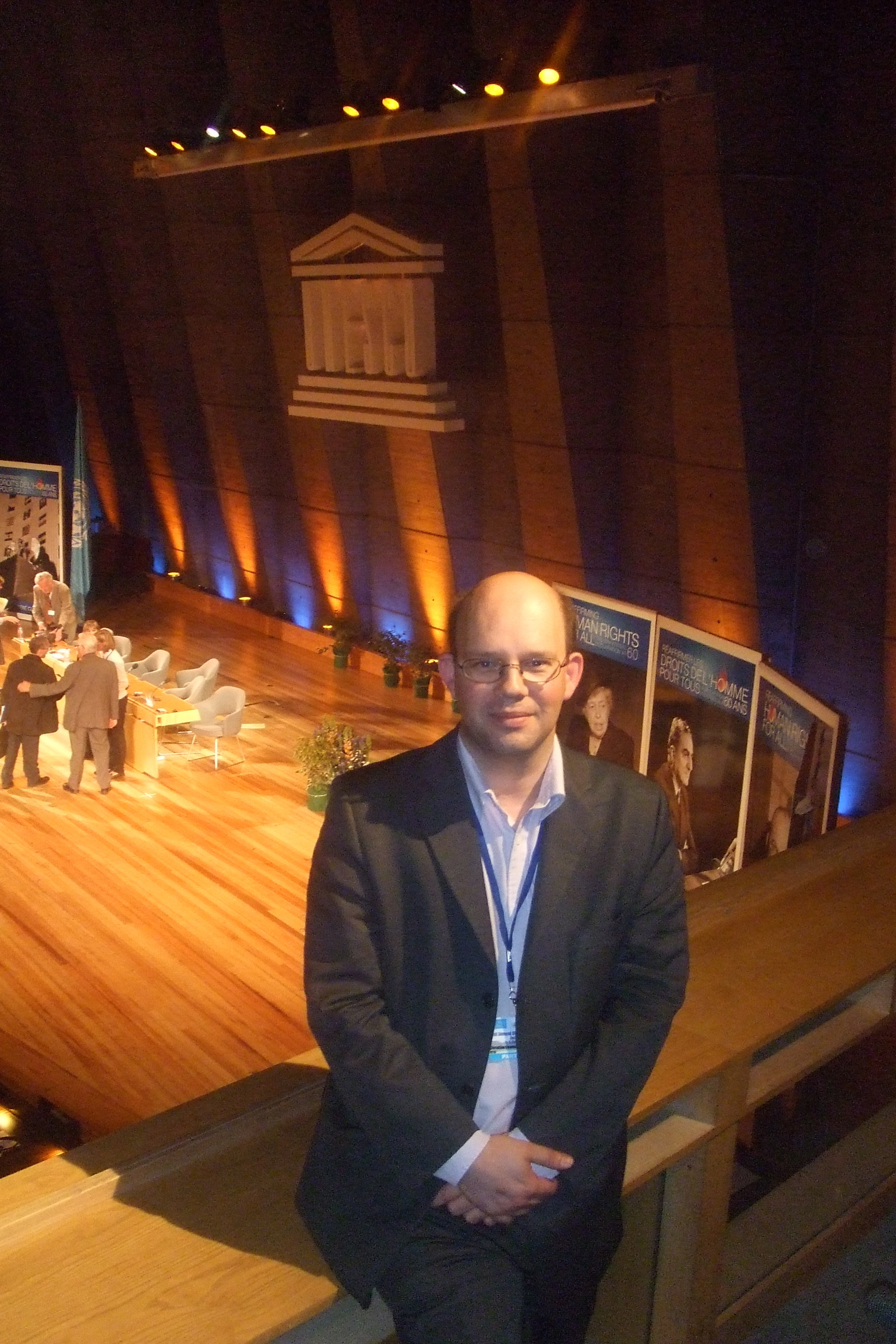
- Renoux at UNESCO (2008)
- Born: 1960 (age 65–66); Versailles, France

Academic background
- Education: École normale supérieure de Fontenay-Saint-Cloud; École française de Rome; Pantheon-Sorbonne University; Marc Bloch University

Academic work
- Discipline: History, Religion, Nonviolence
- Institutions: University of Orléans

Christian Renoux is a French historian and an activist for nonviolence.

== Education and teaching ==
Born in 1960, he is alumnus of the École normale supérieure de Fontenay-Saint-Cloud (1982), agrégé in History (1984), alumnus of the École française de Rome, the French Historical Institute of Rome (1992–1995), doctor in Early modern History of the Paris 1 Panthéon-Sorbonne University (1996) and graduated in Catholic theology from the Marc Bloch University of Strasbourg.

Since 1998, he has been associate professor of Early modern History at the University of Orléans (France), where is also teaching the History of Religions and the History of Nonviolence.

== Research ==
His research work is about the history of canonization and of sainthood in the Early Modern Times and about the history of Female Mystics in the 17th century. He is also interested in the history of demoniacal possession in the same period.

He published an history of the Peace Prayer attributed to saint Francis of Assisi ("Lord, make me an instrument of your peace"), in which he demonstrated that this text, well known as the Prayer of Saint Francis and become in half a century one of the most famous worldwide prayers, appeared, anonymously, in 1912, in France, and has been wrongly attributed to saint Francis around 1925.

== Commitments for peace and nonviolence ==
A conscientious objector, he served during his obligatory civilian service (1985–1987) at the Cahiers de la Réconciliation, magazine of the MIR, French branch of the International Fellowship of Reconciliation (IFOR). He was editor of this magazine from 1987 to 2006. He has been member of MIR France national committee since 1987 and was MIR France co-president from 1994 to 2004. He was member of IFOR Steering Committee from 1996 to 2000. He is one of its representatives at UNESCO and its treasurer (since 2018).

Since November 2000, he has been the MIR France representative to the National Committee and president of the French Coalition for the Decade for the Culture of Peace and Nonviolence (2001–2010), which became in April 2011 the Coalition for the Education for Nonviolence and Peace.

Since June 2003, he has been the representative of the French Coalition to the International Committee and president of the International Coalition for the Decade for the Culture of Peace and Nonviolence (2001–2010), which became in April 2011 the International Network for the Culture of Peace and Nonviolence.

== Book ==
- Christian Renoux, La prière pour la paix attribuée à saint François: une énigme à résoudre, Paris, Éditions franciscaines, 2001, 210 p. (in French)
- Christian Renoux, La preghiera per la pace attribuita a san Francesco. Un enigma da risolvere, Padoue, Edizioni Messagero Padova (EMP), 2003, Collana: Memoria e profezia, 180 p. (in Italian)
- Book's abstract: "The Origin of the Peace Prayer of St. Francis" (in English)
- Book's review (in Portuguese)
- Jean-Patrice Boudet, Philippe Faure et Christian Renoux, De Socrate à Tintin. Anges gardiens et démons familiers de l’Antiquité à nos jours, Rennes, Presses Universitaires de Rennes, 2011, 330 p.
- Coordination pour l'éducation à la non-violence et à la paix, Vincent Roussel [dir] and Christian Renoux [foreword], 100 questions-réponses pour éduquer à la non-violence, Lyon, Chronique sociale, 2011, 231 p.
- Philippe Castagnetti, Christian Renoux [dir.], Culture et société au miroir des procès de canonisation (XVI^{e}-XX^{e} siècle), Saint-Etienne, Presses universitaires de Saint-Etienne, 2016, 194 p.
- Aude Bonord, Christian Renoux [dir.], François d'Assise, un poète dans la cité. Variations franciscaines en France (XIX^{e}-XX^{e} siècles, Paris, Classique Garnier, 2019, 243 p.
- Philippe Castagnetti, Christian Renoux [dir.], Sources hagiographiques et procès de canonisation. Les circulations textuelles autour du culte des saints, XVI^{e}-XX^{e} siècle, Paris, Classique Garnier, 2022, 418 p.
- Laure Depretto, Christian Renoux, Christophe Speroni et Gabriele Vickermann-Ribémont [dir.], Cultures du secret à l'époque moderne. Raisons, espaces, paradoxes, fabriques, Paris, Classiques Garnier, coll. Polen, 2023, 376 p

== Articles on line ==
- « Une source de l'histoire de la mystique moderne revisitée : les procès de canonisation », in Mélanges de l'École française de Rome. Italie et Méditerranée, 1993, vol. 105, n° 105-1, p. 177–217.
- « Discerner la sainteté des mystiques. Quelques exemples italiens de l'âge baroque », in Rives nord-méditerranéennes, n° 3, 1999, p. 19–28.
- « Madame Acarie lit Thérèse d'Avila », October 2001.
- « Freud et l'affaire Haizmann », in Psychoanalytische Perspectieven, 2002, t. 20, 2, p. 309–325.
- « Cultivons la paix », interview for the Secours Catholique / Caritas France, June 2004.
- « Décennie de la non-violence et de la paix, quels objectifs pour 2010 ? », in Non-Violence Actualité, n° 285, March–April 2006.
- « La paix, invitée de La Villette », interview for L'Humanité, June 1 2006.

== Interview on line ==
- « Peut-on éduquer à la paix ? », documentary – 2006 – 26 mn. The television program Question d'Église from Jour du Seigneur on French national Channel France 2, presents the second International Salon for Peace Initiatives, which took place in Paris in June 2006 (13,000 participants) (in French)
- Interview on Radio Ethic to present the 3rd Salon in May–June 2008 (in French)
