= List of Georgian European Film Award winners and nominees =

This is a list of Georgian European Film Award winners and nominees. This list details the performances of Georgian actors, actresses, and films that have either been submitted or nominated for, or have won, a European Film Award.

== Main categories ==
Year	Award	Recipient	Status	Note
1988	Special Aspect Award	Sergei Parajanov for Art Direction in Ashik Kerib	Won	Sarkis Hovsepi Parajaniants Georgian-born with Armenian descent
2000	Best Screenwriter	Nana Djordjadze; Svereva Djordjadze for 27 Missing Kisses	Nominated	
2006	European Discovery of the Year	13 Tzameti	Won	Georgian-French co-production
2009	European Discovery	The Other Bank	Nominated	Georgian-Kazakh co-production

== See also ==
- List of Georgian submissions for the Academy Award for Best Foreign Language Film
