= European Film Award for Best Production Designer =

Annual award given for cinematic achievements in production design

- Country: Europe
- Presented by: European Film Academy
- First award: 1990
- Currently held by: Laia Ateca – Sirāt (2025)
- Website: europeanfilmawards.eu

European Film Award for Best Production Designer is an award category in the European Film Awards. The category was first presented in 1990 being award to both art directors and costume designers. At the 1st European Film Awards in 1988, two art directors were nominated Special Aspect Award with Georgi Aleksi-Meskhishvili, Niko Sanukeli and Schota Gogolaschwili winning the award for Ashik Kerib.

Though the category was not presented from 2006 to 2009, four production designers received nominations for special awards with Pierre Pell and Stéphane Rozenbaum winning the Award for an Artistic Contribution for The Science of Sleep in 2006 and Uli Hanisch receiving the Prix d'Excellence for Perfume: The Story of a Murderer in 2007. A set of nominees was presented in 2005 and from 2010 to 2012, since 2013 only a winner is presented without nominees.

== Winners and nominees ==
The winners are in a yellow background and in bold.

=== 1980s ===
Year	Production designer(s)	English title	Original title
1988 (1st)	Special Aspect Award		
1988 (1st)	**Georgi Aleksi-Meskhishvili,** **Niko Sanukeli, and** **Schota Gogolaschwili**	**Ashik Kerib**	**აშიკ-ქერიბი**
1988 (1st)	(Spain) Félix Murcia	Women on the Verge of a Nervous Breakdown	Mujeres al borde de un ataque de nervios

=== 1990s ===
Year	Production designer(s)	English title	Original title	Ref.
1990 (3rd)	**Ezio Frigerio and** **Franca Squarciapino**	**Cyrano de Bergerac**		
1990 (3rd)	Yuri Pashigoryev	Freeze Die Come to Life	Замри, умри, воскресни!	
1990 (3rd)	Ben Van Os, Jan Roelfs, and Jean Paul Gaultier	The Cook, the Thief, His Wife & Her Lover		
1991 (4th)	**Miljen Kljaković and** **Valerie Pozzo Di Borgo**	**Delicatessen**		
1992 (5th)	**Rikke Jelier**	**The Northerners**	**De Noorderlingen**	

=== 2000s ===
Year	Production designer(s)	English title	Original title	Ref.
2005 (18th)	**Aline Bonetto**	**A Very Long Engagement**	**Un long dimanche de fiançailles**	
2005 (18th)	Peter Grant	Manderlay		
2005 (18th)	Jana Karen	Sophie Scholl – The Final Days	Sophie Scholl – Die letzten Tage	
2006 (19th)	European Film Academy Award For An Artistic Contribution			
2006 (19th)	**Pierre Pell and Stéphane Rozenbaum**	**The Science of Sleep**	**La science des rêves**	
2007 (20th)	Prix d'Excellence			
2007 (20th)	**Uli Hanisch**	**Perfume: The Story of a Murderer**		
2008 (21st)	Nomination for Prix d'Excellence			
2008 (21st)	Márton Ágh	Delta		

=== 2010s ===
Year	Production designer(s)	English title	Original title	Ref.
2010 (23rd)	**Albrecht Konrad**	**The Ghost Writer**		
2010 (23rd)	Paola Bizzarri and Luis Ramirez	I, Don Giovanni	Io, Don Giovanni	
2010 (23rd)	Markku Pätilä and Jaagup Roomet	The Temptation of St. Tony	Püha Tõnu kiusamine	
2011 (24th)	**Jette Lehmann**	**Melancholia**		
2011 (24th)	Paola Bizzarri	We Have a Pope	Habemus Papam	
2011 (24th)	Antxón Gómez	The Skin I Live In	La piel que habito	
2012 (25th)	**Maria Djurkovic**	**Tinker Tailor Soldier Spy**		
2012 (25th)	Niels Sejer	A Royal Affair	En kongelig affære	
2012 (25th)	Elena Zhukova	Faust	Фауст	
2013 (26th)	**Sarah Greenwood**	**Anna Karenina**		
2014 (27th)	**Claus-Rudolf Amler**	**The Dark Valley**	**Das finstere Tal**	
2015 (28th)	**Sylvie Olivé**	**The Brand New Testament**	**Le Tout Nouveau Testament**	
2016 (29th)	**Alice Normington**	**Suffragette**		
2017 (30th)	**Josefin Åsberg**	**The Square**		
2018 (31st)	**Andrey Ponkratov**	**Summer**	**Лето Leto**	
2019 (32nd)	**Antxon Gómez**	**Pain and Glory**	**Dolor y gloria**	

=== 2020s ===
Year	Production designer(s)	English title	Original title	Ref.
2020 (33rd)	**Cristina Casali**	**The Personal History of David Copperfield**		
2021 (34th)	**Márton Ágh**	**Natural Light**	**Természetes fény**	
2022 (35th)	**Jim Clay**	**Belfast**		
2023 (36th)	**Emita Frigato**	**La chimera**		
2024 (37th)	**Jagna Dobesz**	**The Girl with the Needle**	**Pigen med nålen**	
2025 (38th)	**Laia Ateca**	**Sirāt**		
2025 (38th)	James Price	Bugonia		
2025 (38th)	Jørgen Stangebye Larsen	Sentimental Value	Affeksjonsverdi	
2026 (39th)	Marcel Sławiński and Katarzyna Sobańska	Fatherland		
2026 (39th)	Roger Bellés	La bola negra		
2026 (39th)	Olivier Meidinger	Rose		

== See also ==
- Academy Award for Best Production Design
- BAFTA Award for Best Production Design
- César Award for Best Production Design
- Goya Award for Best Art Direction
