= List of Soviet European Film Award winners and nominees =

This is a list of Soviet European Film Award winners and nominees. This list details the performances of Bosnian actors, actresses, and films that have either been submitted or nominated for, or have won, a European Film Award.

== Main categories ==
Year	Award	Recipient	Status	Note
1988	Special Aspect Award	Sergei Parajanov for Art Direction in Ashik Kerib	Won	
1988	Special Jury Award	Jurij Chanin for music in The Days of Eclipse	Won	
1988	Best Director	Sergei Parajanov for Ashik Kerib	Nominated	
1988	European Discovery of the Year	Days of Eclipse	Nominated	
1989	Best Film	Little Vera	Nominated	
1989	Best Director	Vasili Pichul for Little Vera	Nominated	
1989	Best Actress	Natalya Negoda for Little Vera	Nominated	
1990	European Cinema Society Special Award	Association of Filmmakers of the USSR	Won	
1990	Best Film	Mother	Nominated	
1990	European Discovery of the Year	Lie Still – Die - Revive	Nominated	
1992	European Discovery of the Year	Three Days	Nominated	

== See also ==
- List of Soviet submissions for the Academy Award for Best Foreign Language Film
