= 38th European Film Awards =

2026 awards ceremony

- Date: 17 January 2026
- Site: Haus der Kulturen der Welt, Berlin, Germany
- Organized by: European Film Academy
- Official website: europeanfilmawards.eu

Highlights
- Best Picture: Sentimental Value
- Best Direction: Joachim Trier; Sentimental Value
- Best Actor: Stellan Skarsgård; Sentimental Value
- Best Actress: Renate Reinsve; Sentimental Value
- Most awards: Sentimental Value (6)
- Most nominations: Sirāt (9)

The 38th European Film Awards, presented by the European Film Academy to recognize achievements in European filmmaking, took place at the Haus der Kulturen der Welt in Berlin on 17 January 2026.

Mark Cousins curated the award ceremony along with the musical concept incharge German composer Dascha Dauenhauer, and the German stage director Robert Lehniger, who also oversaw the award ceremony.

Sentimental Value swept the top award categories.

== Selection ==
=== Feature Film ===
The selection of feature films was announced on 14 October 2025.

- Bearcave – Krysianna B. Papadakis, Stergios Dinopoulos (Greece, United Kingdom)
- Bugonia – Yorgos Lanthimos (United Kingdom, United States, South Korea)
- Case 137 – Dominik Moll (France)
- Christy – Brendan Cantry (Ireland, United Kingdom)
- Deaf – Eva Libertad (Spain)
- Die My Love – Lynne Ramsay (United Kingdom, United States, Canada)
- Dreams (Sex Love) – Dag Johan Haugerud (Norway)
- Duse – Pietro Marcello (Italy, France)
- Father – Tereza Nvotová (Slovakia, Czechia, Poland)
- Franz – Agnieszka Holland (Czechia, Germany, Poland)
- Fuori – Mario Martone (Italy, France)
- I Only Rest in the Storm – Pedro Pinho (Portugal, France, Brazil, Romania)
- It Was Just an Accident – Jafar Panahi (France, Iran, Luxembourg)
- La grazia – Paolo Sorrentino (Italy)
- The Last Viking – Anders Thomas Jensen (Denmark, Sweden)
- Late Shift – Petra Volpe (Switzerland, Germany)
- The Little Sister – Hafsia Herzi (France, Germany)
- Little Trouble Girls – Urška Djukic (Slovenia, Italy, Croatia, Serbia)
- Love Me Tender – Anna Cazenave Cambet (France)
- The Love That Remains – Hlynur Pálmason (Iceland, Denmark, Sweden, France)
- Loveable – Lilja Ingolfsdottir (Norway)
- Maspalomas – Jose Mari Goenaga, Aitor Arregi (Spain)
- Milk Teeth – Mihai Mincan (Romania, France, Denmark, Greece, Bulgaria)
- Mirrors No. 3 – Christian Petzold (Germany)
- Mother – Teona Strugar Mitevska (North Macedonia, Belgium)
- The North – Bart Schrijver (the Netherlands)
- On Falling – Laura Carreira (United Kingdom, Portugal)
- Once Upon a Time in Gaza – Tarzan and Arab Nasser (France, Palestine, Germany, Portugal, Qatar, Jordan)
- One of Those Days When Hemme Dies – Murat Fıratoğlu (Turkey, Germany)
- Palestine 36 – Annemarie Jacir (Palestine, United Kingdom, France, Denmark, Norway)
- Pillion – Harry Lighton (United Kingdom)
- Romería – Carla Simón (Spain, Germany)
- Sentimental Value – Joachim Trier (Norway, France, Denmark, Germany, Sweden)
- Silent Friend – Ildikó Enyedi (Germany, France, Hungary)
- Sirāt – Oliver Laxe (Spain, France)
- Sleepless City – Guillermo Galoe (Spain, France)
- Sound of Falling – Mascha Schilinski (Germany)
- The Stranger – François Ozon (France)
- Sundays – Alauda Ruiz de Azúa (Spain)
- Two Prosecutors – Sergei Loznitsa (France, Germany, the Netherlands, Latvia, Romania, Lithuania)
- The Voice of Hind Rajab – Kaouther Ben Hania (France, Tunisia)
- What Marielle Knows – Frédéric Hambalek (Germany)
- Yes – Nadav Lapid (France, Israel, Cyprus, Germany)
- Young Mothers – Jean-Pierre Dardenne & Luc Dardenne (Belgium, France)

=== Documentary ===
The selection of 15 documentary films was announced on 14 October 2025.

- Afternoons of Solitude – Albert Serra (Spain, France)
- An American Pastoral – Auberi Edler (France)
- Ancestral Visions of the Future – Lemohang Jeremiah Mosese (France, Lesotho, Germany, Qatar, Saudi Arabia)
- Fiume o morte! – Igor Bezinović (Croatia, Slovenia, Italy)
- Flophouse America – Monica Strømdahl (Norway, Netherlands, United States)
- Good Valley Stories – José Luis Guerin (Spain, France)
- Hair, Paper, Water... – Nicolas Graux, Minh Quý Trương (Belgium, France, Vietnam)
- Listen to the Voices – Maxime Jean-Baptiste (Belgium, France)
- Memory – Vladlena Sandu (France, Netherlands)
- Militantropos – Yelizaveta Smith, Alina Gorlova, Simon Mozgovyi (Ukraine, Austria, France)
- Riefenstahl – Andres Veiel (Germany)
- Songs of Slow Burning Earth – Olha Zhurba (Ukraine, France, Denmark, Sweden)
- The Shards – Masha Chernaya (Georgia, Germany)
- TWST / Things We Said Today – Andrei Ujică (France, Romania)
- With Hasan in Gaza – Kamal Aljafari (Germany)

=== Animation ===
The selection of 8 animated feature films was announced on 14 October 2025.

- Arco – Ugo Bienvenu (France)
- Balentes – Giovanni Columbu (Italy, Germany)
- Checkered Ninja 3 – Anders Matthesen, Thorbjørn Christoffersen (Denmark)
- Dandelion's Odyssey – Momoko Seto (France)
- Dog of God – Raitis Abele, Lauris Abele (Latvia, United States)
- Little Amélie or the Character of Rain – Maïlys Vallade & LianeCho Han (France)
- Olivia and the Invisible Earthquake – Irene Iborra Rizo (Spain, France, Belgium, Switzerland, Chile)
- Tales from the Magic Garden – David Súkup, Patrik Pašš, Leon Vidmar, Jean-Claude Rozec (Czechia, Slovakia, Slovenia, France)

== Winners and nominees ==
The nominees for European Short Film – Prix Vimeo were announced on 31 October 2025. The nominations were announced on 18 November 2025 at the Alcázar of Seville, following the 22nd Seville European Film Festival. The nominations in Excellence categories were announced on 26 November 2025.

=== European Film ===
| English title | Original title | Director(s) | Producer(s) |
|---|---|---|---|
| Sentimental Value | Affeksjonsverdi | (Norway) Joachim Trier | Maria Ekerhovd, Andrea Ottmar, Nathanaël Karmitz, Juliette Schrameck, Sisse Graum Jørgensen, Lizette Jonjic, Janine Jackowski, Jonas Dornbach, Lars Thomas Skare, Atilla Yücer |
| It Was Just an Accident | یک تصادف ساده | (Iran) Jafar Panahi | Philippe Martin, Jafar Panahi, Christel Hénon, Sandrine Dumas |
| Sirāt | | (France) (Spain) Oliver Laxe | Domingo Corral, Oliver Laxe, Xavi Font, Pedro Almodóvar, Agustín Almodóvar, Esther García, Oriol Maymó, Mani Mortazavi, Andrea Queralt |
| Sound of Falling | In die Sonne schauen | (Germany) Mascha Schilinski | Maren Schmitt, Lucas Schmidt, Lasse Scharpen |
| The Voice of Hind Rajab | صوت هند رجب | (Tunisia) Kaouther Ben Hania | Nadim Cheikhrouha, Odessa Rae, James Wilson |
Films nominated for European Documentary and European Animated Feature Film were also considered as candidates for the category of European Film.

=== European Director ===
| Director(s) | English title | Original title |
|---|---|---|
| (Norway) Joachim Trier | Sentimental Value | Affeksjonsverdi |
| (Greece) Yorgos Lanthimos | Bugonia | |
| (France) (Spain) Oliver Laxe | Sirāt | |
| (Iran) Jafar Panahi | It Was Just an Accident | یک تصادف ساده |
| (Germany) Mascha Schilinski | Sound of Falling | In die Sonne schauen |

=== European Screenwriter ===
| Screenwriter(s) | English title | Original title |
|---|---|---|
| (Norway) Eskil Vogt (Norway) Joachim Trier | Sentimental Value | Affeksjonsverdi |
| (Argentina) Santiago Fillol (France) (Spain) Oliver Laxe | Sirāt | |
| (Iran) Jafar Panahi | It Was Just an Accident | یک تصادف ساده |
| (Germany) Mascha Schilinski (Germany) Louise Peter | Sound of Falling | In die Sonne schauen |
| (Italy) Paolo Sorrentino | La grazia | |

=== European Actor ===
| Actor | English title | Original title |
|---|---|---|
| (Sweden) Stellan Skarsgård | Sentimental Value | Affeksjonsverdi |
| (Spain) Sergi López | Sirāt | Sirāt |
| (Denmark) Mads Mikkelsen | The Last Viking | Den sidste viking |
| (Italy) Toni Servillo | La grazia | La grazia |
| (Germany) Idan Weiss | Franz | Franz |

=== European Actress ===
| Actress | English title | Original title |
|---|---|---|
| (Norway) Renate Reinsve | Sentimental Value | Affeksjonsverdi |
| (Germany) Leonie Benesch | Late Shift | Heldin |
| (Italy) (France) Valeria Bruni Tedeschi | Duse | Duse |
| (France) Léa Drucker | Case 137 | Dossier 137 |
| (Luxembourg) Vicky Krieps | Love Me Tender | Love Me Tender |

=== European Documentary ===
| English title | Original title | Director(s) | Country |
|---|---|---|---|
| Fiume o morte! | | (Croatia) Igor Bezinović | Croatia, Italy, Slovenia |
| Afternoons of Solitude | Tardes de soledad | (Spain) Albert Serra | France, Spain |
| Riefenstahl | | (Germany) Andres Veiel | Germany |
| Songs of Slow Burning Earth | | (Ukraine) Olha Zhurba | Denmark, France, Sweden, Ukraine |
| With Hasan in Gaza | مع حسن في غزّة | (Palestine) Kamal Aljafari | Germany |

=== European Animated Feature Film ===
| English title | Original title | Director(s) | Country |
|---|---|---|---|
| Arco | | (France) Ugo Bienvenu | France, United States |
| Dog of God | Dieva suns | (Latvia) Lauris Ābele (Latvia) Raitis Ābele | Latvia, United States |
| Little Amélie or the Character of Rain | Amélie et la métaphysique des tubes | (France) Liane-Cho Han (France) Maïlys Vallade | Belgium, France |
| Olivia and the Invisible Earthquake | L'Olívia i el terratrèmol invisible | (Spain) Irene Iborra Rizo | Belgium, Chile, France, Spain, Switzerland |
| Tales from the Magic Garden | Pohádky po babičce | (Slovakia) Patrik Pašš (France) Jean-Claude Rozec (Czech Republic) David Súkup (Slovenia) Leon Vidmar | Czechia, France, Slovakia, Slovenia |

=== European Discovery – Prix FIPRESCI ===
| English title | Original title | Director(s) | Country |
|---|---|---|---|
| On Falling | | (Portugal) Laura Carreira | Portugal, United Kingdom |
| Little Trouble Girls | Kaj ti je deklica | (Slovenia) Urška Djukić | Croatia, Italy, Serbia, Slovenia |
| My Father's Shadow | | (Nigeria) (United Kingdom) Akinola Davies Jr. | Nigeria, United Kingdom |
| One of Those Days When Hemme Dies | Hemme’nin Öldüğü Günlerden Biri | (Turkey) Murat Fıratoğlu | Germany, Turkey |
| Sauna | | (Denmark) Mathias Broe | Denmark |
| Under the Grey Sky | Pod szarym niebem | (Belarus) (Poland) Mara Tamkovich | Poland |

=== European Young Audience Award ===
| English title | Original title | Director(s) | Country |
|---|---|---|---|
| Siblings | La vita da grandi | (Italy) Greta Scarano | Italy |
| Arco | | (France) Ugo Bienvenu | France, United States |
| I Accidentally Wrote a Book | Véletlenül írtam egy könyvet | (Hungary) Nóra Lakos | Hungary, Netherlands |

=== European Short Film – Prix Vimeo ===
| Title | Director(s) | Country |
|---|---|---|
| City of Poets | (Iran) (Netherlands) Sara Rajaei | Netherlands |
| Being John Smith | (United Kingdom) John Smith | United Kingdom |
| L'Avance | (France) Djiby Kebe | France |
| Man Number 4 | (United Kingdom) Miranda Pennell | United Kingdom |
| The Flowers Stand Silently, Witnessing | (Greece) Theo Panagopoulos | United Kingdom |

=== Excellence Awards ===
==== European Casting Director ====
| Casting director(s) | English title | Original title |
|---|---|---|
| (France) Nadia Acimi (Spain) Luís Bértolo (Spain) María Rodrigo | Sirāt | |
| (Norway) Yngvill Kolset Haga (United States) Avy Kaufman | Sentimental Value | Affeksjonsverdi |
| (Germany) Karimah El-Giamal (Germany) Jacqueline Rietz | Sound of Falling | In die Sonne schauen |

==== European Cinematographer ====
| Cinematographer(s) | English title | Original title |
|---|---|---|
| (Spain) Mauro Herce | Sirāt | |
| (Germany) Fabian Gamper | Sound of Falling | In die Sonne schauen |
| (Belgium) Manu Dacosse | The Stranger | L'Étranger |

==== European Editor ====
| Editor(s) | English title | Original title |
|---|---|---|
| (Spain) Cristóbal Fernández | Sirāt | |
| (Greece) Yorgos Mavropsaridis | Bugonia | |
| (Germany) Toni Froschhammer | Die My Love | |

==== European Production Designer ====
| Production designer(s) | English title | Original title |
|---|---|---|
| (Andorra) (Spain) Laia Ateca | Sirāt | |
| (United Kingdom) James Price | Bugonia | |
| (Norway) Jørgen Stangebye Larsen | Sentimental Value | Affeksjonsverdi |

==== European Costume Designer ====
| Costume designer(s) | English title | Original title |
|---|---|---|
| (Germany) Sabrina Krämer | Sound of Falling | In die Sonne schauen |
| (Germany) (Italy) Ursula Patzak | Duse | |
| (Czech Republic) Michaela Horáčková Hořejší | Franz | |

==== European Make-up & Hair Artist ====
| Make-up and hair artist(s) | English title | Original title |
|---|---|---|
| (Germany) Torsten Witte | Bugonia | |
| (Czech Republic) Gabriela Poláková | Franz | |
| (Germany) Irina Schwarz (Germany) Anne-Marie Walther | Sound of Falling | In die Sonne schauen |

==== European Composer (Original Score) ====
| Composer(s) | English title | Original title |
|---|---|---|
| (Poland) Hania Rani | Sentimental Value | Affeksjonsverdi |
| (United Kingdom) Jerskin Fendrix | Bugonia | |
| (Germany) Michael Fiedler (Germany) Eike Hosenfeld | Sound of Falling | In die Sonne schauen |

==== European Sound Designer ====
| Sound designer(s) | English title | Original title |
|---|---|---|
| (Spain) Yasmina Praderas (Spain) Amanda Villavieja (Spain) Laia Casanovas | Sirāt | |
| (United Kingdom) Johnnie Burn | Bugonia | |
| (Tunisia) Amal Attia (France) Elias Boughedir (Germany) Lars Ginzel (France) Gwennolé Le Borgne (France) Marion Papinot | The Voice of Hind Rajab | صوت هند رجب |

=== Films with multiple nominations and awards ===
Films with multiple nominations
| Nominations | Film |
|---|---|
| 9 | Sirāt |
| 8 | Sentimental Value |
| 8 | Sound of Falling |
| 6 | Bugonia |
| 3 | Franz |
| 3 | It Was Just an Accident |
| 2 | Arco |
| 2 | Duse |
| 2 | La grazia |
| 2 | The Voice of Hind Rajab |

Films with multiple awards
| Awards | Film |
|---|---|
| 6 | Sentimental Value |
| 5 | Sirāt |

== Honorary Awards ==
| EFA Lifetime Achievement Award | European Achievement in World Cinema | Eurimages International Co-Production Award |
|---|---|---|
| (Norway) Liv Ullmann | (Italy) Alice Rohrwacher | (Germany) Maren Ade (Germany) Jonas Dornbach (Germany) Janine Jackowski |

== Special awards ==
=== Lux European Audience Film Award 2026 ===
The LUX Audience Award, presented by the European Parliament and the European Film Academy in partnership with the European Commission and Europa Cinemas, recognizes films that raise awareness about current social and political issues in Europe. The prize was awarded to Eva Libertad's Deaf at a ceremony in Brussels on 14 April 2026.

| English title | Original title | Director(s) | Country |
|---|---|---|---|
| Deaf | Sorda | (Spain) Eva Libertad | Spain |
| Christy | | (Republic of Ireland) Brendan Canty | UK, Ireland |
| It Was Just an Accident | یک تصادف ساده | (Iran) Jafar Panahi | Iran, France, Luxemburg |
| Love Me Tender | | (France) Anna Cazenave Cambet | France |
| Sentimental Value | Affeksjonsverdi | (Norway) Joachim Trier | Norway, Denmark, Sweden, Germany, France |
