= 29th European Film Awards =

2016 film awards ceremony in Poland

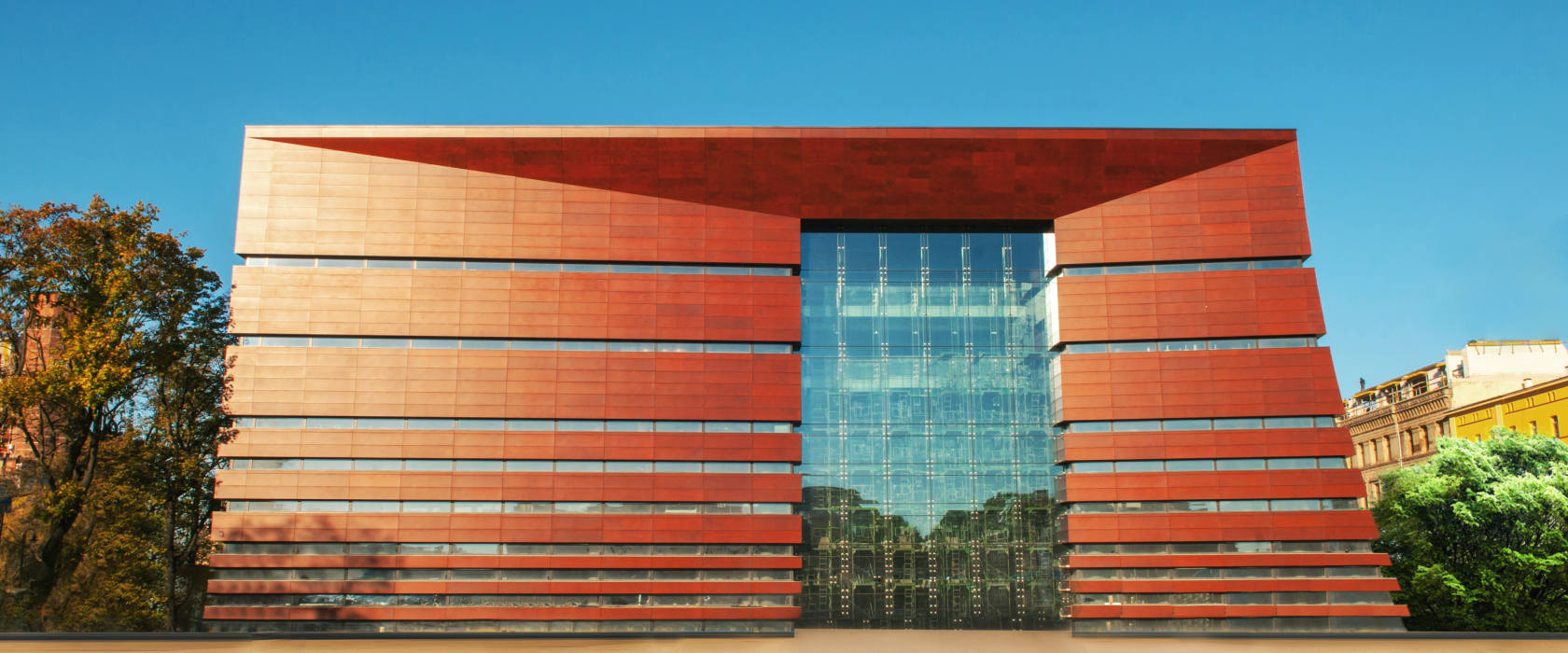
- Narodowe Forum Muzyki
- Date: 10 December 2016
- Site: National Forum of Music, Wrocław, Lower Silesia, Poland
- Hosted by: Maciej Stuhr
- Organized by: European Film Academy

Highlights
- Best Picture: Toni Erdmann
- Best Direction: Maren Ade; Toni Erdmann
- Best Actor: Peter Simonischek; Toni Erdmann
- Best Actress: Sandra Hüller; Toni Erdmann
- Most awards: Toni Erdmann (5/6), Land of Mine (4/4)
- Most nominations: Toni Erdmann (6), I, Daniel Blake (6)

Television coverage
- Channel: Arte, TVN, NTV Plus, HBO Europe, RAI Movie, Movistar+, Cosmote TV, Curzon Home Cinema, 15 min, LTV, ETV+

The 29th European Film Awards were presented on 10 December 2016 in Wrocław, Poland. The ceremony is one of a number of events to take place in Wrocław as the city is a 2016 European Capital of Culture, along with San Sebastián. The nominations and winners were selected by more than 2,500 members of the European Film Academy.

== Ceremony ==
The ceremony focused on a political message against ongoing nationalism and euroscepticism. The European Film Academy also remarked on Ukrainian filmmaker Oleh Sentsov, who is imprisoned in Russia.

== Selection ==
- 24 Weeks
- A Man Called Ove
- A War
- Being 17
- Beyond the Mountains and Hills
- Chevalier
- Dawn
- Death in Sarajevo
- Don't Be Bad
- Elle
- Florence Foster Jenkins
- Frenzy
- Graduation
- I, Daniel Blake
- I, Olga Hepnarová
- Julieta
- Kills on Wheels
- Köpek
- Land of Mine
- Letters from War
- Like Crazy
- Lost in Munich
- Mammal
- Mimosas
- On the Other Side
- One of Us
- Perfect Strangers
- Pyromaniac
- Rauf
- Room
- Sieranevada
- Song of Songs
- Sparrows
- Strange Haven
- Suffragette
- Suntan
- The Ardennes
- The Commune
- The Happiest Day in the Life of Olli Mäki
- The Lure
- The Olive Tree
- The Paradise Suite
- The People vs. Fritz Bauer
- The Student
- The Unknown Girl
- Things to Come
- Tikkun
- Toni Erdmann
- Truman
- United States of Love

== Awards voted by EFA Members ==
=== Best Film ===
The nominees were announced on 6 November 2016 in Seville, Spain at the Seville European Film Festival. Four films nominated for Best Film were premiered at the Cannes Film Festival, including the Palme d’Or winner I, Daniel Blake, and FIPRESCI Critics Award Toni Erdmann. One film (Room) has been already nominated for the Best Picture at the 88th Academy Awards. Three films (Toni Erdmann, Elle, Julieta) had been submitted for Best Foreign Language Film at the 89th Academy Awards. Two films (I, Daniel Blake, Toni Erdmann) received nominations at the 18th British Independent Film Awards.

Toni Erdmann is the first film directed by a woman to win best picture.

English title	Director(s)	Producer(s)	Production companies	Country	Language
Toni Erdmann	Maren Ade	Maren Ade, Jonas Dornbach, Janine Jackowski, Michael Merkt	Komplizen Film, Coop99, KNM, Missing Link Films, SWR, WDR, Arte, MonkeyBoy	(Germany) (Austria)	German, English, Romanian
Elle	Paul Verhoeven	Saïd Ben Saïd, Michel Merkt	SBS Productions, Pallas Film, France 2 Cinéma, Entre Chien et Loup, Canal+, France Télévisions, Orange Cinéma Séries, Casa Kafka Pictures, Proximus, Centre National de la Cinématographie, Filmförderungsanstalt	(France) (Germany) (Belgium)	French
I, Daniel Blake	Ken Loach	Rebecca O'Brien	Sixteen Films, Why Not Productions, Wild Bunch, Entertainment One, Les Films du Fleuve, Canal+, Ciné+, BE TV, British Film Institute, BBC, France 2, France Télévisions, Le Pacte, VOO	(United Kingdom) (France)	English
Julieta	Pedro Almodóvar	Agustín Almodóvar, Pedro Almodóvar, Esther García	El Deseo, Canal+ France, Ciné +, Televisión Española	(Spain)	Spanish
Room	Lenny Abrahamson	Ed Guiney, David Gross	Telefilm Canada, Filmnation Entertainment, Irish Film Board, Element Pictures, No Trace Camping, Film4	(Republic of Ireland) (Canada)	English

=== Best Comedy ===
The nominees were announced on 25 October 2016.

English title	Director(s)	Producer(s)	Production companies	Country	Language
A Man Called Ove	Hannes Holm	Annica Bellander, Nicklas Wikström Nicastro	Tre Vänner	(Sweden)	Swedish
Look Who's Back	David Wnendt	Lars Dittrich, Christopher Müller	Mythos Film	(Germany)	German
One Man and His Cow	Mohamed Hamidi	Nicolas Duval-Adassovsky, Laurent Zeitoun, Yann Zenou	Quad Productions	(France) (Algeria)	French, Arabic

=== Best Director ===
The nominees were announced on 6 November 2016

Director(s)	English title
(Germany) Maren Ade	Toni Erdmann
(Spain) Pedro Almodóvar	Julieta
(United Kingdom) Ken Loach	I, Daniel Blake
(Romania) Cristian Mungiu	Graduation
(Netherlands) Paul Verhoeven	Elle

=== Best Screenwriter ===
The nominees were announced on 6 November 2016

Director(s)	English title
(Germany) Maren Ade	Toni Erdmann
(United Kingdom) Paul Laverty	I, Daniel Blake
(Republic of Ireland) (Canada) Emma Donoghue	Room
(Romania) Cristian Mungiu	Graduation
(Poland) Tomasz Wasilewski	United States of Love

=== Best Actress ===
The nominees were announced on 6 November 2016

Actress	English title	Role
(Germany) Sandra Hüller	Toni Erdmann	Ines Conradi
(Italy) Valeria Bruni Tedeschi	Like Crazy	Beatrice Morandini Valdirana
(Denmark) Trine Dyrholm	The Commune	Anna
(France) Isabelle Huppert	Elle	Michèle Leblanc
(Spain) Emma Suárez	Julieta	Julieta
(Spain) Adriana Ugarte	Julieta	younger Julieta

=== Best Actor ===
The nominees were announced on 6 November 2016.

Actor	English title	Role
(Austria) Peter Simonischek	Toni Erdmann	Winfried Conradi / Toni Erdmann
(Spain) Javier Cámara	Truman	Tomás
(United Kingdom) Hugh Grant	Florence Foster Jenkins	St. Clair Bayfield
(United Kingdom) Dave Johns	I, Daniel Blake	Daniel Blake
(Germany) Burghart Klaußner	The People vs. Fritz Bauer	Fritz Bauer
(Sweden) Rolf Lassgård	A Man Called Ove	Ove

== Technical awards ==
A special seven-member jury convened in Berlin and, based on the selection list. The members of the jury were:

- Benoît Barouh, production designer, France
- Paco Delgado, costume designer, Spain
- Martin Gschlacht, cinematographer, Austria
- Dean Humphreys, sound designer, UK
- Era Lapid, editor, Israel
- Waldemar Pokromski, make-up artist, Poland
- Giuliano Taviani, composer, Italy.

=== Best Composer ===
The winners were announced on 17 November 2016.

Winner(s)	English title
(Russia) Ilya Demutsky	The Student

=== Best Cinematographer ===
The winners were announced on 17 November 2016.

Winner(s)	English title
(Denmark) Camilla Hjelm Knudsen	Land of Mine

=== Best Editor ===
The winners were announced on 17 November 2016.

English title	Winner(s)
(Germany) Stefanie Bieker	Land of Mine

=== Best Production Designer ===
The winners were announced on 17 November 2016.

Winner(s)	English title
(United Kingdom) Alice Normington	Suffragette

=== Best Costume Designer ===
The winners were announced on 17 November 2016.

English title	Winner(s)
(Germany) Stefanie Bieker	Land of Mine

=== Best Sound Designer ===
The winners were announced on 17 November 2016.

Winner(s)	English title
(Poland) Radosław Ochnio	11 Minutes

=== Best Makeup and Hairstyling ===
The winners were announced on 17 November 2016.

Winner(s)	English title
(Germany) Barbara Kreuzer	Land of Mine

== Critics Award ==
=== European Discovery ===
The nominees were announced on 19 September 2016. Award given by International Federation of Film Critics - Prix FIPRESCI.

English title	Director(s)	Producer(s)	Production companies	Country	Language
The Happiest Day in the Life of Olli Mäki	Juho Kuosmanen	Juho Kuosmanen	Aamu Filmcompany, ONE TWO Films, Tre Vänner Produktion AB, Elokuvayhtiö Oy Aamu, Film Väst, Tre Vänner Produktion AB	(Finland) (Germany) (Sweden)	Finnish, English
Dogs	Bogdan Mirica	Marcela Ursu	42 km Film, EZ Films	(Romania) (Bulgaria) (France) (Qatar)	Romanian
Liebmann	Jules Herrmann	Jules Herrmann	Ester.Reglin.Film Produktionsgesellschaft	(Germany)	French, German, English
Sand Storm	Elite Zexer	Haim Mecklberg, Estee Yacov-Mecklberg	2-Team Productions, Rotor Film Babelsberg	(Israel)	Arabic
Thirst	Svetla Tsotsorkova	Svetla Tsotsorkova, Nadejda Koseva	Front Film	(Bulgaria)	Bulgarian

== Best Animated Feature Film ==
The nominees were announced on 25 October 2016. Two films nominated for Best Animated Feature Film were premiered at the Cannes Film Festival. One film (My Life as a Courgette) has been submitted for Best Foreign Language Film at the 89th Academy Awards. My Life as a Courgette also in official selection for The European Parliament's LUX Prize.

English title	Director(s)	Animator(s)	Producer(s)	Production companies	Country	Language
My Life as a Courgette	Claude Barras	Kim Keukeleire	Armelle Glorennec, Éric Jacquot, Marc Bonny	Gebeka Films, Rita Productions, Blue Spirit Animation, KNM	(Switzerland) (France)	French
Psyconauts, the Forgotten Children	Alberto Vázquez, Pedro Rivero	Krhis Cembe	Farruco Castroman, Carlos Juarez, Luis Tosar	Basque Films	(Spain)	Spanish
The Red Turtle	Michaël Dudok de Wit	Michaël Dudok de Wit	Vincent Maraval	Why Not Productions, Wild Bunch, Studio Ghibli, CN4 Productions, Arte France Cinéma, Belvision	(France) (Belgium)	None

== Audience awards ==
=== People's Choice Award ===
The nominees were announced on 1 September 2016.

English title	Director(s)	Production country
Body	Małgorzata Szumowska	(Poland)
A Man Called Ove	Hannes Holm	(Sweden) (Norway)
A War	Tobias Lindholm	(Denmark)
Aferim!	Radu Jude	(Romania) (Bulgaria) (Czech Republic)
Fire at Sea	Gianfranco Rosi	(Italy) (France)
Julieta	Pedro Almodóvar	(Spain)
Mustang	Deniz Gamze Ergüven	(France) (Germany) (Turkey)
Spectre	Sam Mendes	(United Kingdom)
The Brand New Testament	Jaco Van Dormael	(Belgium) (France) (Luxembourg)
The Danish Girl	Tom Hooper	(United Kingdom)
The High Sun	Dalibor Matanić	(Croatia) , (Slovenia) (Serbia)
The Lobster	Yorgos Lanthimos	(United Kingdom) (Republic of Ireland) (Greece) (France) (Netherlands)

=== Best Children and Family Film ===
The winners were announced on 10 May 2016.

English title	Director(s)	Producer(s)	Production companies	Country	Language
Miss Impossible	Emilie Deleuze	Tatiana Bouchain	Ad Vitam Production, Agat Films & Cie	(France)	French
Girls Lost	Alexandra-Therese Keining	Ellinor Lingvall	Götafilm	(Sweden) (Finland)	Swedish
Rauf	Soner Caner, Baris Kaya	Ali Ozgur Ates, Soner Caner, Baris Kaya, Kazim Ugur Kizilaslan, Selman Kizilaslan, Burak Ozan	Peri Istanbul, Aslan Film	(Turkey)	Turkish, Kurdish

=== University Award ===
The announcement of the five European University Film Award nominations took place during Filmfest Hamburg on 5 October 2016. Films were selected by: Feo Aladag (director/Germany), Dagmar Brunow (academic, Linnaeus University/Sweden), Luis Martinez Lopez (journalist, EL MUNDO/Spain), Myroslav Slaboshpytskiy (director/Ukraine) and Patrick Sobelman (producer/France). Five nominated films were screened and discussed in the respective classes and each university voted its favourite film. The following 13 universities from 13 European countries participated:

- Czech Republic: Charles University/Prague
- France: Université Sorbonne Nouvelle Paris 3
- Germany: University of Rostock
- Greece: University of the Aegean/Mytilini (Lesbos)
- Hungary: Pázmány Péter Catholic University/Budapest
- Ireland: University College Cork
- Italy: University of Udine
- Netherlands: Utrecht University
- Poland: University of Lodz
- Portugal: University of Lisbon
- Sweden: Linnaeus University/Växjö
- Turkey: Kadir Has University/Istanbul
- United Kingdom: John Moores University/Liverpool

English title	Director(s)	Producer(s)	Production companies	Country	Language
I, Daniel Blake	Ken Loach	Rebecca O'Brien	Sixteen Films, Why Not Productions, Wild Bunch, Entertainment One, Les Films du Fleuve, Canal+, Ciné+, BE TV, British Film Institute, BBC, France 2, France Télévisions, Le Pacte, VOO	(United Kingdom) (France)	English
Graduation	Cristian Mungiu	Cristian Mungiu	Les Films du Fleuve, Mobra Films, Romanian Film Board, Why Not Productions	(Romania) (France) (Belgium)	Romanian
The Happiest Day in the Life of Olli Mäki	Juho Kuosmanen	Juho Kuosmanen	Aamu Filmcompany, ONE TWO Films, Tre Vänner Produktion AB, Elokuvayhtiö Oy Aamu, Film Väst, Tre Vänner Produktion AB	(Finland) (Germany) (Sweden)	Finnish, English
Fire at Sea	Gianfranco Rosi	Gianfranco Rosi, Paolo Del Brocco, Donatella Palermo	Stemal Entertainment, 21 Unofilm, Cinecittà Luce, Rai Cinema, Les Films d'Ici, Arte France Cinéma, Ministero per i Beni e le Attività Culturali	(Italy) (France)	Italian
Toni Erdmann	Maren Ade	Maren Ade, Jonas Dornbach, Janine Jackowski, Michael Merkt	Komplizen Film, Coop99, KNM, Missing Link Films, SWR, WDR, Arte, MonkeyBoy	(Germany) (Austria)	German, English, Romanian

== Best Documentary ==
English title	Director(s)	Producer(s)	Production companies	Country	Language
Fire at Sea	Gianfranco Rosi	Gianfranco Rosi, Paolo Del Brocco, Donatella Palermo	Stemal Entertainment, 21 Unofilm, Cinecittà Luce, Rai Cinema, Les Films d'Ici, Arte France Cinéma, Ministero per i Beni e le Attività Culturali	(Italy) (France)	Italian
21 X New York	Piotr Stasik	Agnieszka Wasiak	Lava Films	(Poland)	English, Chinese
A Family Affair	Tom Fassaert	Wout Conijn	Conijn Film	(Netherlands) (Belgium) (Denmark) (South Africa)	Dutch, English
Mr. Gaga	Tomer Heymann	Barak Heymann, Diana Holtzberg	Heymann Brothers Films, ZDF, ARTE, AVROTROS, SVT	(Israel) (Sweden) (Germany) (Netherlands)	Hebrew, English
S Is for Stanley	Alex Infascelli	Inti Carboni, Federica Paniccia, Alex Infascelli, Lorenzo Foschi, Davide Lucchetti	Kinethica, Lock & Valentine	(Italy)	English, Italian
The Land of the Enlightened	Pieter-Jan De Pue	Bart van Langendonck	Savage Film, Fastnet Films, Gebrueder Beetz Filmproduktion, Submarine, ZDF, Arte, Canvas, IKON, Eyeworks, Prime, Sciapode	(Belgium) (Republic of Ireland) (Netherlands) (Germany) (Afghanistan)	Persian, English

== Best Short Film ==
To be considered for a nomination, a short film has to screen in competition at any of the participating festivals:

- 13 - 24 Oct. 2015: Film Fest Gent (Belgium)
- 19 - 25 Oct. 2015: Uppsala International Short Film Festival (Sweden)
- 24 - 31 October 2015: Valladolid International Film Festival (Spain)
- 6 - 15 Nov. 2015: Cork Film Festival (Ireland)
- 27 Jan. - 7 Feb. 2016: International Film Festival Rotterdam (the Netherlands)
- 5 - 13 Feb. 2016: International Short Film Festival Clermont-Ferrand (France)
- 11 - 21 Feb. 2016: Berlin International Film Festival (Germany)
- 9 - 13 Mar. 2016: Tampere Film Festival (Finland)
- 29 May - 5 Jun. 2016: Kraków Film Festival (Poland)
- 9 - 17 Jul 2016: Curtas Vila do Conde - International Film Festival/ (Portugal)
- 3 - 13 Aug. 2016: Festival del film Locarno (Switzerland)
- 12 - 20 Aug. 2016: Sarajevo Film Festival (Bosnia & Herzegovina)
- 31 Aug. - 10 Sep. 2016: Venice Film Festival (Italy)
- 19 - 24 Sep. 2016: International Short Film Festival in Drama (Greece)
- 20 - 25 Sep. 2016: Encounters Short Film and Animation Festival Bristol (UK)

English title	Original title	Director(s)	Type	Minutes	Production country	Language(s)	Festival
9 days: From My Window in Aleppo	-	Thomas Vroege, Floor van der Meulen, Issa Touma	documentary	13 min.	(Netherlands) (Syria)	Arabic	Bristol
The Wall	Le mur	Samuel Lampaert	fiction	8 min	(Belgium)	Chinese	Ghent
Edmond	-	Nina Gantz	animation	10 min.	(United Kingdom)	English	Uppsala
The Goodbye	El adiós	Clara Roquet	fiction	15 min.	(Spain) (United States)	Spanish	Valladolid
90 Degrees North	90 Grad Nord	Detsky Graffam	fiction	21 min.	(Germany)	German	Cork
We All Love the Seashore	Tout le monde aime le bord de la mer	Keina Espiñeira	fiction/documentary	18 min.	(Spain)	Spanish	Rotterdam
In the Distance	-	Florian Grolig	animation	7 min.	(Germany)	-	Clermont-Ferrand
A Man Returned	-	Mahdi Fleifel	documentary	30 min.	(United Kingdom) (Denmark) (Netherlands) (Lebanon)	Arabic	Berlin
Small Talk	-	Even Hafnor, Lisa Brooke Hansen	fiction	21 min.	(Norway)	Norwegian	Tampere
I'm Not From Here	Yo no soy de aquí	Maite Alberdi, Giedrė Žickytė	documentary	26 min.	(Chile) (Denmark) (Lithuania)	Spanish, Basque	Kraków
Home	-	Daniel Mulloy	fiction	20 min.	(Kosovo) (United Kingdom) (Albania)	English	Vila do Conde
The Fullness of Time (Romance)	L'immense retour	Manon Coubia	fiction	14 min.	(Belgium) (Belgium)	French	Locarno
Limbo	-	Konstantina Kotzamani	fiction	30 min.	(Greece) (France)	Greek	Sarajevo
Amalimbo	-	Juan Pablo Libossart	animation	15 min.	(Sweden) (Estonia)	Swedish	Venice
Shooting Star	Падаща звезда	Lyubo Yonchev	fiction	28 min.	(Bulgaria) (Italy)	Bulgarian	Drama

== European Co-Production Award — Prix Eurimages ==
The winners were announced on 15 November 2016.

Recipient	Occupation
(Netherlands) Leontine Petit	Producer

== Honorary Awards ==
=== European Achievement in World Cinema ===
The winner were announced on 1 November 2016. Award presented by Susanne Bier.

Recipient	Occupation
(Republic of Ireland) Pierce Brosnan	Actor and producer

=== Lifetime Achievement Award ===
The winner were announced on 13 September 2016.

Recipient	Occupation
(France) Jean-Claude Carrière	Novelist, screenwriter, actor

=== Honorary Award of the EFA President and Board ===
Award presented by Wim Wenders.

Recipient	Occupation
(Poland) Andrzej Wajda posthumously	Director, Teacher, Founder of Wajda Film School

== List of partners ==
The European Film Awards 2016 are presented by the European Film Academy and EFA Productions in co-operation with:

- the European Capital of Culture Wrocław 2016, supported by its founders
  - the Ministry of Culture and National Heritage of the Republic of Poland
  - and the Polish Film Institute,
  - the National Forum of Music as co-organizer
- and KGHM Polska Miedź S.A. as strategic partner;

and with the support of:

- the Creative Europe MEDIA Sub-Programme of the European Union,
- FFA German Federal Film Board,
- German State Minister for Culture and the Media,
- LOTTO Foundation Berlin,
- Medienboard Berlin-Brandenburg,
- Aveda,
- Euronews,
- Fair Spirits presented by DV-V,
- Filmweb,
- GLS,
- Jägermeister,
- M∙A∙C,
- Mercedes-Benz Duda-Cars,
- Nespresso,
- TVN
- and Volvo.
