= European Film Award for Best Editor =

Annual award given for cinematic achievements in editing

- Country: Europe
- Presented by: European Film Academy
- First award: 1991
- Currently held by: Cristóbal Fernández – Sirāt (2025)
- Website: europeanfilmawards.eu

European Film Award for Best Editor is an award category within the European Film Awards. The European Film Awards are presented annually by the European Film Academy to recognize excellence in European cinematic achievements. The awards are given in over ten categories, the most important of which is the European Film. The awards are restricted to European cinema and European producers, directors, and actors.

The award was first presented in 1991 being received by Giancarla Simoncelli for Ultrà. A set of nominees was presented in 2005 and from 2010 to 2012, since 2013 only a winner is announced without nominees. Though the award was not given from 2006 to 2009, three editors received nominations for the Award of Excellence.

== Winners and nominees ==
=== 1990s ===
Year	Editor(s)	English title	Original title
1991 (4th)	Giancarla Simoncelli	Ultrà	
1992 (5th)	Nelly Quettier	The Lovers on the Bridge	Les Amants du Pont-Neuf

=== 2000s ===
Year	Editor(s)	English title	Original title	Ref.
2005 (18th)	Michael Hudecek and Nadine Muse	Hidden	Caché	
2005 (18th)	Peter Przygodda and Oli Weiss	Don't Come Knocking		
2005 (18th)	Hervé Schneid	A Very Long Engagement	Un long dimanche de fiançailles	
2007 (20th)	Nomination for Award of Excellence			
2007 (20th)	Lucia Zucchetti	The Queen		
2008 (21st)	Nomination for Award of Excellence			
2008 (21st)	Laurence Briaud	A Christmas Tale	Un conte de Noël	
2009 (22nd)	Nomination for Award of Excellence			
2009 (22nd)	Francesca Calvelli	Vincere		

=== 2010s ===
Year	Editor(s)	English title	Original title	Ref.
2010 (23rd)	Luc Barnier and Marion Monnier	Carlos		
2010 (23rd)	Arik Lahav-Leibovich	Lebanon	לבנון	
2010 (23rd)	Hervé de Luze	The Ghost Writer		
2011 (24th)	Tariq Anwar	The King's Speech		
2011 (24th)	Mathilde Bonnefoy	Three	Drei	
2011 (24th)	Molly Malene Stensgaard	Melancholia		
2012 (25th)	Joe Walker	Shame		
2012 (25th)	Anne Østerud and Janus Billeskov Jansen	The Hunt	Jagten	
2012 (25th)	Roberto Perpignani	Caesar Must Die	Cesare deve morire	
2013 (26th)	Cristiano Travaglioli	The Great Beauty	La grande bellezza	
2014 (27th)	Justine Wright	Locke		
2015 (28th)	Jacek Drosio	Body	Ciało	
2016 (29th)	Anne Østerud and Janus Billeskov Jansen	The Commune	Kollektivet	
2017 (30th)	Robin Campillo	BPM (Beats per Minute)	120 battements par minute	
2018 (31st)	Jarosław Kamiński	Cold War	Zimna wojna	
2019 (32nd)	Yorgos Mavropsaridis	The Favourite		

=== 2020s ===
Year	Editor(s)	English title	Original title	Ref.
2020 (33rd)	Maria Fantastica Valmori	Once More Unto the Breach	Il varco	
2021 (34th)	Mukharam Kabulova	Unclenching the Fists	Разжимая кулаки	
2022 (35th)	Özcan Vardar and Eytan İpeker	Burning Days	Kurak Günler	
2023 (36th)	Laurent Sénéchal	Anatomy of a Fall	Anatomie d'une chute	
2024 (37th)	Juliette Welfling	Emilia Pérez		
2025 (38th)	Cristóbal Fernández	Sirāt		
2025 (38th)	Yorgos Mavropsaridis	Bugonia		
2025 (38th)	Toni Froschhammer	Die My Love		
2026 (39th)	Paweł Pawlikowski and Piotr Wójcik	Fatherland		
2026 (39th)	Alberto Gutiérrez	La bola negra		
2026 (39th)	Gesa Jäger	Yellow Letters	Gelbe Briefe	

== See also ==
- Academy Award for Best Film Editing
- BAFTA Award for Best Editing
- César Award for Best Editing
- David di Donatello for Best Editing
- Golden Horse Award for Best Film Editing
- Goya Award for Best Editing
