= Once More Unto the Breach (film) =

2019 film

- Film poster
- Italian: Il Varco
- Directed by: Federico Ferrone, Michele Manzolini
- Written by: Federico Ferrone, Michele Manzolini, Wu Ming 2
- Produced by: Claudio Giapponesi
- Cinematography: Andrea Vaccari
- Edited by: Maria Fantastica Valmori
- Music by: Simonluca Laitempergher
- Release date: 2019 (Venice Film Festival)
- Running time: 70 minutes
- Country: Italy
- Languages: Italian, Russian

Once More Unto the Breach (Italian: Il varco, lit. 'The Gate') is a fiction film created with archive materials shot during World War II. The film's premiere took place during the 76th Venice Film Festival. In 2020, the film editor Maria Fantastica Valmori won the award for best editing at the European Film Awards.

== Plot ==
World War II, 1941. Nazi Germany invades the USSR. Its most faithful ally, Fascist Italy, also sends its first troops to the Ukrainian front. An unknown soldier is one of them. Unlike most of his comrades in arms, he has known the frontline, the bombings and the massacres of war before. And he is scared.

== Reception ==
- 2019 Annecy Italian Film Festival: Special Mention of the jury.
- 2020 Docs Barcelona: "What the Doc" award.
- 2020 33rd European Film Awards - Documentary shortlist
- 2020 European Film Award for Best Editor
