= European Film Award for Best Costume Designer =

Annual award given for cinematic achievements in costume design

- Country: Europe
- Presented by: European Film Academy
- First award: 2013
- Currently held by: (Germany) Sabrina Krämer – Sound of Falling (2025)
- Website: europeanfilmawards.eu

European Film Award for Best Costume Designer has been awarded annually by the European Film Academy. The category was first presented in 2013 with only one winner announced without nominees. From 1990 to 1992, costume designers were recognized with production designers in the Best Production Designer category, Franca Squarciapino received the award with Ezio Frigerio for Cyrano de Bergerac in 1990 while Valerie Pozzo Di Borgo won alongside Miljen Kreka Kljakovic for Delicatessen in 1991.

Though the category was not presented prior to 2013, three costume designers received nominations for the Prix d'Excellence Award with Magdalena Biedrzycka winning the award for her work in Katyń in 2008.

== Winners and nominees ==
The winners are in a yellow background and in bold.

=== 2000s ===
Year	Costume designer(s)	English title	Original title	Ref.
2007 (20th)	Nomination for Prix d'Excellence			
2007 (20th)	Francesca Sartori	Alatriste		
2008 (21st)	Prix d'Excellence			
2008 (21st)	**Magdalena Biedrzycka**	**Katyń**		
2009 (22nd)	Nomination for Prix d'Excellence			
2009 (22nd)	Catherine Leterrier	Coco Before Chanel	Coco avant Chanel	

=== 2010s ===
Year	Costume designer(s)	English title	Original title	Ref.
2013 (26th)	Paco Delgado	Blancanieves		
2014 (27th)	Natascha Curtius-Noss	The Dark Valley	**Das finstere Tal**	
2015 (28th)	Sarah Blenkinsop	The Lobster		
2016 (29th)	Stefanie Bieker	Land of Mine	**Under sandet**	
2017 (30th)	Katarzyna Lewińska	Spoor	**Pokot**	
2018 (31st)	Massimo Cantini Parrini	Dogman		
2019 (32nd)	Sandy Powell	The Favourite		

=== 2020s ===
Year	Costume designer(s)	English title	Original title	Ref.
2020 (33rd)	**Ursula Patzak**	**Hidden Away**	**Volevo nascondermi**	
2021 (34th)	**Michael O'Connor**	**Ammonite**		
2022 (35th)	**Charlotte Walter**	**Belfast**		
2023 (36th)	**Kicki Ilander**	**The Promised Land**	**Bastarden**	
2024 (37th)	**Tanja Hausner**	**The Devil's Bath**	**Des Teufels Bad**	
2025 (38th)	**Sabrina Krämer**	**Sound of Falling**	**In die Sonne schauen**	
2025 (38th)	Ursula Patzak	Duse		
2025 (38th)	Michaela Horáčková Hořejší	Franz		
2026 (39th)	Ana López Cobos	La bola negra		
2026 (39th)	Doris Bartelt	Rose		
2026 (39th)	Rebecca Richmond and Jūlija Volkinšteine	Woman Unknown	Kvinde ukendt	

== See also ==
- Academy Award for Best Costume Design
- BAFTA Award for Best Costume Design
- César Award for Best Costume Design
