= European Film Academy Special Awards =

The following is a list of the European Film Award winners of various special awards:

== Winners ==
Year	Award	Recipient	Work	Comments
1988	Special Jury Award	(Italy) Bernardo Bertolucci	for The Last Emperor	—
1988	Special Jury Award	(Soviet Union) Jurij Chanin	for music in The Days of Eclipse	—
1989	Special Jury Award	(France) Bertrand Tavernier	for Life and Nothing But	—
1989	Special Jury Award	(Italy) Giuseppe Tornatore	for Nuovo Cinema Paradiso	—
1989	Special Mention	(Socialist Federal Republic of Yugoslavia) to the creative spirit of the new films coming from Sarajevo	—	—
1989	European Cinema Society Special Award	(France) Anatole Dauman	—	—
1990	Special Jury Award I	(Italy) Gian Maria Volonté	for Open Doors	The Jury wishes to express its gratitude to Gian Maria Volonté for his genius and generosity
1990	Special Jury Award II	(Republic of Ireland) Thaddeus O'Sullivan (director) (United Kingdom) Jonathan Cavendish (producer)	for December Bride	—
1990	European Cinema Society Special Award	(Soviet Union) Association of Filmmakers of the USSR	—	—
1991	European Cinema Society Special Award	(France) La Quinzaine Des Realisateurs	—	—
1992	European Film Academy Award of Merit	(United Kingdom) Museum of the Moving Image (London)	—	—
1993	European Film Academy Award of Merit	(Germany) Erika and Ulrich Gregor, (Russia) Naum Kleiman; The Berlin-Moscow-Connection	—	—
2020	Innovative Storytelling	(United Kingdom) Mark Cousins	Women Make Film: A New Road Movie Through Cinema	the European Film Academy wishes to pay tribute to a ground-breaking documentary produced by Hopscotch Films, a 14-hour odyssey introducing the viewer to many amazing but often overlooked female auteurs of cinema
