= 33rd European Film Awards =

2020 film awards ceremony online

- Date: 12 December 2020
- Site: Harpa, Reykjavík, Iceland (cancelled); Online
- Organized by: European Film Academy
- Official website: www.europeanfilmawards.eu

The 33rd European Film Awards was scheduled to be presented in Reykjavík, Iceland on 12 December 2020. Because of the COVID-19 pandemic the awards were announced in a virtual event online.

== Selection ==
=== Feature ===
The list of feature-length fiction films recommended for a nomination for the 2020 European Film Awards.

- Adults in the Room - Costa-Gavras (France/Greece)
- Another Round - Thomas Vinterberg (Denmark/Netherlands/Sweden)
- Atlantis - Valentyn Vasyanovich (Ukraine)
- Bad Tales - Damiano D'Innocenzo & Fabio D'Innocenzo (Italy/Switzerland)
- Berlin Alexanderplatz - Burhan Qurbani (Germany/Netherlands)
- Between Heaven and Earth - Najwa Najjar (Palestine/Luxembourg/Iceland)
- Cat in the Wall - Mina Mileva & Vesela Kazakova (Bulgaria/UK/France)
- Charlatan - Agnieszka Holland (Czech Republic/Ireland/Poland/Slovakia)
- Charter - Amanda Kernell (Sweden/Denmark/Norway)
- Corpus Christi - Jan Komasa (Poland/France)
- DAU. Natasha - Ilya Khrzhanovskiy & Jekaterina Oertel (Germany/Ukraine/UK/Russia)
- Delete History - Benoît Delépine & Gustave Kervern (France/Belgium)
- Echo - Rúnar Rúnarsson (Iceland/France)
- Enfant terrible - Oskar Roehler (Germany)
- Falling - Viggo Mortensen (UK/Canada/Denmark)
- Father - Srdan Golubović (Serbia/Germany/France/Croatia/Slovenia/Bosnia and Herzegovina)
- Final Report - István Szabó (Hungary)
- Hidden Away - Giorgio Diritti (Italy)
- Hope - Maria Sødahl (Norway/Sweden)
- Let There Be Light - Marko Škop (Slovakia/Czech Republic)
- Martin Eden - Pietro Marcello (Italy/France)
- Mother - Rodrigo Sorogoyen (Spain/France)
- Motherland - Tomas Vengris (Lithuania/Latvia/Greece/Germany)
- My Little Sister - Stéphanie Chuat & Véronique Reymond (Switzerland)
- Persian Lessons - Vadim Perelman (Russia/Germany/Belarus)
- Servants - Ivan Ostrochovský (Slovakia/Romania/Czech Republic/Ireland)
- Slalom - Charlène Favier (France)
- Summer of 85 - François Ozon (France, Belgium)
- The Big Hit - Emmanuel Courcol (France)
- The Endless Trench - Aitor Arregi, Jon Garaño & Jose Mari Goenaga (Spain/France)
- The Painted Bird - Václav Marhoul (Czech Republic/Ukraine/Slovakia)
- The Personal History of David Copperfield - Armando Iannucci (UK/USA)
- The Platform - Galder Gaztelu-Urrutia (Spain)
- Undine - Christian Petzold (Germany/France)
- Uppercase Print - Radu Jude (Romania)
- Vitalina Varela - Pedro Costa (Portugal)
- Wildland - Jeanette Nordahl (Denmark)
- Willow - Milcho Manchevski (North Macedonia/Hungary/Belgium/Albania)

=== Documentary ===
- Acasă, My Home - Radu Ciorniciuc (Romania/Germany/Finland)
- Collective - Alexander Nanau (Romania/Luxembourg)
- I Am Not Alone - Garin Hovannisian (Armenia)
- Little Girl - Sébastien Lifshitz (France)
- Il varco - Once More Unto the Breach - Federico Ferrone & Michele Manzolini (Italy)
- Saudi Runaway - Susanne Regina Meures (Switzerland)
- Self Portrait - Margreth Olin, Katja Hogset & Espen Wallin (Norway)
- State Funeral - Sergei Loznitsa (Netherlands/Lithuania)
- The Cave - Feras Fayyad (Syria/Denmark/Germany/USA/Qatar)
- The Earth Is Blue as an Orange - Iryna Tsilyk (Ukraine/Lithuania)
- The Euphoria of Being - Réka Szabó (Hungary)
- They Call Me Babu - Sandra Beerends (Netherlands)
- Walchensee Forever - Janna Ji Wonders (Germany)

=== Short film ===
The European Short Film 2020 is presented in co-operation with the following 24 European film festivals. At each of the festivals, the jury of the international competition appointed by the festival chooses a single candidate (there shall be no ex-aequo candidates). Then the participating festivals nominate five short films from the list of 24 candidates.

- 12 - 18 October 2019: International Film Festival of Cyprus - the jury has chosen In Between (dir. Samir Karahoda)
- 17 - 27 October 2019: Riga International Film Festival ( (Latvia) ) - the jury has chosen Uncle Thomas, Accounting for the Days (dir. Regina Pessoa)
- 19 - 26 October 2019: Valladolid International Film Festival ( (Spain) ) - the jury has chosen Flesh (dir. Camila Kater)
- 21 - 27 October 2019: Uppsala International Short Film Festival ( (Sweden) ) - the jury has chosen Past Perfect (dir. Jorge Jácome)
- 5 - 10 November 2019: Internationale Kurzfilmtage Winterthur ( (Switzerland) ) - the jury has chosen Community Gardens (dir. Vytautas Katkus)
- 7 - 17 November 2019: Cork Film Festival ( (Republic of Ireland) ) - the jury has chosen Things That Happen in the Bathroom (dir. Maggie M. Bailey)
- 15 November - 1 December 2019: Black Nights Festival / PÖFF Shorts ( (Estonia) ) - the jury has chosen 12 K. Marx Street (dir. Irine Jordania)
- 30 November - 7 December 2019: Leuven International Short Film Festival ( (Belgium) ) - the jury has chosen Lake of Happiness (dir. Aliaksei Paluyan)
- 22 January - 2 February 2020: International Film Festival Rotterdam ( (Netherlands) ) - the jury has chosen The Bite (dir. Pedro Neves Marques)
- 31 January - 8 February 2020: Clermont-Ferrand International Short Film Festival ( (France) ) - the jury has chosen Invisible Hero (dir. Cristèle Alves Meira)
- 20 February - 1 March 2020: Berlin International Film Festival ( (Germany) ) - the jury has chosen It Wasn't the Right Mountain, Mohammad (dir. Mili Pecherer)
- 4 - 8 March 2020: Tampere Film Festival ( (Finland) ) - the jury has chosen Memorable (dir. Bruno Collet)
- 1 - 5 April 2020: Go Short - International Short Film Festival Nijmegen ( (Netherlands) ) - the jury has chosen Sun Dog (dir. Dorian Jespers)
- 28 May - 2 June 2020: VIS Vienna Shorts Festival ( (Austria) ) - the jury has chosen The Best City Is No City At All (dir. Christoph Schwarz)
- 31 May - 7 June 2020: Krakow Film Festival ( (Poland) ) - the jury has chosen The Golden Buttons (dir. Alex Evstigneev)
- 2 - 8 June 2020: Kurzfilm Festival Hamburg ( (Germany) ) - the jury has chosen Genius Loci (dir. Adrien Mérigeau)
- 11 - 19 July 2020: Curtas Vila do Conde - International Film Festival ( (Portugal) ) - the jury has chosen Nha Mila (dir. Denise Fernandes)
- 28 July - 1 August 2020: Motovun Film Festival ( (Croatia) ) - the jury has chosen To the Dusty Sea (dir. Héloïse Ferlay)
- 5 - 15 August 2020: Locarno Film Festival ( (Switzerland) ) - the jury has chosen People on Saturday (dir. Jonas Ulrich)
- 14 - 21 August 2020: Sarajevo Film Festival ( (Bosnia and Herzegovina) ) - the jury has chosen All Cats Are Grey in the Dark (dir. Lasse Linder)
- 24 - 30 August 2020: OFF - Odense International Film Festival ( (Denmark) ) - the jury has chosen Nina (dir. Hristo Simeonov)
- 2 - 12 September 2020: Venice Film Festival ( (Italy) ) - the jury has chosen The Shift (dir. Laura Carreira)
- 20 - 26 September 2020: International Short Film Festival In Drama ( (Greece) ) - the jury has chosen Favourites (dir. Martin Monk)
- 22 - 27 September 2020: Encounters Film Festival ( (United Kingdom) ) - the jury has chosen The Tiger Who Came to Tea (dir. Robin Shaw)

== Awards voted by EFA Members ==
Nomination has been announced on 10 November 2020.

=== Feature ===
==== Best Film ====
English title	Director(s)	Producer(s)	Production companies	Country	Language
Another Round	Thomas Vinterberg	Sisse Graum Jørgensen, Kasper Dissing	Zentropa Entertainments, Zentropa Productions2	(Denmark) / (Netherlands) / (Sweden)	Danish, Swedish
Berlin Alexanderplatz	Burhan Qurbani	Leif Alexis, Jochen Laube, Fabian Maubach	Sommerhaus Filmproduktion, Lemming Film, ARTE, Entertainment One, Deutscher Filmförderfonds (DFFF), Medienboard Berlin-Brandenburg, Nederlands Filmfonds, Eurimages, Wild at Art	(Germany) / (Netherlands)	German, English
Corpus Christi	Jan Komasa	Leszek Bodzak, Aneta Hickinbotham	Aurum Films	(Poland) / (France)	Polish
Martin Eden	Pietro Marcello	Pietro Marcello, Beppe Caschetto, Thomas Ordonneau, Michael Weber, Viola Fügen	Avventurosa, IBC Movie, Rai Cinema	(Italy) / (France)	Italian, Neapolitan, French
The Painted Bird	Václav Marhoul	Václav Marhoul, Igor Savychenko, Zuzana Mistríková, Eduard Kucera, Richard Kaucký	Silver Screen, Ceská Televize, PubRes, RTVS, Directory Films	(Czech Republic) / (Slovakia) / (Ukraine)	Czech, German, Russian, Latin
Undine	Christian Petzold	Florian Koerner von Gustorf, Michael Weber, Margaret Menegoz	Schramm Film Koerner & Weber	(Germany) / (France)	German, English

==== European Comedy ====
The nominees were announced on 27 October 2020. The nominations were determined by a committee consisting of EFA Board Members Katriel Schory (Israel) and Angela Bosch Ríus (Spain), director/screenwriter Paddy Breathnach (Ireland), festival programmer Markus Duffner (Germany/Italy) and distributor/festival programmer Selma Mehadžić (Croatia).

English title	Director(s)	Producer(s)	Production companies	Country	Language
Advantages of Travelling by Train	Aritz Moreno	Merry Colomer, Leire Apellaniz & Juan Gordon	Morena Films, Logical Pictures, CNC, Castelao Pictures, Departamento de Cultura del Gobierno Vasco, Euskal Irrati Telebista (EiTB), Filmax, Instituto de la Cinematografía y de las Artes Audiovisuales (ICAA), Movistar+, Radio Televisión Española (RTVE), Señor & Señora, Ventajas de Viajar en Tren	(Spain) / (France)	Spanish, French, English, Russian
The Big Hit	Emmanuel Courcol	Marc Bordure & Robert Guédiguian	Agat Films & Cie	(France)	French
Ladies of Steel	Pamela Tola	Aleksi Bardy, Dome Karukoski & Sirkka Rautiainen	Helsinki-Filmi	(Finland)	Finnish

==== Best Director ====
Director(s)	English title
(Denmark) Thomas Vinterberg	Another Round
(Poland) Agnieszka Holland	Charlatan
(Poland) Jan Komasa	Corpus Christi
(Norway) Maria Sødahl	Hope
(Italy) Pietro Marcello	Martin Eden
(France) François Ozon	Summer of 85

==== Best Screenwriter ====
Screenwriter(s)	English title
(Greece) / (France) Costa-Gavras	Adults in the Room
(Denmark) Thomas Vinterberg (Denmark) Tobias Lindholm	Another Round
(Italy) the D'Innocenzo Brothers	Bad Tales
(Germany) Martin Behnke (Germany) / (Afghanistan) Burhan Qurbani	Berlin Alexanderplatz
(Poland) Mateusz Pacewicz	Corpus Christi
(Italy) Maurizio Braucci (Italy) Pietro Marcello	Martin Eden

==== Best Actor ====
Actor	English title	Role
(Denmark) Mads Mikkelsen	Another Round	Martin
(Poland) Bartosz Bielenia	Corpus Christi	Daniel
(Denmark) / (United States) Viggo Mortensen	Falling	John Petersen
(Croatia) Goran Bogdan	Father	Nikola
(Italy) Elio Germano	Hidden Away	Antonio Ligabue
(Italy) Luca Marinelli	Martin Eden	Martin Eden

==== Best Actress ====
Actress	English title	Role
(Germany) Paula Beer	Undine	Undine
(Norway) Ane Dahl Torp	Charter	Alice
(Russia) Natasha Berezhnaya	DAU. Natasha	Natasha
(Norway) Andrea Bræin Hovig	Hope	Anja
(Spain) Marta Nieto	Mother	Elena
(Germany) Nina Hoss	My Little Sister	Lisa

=== Documentary ===
English title	Director(s)	Producer(s)	Production companies	Country	Language
Acasă, My Home	Radu Ciorniciuc	Monica Lazurean-Gorgan	HBO Europe, HBO Romania, Manifest Film	(Romania) / (Germany) / (Finland)	Romanian, English
The Cave	Feras Fayyad	Kirstine Barfod, Sigrid Dyekjær	Danish Documentary Production	(Syria) / (Denmark)	Arabic, English
Collective	Alexander Nanau	Alexander Nanau, Bianca Oana, Bernard Michaux, Hanka Kastelocova	Alexander Nanau Production, HBO Europe, Samsa Film	(Romania) / (Luxembourg)	Romanian, English
Gunda	Victor Kossakovsky	Joslyn Barnes, Anita Rehoff Larsen	Artemis Rising Foundation, Empathy Arts, Fritt Ord Foundation, Louverture Films, MEDIA Programme of the European Union, Norwegian Film Institute, Sant & Usant, Storyline Studios	(Norway) / (Russia)	English
Little Girl	Sébastien Lifshitz	Muriel Meynard	Agat & Cie	(France)	French
Saudi Runaway	Susanne Regina Meures	Christian Frei	-	(Switzerland)	-

=== Animated Feature ===
The nominations were determined by a committee consisting of EFA Board Member EFA Board Member Béatrice Thiriet (France), director Anca Damian (Romania), producer Antonio Saura (Spain) and, representing CARTOON, the European Association of Animation Film, Diogo Carvalho (producer, Portugal), Camilla Deakin (producer, UK) and Norbert Laporte (institutional, Luxembourg).

English title	Director(s)	Producer(s)	Production companies	Country	Language
Calamity	Rémy Chayé	Henri Magalon & Claire Lacombe	Maybe Movies, Noerlum Studios	(France) / (Denmark)	French
Josep	Aurel	Serge Lalou	Les Films d'Ici Méditerranée, Imagic Telecom	(France) / (Belgium) / (Spain)	French, Spanish, Catalan, English
Klaus	Sergio Pablos	Jinko Gotoh, Sergio Pablos & Marisa Román	The SPA Studios, Atresmedia Cine	(Spain)	English, Saami
The Nose or the Conspiracy of Mavericks	Andrey Khrzhanovsky	Andrey Khrzhanovsky & Nikolay Makovsky	School Studio 'Shar'	(Russia)	Russian, English

=== Short film ===
English title	Director(s)	Producer(s)	Country
All Cats Are Grey in the Dark	Lasse Linder	Edith Flückiger	Switzerland
Genius Loci	Adrien Mérigeau	Jean-Christophe Reymond, Amaury Ovise	France
Past Perfect	Jorge Jácome	Jorge Jácome	Portugal
Sun Dog	Dorian Jespers	Dorian Jespers	Belgium, Russia
Uncle Thomas: Accounting for the Days	Regina Pessoa	Abi Feijó, Julie Roy, Reginald de Guillebon	Portugal, Canada, France

== Critics Award ==
=== European Discovery - Prix FIPRESCI ===
The nominees were announced on 8 October 2020. The nominations were determined by a committee composed of EFA Board Members Valérie Delpierre (Spain) and Anita Juka (Croatia), curator Giona A. Nazzaro (Italy) as well as film critics Marta Bałaga (Finland/Poland), Andrei Plakhov (Russia) and Frédéric Ponsard (France), all three as representatives of FIPRESCI, the International Federation of Film Critics.

English title	Director(s)	Producer(s)	Production companies	Country	Language
Sole	Carlo Sironi	Giovanni Pompili	Kino Produzioni	(Italy) / (Poland)	Italian
Full Moon	Nermin Hamzagic	Amra Baksic Camo, Adis Djapo	SCCA / pro.ba	(Bosnia and Herzegovina)	Bosnian
Gagarine	Fanny Liatard, Jérémy Trouilh	Julie Billy, Carole Scotta	Haut et Court	(France)	French
Instinct	Halina Reijn	Frans Van Gestel, Laurette Schillings, Arnold Heslenfeld	Topkapi Films	(Netherlands)	Dutch
Isaac	Jurgis Matulevicius	Stasys Baltakis	Film Jam	(Lithuania)	Lithuanian, German, Russian
Jumbo	Zoé Wittock	Anaïs Bertrand, Annabella Nezri, Gilles Chanial	Insolence Productions	(France) / (Belgium) / (Luxembourg)	French

== Audience awards ==
=== Lux European Audience Film Award ===
The three nominated films are viewed by audiences in cinemas (online if the situation requires it) across Europe, via the LUX Film Days (February – May) and the LUX Audience Week (March or May depending on the ceremony date). Voting opens for the public from day 1 after the EFA Ceremony until two weeks before the LUX Ceremony. Members of the European Parliament vote from the beginning of March until the day before the Awards Ceremony (exact timeline TBD/TBC). The final ranking will be determined by combining the public vote ratings and the vote ratings by the Members of the European Parliament, with each group weighing 50 per cent. The film with the highest average rating will become the winner.

English title	Director(s)	Country	Language
Collective	Alexander Nanau	(Romania) / (Luxembourg)	Romanian, English
Another Round	Thomas Vinterberg	(Denmark) / (Netherlands) / (Sweden)	Danish, Swedish
Corpus Christi	Jan Komasa	(Poland) / (France)	Polish

=== University Award ===
The European Film Academy and Filmfest Hamburg have announced five following movies as a European University Film Award (EUFA) nominee.

English title	Director(s)	Producer(s)	Production companies	Country	Language
Another Round	Thomas Vinterberg	Sisse Graum Jørgensen, Kasper Dissing	Zentropa Entertainments, Film i Väst, Topkapi Films, Zentropa International Netherlands, Zentropa International Sweden	(Denmark)	Danish
Saudi Runaway	Susanne Regina Meures	Christian Frei	TBA	(Switzerland)	TBA
Berlin Alexanderplatz	Burhan Qurbani	Leif Alexis, Jochen Laube, Fabian Maubach	Sommerhaus Filmproduktion, Lemming Film, ARTE, Entertainment One, Deutscher Filmförderfonds (DFFF), Medienboard Berlin-Brandenburg, Nederlands Filmfonds, Eurimages, Wild at Art	(Germany)	German, English
Corpus Christi	Jan Komasa	Leszek Bodzak, Aneta Hickinbotham	Aurum Film	(Poland)	Polish
Slalom	Charlène Favier	Édouard Mauriat	Mille et Une Productions	(France)	French

== Technical awards ==
The winners for the Excellence Awards were presented on 9 December 2020.

=== Best Composer ===
Winner(s)	English title
(Germany) Dascha Dauenhauer	Berlin Alexanderplatz

=== Best Production Designer ===
Winner(s)	English title
(United Kingdom) Cristina Casali	The Personal History of David Copperfield

=== Best Makeup and Hairstyling ===
Winner(s)	English title
(Spain) Yolanda Piña (Spain) Félix Terrero (Spain) Nacho Díaz	The Endless Trench

=== Best Sound Designer ===
Winner(s)	English title
(France) Yolande Decarsin	Little Girl (Petite fille)

=== Best Cinematographer ===
Winner(s)	English title
(Italy) Matteo Cocco	Hidden Away

=== Best Costume Designer ===
Winner(s)	English title
(Germany) Ursula Patzak	Hidden Away

=== Best Editor ===
Winner(s)	English title
(Italy) Maria Fantastica Valmori	Once More Unto the Breach

=== Best Visual Effects ===
Winner(s)	English title
(Spain) Iñaki Madariaga	The Platform
