= European Film Award for Best Makeup and Hairstyling =

Annual award given for cinematic achievements in makeup and hairstyling

- Country: Europe
- Presented by: European Film Academy
- First award: 2016
- Currently held by: Torsten Witte – Bugonia (2025)
- Website: europeanfilmawards.eu

The European Film Award for Best Makeup and Hairstyling is one of the awards presented annually by the European Film Academy. The category was first presented in 2016 though prior to that, two makeup artists and hairstylists received nominations for the Award of Excellence, in 2007 and 2009.

== Winners and nominees ==
The winners are in a yellow background and in bold.

=== 2000s ===
Year	Recipient(s)	English title	Original title
2007 (20th)	Nomination for Award of Excellence		
2007 (20th)	Didier Lavergne	La Vie en Rose	La Môme
2009 (22nd)	Nomination for Award of Excellence		
2009 (22nd)	Waldemar Pokromski	The Baader Meinhof Complex	Der Baader Meinhof Komplex

=== 2010s ===
Year	Recipient(s)	English title	Original title
2016 (29th)	**Barbara Kreuzer**	**Land of Mine**	**Under sandet**
2017 (30th)	**Leendert van Nimwegen**	**Brimstone**	
2018 (31st)	**Dalia Colli, Lorenzo Tamburini, and Daniela Tartari**	**Dogman**	
2019 (32nd)	(United Kingdom) **Nadia Stacey**	**The Favourite**	

=== 2020s ===
Year	Recipient(s)	English title	Original title
2020 (33rd)	**Yolanda Piña, Félix Terrero, and Nacho Díaz**	**The Endless Trench**	**La trinchera infinita**
2021 (34th)	**Flore Masson,** **Olivier Afonso, and** **Antoine Mancini**	**Titane**	
2022 (35th)	**Heike Merker**	**All Quiet on the Western Front**	**Im Westen nichts Neues**
2023 (36th)	**Ana López-Puigcerver,** **Belén López-Puigcerver,** **David Martí, and** **Montse Ribé**	**Society of the Snow**	**La sociedad de la nieve**
2024 (37th)	**Evalotte Oosterop**	**When the Light Breaks**	**Ljósbrot**
2025 (38th)	**Torsten Witte**	**Bugonia**	
2025 (38th)	Gabriela Poláková	Franz	
2025 (38th)	Irina Schwarz and Anne-Marie Walther	Sound of Falling	In die Sonne schauen
2026 (39th)	Evalotte Oosterop and Pierre Olivier Persin	Coward	
2026 (39th)	Waldemar Pokromski	Fatherland	
2026 (39th)	Pablo Morillas and Mariló Osuna	La bola negra	
