= Albert Yavuryan =

Armenian film producer

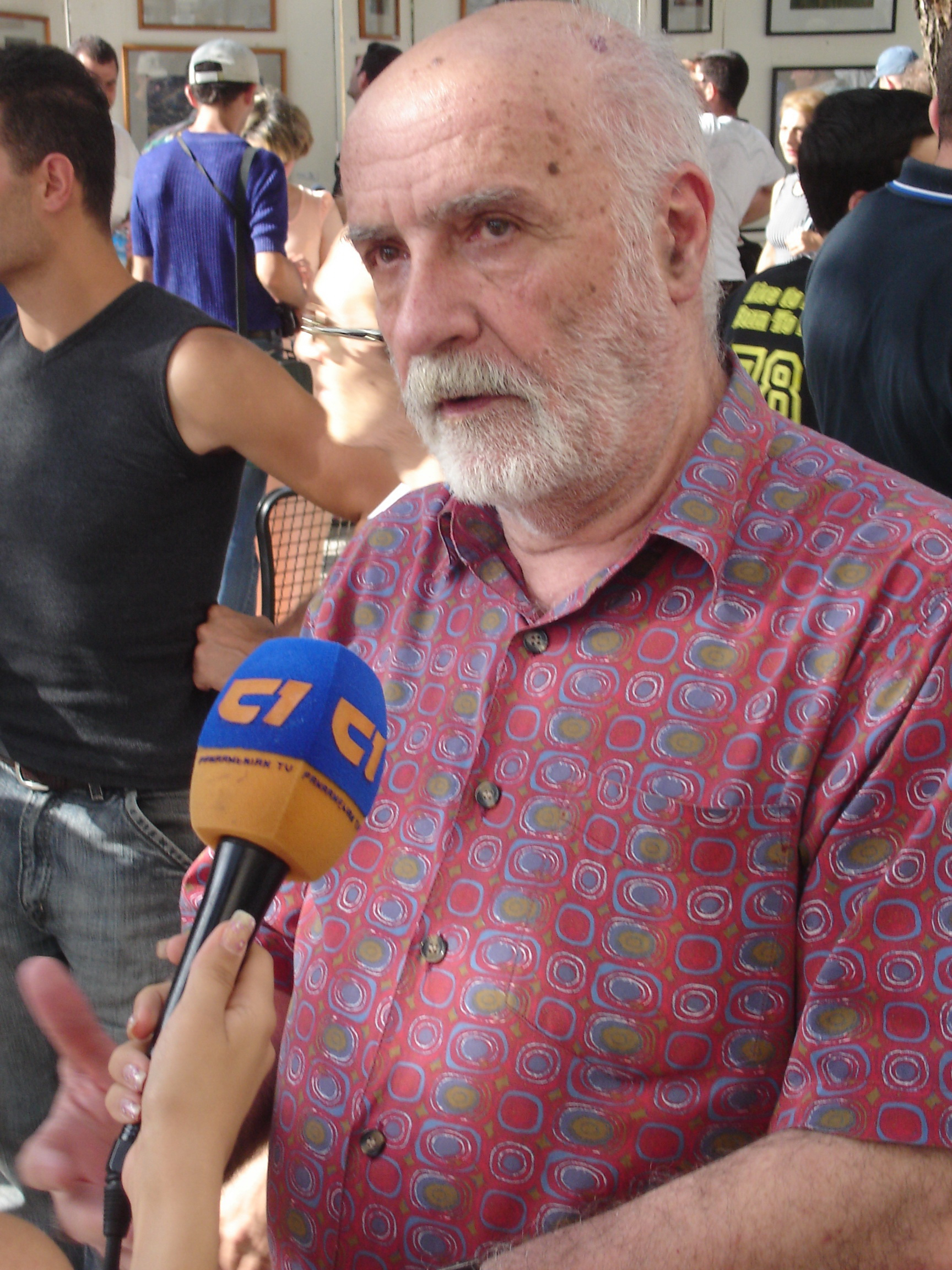
- Yavuryan in 2006
- Born: Albert Garnikovich Yavuryan; August 26, 1935 (age 91); Gyumri, Armenia
- Education: Moscow All-Union Film Institute
- Occupations: film director, producer & actor
- Years active: 1964 - 1999

Albert Garnikovich Yavuryan (Armenian: Ալբերտ Յավուրյան) (August 26, 1935, Gyumri, Armenia – November 3, 2007, Yerevan, Armenia) is an Armenian film producer.

== Biography ==
He graduated from the Moscow All-Union Film Institute. Yavuryan was awarded the Movses Khorenatsi Medal in 1999 and the Merited Artist of Armenia. Ashik Kerib was one of his films.

=== Death ===
Serzh Sargsyan, president of Armenia made a comment on Yavuryan's death, on November 3, 2007.

I learnt about Albert Yavuryan’s death with great grief. The loss is great. One of the most known operators of the 20th century has left life. He really made a revolution in the Soviet film art,

Albert Yavuryan's funeral was held on November 6, 2007 at the Komitas Chamber Music Hall, funerals, Yerevan City Pantheon.

== See also ==
- Armenfilm
