= Ashik Kerib =

1837 short story by Mikhail Lermontov

"Ashik Kerib" (Russian: Ашик Кериб) is a short story by Mikhail Lermontov written in 1837. Aplin describes its status as "obscure" and appearing to be an "unrevised transcription of a folk tale that was well known in slightly different versions throughout the Caucasus". Powelstock describes it as "what appears to be a transcription, in prose, of a Turkish fairy-tale". Together with his later A Hero of Our Time, Ashik Kerib testifies to the substantial part the landscapes and traditions of the Caucasus played in Lermontov's creative consciousness. "Ashik Kerib" is also part of the 19th-century genre of Russian literature of Caucasus writings (produced at a time when the Russian Empire was engaged in a prolonged drive to acquire the lands south of the Caucasus Mountains).

== Synopsis ==
Kerib, a poor but good-hearted ashik (minstrel) living in the city of Tiflis, is in love with Magul-Megeri, the beautiful daughter of a local rich man. The feeling is mutual, but Magul-Megeri's father would prefer her to marry Kurshudbek, a rather rude but wealthier man who has long has his eye on her. Ashik Kerib makes a deal with her father: he will travel the world for seven years and earn enough wealth to be worthy of Magul-Megeri's hand. If he fails to return or returns with not enough, she will have to marry Kurshudbek.

On Ashik Kerib's way out of the city, Kurshudbek meets him on the road and they travel together for a short while, until they reach a river. There is no bridge, so Kurshudbek tells Ashik Kerib to take off his robe and swim across, he would follow close behind. As soon as Ashik Kerib is in the river, though, Kurshudbek steals his robe and rides back to Tiflis, where he goes to the house of Ashik Kerib's mother and tells her that her son has drowned in the river, offering the wet robe as proof. She weeps bitterly, but Magul-Megeri tells her not to believe Kurshudbek, it is all a trick to make her marry him. For her part, Magul-Megeri flatly refuses to marry Kurshudbek before the seven years have gone by.

Unaware of the drama unfolding back in Tiflis, Ashik Kerib wanders on, traveling from village to village, singing and playing his saz (Turkic lute) in exchange for food and shelter. Eventually he comes to the city of Khalaf, where he begins playing and singing in a tavern. In Khalaf there is a wealthy pasha who loves music, and many musicians have come to his court hoping for some rewards or gifts, but he is never satisfied with any of them and kicks each one out with no payment whatsoever. But as soon as the townsfolk hear Ashik Kerib, they all urge him to go and play for the pasha, who they say is sure to like him. Ashik Kerib is not entirely convinced, but goes and plays anyway. He sings a song in praise of his beloved Magul-Megeri, and it touches the angry pasha so deeply that he immediately agrees to take on Ashik Kerib into his own house.

In the care of the pasha of Khalaf, Ashik Kerib gets very rich. He wears the finest clothes, eats the best food, and lives comfortably and happily, with all he could ever wish for. He stays with the pasha for nearly seven years, and all but forgets his home and his beloved.

Meanwhile, back in Tiflis, Magul-Megeri is getting worried. Has her Ashik Kerib forgotten her? Or worse, has he really been killed like Kurshudbek said? She gets an idea, and goes to see the town merchant who is about to leave with the caravanserai. She gives him a golden plate from her home, one that she knows Ashik Kerib will recognize, and instructs him to show it to every man in every town he visits to see who recognizes it. He agrees, and it goes just according to plan: when he reaches Khalaf and is showing the dish around, Ashik Kerib shouts from the crowd that it is his. The merchant recognizes Ashik Kerib as well, and tells him that he'd better hurry up back to Tiflis, because the seven years are almost up and if he does not return in time, she will be given to Kurshudbek.

Suddenly remembering everything, Ashik Kerib clutches his head in his hands with shame, and immediately gets on his horse to ride back to Tiflis. But he has only three days before the seven years are up, and it is at least three months to Tiflis. Everything looks hopeless. In despair, Ashik Kerib cries out to the heavens: "O mighty Allah! If you don't help me now, then there is nothing left for me on Earth!"

Then suddenly Ashik Kerib sees in the distance a man on a great white horse. The man calls out to him: "What is it you desire?" Ashik Kerib miserably replies that he wants to die. "Well, get down on the ground then, if that's what you want, and I'll kill you," says the man, but Ashik Kerib hesitates and decides he doesn't really want to die.

The man invites Ashik Kerib to follow along behind him, but Ashik Kerib's horse is too slow, so the man lets him sit behind him in the saddle of the great white horse. The man asks him where he needs to go, and Ashik Kerib replies that first of all he needs to make it to the town of Arzrum. So the man instructs Ashik Kerib to close his eyes, and a few seconds later when he opens them he is astonished to see that they are in Arzrum! Ashik Kerib gets curious, and tells the man that he made a mistake, and he really had to be in Kars. So again, he closes his eyes and when he opens them, finds himself in Kars.

Now Ashik Kerib is terribly ashamed of himself, throws himself down onto his knees and begs forgiveness from the mysterious man for lying, and tells him that really, he has to be in Tiflis. The man is angry, but agrees to take him finally to Tiflis.

== See also ==
- Ashik Kerib (film)
- Culture of Azerbaijan
