= European Film Awards =

Annual film award presented by the European Film Academy

- Current: 39th European Film Awards
- Awarded for: Excellence in European cinematic achievements
- Location: Europe
- Presented by: European Film Academy
- First award: 1988
- Website: www.europeanfilmawards.eu

The European Film Awards (or European Film Academy Awards) have been presented annually since 1988 by the European Film Academy to recognize excellence in European cinematic achievements. The awards are given in 19 categories, of which the most important is the Best Film. They are restricted to European cinema and European producers, directors and actors. The awards were officially also called the "Felix Awards" until 1997, in reference to the former award's trophy statuette, which was replaced by a feminine statuette.

From 1997 to 2024, the European Film Awards were held in early- to mid-December. Starting 2025, it is held mid-January the following year. Hosting duties have alternated between Berlin, Germany in odd-numbered years and other European cities in even-numbered years. The 33rd European Film Awards were held on 12 December 2020 as a virtual ceremony. In reaction to the 2022 Russian invasion of Ukraine, Russian films were excluded from the 2022 European Film Awards.

== Awarding procedures ==
Feature films participating in the European Film Awards must be European feature-length fiction films intended for normal theatrical release which must have had their first official screening (be it at a festival or at a regular cinema) after 1 July of the year before. Based on a selection of approximately 40 films recommended for a nomination, the members of the European Film Academy vote for the nominations in the main categories, which are announced in early November at the Seville European Film Festival. Based on the nominations, the members of the European Film Academy then vote for the winners which are announced at the European Film Awards Ceremony in early December.

== Eligibility ==
The criteria whereby a film qualifies as European are based upon the European Convention on Cinematographic Co-production, Appendix II, issued by the Council of Europe. This definition might be extended for Israeli and Palestinian works and nationalities. A cinematographic work qualifies as European if it achieves at least 16 points (out of 21).

The European Film Academy uses a lower minimum of 13 points.

European elements	Weighting Points
Creative group
Director	4
Script writer	3
Composer	1
Performing group
First role	3
Second role	2
Third role	1
Technical craft group
Head of Department – cinematography	1
Head of Department – sound	1
Head of Department – picture editing	1
Head of Department – production or costume design	1
Studio or shooting location	1
VFX or CGI location	1
Post-production location	1

== Host cities ==
Year	Date	Venue	City	Presenter	Director
1st (1988)^{[C]}	1 Dec. 1988	Theater des Westens	(West Germany) West Berlin	Jan Niklas, Désirée Nosbusch	Robin Bextor
2nd (1989)^{[C]}	25 Nov. 1989	Théâtre des Champs-Elysées	(France) Paris	Fernando Rey, Agnès Soral	
3rd (1990)^{[C]}	2 Dec. 1990	Royal Concert Hall	(Scotland) Glasgow	Sheena McDonald, Melvyn Bragg	
4th (1991)	1 Dec. 1991	Babelsberg	(Germany) Potsdam	Désirée Nosbusch-Becker, Johannes Willms	
5th (1992)	25 Nov. 1992	Babelsberg	(Germany) Potsdam	Senta Berger, Ben Kingsley	
6th (1993)	4 Dec. 1993	Babelsberg	(Germany) Potsdam	Fanny Ardant	
7th (1994)	27 Nov. 1994	Spiegelzelt	(Germany) Berlin	-	
8th (1995)	12 Nov. 1995	Bar jeder Vernunft	(Germany) Berlin	-	
9th (1996)	8 Nov. 1996	Blue Tent in Lützowplatz	(Germany) Berlin	-	
10th (1997)	7 Dec. 1997	Flughafen Tempelhof	(Germany) Berlin	Tania Bryer	
11th (1998)	4 Dec. 1998	Old Vic Theatre	(England) London	Mel Smith, Carole Bouquet	
12th (1999)	4 Dec. 1999	Schiller Theater	(Germany) Berlin	Mel Smith, Carole Bouquet	
13th (2000)	2 Dec. 2000	Chaillot National Theatre	(France) Paris	Rupert Everett, Antoine de Caunes	
14th (2001)	1 Dec. 2001	Tempodrom	(Germany) Berlin	Mel Smith	
15th (2002)	7 Dec. 2002	Rome Opera House	(Italy) Rome	Asia Argento, Mel Smith	
16th (2003)	6 Dec. 2003	Treptow Arena	(Germany) Berlin	Heino Ferch	
17th (2004)	11 Dec. 2004	Forum Convention Center	(Spain) Barcelona	Maria de Medeiros, Juanjo Puigcorbé	Manuel Huerga
18th (2005)	3 Dec. 2005	Treptow Arena	(Germany) Berlin	Heino Ferch	Pepe Danquart
19th (2006)	2 Dec. 2006	EXPO XXI Center	(Poland) Warsaw	Maciej Stuhr, Sophie Marceau	Volker Weicker
20th (2007)	1 Dec. 2007	Treptow Arena	(Germany) Berlin	Jan Josef Liefers, Emmanuelle Béart	Volker Weicker
21st (2008)	6 Dec. 2008	Forum	(Denmark) Copenhagen	Mikael Bertelsen	Andreas Morell
22nd (2009)^{[C]}	12 Dec. 2009	Hall of the Century	(Germany) Bochum	Anke Engelke	Andreas Morell
23rd (2010)^{[C]}	4 Dec. 2010	Nokia Concert Hall	(Estonia) Tallinn	Anke Engelke, Märt Avandi	Andreas Morell
24th (2011)	3 Dec. 2011	Tempodrom	(Germany) Berlin	Anke Engelke	Nadja Zonsarowa
25th (2012)	1 Dec. 2012	Mediterranean Conference Centre	(Malta) Valletta	Anke Engelke	Nadja Zonsarowa
26th (2013)	7 Dec. 2013	Haus der Berliner Festspiele	(Germany) Berlin	Anke Engelke	Nadja Zonsarowa
27th (2014)^{[C]}	13 Dec. 2014	Latvian National Opera	(Latvia) Riga	Thomas Hermanns	Michael Maier
28th (2015)	12 Dec. 2015	Haus der Berliner Festspiele	(Germany) Berlin	Thomas Hermanns	Nadja Zonsarowa
29th (2016)^{[C]}	10 Dec. 2016	National Forum of Music	(Poland) Wrocław	Maciej Stuhr	Maria von Heland, Nadja Zonsarowa
30th (2017)	9 Dec. 2017	Haus der Berliner Festspiele	(Germany) Berlin	Thomas Hermanns	Maria von Heland, Nadja Zonsarowa
31st (2018)	15 Dec. 2018	Teatro de la Maestranza	(Spain) Seville	Rossy de Palma, Ashraf Barhom, Amira Casar, Anamaria Marinca, Ivan Shvedoff, Tom Wlaschiha	Maria von Heland, Nadja Zonsarowa
32nd (2019)	7 Dec. 2019	Haus der Berliner Festspiele	(Germany) Berlin	Anna Brüggemann, Aistė Diržiūtė	Dietrich Brüggemann, Nadja Zonsarowa
33rd (2020)	12 Dec. 2020	Online from Futurium	(Germany) Berlin	Steven Gätjen	
34th (2021)	11 Dec. 2021	Haus der Berliner Festspiele	(Germany) Berlin		
35th (2022)	10 Dec. 2022	Harpa Conference and Concert Hall	(Iceland) Reykjavík		Unnsteinn Manuel
36th (2023)	9 Dec. 2023	Arena Berlin	(Germany) Berlin	Britta Steffenhagen	Robert Lehniger
37th (2024)	7 Dec. 2024	Lucerne Culture and Congress Centre	(Switzerland) Luzern	Fernando Tiberini	
38th (2025) ^{[C]}	17 Jan. 2026	Haus der Kulturen der Welt	(Germany) Berlin		

^{^[C]}European Capital of Culture event

Up through the 2025 ceremony, 16 cities in 10 countries have hosted the contest. Berlin has been host 19 times, Potsdam 3 times, and Paris 2 times. Barcelona, Bochum, Copenhagen, Glasgow, London, Lucerne, Riga, Rome, Seville, Tallinn, Valletta, Warsaw, and Wroclaw, have each hosted once.

Locations of the European Film Awards ceremonies.

== Award categories ==
=== Current categories ===
- Best Film
- Best Comedy
- European Discovery
- Best Animated Feature Film
- Best Short Film
- Best Documentary Film
- Best Director
- Best Actor
- Best Actress
- Best Composer
- Best Editor
- Best Screenwriter
- Best Production Designer
- Best Cinematographer
- Best European Co-Production
- Best Sound Designer
- Best Costume Designer
- Best Makeup and Hairstyling
- Best Visual Effects

=== Audience awards ===
- Audience Award for Best Film
- Young Audience Award
- University Award (Student's Choice)

=== Special awards ===
- Lifetime Achievement
- Achievement in World Cinema

=== Defunct awards ===
- Best Non-European Film
- Best Young Film
- Best Supporting Actor
- Best Supporting Actress
- Best Supporting Performance
- Best Young Actor or Actress
- People's Choice Award Best Actor
- People's Choice Award Best Actress
- People's Choice Award Best Director
- Prix d'Excellence
- Critics Award
- Award of Merit
- Honorary Award
- Special Jury Award
- European Cinema Society Special Award
- Special Mention

=== Proposed awards ===
- Best Animated Short Subject
- Best Live Action Short Subject
- Best Documentary Short Subject
- Best Music Video
- Best Cast
- Best Action or Adventure Film
- Best Sound Editing
- Best Sound Mixing
- Best Screenwriter - Adapted
- Best Screenwriter - Original
- Best Costume Designer in Contemporary Film
- Best Costume Designer in Historic Film
- Best Costume Designer in Unreal World (Sci-Fi/Fantasy) Film
- Best Production Designer in Contemporary Film
- Best Production Designer in Historic Film
- Best Production Designer in Unreal World (Sci-Fi/Fantasy) Film
- Best Makeup and Hairstylist in Contemporary Film
- Best Makeup and Hairstylist in Historic Film
- Best Makeup and Hairstylist in Unreal World (Sci-Fi/Fantasy) Film
- Best Choreographer
- Best Original Song
- Best Poster
- Best Stunt Ensemble
- Best Actor – Series
- Best Actress – Series
- Best African Film
- Best Latin American Film
- Best North American Film
- Best Asian Film
- Best Middle East and North Africa Film
- Best Australia and Pacific Film

=== Timeline ===
Editions:	19; 88	19; 89	19; 90	19; 91	19; 92	19; 93	19; 94	19; 95	19; 96	19; 97	19; 98	19; 99	20; 00	20; 01	20; 02	20; 03	20; 04	20; 05	20; 06	20; 07	20; 08	20; 09	20; 10	20; 11	20; 12	20; 13	20; 14	20; 15	20; 16	20; 17	20; 18	20; 19	20; 20	20; 21	20; 22	20; 23
Film																																				
Non-European Film																																				
Comedy																																				
Young Film/Discovery																																				
Animated Feature																																				
Documentary																																				
Short Film																																				
Fiction Series																																				
Editions:	19; 88	19; 89	19; 90	19; 91	19; 92	19; 93	19; 94	19; 95	19; 96	19; 97	19; 98	19; 99	20; 00	20; 01	20; 02	20; 03	20; 04	20; 05	20; 06	20; 07	20; 08	20; 09	20; 10	20; 11	20; 12	20; 13	20; 14	20; 15	20; 16	20; 17	20; 18	20; 19	20; 20	20; 21	20; 22	20; 23
Director																																				
Screenwriter						^{[a]}																														
Actor																																				
Actress																																				
Supporting Actor																																				
Supporting Actress																																				
Supporting Performance																																				
Young Actor or Actress																																				
Composer																																				
Cinematographer	^{[a]}																																			
Co-Producer																																				
Editor																			^{[a]}																	
Production Designer	^{[a]}																		^{[a]}																	
Costume Designer				^{[b]}																^{[a]}																
Sound Designer																				^{[a]}																
Makeup Hairstyling																				^{[a]}		^{[a]}														
Visual Effects																																				
Innovative Storytelling																																				
Editions:	19; 88	19; 89	19; 90	19; 91	19; 92	19; 93	19; 94	19; 95	19; 96	19; 97	19; 98	19; 99	20; 00	20; 01	20; 02	20; 03	20; 04	20; 05	20; 06	20; 07	20; 08	20; 09	20; 10	20; 11	20; 12	20; 13	20; 14	20; 15	20; 16	20; 17	20; 18	20; 19	20; 20	20; 21	20; 22	20; 23
Lifetime Achievement																																				
Achievement in World Cinema																																				
Honorary Award																																				
Critics's Choice																						^{[c]}														
People's Choice - Director																																				
People's Choice - Actor																																				
People's Choice - Actress																																				
People's Choice - Film																																	^{[d]}			
Young Audience Choice																																				
University Award - Student's Choice																																				
Editions:	19; 88	19; 89	19; 90	19; 91	19; 92	19; 93	19; 94	19; 95	19; 96	19; 97	19; 98	19; 99	20; 00	20; 01	20; 02	20; 03	20; 04	20; 05	20; 06	20; 07	20; 08	20; 09	20; 10	20; 11	20; 12	20; 13	20; 14	20; 15	20; 16	20; 17	20; 18	20; 19	20; 20	20; 21	20; 22	20; 23

^{^[a]}Category included in the cumulative category named Award of Excellence or Artistic Contribution Achievement
^{^[b]}Category included in the Production Designer category
^{^[c]}Critics choice transferred to European Discovery
^{^[d]}People's Choice transferred to European Parliaments Lux Prize Audience Film Award

== Films with multiple wins ==
8 wins

- The Favourite (2019)

6 wins

- Good Bye, Lenin! (2003)
- The Ghost Writer (2010)
- The Square (2017)
- Cold War (2018)
- Anatomy of a Fall (2023)
- Sentimental Value (2025)

5 wins

- Talk to Her (2002)
- Caché (2005)
- Volver (2006)
- Gomorrah (2008)
- Ida (2014)
- Toni Erdmann (2016)
- Emilia Perez (2024)
- Sirāt (2025)

4 wins

- Open Doors (1990)
- Toto the Hero (1991)
- Dancer in the Dark (2000)
- Amélie (2001)
- Amour (2012)
- The Great Beauty (2013)
- Another Round (2020)
- Quo Vadis, Aida? (2021)
- Triangle of Sadness (2022)

3 wins

- High Hopes (1989)
- The Northerners (1992)
- Les Amants du Pont-Neuf (1992)
- Breaking the Waves (1996)
- All About My Mother (1999)
- Sunshine (1999)
- Sophie Scholl – The Final Days (2005)
- The Lives of Others (2006)
- The White Ribbon (2009)
- The King's Speech (2011)
- Melancholia (2011)
- Youth (2015)
- Land of Mine (2016)
- Dogman (2018)
- Flee (2021)
- The Promised Land (2023)

== See also ==
- Lux Prize
- Film Award of the Council of Europe
- Prix Europa
- European Union MEDIA Prize
- MTV Europe Music Awards
- European Border Breakers Award
