= Vladlena Sandu =

Crimea-born filmmaker and screenwriter

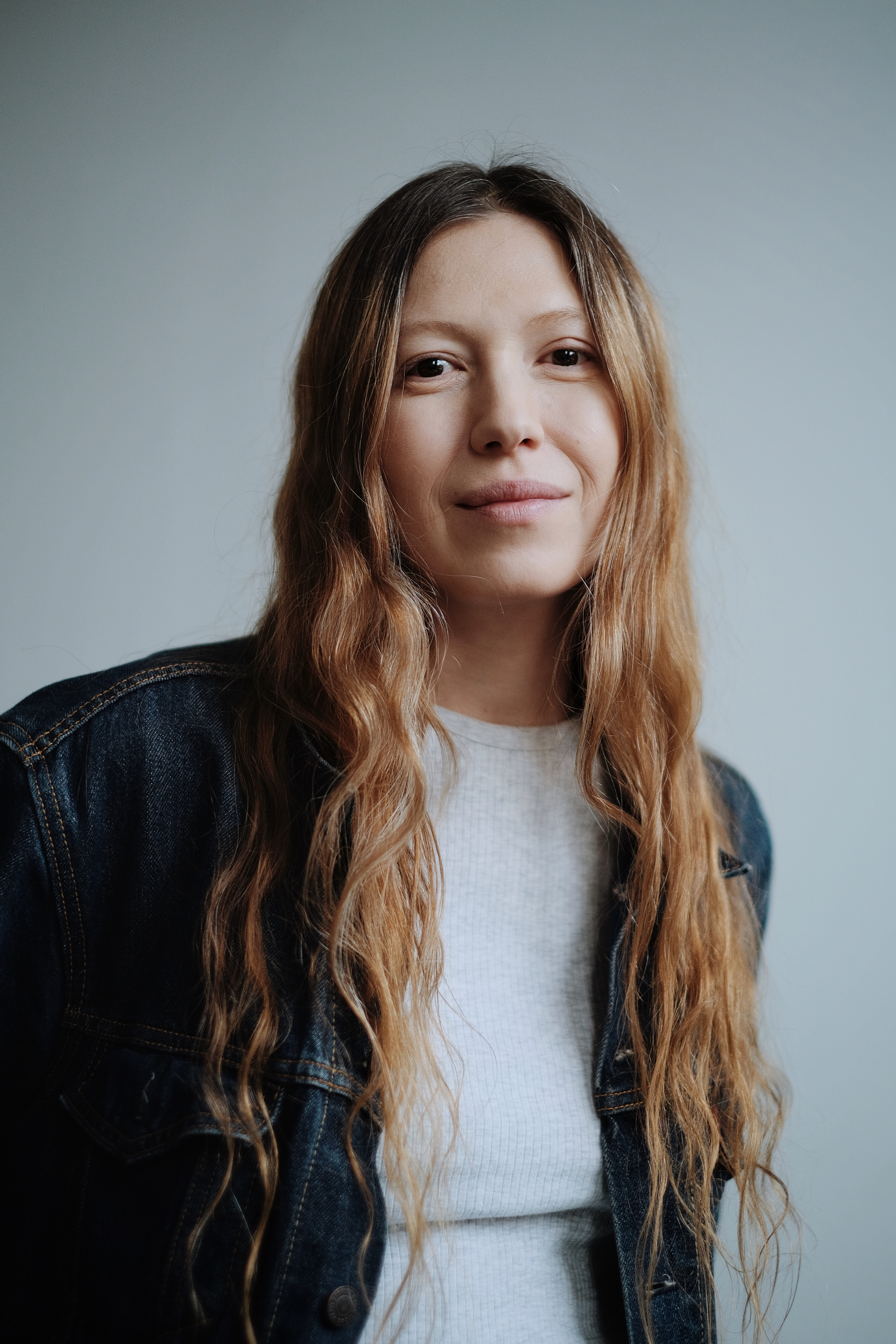
- Born: Vladlena Olegovna Sandu; August 17, 1982 (age 44); Feodosia, Crimea (then Soviet Union)
- Education: Rodchenko School of Photography and Multimedia; VGIK
- Occupations: Film director, screenwriter
- Years active: 2012–present
- Notable work: Holy God (2016); Eight Images from the Life of Nastya Sokolova (2018); Memory (2025)
- Website: vladlenasandu.com

Vladlena Olegovna Sandu (Russian: Владлена Олеговна Санду; born 17 August 1982) is a Crimea-born film director, screenwriter and theatre maker whose work explores memory, war and displacement.

After the start of the full-scale Russo-Ukrainian War in 2022, she relocated to the Netherlands and is based in Amsterdam.

== Early life and education ==
Sandu was born on 17 August 1982 in Feodosia and moved in childhood to Grozny after her parents’ divorce. She later described growing up amid the Chechen wars as formative for her work. She studied at the Rodchenko School of Photography and Multimedia in Moscow, later completing directing studies at the VGIK under Alexey Uchitel. She subsequently trained in theatre with Boris Yukhananov. In 2019, Sandu entered VGIK postgraduate studies in aesthetics and cultural theory and published scholarly essays related to film and culture.

== Career ==
Sandu’s student works circulated on the Russian festival circuit before drawing international attention with Holy God (2016), a documentary short about three generations of women displaced from Grozny. The film screened internationally and won the Movies that Matter Award at ZagrebDox 2017. Her short Eight Images from the Life of Nastya Sokolova (2018) premiered in the 2018 edition of the International Film Festival Rotterdam and later received the Silver Eye Award (short documentary category) from the Institute of Documentary Film at Ji.hlava’s East Silver Market.

From 2019 to 2022, Sandu co-created and worked as screenwriter, director and creative producer on the drama series Identification, which follows a young Russian woman who converts to Islam and confronts social frictions.

In 2022, she completed the short No Nation Without Culture, which screened at goEast in 2023 and won the RheinMain Short Film Award.

=== Memory (2025) ===
Sandu’s first feature-length documentary Memory received support from the Netherlands Film Fund + IDFA Bertha Fund Co-Production Scheme and was later presented as a Work-in-Progress at Visions du Réel Industry in April 2025.

The film premiered as the opening film of Giornate degli Autori at the 82nd Venice Film Festival. Damon Wise of Deadline Hollywood characterised it as a harrowing wartime memoir that fuses Sandu’s on-screen presence with stark imagery to evoke the rupture of childhood, and Elsa Keslassy of Variety described it as a personal film rooted in Sandu’s Chechen-war childhood. The film received the section’s People’s Choice Award (ex aequo).

== Filmography ==
- Diyana (2012)
- Orlovs (2013)
- Kira (2015)
- Tamerlan’s Love (2015)
- Holy God (2016)
- Eight Images from the Life of Nastya Sokolova (2018)
- No Nation Without Culture (2022)
- Memory (2025)

=== Festivals and awards ===
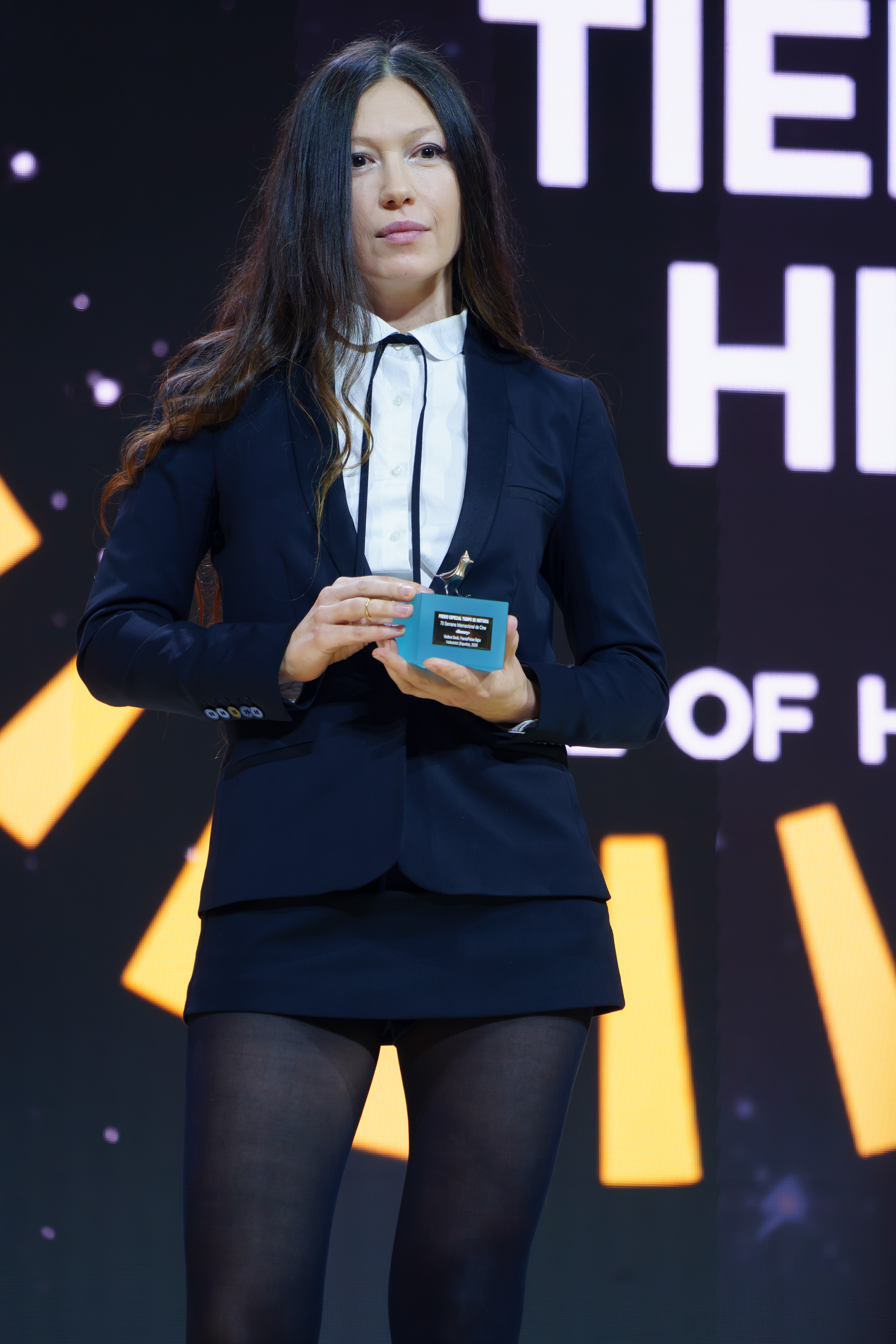
Sandu holding the 'Time of History' Special Prize obtained by Memory at the 70th Valladolid International Film Festival.

Year	Festival	Film	Award	Ref
2015	Kinotavr (Short Film Competition)	Kira	Special Jury Diploma (for the "completeness of the artistic expression")	
2015	VGIK International Student Film Festival	Kira	Best Director; Best Cinematography	
2016	Apricot Tree International Documentary Film Festival	Holy God	Grand Prix – Best Short Film	
2016	International Festival Signes de Nuit	Holy God	Special Mention – Night Award	
2017	ZagrebDox	Holy God	Movies That Matter Award	
2018	Silver Eye Awards (IDF/Ji.hlava)	Eight Images from the Life of Nastya Sokolova	Silver Eye Award – Best Short Documentary	
2023	GoEast – RheinMain Short Film Award	No Nation Without Culture	Winner	
2023	Amsterdam Fringe Festival	The Rainbow Cinema (theatre)	Best of Fringe 2023	
2025	Venice Days (Giornate degli Autori)	Memory	People’s Choice Award (ex aequo)	
