= Saudi Runaway =

2020 Saudi Arabian documentary film

- Directed by: Susanne Regina Meures
- Written by: Susanne Regina Meures
- Release date: 2020
- Running time: 88 minutes
- Country: Switzerland
- Language: Arabic

Saudi Runaway is a 2020 Swiss documentary film, directed and written by Susanne Regina Meures. The film shows a young woman in Saudi Arabia filming herself as she attempts to flee before her arranged wedding. It was bought by National Geographic.

The film had its world premiere at the Sundance Film Festival on January 25, 2020.

The cinematographer filmed her story using 2 smartphones. It is unusual in that the cinematographer is the same as the main character. The main character is only known as Muna to protect her identity.

== Reception ==
The Guardian describes the film as a suspenseful and courageous documentary. It has an 83% rating on Rotten Tomatoes.
