= Kamal Aljafari =

Palestinian filmmaker and artist (born 1972)

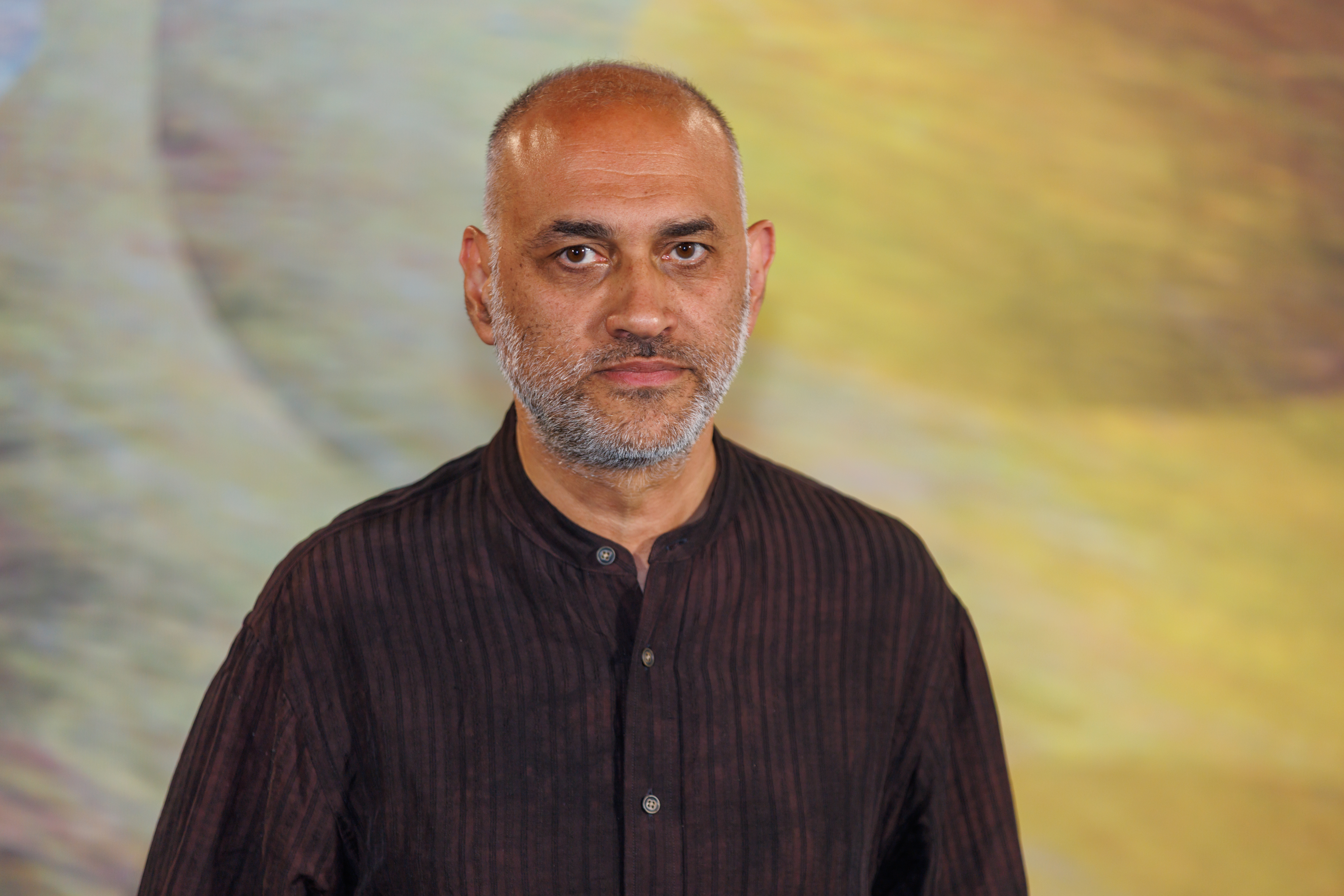
- Aljafari at the 78th Locarno Film Festival in 2025
- Born: 1972 (age 53–54); Ramla, Israel
- Education: Academy of Media Arts Cologne
- Occupations: Filmmaker; producer
- Website: kamalaljafari.art

Kamal Aljafari (Note: Also written as Kamal Jafari) (Arabic: كمال الجعفري; born 1972) is a Palestinian filmmaker and visual artist.

== Early life ==
Aljafari was born to a Palestinian family in Ramla. His maternal family is from Jaffa, while his paternal family is from Ramla; both families were internally displaced and resettled to homes that had previously belonged to other Palestinians.

He attended a Catholic school in Jaffa as a child. As a teenager, he served time at a juvenile prison in the Naqab desert during the First Intifada. He later attended university in Jerusalem before leaving Israel for Germany at the age of 26. He graduated from the Academy of Media Arts Cologne. He was based in New York City and Berlin before moving to Paris.

== Career ==
Aljafari directed his first short film, Visit Iraq (2003), while a film student in Germany. In 2009, he was a featured artist at the Robert Flaherty Film Seminar, and was later a Benjamin White Whitney Scholar at Harvard University from 2009 to 2010. His film A Fidai Film (2024) premiered in the Burning Lights competition of Visions du Réel, where it won the Jury Award. His film With Hasan in Gaza (2025) premiered in the international competition of the 78th Locarno Film Festival, where it was nominated for the Golden Leopard.

He has served on the juries of:

- Torino Film Festival, International Documentary competition (2016)
- Locarno Film Festival, Leopards of Tomorrow competition (2021)
- IndieLisboa (2024)
- 32nd Sarajevo Film Festival, Competition Program – Documentary Film

== Filmography ==
Year	Title	Director	Writer	Producer	Notes	Ref.
2003	Visit Iraq	Yes	Yes	Yes	Short film	
2006	The Roof	Yes	Yes	Yes		
2007	Balconies	Yes	Yes	Yes	Short film	
2010	Port of Memory	Yes	Yes	No		
2015	Recollection	Yes	Yes	Yes		
2019	It's a Long Way from Amphioxus	Yes	Yes	Yes	Short film	
2020	An Unusual Summer	Yes	Yes	Yes		
2022	Paradiso, XXXI, 108	Yes	Yes	Yes	Short film	
2024	A Fidai Film	Yes	Yes	Yes		
2024	UNDR	Yes	Yes	Yes	Short film	
2025	With Hasan in Gaza	Yes	Yes	Yes		

== Awards and nominations ==
Award	Year	Category	Nominated work	Result	Ref.
Camden International Film Festival	2024	Cinematic Vision Award	A Fidai Film	Won	
Cinéma du Réel	2010	Louis Marcorelles Award	Port of Memory	Won	
Clermont-Ferrand International Short Film Festival	2023	Lab Competition Grand Prix	Paradiso, XXXI, 108	Nominated	
Dokufest	2024	International Dox Award	A Fidai Film	Won	
Dubai International Film Festival	2015	Best Non-Fiction Feature	Recollection	Nominated	
FIDMarseille	2024	Ciné+ Distribution Aid Prize	A Fidai Film	Won	
FIDMarseille	2024	Renaud Victor Award	A Fidai Film	Won	
German Film Critics Association Awards	2023	Best Experimental	Paradiso, XXXI, 108	Won	
Guanajuato International Film Festival	2023	Best Experimental Short Film	Paradiso, XXXI, 108	Nominated	
Indie Memphis Film Festival	2024	Best Departures Feature	A Fidai Film	Nominated	
International Cinephile Society Awards	2025	Best Documentary	A Fidai Film	Nominated	
Lanzarote Film Festival	2024	Best Feature Film	A Fidai Film	Won	
Locarno Film Festival	2022	Leopards of Tomorrow Auteur Competition	Paradiso, XXXI, 108	Nominated	
Locarno Film Festival	2025	Golden Leopard	With Hasan in Gaza	Pending	
Luxembourg City Film Festival	2025	Documentary Award	A Fidai Film	Nominated	
Mar del Plata International Film Festival	2024	Altered States Competition	A Fidai Film	Nominated	
Montreal International Documentary Festival	2024	Best International Feature	A Fidai Film	Nominated	
Torino Film Festival	2015	Best International Documentary Film	Recollection	Nominated	
Valladolid International Film Festival	2024	Best Documentary	A Fidai Film	Nominated	
Visions du Réel	2024	Burning Lights Jury Award	A Fidai Film	Won	
Yerevan International Film Festival	2024	Regional Panorama	A Fidai Film	Nominated	
