= With Hasan in Gaza =

2025 documentary film by Kamal Aljafari

- International promotional poster
- Arabic: معحسن في غزّة
- Directed by: Kamal Aljafari
- Produced by: Kamal Aljafari
- Cinematography: Kamal Aljafari
- Edited by: Kamal Aljafari
- Music by: Simon Fisher Turner; Attila Faravelli
- Production companies: CNAP/Image-Mouvement; Chrysalis Fellowship; Columbia Institute for Ideas and Imagination; Doha Film Institute; Gwaertler Stiftung; Kamal Aljafari Studio; L'atelier 105; Light Cone; Media City Film Festival
- Distributed by: Grandfilm (Germany)
- Release dates: 7 August 2025 (Locarno); 26 March 2026 (Germany)
- Running time: 106 minutes
- Countries: Palestine; Germany; Switzerland; France; Qatar
- Language: Arabic

With Hasan in Gaza (Arabic: مع حسن في غزّة, romanized: Maʻa Ḥasan fī Ġazzah) is a 2025 documentary film produced, edited and directed by Kamal Aljafari. It documents Gaza Strip daily life in late 2001, documenting the tension between the IDF and the Palestinian population during the Second Intifada (2000–2005).

The film had its world premiere in the main competition of the 78th Locarno Film Festival on 7 August 2025, where it was nominated for the Golden Leopard.

== Premise ==
In November 2001, amid the Second Intifada, director Kamal Aljafari began documenting his search for a man he had been imprisoned with during 1989 in Gaza; accompanied by Hasan Elboubou, the duo documents the daily life of the Palestinian population and the high tension imposed by the IDF forces.

Aljafari only rediscovered the footage stored on three MiniDV tapes many years later.

== Production ==
Aljafari called the film "an homage to Gaza and its people, to all that was erased and that came back to me in this urgent moment of Palestinian existence, or non-existence. It is a film about the catastrophe, and the poetry that resists."

In June 2025, the film received a grant from the Doha Film Institute.

== Release ==
A trailer for the film was released on 31 July 2025. The film had its world premiere at the 78th Locarno Film Festival on 7 August 2025. It was later screened at the Toronto International Film Festival and the BFI London Film Festival. It will also open Festival dei Popoli in November 2025.

== Reception ==
Amber Wilkinson of Screen Daily called the film "a raw but poignant snapshot of Gaza during the Second Intifada".

Writing for Cineuropa, Davide Abbatescianni argued that the film "serves less as an artistic experiment and more as a testament left by a witness," which "invites us to consider how cinema can preserve – and perhaps restore – spaces that have been physically destroyed but must remain alive in memory."

=== Accolades ===
Award	Year	Category	Recipient(s)	Result	Ref.
Locarno Film Festival	2025	Golden Leopard	With Hasan in Gaza	Nominated	
Locarno Film Festival	2025	Europa Cinemas Label	With Hasan in Gaza	Won	
