= Songs of Slow Burning Earth =

- Directed by: Olha Zhurba
- Produced by: Darya Bassel
- Cinematography: Volodymyr Usyk; Viacheslav Tsvietkov; Misha Lubarsky
- Edited by: Michael Aaglund
- Music by: Yaroslav Tatarchenko
- Release date: 4 September 2024 (Venice)
- Countries: Ukraine; Denmark; Sweden; France

Songs of Slow Burning Earth is a 2024 documentary film written and directed by Olha Zhurba. A co-production between Ukraine, Denmark, Sweden and France, it had its world premiere at the 81st edition of the Venice Film Festival.

== Synopsis ==
The documentary depicts life in Ukraine during the first two years of the Russian invasion. Through observational footage filmed across the country, it follows civilians, soldiers, volunteers and families as they experience displacement, loss and the gradual normalization of wartime conditions. Rather than focusing on a single individual, the film presents a series of everyday moments that show how the conflict reshapes Ukrainian society.

== Production ==
The film was an international co-production by Moon Man, Final Cut for Real and We Have a Plan.

== Release ==
The film premiered out of competition at the 81st Venice International Film Festival.

== Reception ==
The film was awarded best film at the 11th Riga International Film Festival and at the 22nd Big Sky Documentary Film Festival, and won the Jury Award for Best Film at the 27th One World International Human Rights Film Festival. Marc van de Klashorst from International Cinephile Society described the film as "a powerful document of the horrors of war and the resilience of humanity", and wrote: "not only is the compositional work strong, Zhurba also has a knack for making human drama play out in such a way that it becomes a gut punch".
