= Treptow Arena =

Venue in Berlin, Germany

Coordinates: 52.496910°N 13.454040°E

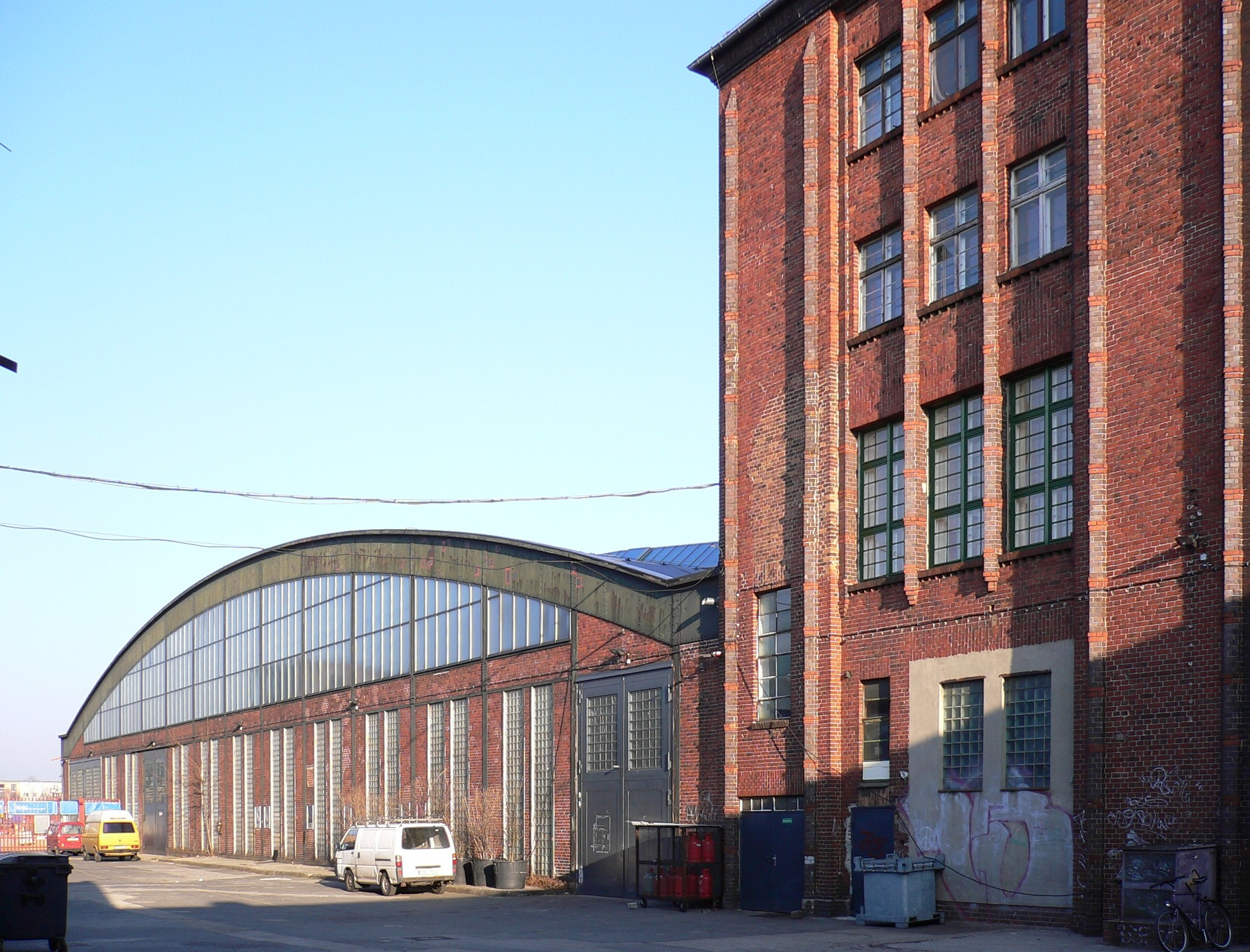
Arena-Halle

The Treptow Arena (pronounced [tʁɛptoː], with a silent w) (also Arena Berlin) is an indoor hall, that hosts concerts, parties and special events, such as car presentations. It can hold up to 7,500. It is located in Berlin, Treptow next to the Spree.
