= Georgi Aleksi-Meskhishvili =

Georgian set designer and artist (born 1941)

Georgi "Gogi" Aleksi-Meskhishvili (Georgian: გოგი ალექსი-მესხიშვილი; born March 2, 1941) is a Georgian set designer and artist. He is the great-grandson of the prominent Georgian actor Lado Aleksi-Meskhishvili and has been named an honorary citizen of Tbilisi, Georgia.

Born in Tbilisi, Aleksi-Meskhishvili graduated from the Tbilisi State Academy of Arts in 1967. From 1971 to 1995 he was the chief set designer for the Rustaveli Theatre and, from 1986 to 1995, also for the Tbilisi Opera and Ballet Theatre, where he provided the scenery and costumes for over 200 productions. Many of his shows toured internationally, and he was hired as a professor of stage design at Dartmouth College in 1996. He relocated to New York City, and co-founded the Synetic Theater in Virginia. Among his many awards is the European Film Award (Felix) for the 1988 film Ashik Kerib by Sergei Parajanov.
