= Shooting Star (2015 film) =

Shooting Star Падаща звезда
- Directed by: Lyubo Yonchev
- Written by: Yassen Genadiev, Lyubo Yonchev
- Produced by: Lyubo Yonchev, Lyubo Kirov, Carola Jessica de Lucia
- Starring: Stefka Yanorova, Stefan Popov, Kalia Kamenova
- Cinematography: Damian Dimitrov
- Edited by: Lyubo Kirov
- Music by: Alexander Kostov
- Production companies: Crystal Frame, Mito Production
- Distributed by: Crystal Frame
- Release date: October 2015 (Sose International Film Festival)
- Running time: 28 minutes
- Countries: Bulgaria, Italy
- Language: Bulgarian

Shooting Star is a short film co-produced between Bulgaria and Italy starring Stefka Yanorova, Stefan Popov and Kalia Kamenova written and directed by Lyubo Yonchev.

== Synopsis ==
Lilly is a divorced mother of two – Martin, who has recently come of age, and the little Alexandra. One cold winter evening Martin takes Alexandra from kindergarten. In the dark streets of the neighborhood they become a part of a tragic accident that hardly can be forgotten or erased. Lilly and her kids have to make tough decisions, the consequences of which will change their life for good.
