= Alice Normington =

British production designer

Alice Normington is a British production designer known for her work on films and television series such as Nowhere Boy, The Secret World of Michael Fry, and Suffragette. She won a BAFTA Award in 1998 for her work on the BBC television series The Woman in White. Normington is a graduate of the Wimbledon School of Art and teaches at The London Film School.

== Selected filmography ==
- Love and Other Disasters (2006)
- Nowhere Boy (2009)
- Suffragette (2015)
- Their Finest (2017)
