= Ashik Kerib (film) =

1988 film by Sergei Parajanov

- original Russian film poster
- Directed by: Dodo Abashidze; Sergei Parajanov
- Screenplay by: Gia Badridze
- Based on: Ashik Kerib by Mikhail Lermontov
- Starring: Yuri Mgoyan; Sofiko Chiaureli; Ramaz Chkhikvadze; Konstantin Stepankov
- Cinematography: Albert Yavuryan
- Music by: Cavanşir Quliyev
- Production company: Kartuli Pilmi
- Release date: 1988
- Running time: 73 minutes
- Country: Soviet Union
- Languages: Russian; Georgian; Azerbaijani

Ashik Kerib (Georgian: აშიკ-ქერიბი, literally "strange ashik"), sometimes known internationally as The Lovelorn Minstrel, is a 1988 Soviet art film directed by Dodo Abashidze and Sergei Parajanov that is based on the short story of the same name by Mikhail Lermontov. It was Parajanov's last completed film and was dedicated to his close friend Andrei Tarkovsky, who had died two years previously. The film also features a detailed portrayal of Azerbaijani culture.

== Plot ==
An ashik wants to marry his beloved, but her father opposes since he is poor and he expects rich prospects for his 'daughter from heaven'. She vows to wait for him for a thousand days and nights until he comes back with enough money to impress her father. He sets out on a journey to gain wealth and encounters many difficulties, but with the help of a saintly horseman, he returns to his beloved on the 1001st day and they are able to marry.

== Style ==
The entire story is told in a way of Azerbaijan folklore with music and colour playing a key role. Dialogue is minimal and scripts are used to narrate the plot changes. The director included intentional anachronisms such as the use of submachine guns and a movie camera.

== Themes ==
Parajanov's previous three major films, Shadows of Forgotten Ancestors, The Color of Pomegranates, and The Legend of Suram Fortress, were colourful illustrations of Ukrainian, Armenian, and Georgian culture respectively. Ashik Kerib similarly explores traditional Azerbaijani clothes, music, dance, art and customs.

== Music ==
For the soundtrack, Azerbaijani composer Cavanşir Quliyev was hired, whose soundtrack features Alim Qasimov, a master of the classical genre of Mugham (multi-movement suites with improvisations on conventional modal scales). The soundtrack includes instrumental music, electronic music, traditional ashugh music, and even a passage from Schubert's Ave Maria.

== Awards ==
- 1988 — Cahiers du Cinéma: Nominee for best film, won ninth place.
- 1988 — Felix Award: Presented to the artists Georgi Aleksi-Meskhishvili, Niko Zandukeli and Shota Gogolashvili.
- 1989 — Istanbul International Film Festival: Special Prize of the Jury (to Sergei Parajanov)
- 1990 — Nika Award:
  - Best Live-action Film and Best Director (both to Dodo Abashidze & Sergei Parajanov)
  - Best Cinematography (to Albert Yavuryan)
  - Best Production Designer (to Sergei Parajanov)
