= European Film Academy Award of Excellence =

The following is a list of the European Film Award winners and nominees for Special Aspect Award or for Prix d'Excellence Award. This category contains different aspects of cinematography works which were not mentioned in other categories during the ceremony show.

== Winners and nominees ==
Year	Winner and nominees	English title	Original title	Nomination Work
1988 (1st)	Special Aspect Award			
1988 (1st)	(Soviet Union) Georgi Aleksi-Meskhishvili (Soviet Union) Niko Sanukeli (Soviet Union) Schota Gogolaschwili	Ashik Kerib	აშიკ-ქერიბი	Art Direction
1988 (1st)	(France) Henri Alekan	Wings of Desire	Der Himmel über Berlin	Camera
1988 (1st)	(Portugal) Mário Barroso	The Cannibals	Os Canibais	Camera
1988 (1st)	(United Kingdom) Terence Davies	Distant Voices, Still Lives		Music
1988 (1st)	(Spain) Félix Murcia	Women on the Verge of a Nervous Breakdown	Mujeres al borde de un ataque de nervios	Art Direction
1993 (6th)	European Achievement of the Year			
1993 (6th)	(United Kingdom) Nik Powell (United Kingdom) Stephen Woolley	The Crying Game		Production
1993 (6th)	(France) Benoît Poelvoorde	Man Bites Dog	C'est arrivé près de chez vous	Actor, additionally to the team-work in Writing, Producing and Directing
1993 (6th)	(Georgia (country)) / (France) Otar Iosseliani	Chasing Butterflies	La Chasse aux papillons	Author
2006 (19th)	European Film Academy Award For An Artistic Contribution			
2006 (19th)	(France) Pierre Pell (France) Stéphane Rozenbaum	The Science of Sleep		Production design
2007 (20th)	Prix d'Excellence			
2007 (20th)	(Germany) Uli Hanisch	Perfume: The Story of a Murderer	Das Parfum – Die Geschichte Eines Mörders	Production Design
2007 (20th)	(Germany) Annette Focks (Germany) Jörg Höhne (Germany) Robin Pohle (Germany) Andreas Ruft	Four Minutes	Vier Minuten	Sound Effects
2007 (20th)	(France) Didier Lavergne	La Vie en rose	La Môme	Make up
2007 (20th)	(Italy) Francesca Sartori	Alatriste		Costume
2007 (20th)	(United Kingdom) Lucia Zucchetti	The Queen		Editing
2008 (21st)	Prix d'Excellence			
2008 (21st)	(Poland) Magdalena Biedrzycka	Katyń		Costume Design
2008 (21st)	(France) Laurence Briaud	A Christmas Tale	Un conte de Noël	Editing
2008 (21st)	(Hungary) Márton Ágh	Delta		Production Design
2008 (21st)	(Norway) Petter Fladeby	O' Horten		Sound Design
2009 (22nd)	Prix d'Excellence			
2009 (22nd)	(France) Brigitte Taillandier (France) Francis Wargnier (France) Jean-Paul Hurier (France) Marc Doisne	A Prophet	Un prophète	Sound Design
2009 (22nd)	(Poland) Waldemar Pokromski	The Baader Meinhof Complex	Der Baader Meinhof Komplex	Make Up and Hair
2009 (22nd)	(France) Catherine Leterrier	Coco Before Chanel	Coco avant Chanel	Costume Design
2009 (22nd)	(Italy) Francesca Calvelli	Win	Vincere	Editing
