= 19th European Film Awards =

2006 film awards ceremony in Poland

- Date: December 2, 2006
- Site: Centrum EXPO XXI, Warsaw, Poland
- Hosted by: Maciej Stuhr, Sophie Marceau
- Organized by: European Film Academy

Highlights
- Best Picture: The Lives Of Others
- Best Direction: Pedro Almodóvar; Volver
- Best Actor: Ulrich Mühe; The Lives Of Others
- Best Actress: Penélope Cruz; Volver
- Most awards: Volver (4)
- Most nominations: Volver (6), The Lives Of Others

Television coverage
- Channel: Arte, TVP2

The 19th European Film Awards were presented on December 2, 2006 in Warsaw, Poland. The winners were selected by the members of the European Film Academy.

== Awards ==
=== Best Film ===
English title	Original title	Director(s)	Country
The Lives of Others	Das Leben der Anderen	Florian Henckel von Donnersmarck	Germany
Breakfast on Pluto		Neil Jordan	Ireland, United Kingdom
Grbavica: Esma's Secret	Grbavica	Jasmila Žbanić	Bosnia and Herzegovina, Austria, Germany, Croatia
The Road to Guantanamo		Michael Winterbottom and Mat Whitecross	United Kingdom
Volver		Pedro Almodóvar	Spain
The Wind That Shakes the Barley		Ken Loach	Ireland, United Kingdom, Germany, Italy, Spain

=== Best Director ===
Director(s)	English title	Original title
(Spain) Pedro Almodóvar	Volver	
(Denmark) Susanne Bier	After the Wedding	Efter brylluppet
(Germany) Florian Henckel von Donnersmarck	The Lives of Others	Das Leben der Anderen
(United Kingdom) Michael Winterbottom (United Kingdom) Mat Whitecross	The Road to Guantanamo	
(United Kingdom) Ken Loach	The Wind That Shakes the Barley	

=== Best Screenwriter ===
Screenwriter(s)	English title	Original title
(Germany) Florian Henckel von Donnersmarck	The Lives of Others	Das Leben der Anderen
(Romania) Corneliu Porumboiu	12:08 East of Bucharest	A fost sau n-a fost?
(United Kingdom) Paul Laverty	The Wind That Shakes the Barley	
(Spain) Pedro Almodóvar	Volver	

=== Best Actor ===
Actor	English title	Original title
(Germany) Ulrich Mühe	The Lives of Others	Das Leben der Anderen
(Denmark) Mads Mikkelsen	After the Wedding	Efter brylluppet
(Republic of Ireland) Cillian Murphy	Breakfast on Pluto	Breakfast on Pluto
(Denmark) Jesper Christensen	Manslaughter	Drabet
(France) Patrick Chesnais	Not Here to Be Loved	Je ne suis pas là pour être aimé
(Italy) Silvio Orlando	The Caiman	Il caimano

=== Best Actress ===
Actress	English title	Original title
(Spain) Penelope Cruz	Volver	Volver
(Serbia) Mirjana Karanović	Grbavica: Esma's Secret	Grbavica
(Germany) Sandra Hüller	Requiem	Requiem
(Germany) Martina Gedeck	The Lives of Others	Das Leben der Anderen
(Canada) Sarah Polley	The Secret Life of Words	La vida secreta de las palabras

=== Best Documentary ===
English title	Original title	Director(s)	Country
Into Great Silence	Die große Stille	Philip Gröning	Germany
37 Uses for a Dead Sheep		Ben Hopkins	United Kingdom
Dreaming by Numbers		Anna Bucchetti	Netherlands
Grandmother's House	La casa de mi abuela	Adan Allaga	Spain
Maradona, the Golden Kid	Maradona, un gamin en or	Jean-Christophe Rosé	France
The Cemetery Club	מועדון בית הקברות	Tali Shemesh	Israel
The Fisherman and the Dancing Girl	Рыбак и танцовщица	Valeriy Solomin	Russia
Our Daily Bread	Unser täglich Brot	Nikolaus Geyrhalter	Austria

=== European Discovery ===
English title	Original title	Director(s)	Country
13 Tzameti		(Georgia (country)) Géla Babluani	France
Fresh Air	Friss levegö	(Hungary) Ágnes Kocsis	Hungary
Pingpong		(Germany) Matthias Luthardt	Germany
Retrieval	Z odzysku	Slawomir Fabicki	Poland

=== Best Cinematographer ===
Cinematographer(s)	English title	Original title
(United Kingdom) Barry Ackroyd	The Wind That Shakes the Barley	
(Spain) José Luis Alcaine	Volver	
(Finland) Timo Salminen	Lights in the Dusk	Laitakaupungin valot
(United Kingdom) Roman Osin	Pride & Prejudice	

=== Best Composer ===
Editor(s)	English title	Original title
(Spain) Alberto Iglesias	Volver	
(Finland) Tuomas Kantelinen	Mother of Mine	Äideistä parhain
(Italy) Dario Marianelli	Pride & Prejudice	
(Lebanon) (France) Gabriel Yared (France) Stéphane Moucha	The Lives of Others	Das Leben der Anderen
