= Satellite Award for Best Actress in a Motion Picture =

Annual film award

Satellite Award for Best Actress
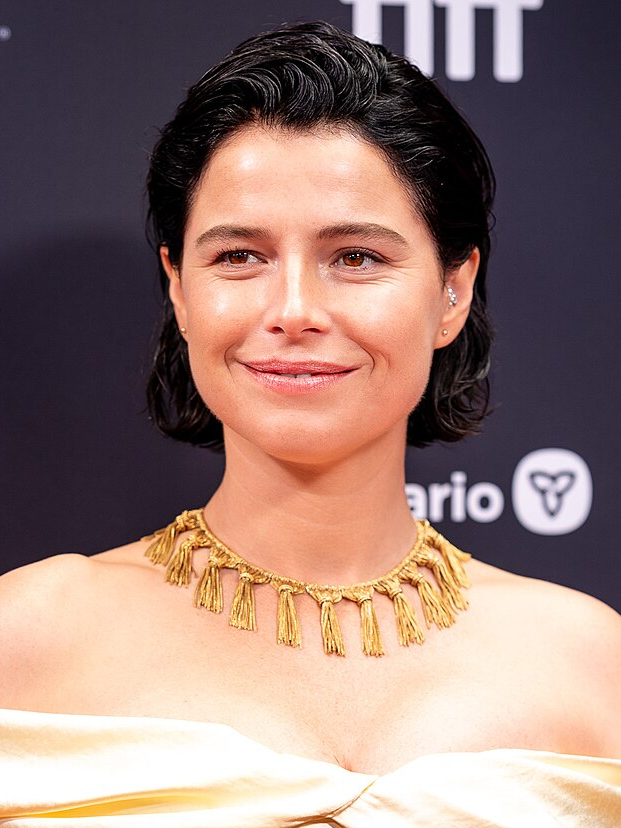
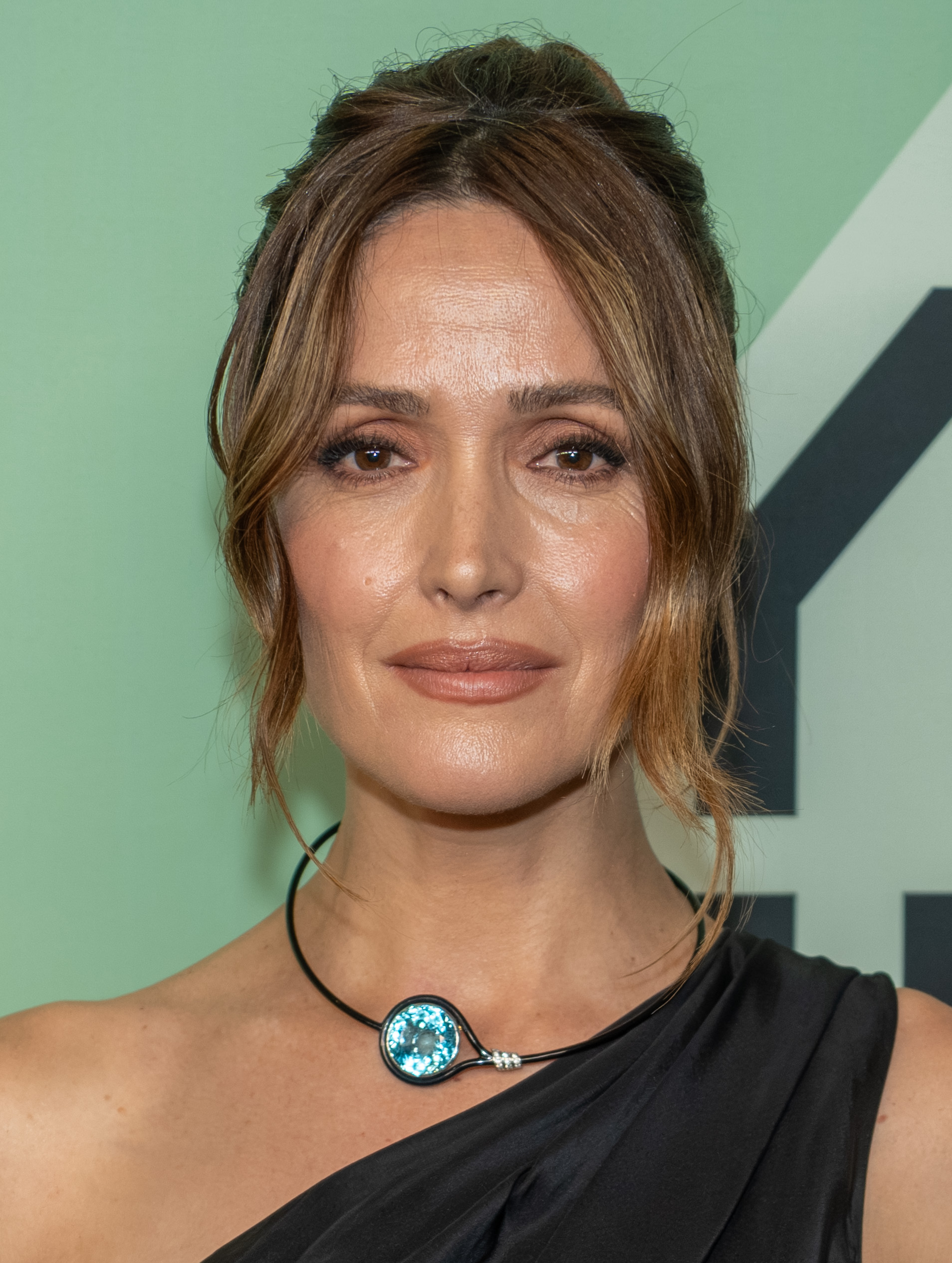
- The 2025 recipients: Jessie Buckley and Rose Byrne
- Awarded for: Best Actress in a Drama Motion Picture; Best Actress in a Comedy or Musical Motion Picture
- Country: United States
- Presented by: International Press Academy
- First award: 1996
- Currently held by: Drama: Jessie Buckley – Hamnet (2025); Comedy or Musical: Rose Byrne – If I Had Legs I'd Kick You (2025)
- Website: http://www.pressacademy.com/

The Satellite Award for Best Actress in a Motion Picture is one of the annual awards given by the International Press Academy. The category has gone through several changes since its inception.

- From 1996 to 2010, two categories based on genre were presented, Best Actress – Motion Picture Drama and Best Actress – Motion Picture Comedy or Musical
- In 2011, the IPA pared down its Satellite nominations in the motion picture categories from 22 to 19 classifications; the change reflects the merger of drama and comedy under a general Best Picture heading, including the Best Actor/Actress headings and the Supporting headings.
- In 2016 and 2017, two winners were announced within the Best Actor category, one for the performance by an actor in a major studio film and other for a performance in an independent film.

Since 2018, the two categories based on genre are presented again replacing the Best Actor in a Motion Picture category for the Best Actor – Motion Picture Drama and Best Actor – Motion Picture Comedy or Musical categories previously presented.

== Winners and nominees ==
=== Best Actress – Motion Picture Drama (1996–2010, 2018–present) ===
Year	Actress	Film	Role
1996	Frances McDormand	Fargo	Marge Gunderson
1996	Brenda Blethyn	Secrets & Lies	Cynthia Rose Purley
1996	Robin Wright Penn	Moll Flanders	Moll Flanders
1996	Kristin Scott Thomas	The English Patient	Katharine Clifton
1996	Emily Watson	Breaking the Waves	Bess McNeill
1997	Judi Dench	Mrs. Brown	Queen Victoria
1997	Joan Allen	The Ice Storm	Elena Hood
1997	Helena Bonham Carter	The Wings of the Dove	Kate Croy
1997	Julie Christie	Afterglow	Phyllis Mann
1997	Kate Winslet	Titanic	Rose DeWitt-Bukater
1998	Cate Blanchett	Elizabeth	Queen Elizabeth
1998	Helena Bonham Carter	The Theory of Flight	Jane Hatchard
1998	Fernanda Montenegro	Central Station (Central do Brasil)	Isadora "Dora" Teixeira
1998	Susan Sarandon	Stepmom	Jackie Harrison
1998	Meryl Streep	One True Thing	Kate Gulden
1998	Emily Watson	Hilary and Jackie	Jacqueline "Jackie" du Pré
1999	Hilary Swank	Boys Don't Cry	Brandon Teena
1999	Annette Bening	American Beauty	Carolyn Burnham
1999	Elaine Cassidy	Felicia's Journey	Felicia
1999	Nicole Kidman	Eyes Wide Shut	Alice Harford
1999	Youki Kudoh	Snow Falling on Cedars	Hatsue Miyamoto
1999	Sigourney Weaver	A Map of the World	Alice Goodwin
2000	Ellen Burstyn	Requiem for a Dream	Sara Goldfarb
2000	Joan Allen	The Contender	Laine Hanson
2000	Gillian Anderson	The House of Mirth	Lily Bart
2000	Björk	Dancer in the Dark	Selma Jezkova
2000	Laura Linney	You Can Count on Me	Samantha Prescott
2000	Julia Roberts	Erin Brockovich	Erin Brockovich
2001	Sissy Spacek	In the Bedroom	Ruth Fowler
2001	Cate Blanchett	Charlotte Gray	Charlotte Gray
2001	Judi Dench	Iris	Iris Murdoch
2001	Halle Berry	Monster's Ball	Leticia Musgrove
2001	Nicole Kidman	The Others	Grace Stewart
2001	Tilda Swinton	The Deep End	Margaret Hall
2002	Diane Lane	Unfaithful	Connie Sumner
2002	Salma Hayek	Frida	Frida Kahlo
2002	Nicole Kidman	The Hours	Virginia Woolf
2002	Julianne Moore	Far from Heaven	Cathy Whitaker
2002	Sigourney Weaver	The Guys	Joan
2002	Meryl Streep	The Hours	Clarissa Vaughan
2003	Charlize Theron	Monster	Aileen Wuornos
2003	Toni Collette	Japanese Story	Sandy Edwards
2003	Jennifer Connelly	House of Sand and Fog	Kathy Nicolo
2003	Samantha Morton	In America	Sarah
2003	Nikki Reed	Thirteen	Evie Zamora
2003	Naomi Watts	21 Grams	Cristina Peck
2003	Evan Rachel Wood	Thirteen	Tracy Louise Freeland
2004	Hilary Swank	Million Dollar Baby	Maggie Fitzgerald
2004	Laura Linney	P.S.	Louise Harrington
2004	Catalina Sandino Moreno	Maria Full of Grace (Maria llena eres de gracia)	Maria Álvarez
2004	Imelda Staunton	Vera Drake	Vera Drake
2004	Uma Thurman	Kill Bill: Volume 2	Beatrix Kiddo
2004	Sigourney Weaver	Imaginary Heroes	Sandy Travis
2005	Felicity Huffman	Transamerica	Stanley Schupak / Sabrina "Bree" Osbourne
2005	Toni Collette	In Her Shoes	Rose Feller
2005	Julianne Moore	The Prize Winner of Defiance, Ohio	Evelyn Ryan
2005	Charlize Theron	North Country	Josey Aimes
2005	Robin Wright Penn	Nine Lives	Diana
2005	Zhang Ziyi	Memoirs of a Geisha	Chiyo Sakamoto / Sayuri Nitta
2006	Helen Mirren	The Queen	Queen Elizabeth II
2006	Penélope Cruz	To Return (Volver)	Raimunda
2006	Judi Dench	Notes on a Scandal	Barbara Covett
2006	Maggie Gyllenhaal	Sherrybaby	Sherry Swanson
2006	Gretchen Mol	The Notorious Bettie Page	Bettie Page
2006	Kate Winslet	Little Children	Sarah Pierce
2007	Marion Cotillard	La Vie en Rose (La môme)	Édith Piaf
2007	Julie Christie	Away from Her	Fiona Anderson
2007	Angelina Jolie	A Mighty Heart	Mariane Pearl
2007	Keira Knightley	Atonement	Cecilia Tallis
2007	Laura Linney	The Savages	Wendy Savage
2007	Tilda Swinton	Stephanie Daley	Lydie Crane
2008	Angelina Jolie	Changeling	Christine Collins
2008	Anne Hathaway	Rachel Getting Married	Kym
2008	Melissa Leo	Frozen River	Ray Eddy
2008	Meryl Streep	Doubt	Aloysius Beauvier
2008	Kristin Scott Thomas	I've Loved You So Long (Il y a longtemps que je t'aime)	Juliette Fontaine
2008	Kate Winslet	The Reader	Hanna Schmitz
2009	Shohreh Aghdashloo	The Stoning of Soraya M.	Zahra
2009	Emily Blunt	The Young Victoria	Queen Victoria
2009	Abbie Cornish	Bright Star	Fanny Brawne
2009	Penélope Cruz	Broken Embraces (Los abrazos rotos)	Magdalena "Lena" Rivas
2009	Carey Mulligan	An Education	Jenny Miller
2009	Catalina Saavedra	The Maid (La nana)	Raquel
2010	Noomi Rapace	The Girl with the Dragon Tattoo	Lisbeth Salander
2010	Nicole Kidman	Rabbit Hole	Becca Corbett
2010	Jennifer Lawrence	Winter's Bone	Ree Dolly
2010	Helen Mirren	The Tempest	Prospera
2010	Natalie Portman	Black Swan	Nina Sayers
2010	Tilda Swinton	I Am Love	Emma Recchi
2010	Naomi Watts	Fair Game	Valerie Plame
2010	Michelle Williams	Blue Valentine	Cindy Heller
2018	Glenn Close	The Wife	Joan Castleman
2018	Yalitza Aparicio	Roma	Cleo
2018	Viola Davis	Widows	Veronica Rawlings
2018	Nicole Kidman	Destroyer	Erin Bell
2018	Melissa McCarthy	Can You Ever Forgive Me?	Lee Israel
2018	Rosamund Pike	A Private War	Marie Colvin
2019	Scarlett Johansson	Marriage Story	Nicole Barber
2019	Cynthia Erivo	Harriet	Harriet Tubman
2019	Helen Mirren	The Good Liar	Betty McLeish
2019	Charlize Theron	Bombshell	Megyn Kelly
2019	Alfre Woodard	Clemency	Bernadine Williams
2019	Renée Zellweger	Judy	Judy Garland
2020	Frances McDormand	Nomadland	Fern
2020	Viola Davis	Ma Rainey's Black Bottom	Ma Rainey
2020	Vanessa Kirby	Pieces of a Woman	Martha Weiss
2020	Sophia Loren	The Life Ahead	Madame Rosa
2020	Carey Mulligan	Promising Young Woman	Cassandra "Cassie" Thomas
2020	Kate Winslet	Ammonite	Mary Anning
2021	Kristen Stewart	Spencer	Princess Diana
2021	Jessica Chastain	The Eyes of Tammy Faye	Tammy Faye Bakker
2021	Olivia Colman	The Lost Daughter	Leda Caruso
2021	Penélope Cruz	Parallel Mothers	Janis Martínez
2021	Lady Gaga	House of Gucci	Patrizia Reggiani
2021	Nicole Kidman	Being the Ricardos	Lucille Ball
2022	Danielle Deadwyler	Till	Mamie Till
2022	Cate Blanchett	Tár	Lydia Tár
2022	Jessica Chastain	The Good Nurse	Amy Loughren
2022	Viola Davis	The Woman King	General Nanisca
2022	Vicky Krieps	Corsage	Empress Elisabeth of Austria
2022	Michelle Williams	The Fabelmans	Mitzi Fabelman
2023	Lily Gladstone	Killers of the Flower Moon	Mollie Kyle
2023	Penélope Cruz	Ferrari	Laura Ferrari
2023	Sandra Hüller	Anatomy of a Fall	Sandra Voyter
2023	Greta Lee	Past Lives	Nora Moon
2023	Carey Mulligan	Maestro	Felicia Montealegre Bernstein
2023	Natalie Portman	May December	Elizabeth Berry
2024	Fernanda Torres	I'm Still Here	Eunice Paiva
2024	Lily-Rose Depp	Nosferatu	Ellen Hutter
2024	Angelina Jolie	Maria	Maria Callas
2024	Nicole Kidman	Babygirl	Romy Mathis
2024	Saoirse Ronan	The Outrun	Rona
2024	Tilda Swinton	The Room Next Door	Martha Hunt
2025	Jessie Buckley	Hamnet	Agnes Shakespeare
2025	Leonie Benesch	Late Shift	Floria
2025	Chase Infiniti	One Battle After Another	Willa Ferguson
2025	Diane Lane	Anniversary	Ellen Taylor
2025	Renate Reinsve	Sentimental Value	Nora Borg

=== Best Actress – Motion Picture Musical or Comedy (1996–2010, 2018–present) ===
Year	Actress	Film	Role
1996	Gwyneth Paltrow	Emma	Emma Woodhouse
1996	Glenn Close	101 Dalmatians	Cruella de Vil
1996	Shirley MacLaine	Mrs. Winterbourne	Grace Winterbourne
1996	Heather Matarazzo	Welcome to the Dollhouse	Dawn Wiener
1996	Bette Midler	The First Wives Club	Brenda Morelli Cushman
1997	Helen Hunt	As Good as It Gets	Carol Connelly
1997	Pam Grier	Jackie Brown	Jackie Brown
1997	Lisa Kudrow	Romy and Michele's High School Reunion	Michele Weinberger
1997	Parker Posey	The House of Yes	Jacqueline "Jackie-O" Pascal
1997	Julia Roberts	My Best Friend's Wedding	Julianne Potters
1998	Christina Ricci	The Opposite of Sex	Dede Truitt
1998	Jane Horrocks	Little Voice	Little Voice
1998	Holly Hunter	Living Out Loud	Judith Moore
1998	Gwyneth Paltrow	Shakespeare in Love	Viola de Lesseps
1998	Meg Ryan	You've Got Mail	Kathleen Kelly
1999	Janet McTeer	Tumbleweeds	Mary Jo Walker
1999	Julianne Moore	An Ideal Husband	Laura Cheveley
1999	Frances O'Connor	Mansfield Park	Fanny Price
1999	Julia Roberts	Notting Hill	Anna Scott
1999	Cecilia Roth	All About My Mother (Todo sobre mi madre)	Manuela
1999	Reese Witherspoon	Election	Tracy Flick
2000	Renée Zellweger	Nurse Betty	Betty Sizemore
2000	Brenda Blethyn	Saving Grace	Grace Trevethyn
2000	Sandra Bullock	Miss Congeniality	Gracie Hart
2000	Glenn Close	102 Dalmatians	Cruella de Vil
2000	Cameron Diaz	Charlie's Angels	Natalie Cook
2000	Jenna Elfman	Keeping the Faith	Anna Reilly
2001	Nicole Kidman	Moulin Rouge!	Satine
2001	Thora Birch	Ghost World	Enid
2001	Audrey Tautou	Amélie (Le fabuleux destin d'Amélie Poulain)	Amélie Poulain
2001	Sigourney Weaver	Heartbreakers	Max Conners
2001	Reese Witherspoon	Legally Blonde	Elle Woods
2001	Renée Zellweger	Bridget Jones's Diary	Bridget Jones
2002	Jennifer Westfeldt	Kissing Jessica Stein	Jessica Stein
2002	Jennifer Aniston	The Good Girl	Justine Last
2002	Maggie Gyllenhaal	Secretary	Lee Holloway
2002	Catherine Keener	Lovely & Amazing	Michelle Marks
2002	Nia Vardalos	My Big Fat Greek Wedding	Toula Portokalos
2002	Renée Zellweger	Chicago	Roxie Hart
2003	Diane Keaton	Something's Gotta Give	Erica Barry
2003	Jamie Lee Curtis	Freaky Friday	Tess Coleman
2003	Hope Davis	American Splendor	Joyce Brabner
2003	Katie Holmes	Pieces of April	April Burns
2003	Diane Lane	Under the Tuscan Sun	Frances
2003	Helen Mirren	Calendar Girls	Chris Harper
2004	Annette Bening	Being Julia	Julia Lambert
2004	Jena Malone	Saved!	Mary
2004	Natalie Portman	Garden State	Sam
2004	Emmy Rossum	The Phantom of the Opera	Christine Daaé
2004	Kerry Washington	Ray	Della Bea Robinson
2004	Kate Winslet	Eternal Sunshine of the Spotless Mind	Clementine Kruczynski
2005	Reese Witherspoon	Walk the Line	June Carter Cash
2005	Joan Allen	The Upside of Anger	Terry Wolfmeyer
2005	Judi Dench	Mrs Henderson Presents	Laura Henderson
2005	Claire Danes	Shopgirl	Mirabelle
2005	Keira Knightley	Pride & Prejudice	Elizabeth Bennet
2005	Joan Plowright	Mrs. Palfrey at the Claremont	Mrs. Palfrey
2006	Meryl Streep	The Devil Wears Prada	Miranda Priestly
2006	Annette Bening	Running with Scissors	Deirdre Burroughs
2006	Toni Collette	Little Miss Sunshine	Sheryl Hoover
2006	Beyoncé	Dreamgirls	Deena Jones
2006	Julie Walters	Driving Lessons	Evie Walton
2006	Jodie Whittaker	Venus	Jessie
2007	Elliot Page	Juno	Juno MacGuff
2007	Amy Adams	Enchanted	Giselle
2007	Cate Blanchett	I'm Not There	Jude Quinn
2007	Katherine Heigl	Knocked Up	Alison Scott
2007	Nicole Kidman	Margot at the Wedding	Margot
2007	Emily Mortimer	Lars and the Real Girl	Karin Lindstrom
2008	Sally Hawkins	Happy-Go-Lucky	Pauline "Poppy" Cross'
2008	Catherine Deneuve	A Christmas Tale (Un conte de Noël)	Junon
2008	Kat Dennings	Nick and Norah's Infinite Playlist	Norah Silverberg
2008	Lisa Kudrow	Kabluey	Leslie
2008	Debra Messing	Nothing Like the Holidays	Sarah Rodriguez
2008	Meryl Streep	Mamma Mia!	Donna Sheridan
2009	Meryl Streep	Julie & Julia	Julia Child
2009	Sandra Bullock	The Proposal	Margaret Tate
2009	Marion Cotillard	Nine	Luisa Contini
2009	Zooey Deschanel	(500) Days of Summer	Summer Finn
2009	Katherine Heigl	The Ugly Truth	Abby Richter
2010	Anne Hathaway	Love & Other Drugs	Maggie Murdock
2010	Annette Bening	The Kids Are All Right	Nic
2010	Sally Hawkins	Made in Dagenham	Rita O'Grady
2010	Catherine Keener	Please Give	Kate
2010	Julianne Moore	The Kids Are All Right	Jules
2010	Mary-Louise Parker	Red	Sarah Ross
2010	Marisa Tomei	Cyrus	Molly
2018	Olivia Colman	The Favourite	Queen Anne
2018	Emily Blunt	Mary Poppins Returns	Mary Poppins
2018	Trine Dyrholm	Nico, 1988	Nico
2018	Elsie Fisher	Eighth Grade	Kayla Day
2018	Lady Gaga	A Star Is Born	Ally Maine
2018	Constance Wu	Crazy Rich Asians	Rachel Chu
2019	Awkwafina	The Farewell	Billi Wang
2019	Ana de Armas	Knives Out	Marta Cabrera
2019	Julianne Moore	Gloria Bell	Gloria Bell
2019	Constance Wu	Hustlers	Destiny
2020	Maria Bakalova	Borat Subsequent Moviefilm	Tutar Sagdiyev
2020	Rashida Jones	On the Rocks	Laura Keane
2020	Michelle Pfeiffer	French Exit	Frances Price
2020	Margot Robbie	Birds of Prey	Dr. Harleen Quinzel / Harley Quinn
2020	Meryl Streep	The Prom	Dee Dee Allen
2020	Anya Taylor-Joy	Emma.	Emma Woodhouse
2021	Alana Haim	Licorice Pizza	Alana Kane
2021	Melissa Barrera	In the Heights	Vanessa
2021	Jennifer Hudson	Respect	Aretha Franklin
2021	Renate Reinsve	The Worst Person in the World	Julie
2022	Michelle Yeoh	Everything Everywhere All at Once	Evelyn Wang
2022	Janelle Monáe	Glass Onion: A Knives Out Mystery	Cassandra "Andi" Brand / Helen Brand
2022	Margot Robbie	Babylon	Nellie LaRoy
2022	Emma Thompson	Good Luck to You, Leo Grande	Nancy Stokes / Susan Robinson
2023	Emma Stone	Poor Things	Bella Baxter
2023	Fantasia Barrino	The Color Purple	Celie Harris Johnson
2023	Alma Pöysti	Fallen Leaves	Ansa
2023	Margot Robbie	Barbie	Barbie
2023	Cailee Spaeny	Priscilla	Priscilla Presley
2024	Demi Moore	The Substance	Elisabeth Sparkle
2024	Cynthia Erivo	Wicked	Elphaba Thropp
2024	Mikey Madison	Anora	Anora
2024	Winona Ryder	Beetlejuice Beetlejuice	Lydia Deetz
2024	Karla Sofía Gascón	Emilia Pérez	Emilia Pérez
2024	June Squibb	Thelma	Thelma
2025	Rose Byrne	If I Had Legs I'd Kick You	Linda
2025	Cynthia Erivo	Wicked: For Good	Elphaba Thropp
2025	Emma Stone	Bugonia	Michelle Fuller
2025	Eva Victor	Sorry, Baby	Agnes Ward

=== Best Actress – Motion Picture (2011–2017) ===
Year	Actress	Film	Role
2011	Viola Davis	The Help	Aibileen Clark
2011	Glenn Close	Albert Nobbs	Albert Nobbs
2011	Olivia Colman	Tyrannosaur	Hannah
2011	Vera Farmiga	Higher Ground	Corinne
2011	Elizabeth Olsen	Martha Marcy May Marlene	Martha
2011	Meryl Streep	The Iron Lady	Margaret Thatcher
2011	Charlize Theron	Young Adult	Mavis Gary
2011	Emily Watson	Oranges and Sunshine	Margaret Humphreys
2011	Michelle Williams	My Week with Marilyn	Marilyn Monroe
2011	Michelle Yeoh	The Lady	Aung San Suu Kyi
2012	Jennifer Lawrence	Silver Linings Playbook	Tiffany Maxwell
2012	Laura Birn	Purge	Aliide Truu
2012	Jessica Chastain	Zero Dark Thirty	Maya
2012	Emilie Dequenne	Our Children	Murielle
2012	Laura Linney	Hyde Park on Hudson	Margaret Suckley
2012	Keira Knightley	Anna Karenina	Anna Karenina
2012	Emmanuelle Riva	Amour	Anne Laurent
2013	Cate Blanchett	Blue Jasmine	Jeanette "Jasmine" Francis
2013	Amy Adams	American Hustle	Sydney Prosser / Lady Edith Greensly
2013	Sandra Bullock	Gravity	Dr. Ryan Stone
2013	Judi Dench	Philomena	Philomena Lee
2013	Adèle Exarchopoulos	Blue Is the Warmest Colour	Adèle
2013	Julia Louis-Dreyfus	Enough Said	Eva Henderson
2013	Meryl Streep	August: Osage County	Violet Weston
2013	Emma Thompson	Saving Mr. Banks	Pamela "P. L." Travers
2014	Julianne Moore	Still Alice	Dr. Alice Howland
2014	Marion Cotillard	Two Days, One Night	Sandra Bya
2014	Anne Dorval	Mommy	Diane "Die" Després
2014	Felicity Jones	The Theory of Everything	Jane Wilde Hawking
2014	Gugu Mbatha-Raw	Belle	Dido Elizabeth Belle
2014	Rosamund Pike	Gone Girl	Amy Elliott-Dunne
2014	Reese Witherspoon	Wild	Cheryl Strayed
2015	Saoirse Ronan	Brooklyn	Eilis Lacey
2015	Cate Blanchett	Carol	Carol Aird
2015	Blythe Danner	I'll See You in My Dreams	Carol Petersen
2015	Brie Larson	Room	Joy "Ma" Newsome
2015	Carey Mulligan	Suffragette	Maud Watts
2015	Charlotte Rampling	45 Years	Kate Mercer
2016	Isabelle Huppert	Elle	Michèle Leblanc
2016	Ruth Negga	Loving	Mildred Loving
2016	Amy Adams	Nocturnal Animals	Susan Morrow
2016	Annette Bening	20th Century Women	Dorothea Fields
2016	Taraji P. Henson	Hidden Figures	Katherine Johnson
2016	Natalie Portman	Jackie	Jacqueline Kennedy Onassis
2016	Emma Stone	La La Land	Mia Dolan
2016	Meryl Streep	Florence Foster Jenkins	Florence Foster Jenkins
2017	Sally Hawkins	The Shape of Water	Elisa Esposito
2017	Diane Kruger	In the Fade	Katja Sekerci
2017	Jessica Chastain	Molly's Game	Molly Bloom
2017	Judi Dench	Victoria & Abdul	Queen Victoria
2017	Frances McDormand	Three Billboards Outside Ebbing, Missouri	Mildred Hayes
2017	Margot Robbie	I, Tonya	Tonya Harding
2017	Saoirse Ronan	Lady Bird	Christine "Lady Bird" McPherson
2017	Emma Stone	Battle of the Sexes	Billie Jean King

== Multiple winners ==
2 awards

- Cate Blanchett
- Sally Hawkins
- Frances McDormand
- Meryl Streep
- Hilary Swank

== Multiple nominees ==
10 nominations

- Meryl Streep

8 nominations

- Nicole Kidman

6 nominations

- Cate Blanchett
- Judi Dench
- Julianne Moore

5 nominations

- Annette Bening
- Kate Winslet

4 nominations

- Jessica Chastain
- Glenn Close
- Penélope Cruz
- Viola Davis
- Laura Linney
- Helen Mirren
- Carey Mulligan
- Natalie Portman
- Margot Robbie
- Charlize Theron
- Sigourney Weaver
- Reese Witherspoon
- Renée Zellweger

3 nominations

- Amy Adams
- Joan Allen
- Sandra Bullock
- Toni Collette
- Olivia Colman
- Marion Cotillard
- Sally Hawkins
- Keira Knightley
- Frances McDormand
- Julia Roberts
- Emma Stone
- Tilda Swinton
- Emily Watson
- Michelle Williams

2 nominations

- Brenda Blethyn
- Emily Blunt
- Helena Bonham Carter
- Julie Christie
- Jennifer Connelly
- Lady Gaga
- Maggie Gyllenhaal
- Anne Hathaway
- Katherine Heigl
- Angelina Jolie
- Catherine Keener
- Lisa Kudrow
- Diane Lane
- Jennifer Lawrence
- Gwyneth Paltrow
- Rosamund Pike
- Saoirse Ronan
- Kristin Scott Thomas
- Emma Thompson
- Naomi Watts
- Robin Wright
- Constance Wu

== See also ==
- Academy Award for Best Actress
- Golden Globe Award for Best Actress – Motion Picture Musical or Comedy
- Golden Globe Award for Best Actress – Motion Picture Drama
- Critics' Choice Movie Award for Best Actress
