= Capturing the Killer Nurse =

2022 documentary by Tim Travers Hawkins

- Promotional release poster
- Based on: The Good Nurse: A True Story of Medicine, Madness, and Murder by Charles Graeber
- Written by: Tim Travers Hawkins; Robin Ockleford
- Directed by: Tim Travers Hawkins
- Starring: Charles Cullen; Amy Loughren
- Music by: Benji Merrison; Will Slater; Tusks
- Country of origin: United Kingdom
- Original language: English

Production
- Producer: Robin Ockleford
- Cinematography: Will Pugh
- Editor: Michael Rolt
- Running time: 94 minutes
- Production companies: Sandpaper Films; Fifty Fifty Post

Original release
- Network: Netflix
- Release: November 11, 2022

Capturing the Killer Nurse is a 2022 true crime documentary film about serial killer Charles Cullen and how investigators were able to prove Cullen was killing patients while working in hospitals and at a nursing home as a nurse in the United States. The film is based on the 2013 book The Good Nurse: A True Story of Medicine, Madness, and Murder by Charles Graeber and is directed by Tim Travers Hawkins, who wrote the screenplay with Robin Ockleford. Produced by Sandpaper Films and Fifty Fifty Post, it was released on November 11, 2022, on the streaming service Netflix.

== Backstory ==
Charles Cullen confessed to killing up to 40 people in nine hospitals and one nursing home during the 16 years he worked as a nurse in New Jersey and Pennsylvania. Some suspect the number to be significantly higher. Nearly all the hospitals where he worked harbored suspicions that he was endangering patients, but none of them informed Cullen's future employers of their concerns.

He was eventually captured by Somerset County police detectives. Somerset Medical Center, where at least 13 patients died, at first ignored the urging of Dr. Steven Marcus, director of the NJ Poison Control Center, to contact the police, then delayed. Once they contacted police, they lied and failed to help them with its investigation.

Newspaper headlines dubbed Cullen "The Angel of Death." He was the subject of the 2013 true crime book The Good Nurse: A True Story of Medicine, Madness, and Murder written by journalist and author Charles Graeber, and was featured in the 2022 film The Good Nurse by director Tobias Lindholm, starring Jessica Chastain and Eddie Redmayne.

In 2005, the state Health Care Professional Responsibility and Reporting Enhancement Act (HCPRREA), also referred to as the "Cullen" Law, was signed into law in New Jersey.

In March 2006, Cullen received 11 life sentences for killing 29 patients. A week later at his second sentencing hearing, he was given another 6 more life terms. He is incarcerated at the New Jersey State Prison in Trenton, New Jersey. He is not eligible for parole until June 2388.

== Synopsis ==
Capturing the Killer Nurse is a 2022 documentary film about the convicted serial killer Charles Cullen. It includes interviews with Cullen, his co-workers, detectives, and Amy Loughren, a friend and fellow nurse who assisted the detectives. There are interviews with family members of the victims, journalist and author Charles Graeber and audio from Cullen himself. The film also takes a look at the U.S. healthcare system, saying that profit motives of private healthcare helped Cullen continue to commit his crimes without consequences. It began streaming on Netflix on November 11, 2022.

== Reception ==
Capturing the Killer Nurse was received with mixed reviews. Nick Pope at Esquire writes, "The audience needs to be prepared for a shocking tale", and calls it "truly horrifying." Film critic for Variety Owen Gleiberman suggests that both the documentary Capturing the Killer Nurse and the film The Good Nurse are "engineered to feel like a drama" and "show you that the Cullen saga may be the first case of a serial killer who was enabled by corporate malfeasance." Kate Erbland, film critic for IndieWire, calls it "a flimsy documentary about murderous nurse Charles Cullen" and concludes "If nothing else, “Capturing the Killer Nurse” should inspire its viewers, eager for both more information and more nuance, to seek out Lindholm's film." On the review aggregator website Rotten Tomatoes, 71% of 7 critics' reviews are positive, with an average rating of 5.5/10.

== See also ==
- The Good Nurse – 2022 crime drama film by Tobias Lindholm
- The Good Nurse: A True Story of Medicine, Madness, and Murder – Book by Charles Graeber
