= The Good Nurse: A True Story of Medicine, Madness, and Murder =

Book by Charles Graeber

The Good Nurse
- 2013 hardcover edition
- Author: Charles Graeber
- Audio read by: Will Collyer
- Language: English
- Genres: Non-fiction; True crime
- Set in: New Jersey, U.S.; Pennsylvania, U.S.
- Publisher: Twelve
- Publication date: April 15, 2013
- Publication place: United States
- Media type: Print: Hardcover, Paperback; Digital: Audiobook
- Pages: 320 (first edition)
- ISBN: 9780446505291
- Website: twelvebooks.com

The Good Nurse: A True Story of Medicine, Madness, and Murder is a 2013 true-crime book about Charles Cullen, a nurse and convicted serial killer, written by American journalist and author Charles Graeber. Graeber documents how Cullen was able to move several times within the health care system in the Northeast of the United States and how police detectives, with the help of a confidential informant, Amy Loughren, were able to bring him to justice. The book also reveals the institutional and moral shortcomings of hospitals and administrators, who enabled Cullen to move from place to place in order to protect bottom lines instead of caring for the well-being of patients. The book is a follow-up to Graeber's 2007 New York magazine article about Cullen.

== Synopsis ==
The Good Nurse chronicles the murders of American serial killer Charles Cullen during his sixteen-year nursing career working in the New Jersey and Pennsylvania medical systems before being arrested in 2003. Nearly ten years in the making, the book outlines murder, friendship, and betrayal based on police records, interviews, wiretaps, and videotapes, as well as exclusive jailhouse conversations between Cullen himself and Amy Loughren, a fellow nurse, who helped bring him down while risking her job and the safety of her children.

== Reception ==
The book was generally well received. American journalist Janet Maslin from the New York Times calls it "a stunning book with a flat, uninflected title that should and does bring to mind "In Cold Blood." She does go on to say that "Mr. Graeber was well aware that to immortalize this nurse's chilling deeds was to exploit them; promoting the book may have the same effect." The American book reviewer magazine Kirkus calls the book "a thrilling and suspenseful page-turner that is sure to be loved by the majority of readers, who will be both horrified and fascinated." Liz Raftery, correspondent for The Boston Globe sees it as "a standout true-crime book...both a thrilling horror story and a cautionary tale." Josh McMahon, reviewer for the New Jersey Star Ledger, finds it "Engrossing... hard-to-put-down.... On one level, The Good Nurse is an absorbing story of a serial killer operating within the walls of what most view as a trusted institution. On another, it's an intriguing detective story. And on another it's an indictment of the hospital industry."

== Adaptation ==
The 2022 American crime drama film The Good Nurse is an adaptation of Graeber's book. It was directed by Danish filmmaker Tobias Lindholm and written by Krysty Wilson-Cairns. It had its global premiere on September 11, 2022 at the Toronto International Film Festival. It was released in select theaters on October 19, 2022, before streaming on Netflix on October 26, 2022.

Principal actors and characters in the film were Eddie Redmayne as Charles Cullen, Jessica Chastain as Amy Loughren, Kim Dickens as Linda Garran, Nnamdi Asomugha as Danny Baldwin, and Noah Emmerich as Tim Braun.

== See also ==
- Capturing the Killer Nurse – 2022 documentary by Tim Travers Hawkins
