= Late Shift (film) =

2025 Swiss drama film

- Theatrical release poster
- German: Heldin
- Literally: Hero
- Directed by: Petra Volpe
- Written by: Petra Volpe
- Produced by: Lukas Hobi; Reto Schaerli
- Starring: Leonie Benesch; Sonja Riesen; Selma Aldin; Alireza Bayram
- Cinematography: Judith Kaufmann
- Edited by: Hansjörg Weißbrich
- Music by: Emilie Levienaise-Farrouch
- Production companies: Zodiac Pictures Ltd; MMC Zodiac GmbH; SRF Swiss Radio and Television; SRG SSR
- Distributed by: Filmcoopi (Switzerland); Tobis Film (Germany)
- Release dates: February 17, 2025 (Berlinale); February 27, 2025 (Switzerland)
- Running time: 91 minutes
- Countries: Switzerland; Germany
- Languages: German; Swiss German
- Budget: €3.7 million
- Box office: $4 million

Late Shift (German: Heldin, lit. 'Hero') is a 2025 drama film written and directed by Petra Volpe, inspired by the book Unser Beruf ist nicht das Problem: Es sind die Umstände by Madeline Calvelage. Starring Leonie Benesch, the film focuses on a young nurse, Floria, who works with unwavering dedication in an understaffed hospital ward, but on this day, her shift turns into a nerve-racking race against time.

The film had its world premiere in Berlinale Special Gala section of the 75th Berlin International Film Festival on 17 February 2025. It was theatrically released in Switzerland on 27 February by Filmcoopi. It was selected as the Swiss entry for the Best International Feature Film at the 98th Academy Awards, making the December shortlist.

== Synopsis ==
Floria Lind is a dedicated nurse working at an understaffed hospital. The film depicts one of her shifts from beginning to end. During her shift, there is only one other nurse working with her, Bea Schmid, and one intern named Amelie Afshar.

The patients that Floria tends to during the shift and the encounters she has with them are as follows:

- Mrs. Kuhn is an elderly woman suffering from memory loss. Floria, together with her colleague Jan Sharif, changes Kuhn's diaper. Kuhn does not know where she is and is panicking. At one point, Kuhn's daughter, who lives in Boston, calls Floria and asks to speak to her mother, but Kuhn cannot recognize her daughter's voice on the phone. When Kuhn says that she wants to go home and be with her husband, Floria has to calm her by singing with her a song that the woman knows by heart.
- Mr. Leu is an elderly man who is alone in the hospital. He is worried that his dog will be left alone if something happens to him. He tells Floria that his dog is currently staying with his neighbor, but that the neighbor refuses to take it in, and he shows Floria photos of the dog on his cell phone. Leu tells Floria multiple times that he wants to get information about his condition from Dr. Strobel, and Floria tries to reach the doctor several times but is unsuccessful. Eventually, she sees Dr. Strobel on the stairs as she is leaving the hospital and conveys Leu's request, but the doctor says that she can provide the information tomorrow. Floria protests, but Strobel leaves anyway. Unable to obtain information about his condition, Leu leaves the hospital after leaving a thank-you note for Floria on his bed. Floria goes outside the hospital and looks for him but cannot find him.
- Mr. Osmani prepares for an operation he is about to undergo. His wife, Mrs. Osmani, is with him as his companion. Floria takes Mr. Osmani to the operating room. The operation is successful.
- Mr. Nwachukwu (Nana) is originally from Burkina Faso. Since his German is not very good, he and Floria have difficulty communicating. He mentions that he is alone there. He needs to undergo a CT scan to determine whether he needs surgery, but before that, he has to take a medication. Although the medication makes him nauseous, he manages to undergo the CT scan without vomiting.
- Mrs. Lauber repeatedly asks for her antibiotic to be renewed, but Floria has to delay this because of her heavy workload. When she is finally able to attend to Lauber, she notices that the woman's hand has become infected. While Floria is looking for a new vein in her other arm, Lauber mentions that it has always been very difficult to find a vein in her arm. However, Floria manages to insert the IV line easily, and Lauber tells Floria that she is the first person to do it on the first attempt.
- Mr. Schneider is an elderly man who appears to be dying. His daughter, Pascale, is with him as his companion. Floria tells Pascale that she needs to rest and asks whether she has anyone to support her. Pascale says that she has a brother, but that in the end, the responsibility falls on the daughters. She says that she cannot leave her father's side because she wants to be there when he dies, as he could die at any moment. She asks for painkillers for her father. It takes Floria some time to bring the painkillers, and she apologizes for the delay.
- Mr. Severin is a patient with private insurance who is therefore staying in a private room. Although he does not appear to have a condition requiring urgent attention, his demanding and snobbish behavior puts Floria under pressure. When he asks her for tea, Floria has to bring it very late because she has more urgent cases to attend to. Severin shows Floria his wristwatch, saying that he has been timing her and that she is very late, and insults her. Angered, Floria takes the man's watch and throws it out of the window. Severin says that it is a very expensive watch and tells her to go and retrieve it. When Floria tells Bea about the incident, Bea laughs. Floria goes downstairs and looks for Severin's watch but cannot find it. She returns and explains the situation to him, telling him that he can file a complaint against her if he wishes. Severin says that the watch does not matter. He then has an emotional breakdown and tells Floria that, despite living a healthy lifestyle and having a family in which everyone lives to an old age, he has cancer, which he has not told anyone about, including his wife, and wonders why this has happened to him. A female patient who was smoking outside the hospital when the watch was thrown finds it and later gives it to Floria. Floria returns to Severin's room and places the watch on the bedside table next to the sleeping man.
- Mrs. Bilgin is an elderly woman who is dying. Her three sons, who are at the hospital, want information about their mother's condition, but Floria is unable to communicate the information to them. At one point, Mrs. Bilgin's heart stops. The son who is alone at the hospital at that moment informs Floria, but despite all efforts to resuscitate her, the woman cannot be saved. The doctor informs the son of the situation outside, and the son tells his two brothers. They return to the hospital, and the three brothers cry together. One of them confronts Floria, saying that they did not take sufficient care of their mother. Floria later tells Bea that Mrs. Bilgin was supposed to be the last patient on her rounds, but that she did not make it in time and was unable to attend to her. The woman's body is taken to the morgue.
- Mrs. Morina is a woman with cancer. Her husband, son, and daughter come to the hospital to visit her. At one point, Floria asks the other members of the family to leave so that she can do her work. Mrs. Morina thanks her for this, and Floria advises her to tell her family whenever she needs time to rest. Morina underwent treatment the previous year, but her cancer has returned, and she wonders whether she will have to keep going through this cycle. She then remembers that Floria was on the verge of separating from her husband the previous year, and asks about her current situation. Floria says that a complete separation is not really an option when there is a child involved. At one point, Floria speaks to her daughter on the phone; her daughter is at her father's house at the time, and the conversation is brief.

At the end of the movie, Floria finishes her shift and catches a train home. When a woman sits next to her, Floria puts her head on her shoulder. The various patients seen throughout the movie are shown again shortly. The song Hope There's Someone by Anohni and the Johnsons plays at the end of the movie. The title cards in the end give the following information: "By 2030, Switzerland will face a shortage of 30,000 nurses. 36% of trained nurses leave the profession within just four years. The global shortage of nurses is a worldwide health crisis. The WHO estimates that there will be a shortage of 13 million nurses by 2030."

== Cast ==
- Leonie Benesch as Floria
- Sonja Riesen as Bea Schmid
- Selma Aldin as Amelie Afshar
- Alireza Bayram as Jan Sharif
- Ali Kandaş as Nabil Bilgin
- Aline Beetschen as Evelyn Bühler
- Jasmin Mattei as Claudia Bach
- Urs Bihler as Mr. Leu
- Nicole Bachmann as Dr. Strobel
- Doris Schefer as Pascale Schneider
- Margherita Schoch as Mrs. Kuhn
- Lale Yavaş as Patient
- Pema Shitsetsang as Doctor

== Production ==
Volpe was inspired to write the film by the nonfiction book Unser Beruf ist nicht das Problem. Es sind die Umstände (Our Profession Is Not the Problem. It's the Circumstances) by the German nurse Madeline Calvelage.

Principal photography began on 22 January 2024 at locations in Canton of Zurich and Basel-Landschaft. Filming ended on 9 March 2024 in Kilchberg, Zurich.

The film was shot at Cantonal Hospital Baselland in Basel-Landschaft.

== Release ==
Late Shift had its world premiere on 17 February 2025, as part of the 75th Berlin International Film Festival, in Berlinale Special Gala.

It was released theatrically in Swiss theaters on 27 February 2025 by Filmcoopi Zurich.

The film featured at the 72nd Sydney Film Festival in the Features section on 7 June 2025. It was also featured at The 25th European Film Festival held in conjunction with 8th Malaysia International Film Festival and screened on 21 July 2025. It was screened at the 78th Locarno Film Festival on 11 August 2025 in Swiss Panorama section. It was also showcased at the 53rd Norwegian International Film Festival in Main Programme section on 17 August 2025. On 2 October 2025, it was presented in Panorama section of 2025 Vancouver International Film Festival.

On 7 November 2025, it was presented in Official Section of 22nd Seville European Film Festival. It was presented in 'Cinema of the World - 2025' section of the 56th International Film Festival of India in November 2025.

It will be screened in the Red Sea: Festival Favourites at the Red Sea International Film Festival on 6 December 2025.

The film will compete in the Awards Buzz – Best International Feature Film section of the 37th Palm Springs International Film Festival on 5 January 2026.

On 6 August, the film was shortlisted along with two other films as Switzerland's Oscar submission for the 98th Academy Awards, and on 12 August, it was selected as Switzerland's official entry to the Oscars. Music Box Films acquired the North American distribution rights of the film on the same day.

== Reception ==
=== Critical response ===
On the review aggregator website Rotten Tomatoes, 97% of 59 critics' reviews are positive, with an average rating of 7.9/10. The website's consensus reads: "Equal parts harrowing and unsentimental in its evocation of the brutal grind of hospital work, Late Shift clocks in as an accomplished character study with a superb Leonie Benesch front and center." Metacritic, which uses a weighted average, assigned the film a score of 69 out of 100, based on 12 critics, indicating "generally favorable" reviews.

Peter Bradshaw of The Guardian rated the film three out of five stars, writing that the film was shot in the Aaron Sorkin walk and talk lines style, with the protagonist "exchanging terse technical dialogue with colleagues in the corridors". He concluded the review praising Benesch, opining that she "brings a tough, smart, credible presence".

=== Accolades ===
The film was shortlisted for a nomination at the 38th European Film Awards for the Feature Film category, though it failed to receive a nomination. However, Benesch was nominated for European Actress; the ceremony took place on 17 January 2026.

| Award | Date of ceremony | Category | Recipient | Result | Ref. |
|---|---|---|---|---|---|
| Camerimage | 22 November 2025 | Golden Frog | Judith Kaufmann | Won | |
| Dublin Film Critics' Circle | 18 December 2025 | Best Actress | Leonie Benesch | 5th place | |
| European Film Awards | 17 January 2026 | European Actress | Leonie Benesch | Nominated | |
| Satellite Awards | 8 March 2026 | Best Motion Picture – International | Late Shift | Pending | |
| Satellite Awards | 8 March 2026 | Best Actress in a Motion Picture – Drama | Leonie Benesch | Pending | |
| Seville European Film Festival | 15 November 2025 | Best Editing Award | Hansjörg Weißbrich | Won | |
| Zurich Film Festival | 12 January 2026 | Golden Eye Award | Petra Volpe | Honored | |

== See also ==
- List of Swiss submissions for the Academy Award for Best International Feature Film
- List of submissions to the 98th Academy Awards for Best International Feature Film
