= The Breakthrough: Immunotherapy and the Race to Cure Cancer =

Book by Charles Graeber

The Breakthrough
- 2018 hardcover edition
- Author: Charles Graeber
- Audio read by: Will Collyer
- Language: English
- Genres: Non-fiction
- Publisher: Twelve
- Publication date: November 13, 2018
- Publication place: United States
- Media type: Print: Hardcover, Paperback; Digital: Audio book, eBook
- Pages: 320 (first edition)
- ISBN: 9781455568505
- Website: twelvebooks.com

The Breakthrough: Immunotherapy and the Race to Cure Cancer is a non-fiction book written by American journalist and author Charles Graeber. The book was written for the lay reader and includes sections on immunology written for a general audience. It was published by Twelve just before James P. Allison and Tasuku Honjo won the 2018 Nobel Prize in Physiology or Medicine for their work on cancer immunology.

== Backstory ==
When Graeber was considering writing a book about curing cancer using immunotherapy, he had approached his agent Susan Golomb who in turn sought the advice of her father, a retired oncologist. After being told not to bother, "it doesn't work", she had decided to support Graeber with his book anyway. It was a challenging book to write, according to Graeber, because he had trouble coming up with gripping true tales that also represented the big picture. It took four years to research and to complete the book.

== Synopsis ==
The Breakthrough is written for the lay reader and includes sections on immunology that have been written for a general audience. It examines the development of cancer immunotherapy, starting with William Coley's work with toxins in the 1890s, moving on to the long hiatus of immunotherapy, and concluding with victory for the believers in the form of regulatory approval of CTLA-4, PD-1, and PD-L1 immune checkpoint inhibitors and chimeric antigen receptor T-cell therapies. The book was published shortly before James P. Allison and Tasuku Honjo from Kyoto University were awarded the Nobel Prize in Physiology or Medicine in October 2018 for their work on cancer immunology.

== Reception ==
The Breakthrough was generally well received, including positive peer reviews. In a five-book review for the journal Nature, Barbara Kiser called Graeber's book a "deft, detailed study of cancer immunotherapy" and included, "From the once-discredited pioneer William Coley to immunologist and Nobel laureate James P. Allison, they form a brilliant, driven, admirably stubborn group that Graeber brings vividly to life." For The New York Times, journalist and author Mimi Swartz stated that Graeber's book "artfully traces the history of old and new developments that may have — finally — resulted in an actual cure for the most dreaded of all diseases." In The Wall Street Journal, David A. Shaywitz found it "Engaging" and added "In Mr. Graeber's hands, the evolution of immuno-oncology is both captivating and heartbreaking." He went on to say, "We can't fail to see ourselves, our friends and our families in these stories." For the Winnipeg Free Press, Douglas J. Johnston reviewed it as “Brilliantly rendered." and added, "pulls you into the narrative right off the hop and never lets go.”

== Awards ==
The Breakthrough was shortlisted as the 2019 Medical Book of the Year by the British Medical Association.
