= Krysty Wilson-Cairns =

Scottish screenwriter (born 1987)

- Born: 26 May 1987 (age 39); Glasgow, Scotland
- Education: Craigholme School; Royal Conservatoire of Scotland; National Film and Television School
- Occupation: Screenwriter
- Writing career
- Years active: 2012–present

Krysty Norma Lesley Wilson-Cairns (born 26 May 1987) is a Scottish screenwriter. Born and raised in Glasgow, she studied at the Royal Conservatoire of Scotland and the National Film and Television School. During her teenage years, she was a runner on television series including the detective show Taggart. Her script for the unproduced science fiction thriller Aether made the 2014 Black List and led to a staff writer role on the television show Penny Dreadful. Her feature film debut was the screenplay for the Sam Mendes-directed 2019 war film 1917. She co-wrote it with Mendes and received nominations for the Academy Award for Best Original Screenplay and the Writers Guild of America Award for Best Original Screenplay.

== Early life and education ==
Wilson-Cairns was born on 26 May 1987 in Glasgow, Scotland. She grew up in the Shawlands area of the city in a single-parent household. Wilson-Cairns attended the private Craigholme School. Her grandparents partly funded her place at the school. At the age of 15, she had a work experience placement on the Scottish detective show Taggart. The series had used the mechanic shop that her father worked in as a set and she reports watching the filming of it during her summer holidays. She became a runner on the show as well as on other television series including Rebus and Lip Service.

Wilson-Cairns had initially aspired to study physics and become an engineer but her on set experiences as a runner fostered her interest in working in the film industry. She studied Digital Film and Television at the Royal Conservatoire of Scotland (RCS), and graduated in 2009. Her first creative work at the RCS was a short story about killer guinea pigs. She credits her ambition to become a screenwriter on being inspired by one of her lecturers at the RCS, screenwriter Richard Smith. She then spent a year working at the BBC Comedy Unit, before moving to London where she gained an MA in Screenwriting from the National Film and Television School (NFTS) in 2013. While studying at the NFTS, she worked as a bartender in The Toucan, an Irish pub in Soho, and developed script ideas during her downtime.

== Career ==
Wilson-Cairns sold her first film script to FilmNation Entertainment in 2014. It was for the science fiction thriller project Aether, which provided her breakthrough after it made the top ten of the Black List. The script was read by screenwriter John Logan who hired her as a staff writer on his television show Penny Dreadful in 2015. She also contributed to its comic book series. After this, her first writing commission was for a potential film adaptation, to be directed by Tobias Lindholm, of Charles Graeber's non-fiction book The Good Nurse: A True Story of Medicine, Madness, and Murder. Filmmaker Sam Mendes was impressed by her treatment, and suggested collaborating on a future film project. They had previously met while working on Penny Dreadful, for which he was an executive producer, and worked on two potential projects together. This included a film adaptation of Gay Talese's book The Voyeur's Motel and an Invisibilia podcast. However, both projects fell through due to licensing issues. In 2017, she was named as one of Forbes′ 30 under 30 in the Hollywood and Entertainment category.

Her feature film debut was the screenplay for Mendes' World War I film 1917 (2019) which she co-wrote. The film follows two young British soldiers on a mission to warn a fellow battalion of a German ambush, and is shot to appear as if it is one continuous take. To help develop the script, she travelled to the battlefields and cemeteries of World War I in northern France with her mother and read frontline diaries at the Imperial War Museum. For her work on the film, Wilson-Cairns received nominations for the Academy Award for Best Original Screenplay, the Writers Guild of America Award for Best Original Screenplay, and shared the BAFTA Award for Outstanding British Film. She was named as one of the 10 Screenwriters to Watch by the trade magazine Variety in their 2019 list. In October 2020, she co-founded Great Company with producer Jack Ivins. The following year, the company signed a two-year film deal with Universal Pictures. She co-wrote the screenplay of Edgar Wright's psychological horror Last Night in Soho (2021), and had a cameo as a bartender. The following year, she wrote the screenplay for The Good Nurse, an adaptation of the Charles Graeber novel, which was first announced in 2014 as her first writing commission. The film was about the serial killer nurse Charles Cullen and intensive care nurse Amy Loughren who helped to convict him. Wilson-Cairns spent a fortnight working in a burns unit in a hospital in Connecticut to learn about the American healthcare system to develop the script. For her work on the film, she received a nomination for Best Writer Film/Television at the 2023 British Academy Scotland Awards.

Her upcoming projects include an adaptation of journalist Evan Ratliff's book The Mastermind: Drugs. Empire. Murder. Betrayal. about programmer-turned-drug cartel boss Paul Le Roux, for an Amazon Studios crime drama series. She is also writing the screenplay for a biopic on the Egyptian Queen Cleopatra directed by Denis Villeneuve, based on Stacy Schiff's biography Cleopatra: A Life.

== Filmography ==
=== Film ===
Year	Title	Notes	Ref(s)
2019	1917	Co-written with Sam Mendes	
2021	Last Night in Soho	Co-written with Edgar Wright	
2022	The Good Nurse		

=== Television ===
Year	Title	Role	Notes	Ref(s)
2016	Penny Dreadful	Writer	2 episodes: "No Beast So Fierce", "Perpetual Night"; Also staff writer in season 3	

== Awards and nominations ==
Award	Date	Category	Work	Result	Ref(s)
Writers Guild of America Awards	1 February 2020	Best Original Screenplay	1917	Nominated	
British Academy Film Awards	2 February 2020	Outstanding British Film	1917	Won	
Academy Awards	9 February 2020	Best Original Screenplay	1917	Nominated	
British Academy Scotland Awards	19 November 2023	Best Writer Film/Television	The Good Nurse	Nominated	
