= Holiday Secrets =

2019 German-language television series

- Release poster
- Genre: Drama
- Starring: Corinna Harfouch; Christiane Paul; Svenja Jung
- Country of origin: Germany
- Original language: German
- No. of seasons: 1
- No. of episodes: 3

Production
- Running time: 34–42 minutes
- Production companies: Netflix Studios; Sommerhaus Filmproduktion; Proton Cinema

Original release
- Network: Netflix
- Release: 20 November 2019

Holiday Secrets is a 2019 German television series starring Corinna Harfouch, Christiane Paul, and Svenja Jung. The plot revolves around a gathering for the holidays by three generations of a family, where secrets are slowly making it come apart.

It was released on November 20, 2019, on Netflix.

== Cast ==
- Corinna Harfouch - Eva
- Christiane Paul - Sonja
- Svenja Jung - Vivi
- Leonie Benesch - Lara
- Hans-Uwe Bauer - Olaf
- Dennis Herrmann - Moritz
- Golo Euler - Anton
- Barbara Nüsse - Alma
- Lorna zu Solms - Vivi (young)
- Anita Vulesica - Ljubica
- Tilda Jenkins - Lara (young)
- Maik Solbach - Hans
- Thilo Prothmann - Walter
- Merlin Rose - Peter
- Lisa Hagmeister - Alma (young)
- Eva Bay - Juliana
- Laura von Beloseroff - Ljubica (young)
- Emilie Neumeister - Sonja (young)
- Matti Schmidt-Schaller - Walter (young)
- Ludwig Senger - Anton (young)
- Lucas Lentes - Walter (young)
- Esther Esche - Bettina

== Episodes ==
No.	Title	Directed by	Original release date
1	"Welcome Home"	Samira Radsi	November 20, 2019
In the throes of emotional crisis, three generations of women reunite and reclaim what’s left of their mother-daughter memories -- for better or worse.
2	"Sonja's Secret"	Samira Radsi	November 20, 2019
The family prepares for a festive feast, Vivi faces a former flame, Lara looks to the future and Sonja's past comes to light.
3	"Eva's Secret"	Samira Radsi	November 20, 2019
A surprise guest reframes the spirit of Christmas as Eva’s health takes an uncertain turn, and a gripping secret leads to an explosive seaside search.

== Release ==
Holiday Secrets was released on November 20, 2019, on Netflix.

== See also ==
- List of Christmas films
