= Charles Graeber =

American journalist and author

Charles Graeber is an American journalist and author who published two nonfiction books in the 2010s. He wrote the 2013 book The Good Nurse: A True Story of Medicine, Madness, and Murder about the serial killer Charles Cullen, which was a follow-up to his 2007 article for New York magazine about Cullen, and the 2018 book The Breakthrough: Immunotherapy and the Race to Cure Cancer about cancer immunotherapy.

Graeber was born in the US state of Iowa and lives in Nantucket, Massachusetts, and Brooklyn, New York. Before becoming a journalist and author, he was a medical student and researcher and co-authored papers for scientific journals. As a journalist, Graeber has written for numerous publications, including Wired, GQ, The New Yorker, Outside, and The New York Times. The New York Times's Janet Maslin said Graeber "has been drawn to extremes throughout his reporting career", highlighting his Wired article about Kim Dotcom.

Graeber's book The Good Nurse was adapted into the 2022 drama film The Good Nurse, produced by Netflix. Graeber met with the film's writer Krysty Wilson-Cairns and provided access to the materials he used for his book. He is also one of the executive producers for the 2022 Netflix documentary film Capturing the Killer Nurse.

== Bibliography ==
Noteworthy articles

- Graeber, Charles (April 5, 2007). "The Tainted Kidney". New York.
- Graeber, Charles (October 18, 2012). "Inside the Mansion—and Mind—of the Net's Most Wanted Man". Wired.

Books

- Graeber, Charles (2013). The Good Nurse: A True Story of Medicine, Madness, and Murder. Twelve. ISBN 978-0-446-50529-1.
- Graeber, Charles (2018). The Breakthrough: Immunotherapy and the Race to Cure Cancer. Twelve. ISBN 978-1-4555-6850-5.
