= 22nd Seville European Film Festival =

2025 film festival

- Official poster by José Luis Ágreda
- Opening film: The Last Viking
- Closing film: Chopin, a Sonata in Paris
- Location: Seville, Spain
- Awards: Golden Giraldillo: We Believe You
- Festival date: 7–15 November 2025

Seville European Film Festival
- 2026 2024

The 22nd Seville European Film Festival took place from 7 to 15 November 2025 in Seville, Spain. Anders Thomas Jensen's black comedy film The Last Viking served as the festival's opening film while Michał Kwieciński's biographical drama Chopin, a Sonata in Paris closed the festival.

Belgian drama We Believe You, directed by Charlotte Devillers and Arnaud Dufeys, won the Golden Giraldillo, as well as the awards for Best Screenplay and Best Actress.

== Background ==
On 31 October 2025, the complete lineup was announced, including over 180 Spanish and international films. A competitive section for short films was introduced including two awards: Best Short Film and Best Animated Short Film. It was also announced that the nominations for the 38th European Film Awards, presented by the European Film Awards, will be announced at Real Alcázar in Seville on 18 November 2025. The nominations announcement, which had been held in Seville for previous editions of the awards, will take place in the city every two years. The official posters for the festival were designed by José Luis Ágreda, inspired by the traditional posters for the celebrations that take place in Seville during spring.

Greek-French filmmaker Costa-Gavras, French actress Juliette Binoche, Spanish filmmaker Alberto Rodríguez Librero, and Irish director Jim Sheridan, all will be honored with the Giraldillo of Honor. Additionally, Rodríguez Librero will present his film Los Tigres as one of the special screenings while Binoche will screen in the same section the documentary In-I in Motion, her directorial debut.

== Sections ==
The films and projects selected for each announced section are as follows:

=== Official selection ===
Highlighted title indicates award winner.

English title	Original title	Director(s)	Production countrie(s)
A Magnificent Life	Marcel et Monsieur Pagnol	Sylvain Chomet	France, Luxembourg, Belgium
A Year of School	Un anno di scuola	Laura Samani	Italy, France
All That's Left of You	اللي باقي منك	Cherien Dabis	Germany, Cyprus, Palestine, Jordan, Greece, Qatar, Saudi Arabia
Under the Same Sun	Bajo el mismo sol	Ulises Porra	Dominican Republic, Spain
DJ Ahmet	Диџеј Ахмет	Georgi M. Unkovski	North Macedonia, Czech Republic, Serbia, Croatia
Case 137	Dossier 137	Dominik Moll	France
Dreams (Sex Love)	Drømmer	Dag Johan Haugerud	Norway
The Piano Accident	L'Accident de piano	Quentin Dupieux	France
The Last Viking (opening film)	Den sidste viking	Anders Thomas Jensen	Denmark, Sweden
Enzo		Robin Campillo	France, Belgium, Italy
Fuori		Mario Martone	Italy, France
The Anatomy of the Horses	La anatomía de los caballos	Daniel Vidal Toche	Spain, Peru, Colombia, France
The Little Sister	La Petite Dernière	Hafsia Herzi	France, Germany
Late Shift	Heldin	Petra Volpe	Switzerland, Germany
Colours of Time	La Venue de l'avenir	Cédric Klapisch	France
Mother	Мајка	Teona Strugar Mitevska	Belgium, North Macedonia
We Believe You	On vous croit	Charlotte Devillers, Arnaud Dufeys	Belgium
Out of competition
Chopin, a Sonata in Paris	Chopin, Chopin!	Michał Kwieciński	Poland
Islands	Islas	Marina Seresesky	Spain
Serás Farruquito		Santi Aguado, Reuben Atlas	Spain, United States

=== Short Films ===
Highlighted title indicates award winner.

English title	Original title	Director(s)	Production countrie(s)
A Good Day	Um dia bom	Tiago Rosa-Rosso	Portugal
A South-Facing Window	Une fenêtre plein sud	Lkhagvadulam Purev-Ochir	Francia, Mongolia
Autokar		Sylwia Szkiłądź	Belgium, France
Baile de Feria		Bernabé Bulnes	Spain
Between the Lines		Niklas Pollmann	Austria
Blackbird	Paysage après la bataille	João Paulo Miranda Maria	France
Bright Summer Days	Beli dani	Nevena Desivojević	Serbia, Bosnia and Herzegovina, North Macedonia, Portugal
Dad's Not Home	Taty nie ma	Jan Saczek	Poland
Dissection of an Incoherence in Crisi	Dissecció d'una incoherència en crisi	Nausica Serra	Spain
Éiru		Giovanna Ferrari	Ireland
Hermanas		Setefilla González Naranjo, Javier Barbero Montes	Spain
In Her Arms		Roman Volosevych	Ukraine
L'Horizon du bout du nez		Étienne Bonnet	France
The Song of the Sheep	Le Cantique des Moutons	Jules Marcel, Anaïs Castro de Angel, Juliette Bigo, Evan Lambert, Alex Le Ruyet, Jeanne Bigo, Anaïs Ledoux	France
Le Jardin Rossini		William Burger, Siméon Jacob, Odelia Laine, Garance Mondamert, Tara Rewal, Mathilde Vergereau, Arthur Wong	France
Mass Grave		Noëlle Bastin, Baptiste Bogaert	France
Murmuration		Janneke Swinkels, Tim Frijsinger	Netherlands
My Brother, My Brother		Saad Dnewar, Abdelrahman Dnewar	France, Germany, Egypt
Nest		Stefania Burla	Switzerland
Nesting		Iyanah Bativala	Czech Republic
Nine Times Better	Nio gånger bättre	Lorenzo Follari, Emma Dock	Sweden, Italy
Paleontology Lesson		Sergei Loznitsa	Netherlands
Talk Me		Joecar Hanna	Spain, United States
Tenéis que Verlo		Nacho Solana	Spain
The Bird from Within	O pajaro de dentro	Laura Anahory	Portugal
To the Woods	Un fugue	Agnès Patron	France
Yonne		Julietta Korbel, Yan Ciszewski	Switzerland, France

=== Alumbramiento ===
Highlighted title indicates award winner.

English title	Original title	Director(s)	Production countrie(s)
All the Time		Amélie Derlon Cordina	Belgium
Dragonfly		Paul Andrew Williams	United Kingdom
My Place Is Here	Il mio posto è qui	Daniela Porto, Cristiano Bortone	Italy, Germany
Julian		Cato Kusters	Belgium, Netherlands
My Father's Son	比如父子	Qiu Sheng	China, France
Renovation	Renovacija	Gabrielė Urbonaitė	Lithuania, Latvia, Belgium
Sweetheart	Gioia mia	Margherita Spampinato	Italy
The Herd	Tarika	Milko Lazarov	Bulgaria, Germany, Luxembourg
The Girls We Want	Les Filles désir	Prïncia Car	France

=== Embrujo ===
Highlighted title indicates award winner.

English title	Original title	Director(s)	Production countrie(s)
A Balcony in Limoges	Un balcon à Limoges	Jérôme Reybaud	France
Alarm Notes		Anthea Kennedy, Ian Wiblin	United Kingdom, Germany
Balane 3		Ico Costa	Portugal, France
Balentes		Giovanni Columbu	Italy, Germany
Before/After	Avant/Après	Manoël Dupont	Belgium
Cosmos		Germinal Roaux	Switzerland, France, Mexico
Dandelion's Odyssey	Planètes	Momoko Seto	France, Belgium
Don't Let the Sun		Jacqueline Zünd	Switzerland, Italy
Gen_		Gianluca Matarrese	France, Italy, Switzerland
The Lake	Le Lac	Fabrice Aragno	Switzerland
Life After Siham	La Vie après Siham	Namir Abdel Messeeh	France, Egypt
Olivia		Sofía Petersen	Argentina, Spain, United Kingdom
Ouro e Oásis		Sebastião Borges	Portugal
Quién vio los templos caer		Lucía Selva	Spain
We Are Two Abysses		Kopal Joshy	Portugal
Writing Life: Annie Ernaux Through the Eyes of High School Students	Écrire la vie - Annie Ernaux racontée par des lycéennes et des lycéens	Claire Simon	France

=== Essentials ===
English title	Original title	Director(s)	Production countrie(s)
The Saragossa Manuscript (1965)	Rękopis znaleziony w Saragossie	Wojciech Has	Poland
The Name of the Rose (1986)		Jean-Jacques Annaud	Italy, France, West Germany
The Hourglass Sanatorium (1973)	Sanatorium pod klepsydrą	Wojciech Has	Poland
The Confession (1970)	L'aveu	Costa-Gavras	France, Italy
The NeverEnding Story	Die unendliche Geschichte	Wolfgang Petersen	West Germany, United States
Z (1969)		Costa-Gavras	France, Algeria
Dr. Strangelove (1964)		Stanley Kubrick	United States

=== Rampa ===
Highlighted title indicates award winner.

English title	Original title	Director(s)	Production countrie(s)
Comeback		Jan Roosens, Raf Roosens	Belgium
Drifting Laurent	Laurent dans le vent	Mattéo Eustachon, Léo Couture, Anton Balekdjian	France
Els Mals Noms		Marc Ortiz Prades	Spain
God Will Not Help	Bog Neće Pomoći	Hana Jušić	Croatia, Italy, Romania, Greece, France, Slovenia
Imago		Déni Oumar Pitsaev	France, Belgium
Ish		Imran Perretta	United Kingdom
Letters from Wolf Street	Listy z Wilczej	Arjun Talwar	Poland, Germany
My Father's Shadow		Akinola Davies Jr.	United Kingdom, Nigeria
Perla		Alexandra Makárová	Austria, Slovakia
Short Summer		Nastia Korkia	Germany, France, Serbia
Silent Rebellion	À bras-le-corps	Marie-Elsa Sgualdo	Switzerland, Belgium, France
Silent Storms	Les tempêtes	Dania Reymond-Boughenou	Belgium, France
Straight Circle		Oscar Hudson	United Kingdom
The Kidnapping of Arabella	Il rapimento di Arabella	Carolina Cavalli	Italy
The Last One for the Road	Le città di pianura	Francesco Sossai	Italy, Germany
Vitrival		Noëlle Bastin, Baptiste Bogaert	Belgium

=== Andalusian Panorama Films ===
Highlighted title indicates award winner.

English title	Original title	Director(s)	Production countrie(s)
Antonio, el Bailarín de España		Paco Ortiz	Spain
The Heaven of Animals	El cielo de los animales	Santiago Amodeo	Spain
Ellas en la ciudad		Reyes Gallegos	Spain
En Silencio		Sara Sálamo	Spain
Golpes		Rafael Cobos	Spain
La Marisma		Manu Trillo	Spain
Amira's Land	La tierra de Amira	Roberto Jiménez	Spain
Los Pinceles de la Baronesa		Mauricio Angulo, Julio Muñoz	Spain
No Sea Tu Falta		Moisés Salama	Spain
Plaza Nueva a las Diez		Carmen Tortosa	Spain
Rabioso		Luis María Ferrández	Spain
Sueños Flamencos		Juanma Suárez	Spain
Tiempo entre Olivos		Fany de la Chica	Spain
The Stepmother's Bond	Tras el verano	Yolanda Centeno	Spain
Una Película de Miedo		Sergio Oksman	Spain

=== Andalusian Panorama Shorts ===
Highlighted title indicates award winner.

English title	Original title	Director(s)	Production countrie(s)
Acción, Figuración		Pablo Cueto	Spain
All You Need is Love		Dany Ruz	Spain
Allí, Lejos de Aquí		Pedro Gondi	Spain, Germany
De Madrid al Cielo		Pablo Pérez	Spain
Desenterrar un Rosal		Bruno Ojeda	Spain
Discordia		Álvaro Amante	Spain
Ei, Temi		Jesús Minchón, Marta Aguilella, Arnau Belloc	Spain
El Amoragaor		Adrián Ordóñez	Spain
El Lado Más Bestia de la Vida		José Antonio Campos Aguilera	Spain
Fuera del Agua		Aly Fresno	Spain
Gilbert		Arturo Lacal, Alex Salu, Jordi Jiménez	Spain
Happy Hour		Nico Romero, Álvaro Monje	Spain
Jueves de Marzo		Luis Murillo Arias	Spain
La Cura		Rosendo M. Diezma	Spain
La Sangre		Joaquín León	Spain
Las Desqueridas		Charlie García Villalba, Gonzalo Ruiz Esteban	Spain
Lo Que Desaparece		Nono Ayuso, Rodrigo Inad	Spain, Argentina, Mexico, United Kingdom, United States
One-Way Circle		Alicia Núñez Puerto	Spain, Portugal
Quejío de Loba		Andrea Ganfornina	Spain
Relax		JL Maldonado	Spain
Romance de la Luna, Luna		Jimena R. Herrera	Spain
¿Quién Mató a la Cucaracha?		Juan Escribano Tamayo	Spain

=== European Film Academy Selection ===
Highlighted title indicates Audience Award winner.

English title	Original title	Director(s)	Production countrie(s)
Eagles of the Republic		Tarik Saleh	Sweden, France, Denmark
Franz		Agnieszka Holland	Czech Republic, Germany, Poland
Good Valley Stories	Historias del buen valle	José Luis Guerin	Spain, France
Little Amélie or the Character of Rain	Amélie et la métaphysique des tubes	Maïlys Vallade, Liane-Cho Han	France
Little Trouble Girls	Kaj ti je deklica	Urška Djukić	Slovenia, Italy, Croatia, Serbia
Nouvelle Vague		Richard Linklater	United States, France
Orphan	Árva	László Nemes	Hungary, United Kingdom, Germany, France
Sanatorium		Gar O'Rourke	Ireland, Ukraine, France
Sirāt		Oliver Laxe	Spain, France
Sound of Falling	In die Sonne schauen	Mascha Schilinski	Germany
The Love That Remains	Ástin Sem Eftir Er	Hlynur Pálmason	Iceland
A Poet	Un poeta	Simón Mesa Soto	Colombia, Germany, Sweden
Sentimental Value	Affeksjonsverdi	Joachim Trier	Norway, France, Denmark, Germany

== Awards ==
The following awards were presented:

=== Official competition ===
- Golden Giraldillo: We Believe You by Charlotte Devillers and Arnaud Dufeys
- Grand Jury Prize: DJ Ahmet by Georgi M. Unkovski
- Best Director: Cherien Dabis for All That's Left of You
- Best Actor: Arif Jakup for DJ Ahmet
- Best Actress: Myriem Akheddiou for We Believe You
- Best Screenplay: Charlotte Devillers and Arnaud Dufeys for We Believe You
- Best Cinematography: Angello Faccini for The Anatomy of the Horses
- Best Editing: Hansjörg Weissbrich for Late Shift
- Best Production Design: Juan Pablo Garay for The Anatomy of the Horses

=== Other official awards ===
- Puerta América Award: Sentimental Value by Joachim Trier
- Embrujo Award: Life After Siham by Namir Abdel Messeeh
- European Film Academy Selection – Audience Award: Little Amélie or the Character of Rain by Maïlys Vallade and Liane-Cho Han
- AC/E Award for Best Spanish Director: Marc Ortiz Prades for Els Mals Noms
- Queer Ocaña Award: Els Mals Noms by Marc Ortiz Prades
- Rampa Award: My Father's Shadow by Akinola Davies Jr.
- Alumbramiento Award: Renovation by Gabrielė Urbonaitė
- Best Short Film: In Her Arms by Roman Volosevych
- Best Animated Film: The Bird from Within by Laura Anahory
- Panorama Andaluz Award for Best Film: Golpes by Rafael Cobos
  - Panorama Andaluz Award – Special Mention: No Sea Tu Falta by Moisés Salama
- Panorama Andaluz Award for Best Documentary: Tiempo entre Olivos by Fany de la Chica
- Rosario Valpuesta Award for Best Andalusian Short Film: Allí, Lejos de Aquí by Pedro Gondi
- Rosario Valpuesta Award for Artistic Contribution: Las Desqueridas by Charlie García Villalba and Gonzalo Ruiz Esteban
- ASECAN Award for Best Feature Film Screenplay: Rafael Cobos and Fernando Navarro for Golpes & Mauricio Angulo and Julio Muñoz for Los Pinceles de la Baronesa
- ASECAN Award for Best Short Film Screenplay: Pablo Cueto for Acción, Figuración & Álvaro Amate and Jaime Tigeras for Discordia
- AAMMA Women in Focus Award: We Believe You by Charlotte Devillers and Arnaud Dufeys & The Girls We Want by Prïncia Car
- Cinéfilos del Futuro Award: Awakening Beauty by Manuel H. Martín and Amparo Martínez Barco
- Europa Junior Award: Mascotas al Rescate by Benoît Daffis and Jean-Christian Tassy
