= Amy Loughren =

American nurse who helped stop a serial killer

- Occupation: Nurse
- Known for: assisting in the arrest and prosecution of serial murderer Charlie Cullen.

Amy Loughren is an American reiki master and former registered nurse who is known for assisting in the arrest and prosecution of serial murderer Charlie Cullen.

Before his apprehension, Cullen and Loughren were friends who both worked the night shift in the intensive care unit at Somerset Medical Center in Somerville, New Jersey. Loughren was a single mother of two children and hiding her cardiomyopathy from her employers, with some help from Cullen, in whom she confided.

In 2003, Loughren was approached by detectives who suspected Cullen of poisoning hospital patients. The patient who triggered law enforcement interest was Florian Gall. As a patient at Somerset Medical, Gall had been improving, then he suddenly died of a massive heart attack. An autopsy showed that he had been administered digoxin. It was not on his prescription list. In small doses, digoxin can improve heart function, but the amount Gall had received was lethal. After consulting with her 11-year-old daughter, Loughren agreed to assist law enforcement.

Independent of the police investigation, Loughren noticed that Cullen's medical charting was irregular. It was at points muddled and hasty, and there were frequent misspellings. The hospital's tracking system also showed Loughren that Cullen spent unusual amounts of time on the files of other nurses' patients.

As part of the investigation into Cullen, Loughren met with him at a diner, wearing a wire. Because she had just had a pacemaker installed, police did not want her to wear the wire, but she insisted. “The truth is I didn’t know how this would affect my heart, but I knew I needed to go in there and get that confession,” she said in an interview with Vanity Fair. During Loughren's meeting with Cullen in the diner, he did not overtly admit to the murders, but he said that he would "go down fighting." The evidence from the meeting allowed police to then arrest Cullen. After he was arrested, Loughren encouraged him to make a full confession, which then supported his convictions for 29 murders.

Loughren struggled with the fact that her friend was a serial murderer and with her role in apprehending him: "And he wasn't a mercy killer. He was a cold-blooded murderer. And for me to not have seen that, I really did struggle."

== Personal life ==
Loughren was a single mother of two daughters, and she is now a grandmother. While employed as a nurse, she developed cardiomyopathy which she hid from her employers, to protect her job and her health insurance, and kept working contrary to medical advice. In 2008, Loughren had an experimental heart surgery, and her health has improved.

== In popular culture ==
The Netflix film The Good Nurse is a biopic about the apprehension of Charles Cullen, but it focuses on Loughren rather than the killer. It is based on the 2013 book The Good Nurse: A True Story of Medicine, Madness, and Murder by Charles Graeber. Loughren is played by Jessica Chastain in the movie.

Loughren also was featured in the documentary film Capturing the Killer Nurse, which began streaming on Netflix on November 11, 2022.
