= Utsav Lal =

Musician (b. 1992)

Utsav Lal, pianist, at Richmond Folk Festival in Richmond, VA, October, 9, 2026

Utsav Lal (Hindi: उत्सव लाल; born August 18, 1992) is an Indian pianist, educator, composer, and performing musician. Based in Brooklyn, New York, his work on the piano has been influenced by Dhrupad and Indian classical music.

== Education ==
Utsav Lal holds a Bachelors in Jazz from the Royal Conservatoire of Scotland, Glasgow and a Masters in Contemporary Improvisation from the New England Conservatory of Music, Boston.

== Career ==
Lal has performed piano concerts with a repertoire of Indian ragas at Carnegie Hall, New York, John F. Kennedy Center, Washington DC, India Habitat Centre, New Delhi, KonsertHuset, Sweden, and Southbank Centre, London.

Lal won Ireland's MAMA Award (2008) for Multiculturalism in the individual category, Yamaha Jazz Scholar award (2014), TiE Aspire Young Indian Achiever Award (2012) and was named a Young Steinway Artist (2010) by piano-makers, Steinway & Sons.

Indian record label Times Music released his debut album Piano Moods of Indian Ragas in 2008. Subsequent album releases are "Ragas Dance off Piano Keys", "Ragas Al Pianoforte", "Ragas to Reels", and a solo recording of ragas on the "Fluid Piano", released by the "Fluid Piano" tuning label (2016). Lal released his sixth album, Indian Classical Music on the Piano, featuring tabla player Nitin Mitta in November 2018. He has collaborated with Martin Hayes & Dennis Cahill, Sam Comerford, Dave Sheridan, Winifred Horan and is recognised for his "Ragas to Reels" concert tours that bring together Indian classical music and Traditional Irish music in a piano and flute combination. He has also performed in collaboration with Indian sitar player, Hidayat Hussain Khan, violinist Sharat Chandra Srivastava, percussionists, Talvin Singh, Pt. Samir Chatterjee, and flautist, Rakesh Chaurasia. violinist L.Shankar, violinist Kala Ramnath and George Brooks.

Lal has conducted performance workshops at Global Music Institute, India and "Breaking Boundaries" workshop series in India.

Lal is the composer for feature film Olivia, directed by Argentine filmmaker Sofía Petersen. The film, a co-production between Argentina, UK and Spain, premiered at the 78th Locarno Film Festival in August 2025 and earned four nominations.

Lal is the composer/performer for One Beautiful Thing by Australian circus arts theatre company CIRCA, debuting for AsiaTOPA Festival at the Arts Centre Melbourne in February 2017.

== See also ==
- Indians in the New York City metropolitan area
