= The Good Nurse =

2022 crime drama film by Tobias Lindholm

- Official release poster
- Directed by: Tobias Lindholm
- Screenplay by: Krysty Wilson-Cairns
- Based on: The Good Nurse by Charles Graeber
- Produced by: Scott Franklin; Darren Aronofsky; Michael A. Jackman
- Starring: Jessica Chastain; Eddie Redmayne; Nnamdi Asomugha; Kim Dickens; Noah Emmerich
- Cinematography: Jody Lee Lipes
- Edited by: Adam Nielsen
- Music by: Biosphere
- Production companies: Protozoa Pictures; FilmNation Entertainment
- Distributed by: Netflix
- Release dates: September 11, 2022 (TIFF); October 19, 2022 (United States); October 26, 2022 (Netflix)
- Running time: 121 minutes
- Country: United States
- Language: English

The Good Nurse is a 2022 American thriller film starring Jessica Chastain and Eddie Redmayne, about the serial killer Charles Cullen and the fellow nurse who suspects him. The film is based on the 2013 true-crime book of the same name by Charles Graeber. It is directed by Tobias Lindholm and written by Krysty Wilson-Cairns. The film also stars Nnamdi Asomugha, Kim Dickens, and Noah Emmerich.

The Good Nurse had its world premiere at the 47th Toronto International Film Festival on September 11, 2022, and was released in select theaters on October 19, before streaming on Netflix on October 26, 2022. The film received positive reviews from critics, with particular praise towards Redmayne's performance for which he was nominated for a Golden Globe Award, a British Academy Film Award, and a Screen Actors Guild Award.

== Plot ==
In 2003, Amy Loughren is a single mother and nurse working in the intensive care unit (ICU) at Parkfield Memorial Hospital in New Jersey, who is suffering from cardiomyopathy, unbeknownst to anyone at the hospital, and fears dismissal. Having no health insurance, Amy has no other choice than to remain working for another four months, in order to acquire the insurance to afford a heart transplant. The hospital recruits experienced nurse Charles Cullen to help her work the night shifts, and they quickly become good friends. Charlie discovers her condition and empathetically agrees to keep it a secret.

When an elderly patient named Ana Martínez, who was being looked after by Amy and Charlie, suddenly dies, the hospital's administrative board contacts the state police, represented by detectives Danny Baldwin and Tim Braun. However, the board, led by risk manager Linda Garran, quickly downplays it, claiming the death was unintentional and that the reason for reporting it was simply to abide by health protocol. Baldwin is immediately wary of the situation, noting they reported Martinez's death seven weeks after its occurrence after the body had been cremated. He fixates on Charlie and discovers he had been convicted of minor charges in 1995. They question Amy who notices that insulin had been administered to Martinez, demonstrated by her decreased C peptide levels, despite her being a non-diabetic. She is questioned about Charlie's character but Amy is quick to challenge them. She doesn't want to be involved in the situation and clearly trusts her colleague.

Baldwin and Braun attempt to contact the hospitals where Charlie had worked previously but none are willing to cooperate. Parkfield finally shares its investigation with the police, but Baldwin notices that it is fragmentary, leading him to snap at Garran, causing him and Braun to be banned from the hospital. Meanwhile, after Kelly Anderson, another ICU patient suffers a seizure and inexplicably dies, Amy discovers insulin had also been administered to her the night before. Suspicious, she contacts an old friend, Lori Lucas, a fellow nurse who worked with Charlie at a different hospital. Lori reveals that during Charlie's employment, the ward he was assigned to dealt with numerous sudden deaths, with the discovery of insulin in several of them. Shocked, Amy raids Parkfield's storage, discovering holes in several IV bags, indicating they had been contaminated. During her discovery, she collapses and ends up in the ER.

Finally convinced of Charlie's complicity, she alerts the detectives. They convince Kelly's husband to exhume her body in order to perform an autopsy; it reveals a dual combination of insulin and digoxin led to her death. Meanwhile, Garran fires Charlie under the pretext of minor discrepancies found in his résumé. In an attempt to entice Charlie into disclosing his actions, Baldwin and Braun have Amy arrange a meeting with him, but he reacts aggressively when she asks about his dismissal from Parkfield.

The police arrest and hold him, but are unable to get him to confess on record. Unwilling to see him released, Amy volunteers to talk to Charlie; she has a warm conversation with him, and asks that he tells the truth. After some deliberation, Charlie confesses, stating that he simply "did it". When Amy asks why, he says, "they didn't stop me."

A textual epilogue reveals Charlie was sentenced to 18 consecutive life sentences for the murders of 29 patients but that the actual number could be as high as 400. Amy underwent the heart surgery she needed, and now lives in Florida with her daughters and grandchildren.

== Cast ==
- Jessica Chastain as Amy Loughren, a single mother and nurse at Parkfield Memorial Hospital, who is also a cardiomyopathy patient.
- Eddie Redmayne as Charles Cullen, an experienced nurse who is new to Parkfield's medical staff and secretly a prolific serial killer.
- Nnamdi Asomugha as Danny Baldwin, a state police detective assigned to investigate the case of mysterious deaths at Parkfield.
- Noah Emmerich as Tim Braun, another state police detective and Baldwin's partner, also assigned to investigate the Parkfield case.
- Kim Dickens as Linda Garran, Parkfield's risk manager and former nurse, who seeks to preserve Parkfield's reputation in the wake of the deaths.
- Malik Yoba as Sam Johnson, the local police chief and superior officer to Braun and Baldwin.
- Maria Dizzia as Lori Lucas, a nurse who is a friend and former coworker of Amy's.

== Production ==
The film was announced in November 2016, with Tobias Lindholm set to direct and Krysty Wilson-Cairns writing the screenplay adapting Charles Graeber's 2013 non-fiction book The Good Nurse: A True Story of Medicine, Madness, and Murder. Lionsgate was initially set to distribute. In August 2018, Jessica Chastain and Eddie Redmayne entered negotiations to star in the film.

No further development on the film was announced until February 2020. Chastain and Redmayne were confirmed to star, with Lionsgate no longer involved. Netflix entered negotiations to buy the film's worldwide distribution rights for $25 million.

In March 2021, Nnamdi Asomugha was added to the cast, with Noah Emmerich and Kim Dickens joining in April.

Filming began on April 12, 2021, in Stamford, Connecticut.

== Reception ==
On the review aggregator website Rotten Tomatoes, 74% of 168 critics' reviews are positive, with an average rating of 6.7/10. The website's consensus reads: "The Good Nurse is hobbled by stilted dialogue and unrealistic story elements, but those issues are offset by strong work from a pair of talented leads." Metacritic, which uses a weighted average, assigned the film a score of 65 out of 100, based on 38 critics, indicating "generally favorable" reviews.

Filmmaker Thomas Vinterberg praised the film, calling it "an accomplished, rigorous and gripping experience."

The Good Nurse was the most-viewed film on Netflix on October 27, 2022, the day after its release. In its first week, it debuted at number one on Netflix's Top 10 with 68.31 million viewing hours with it being Top 10 in 93 countries. The next week, it dropped to second, behind Enola Holmes 2, having received 36.78 million viewing hours.

=== Accolades ===
Award	Date of ceremony	Category	Recipient(s)	Result	Ref.
Golden Globe Awards	January 10, 2023	Best Supporting Actor – Motion Picture	Eddie Redmayne	Nominated	
Greater Western New York Film Critics Association Awards	December 30, 2022	Best Supporting Actor	Eddie Redmayne	Nominated	
Satellite Awards	February 11, 2023	Best Actress – Motion Picture	Jessica Chastain	Nominated	
Satellite Awards	February 11, 2023	Best Supporting Actor – Motion Picture	Eddie Redmayne	Nominated	
British Academy Film Awards	February 19, 2023	Best Actor in a Supporting Role	Eddie Redmayne	Nominated	
Screen Actors Guild Awards	February 26, 2023	Outstanding Performance by a Male Actor in a Supporting Role	Eddie Redmayne	Nominated	

== See also ==
- Capturing the Killer Nurse – 2022 documentary by Tim Travers Hawkins
