= The Anatomy of the Horses =

- Promotional release poster
- Spanish: La anatomía de los caballos
- Directed by: Daniel Vidal Toche
- Written by: Daniel Vidal Toche; Ignacio Vuelta
- Produced by: Ignacio Vuelta; Roberto Butragueño
- Starring: Juan Quispe; Edith Ramos
- Cinematography: Angello Faccini
- Edited by: Carlos Cañas Carreira; Daniel Vidal Toche
- Music by: Inur Artegui
- Production companies: Playa Chica; Pioneros Producciones; Elamedia; Mito Films; Los Niños Films; Promenades Films
- Distributed by: Sideral Cinema (Spain)
- Release dates: July 6, 2025 (KVIFF); November 26, 2026 (Peru)
- Running time: 106 minutes
- Countries: Peru; Spain; Colombia; France
- Languages: Spanish; Quechua

The Anatomy of the Horses (Spanish: La anatomía de los caballos) is a 2025 magical realism drama film co-written, co-edited and directed by Daniel Vidal Toche in his directorial debut. It stars Juan Quispe and Edith Ramos. It is a co-production between Peru, Spain, Colombia and France.

== Synopsis ==
Ángel Pumacahua, an 18th-century revolutionary, arrives in 21st-century Peru after a cosmic event and joins a llama herder in searching for answers about a disappearance.

== Cast ==
- Juan Quispe as Ángel Pumacahua
- Edith Ramos as Eustaquia
- Memé Nuñez
- Felipe García
- Adrián García
- Gladis Conde

== Release ==
The film premiered worldwide on July 6, 2025, at the 59th Karlovy Vary International Film Festival, then screened on November 11 at the 22nd Seville European Film Festival, on November 24 at the 43rd Torino Film Festival, on March 20, 2026, at the 5th LATcinemaFest, and on August 10 at the 30th Lima Film Festival.

The film is scheduled for commercial release on November 26, 2026, in Peruvian theaters.

== Accolades ==
| Award / Festival | Date of ceremony | Category | Recipient(s) | Result | Ref. |
|---|---|---|---|---|---|
| Karlovy Vary International Film Festival | 12 July 2025 | PROXIMA Grand Prix | The Anatomy of the Horses | Nominated | |
| Seville European Film Festival | 15 November 2025 | Golden Giraldillo | The Anatomy of the Horses | Nominated | |
| Seville European Film Festival | 15 November 2025 | Best Cinematography | Angello Faccini | Won | |
| Seville European Film Festival | 15 November 2025 | Best Production Design | Juan Pablo Garay | Won | |
| Torino Film Festival | 29 November 2025 | Best Film | The Anatomy of the Horses | Nominated | |
| Torino Film Festival | 29 November 2025 | FIPRESCI Award | The Anatomy of the Horses | Won | |
| Lima Film Festival | 15 August 2026 | Trophy Spondylus | The Anatomy of the Horses | Pending | |
