= Olivia (2025 film) =

2025 Argentinian film

- Theatrical release poster painted in oils by Alejandra Viviana Aranda
- Directed by: Sofía Petersen
- Written by: Sofía Petersen
- Produced by: Shaun Finneran
- Starring: Tina Sconochini
- Cinematography: Owain Wilshaw
- Edited by: Sofía Petersen
- Music by: Utsav Lal
- Production companies: Animitas; Vitrine Filmes
- Release date: 13 August 2025 (Locarno)
- Running time: 126 minutes
- Countries: Argentina; United Kingdom; Spain
- Language: Spanish

Olivia is a 2025 film written, directed and edited by Argentine filmmaker Sofía Petersen.

Shot in 16mm Ektachrome, in south Argentina, Tierra del Fuego, with a crew of 6 and over 40 local non-actors. It is Petersen's first feature film.

The film had its premiere at the 78th Locarno Film Festival on 13 August 2025, as part of Concoso Cineasti del Presente section, where it was nominated for a Golden Leopard – Filmmakers of the Present.

It is the first feature to be shot entirely in 16mm Ektachrome since 1998.

== Cast ==
- Tina Sconochini as Olivia
- Dario del Carmer Haro Santana as Father
- Carolina Tejeda as Mari
- The Workers of the Municipal Slaughterhouse of Río Grande

== Synopsis ==
Alone in the mountains: Olivia, her father, and their home. By the foothills, a slaughterhouse, where father works. She dreams by day and lives by night; they share only dusks and dawns before the rising sun lulls her to sleep. When father disappears, Olivia descends the mountains in search of him.

== Production ==
The film was one of two recipients of the Hubert Bals Fund+Europe program of the International Film Festival of Rotterdam post-production support in 2024. It is an Animitas (Argentina/United Kingdom) co-production with Vitrines Films (Spain).

== Reception ==
Giona A. Nazzaro, artistic director of the Locarno Film Festival, regarded Olivia as "one of the strongest of all films in the entire edition of Locarno" in the 2025 Official Selection announcement.

Travis Jeppesen of Sight and Sound magazine wrote that "Olivia doesn’t really look like anything else on the cinematic landscape, implying that the New Argentine Cinema might have found its latest descendant in Sofía Petersen".

For Micropsia, Diego Lerer wrote, "mysterious and evocative, Olivia is a distinctly original and personal Argentine film, the kind that reveals a filmmaker with a singular creative world. Complex and ever-shifting, it can be viewed linearly as the story of a woman’s search for her father, but it also seems intent on conveying an atmosphere—a set of sensations—rooted in a specific place: Argentina’s Patagonia, inhabited by curious characters and prone to the unexpected". He stated that Olivia "marks the arrival of an Argentine director who is sure to spark conversation in the years ahead".

Kiara Warmerdam of Caligari magazine remarked that "beyond the beauty of the film and the depth it offers, it's inevitable to highlight the precision with which it's crafted. When conceiving a shot, one can draw an analogy with the work of a painter. One can look at a painting as one looks at a shot. Olivia's shots reminded me of the painter's craft. The painter chooses, creates every detail that appears in the painting. The film's control over the elements that have the privilege of appearing is remarkable".

== Awards and nominations ==
Award	Year	Category	Recipient(s)	Result
Locarno Film Festival	2025	Golden Leopard - Filmmakers of the Present	Olivia	Nominated
Locarno Film Festival	2025	Swatch First Feature Award	Olivia	Nominated
São Paulo International Film Festival	2025	New Directors Competition	Olivia	Nominated
Seville European Film Festival	2025	Embrujo	Olivia	Nominated
Karlovy Vary International Film Festival	2026	Imagina	Olivia	Nominated
San Diego Underground Film Festival	2026	Feature Film	Olivia	Won
Puerto Rico Film Festival	2026	Best Director of International Feature Film	Olivia	Won
