= Nest (2025 film) =

2025 Swiss short film

- Promotional poster
- Directed by: Stefania Burla
- Screenplay by: Johannes Jordan; Fabiana Seitz; Stefania Burla
- Produced by: Fabiana Seitz
- Starring: Anouk Petri; Sarah Juliana Bahmou; Aira Venzi; Keira Jöhr
- Cinematography: Balz Auf der Maur
- Edited by: Laura Rodríguez Pérez
- Music by: Ksenia Ignatenko; Yanick Herzog
- Production company: Zürcher Hochschule der Künste (ZHdK)
- Distributed by: Lights On
- Release date: 15 August 2025 (Locarno)
- Running time: 20 minutes
- Country: Switzerland
- Language: Swiss German

Nest is a 2025 Swiss short drama film, co-written and directed by Stefania Burla. Starring Anouk Petri, the film follows fifteen-year-old Selma, who feels crushed by her mother's expectations, by those of the Catholic village in the Swiss mountains where she lives, and ultimately by her own.

The film had its world premiere in the Concorso Nazionale of the Pardi di Domani competition of the 78th Locarno Film Festival on 15 August 2025, where it was nominated for the Pardino d’Oro SRG SSR for the Best Swiss Short Film.

== Cast ==
- Anouk Petri as Selma
- Sarah Juliana Bahmou as Luisa
- Aira Venzi as Michelle
- Keira Jöhr as Olivia
- Ruben Otth as Tobias
- Nicolas De Peri as Ramon
- Barbara Terpoorten as Marianne

== Release ==
Nest had its World Premiere at the Concorso Nazionale portion of the Pardi di Domani competition of the 78th Locarno Film Festival on 15 August 2025, and competed for the Pardino d’Oro SRG SSR for the Best Swiss Short Film.

It was screened on 9 November 2025 at the 22nd Seville European Film Festival, and then on 13 November 2025, it was screened in the Festivals in the Spotlight Film program at the Zagreb Film Festival.

== Accolades ==
Award	Date of ceremony	Category	Recipient	Result	Ref.
Locarno Film Festival	16 August 2025	Pardino d’Oro SRG SSR for the Best Swiss Short Film	Nest	Nominated	
