= Charles Cullen =

American serial killer (born 1960)

- Mugshot of Charles Cullen
- Born: Charles Edmund Cullen; February 22, 1960 (age 66); West Orange, New Jersey, U.S.
- Occupation: Nurse
- Spouse: Adrianne Baum (m. 1987; div. 1993)
- Children: 3
- Convictions: New Jersey; Murder (22 counts); Pennsylvania; First degree murder (7 counts)
- Penalty: 18 consecutive life sentences, with the eligibility of parole after June 10, 2403

Details
- Victims: 29 confirmed; several hundred more suspected and six more attempts
- Span of crimes: 1988–2003
- Country: United States
- States: New Jersey; Pennsylvania
- Date apprehended: December 15, 2003

Charles Edmund Cullen (born February 22, 1960) is an American serial killer. While working as a nurse, Cullen murdered dozens—possibly hundreds—of patients during a 16-year career spanning several New Jersey and Pennsylvania medical centers until finally being arrested in 2003. He confessed to committing as many as 40 murders at least 29 of which have been confirmed, though interviews with police, psychiatrists and journalists suggest he committed many more. Researchers have suggested that Cullen may have murdered as many as 400 people. However, most murders cannot be confirmed due to lack of records.

== Early life ==
Charles Cullen was born in West Orange, New Jersey, the youngest of eight children. His father, Edmond, a bus driver, died on September 17, 1960, when Charles was seven months old. His childhood was impoverished; Cullen later described it as "miserable" and claimed to have been constantly bullied by his schoolmates and sisters' boyfriends. He made the first of many suicide attempts when he was approximately nine years old, drinking chemicals from a chemistry set. Cullen's mother, Florence Cullen (née Ward), was born in England and emigrated to the US after World War II as a war bride. She was killed in a car accident on December 6, 1977, when Cullen was 17 and a junior in high school. He claimed that he was not immediately informed of her death, and instead of returning the body to the family, the hospital chose to cremate her.

The following year, Cullen graduated from West Orange High School and enlisted in the United States Navy. He served aboard the submarine USS Woodrow Wilson. He successfully passed basic training and the psychological examinations required for submarine crews (who were expected to spend as long as two months at a time being submerged in a cramped vessel). Cullen rose to the rank of petty officer second class as part of the team that operated the vessel's Poseidon missiles. He did not fit in during his time in the Navy and was hazed and (like his school days) bullied by his fellow crewmen.

A year into his service, Cullen's leading petty officer aboard Woodrow Wilson discovered him seated at the missile controls wearing a surgical gown, mask, and gloves rather than his uniform. Cullen was disciplined for that action but never explained why he had dressed that way. The Navy reassigned him to a lower-pressure job on the supply ship USS Canopus. He attempted suicide and was committed to the Navy psychiatric ward several times for depression before being discharged in 1984 for undisclosed reasons.

Soon after his discharge, Cullen enrolled at Mountainside Hospital's nursing school in Montclair, New Jersey. He graduated in 1987 and started work at the burn unit of Saint Barnabas Medical Center in Livingston, New Jersey.

Shortly before securing his nursing license in 1987, Cullen married Adrienne Taub, a computer programmer. The first of their two children was born later that year.

== Murders ==
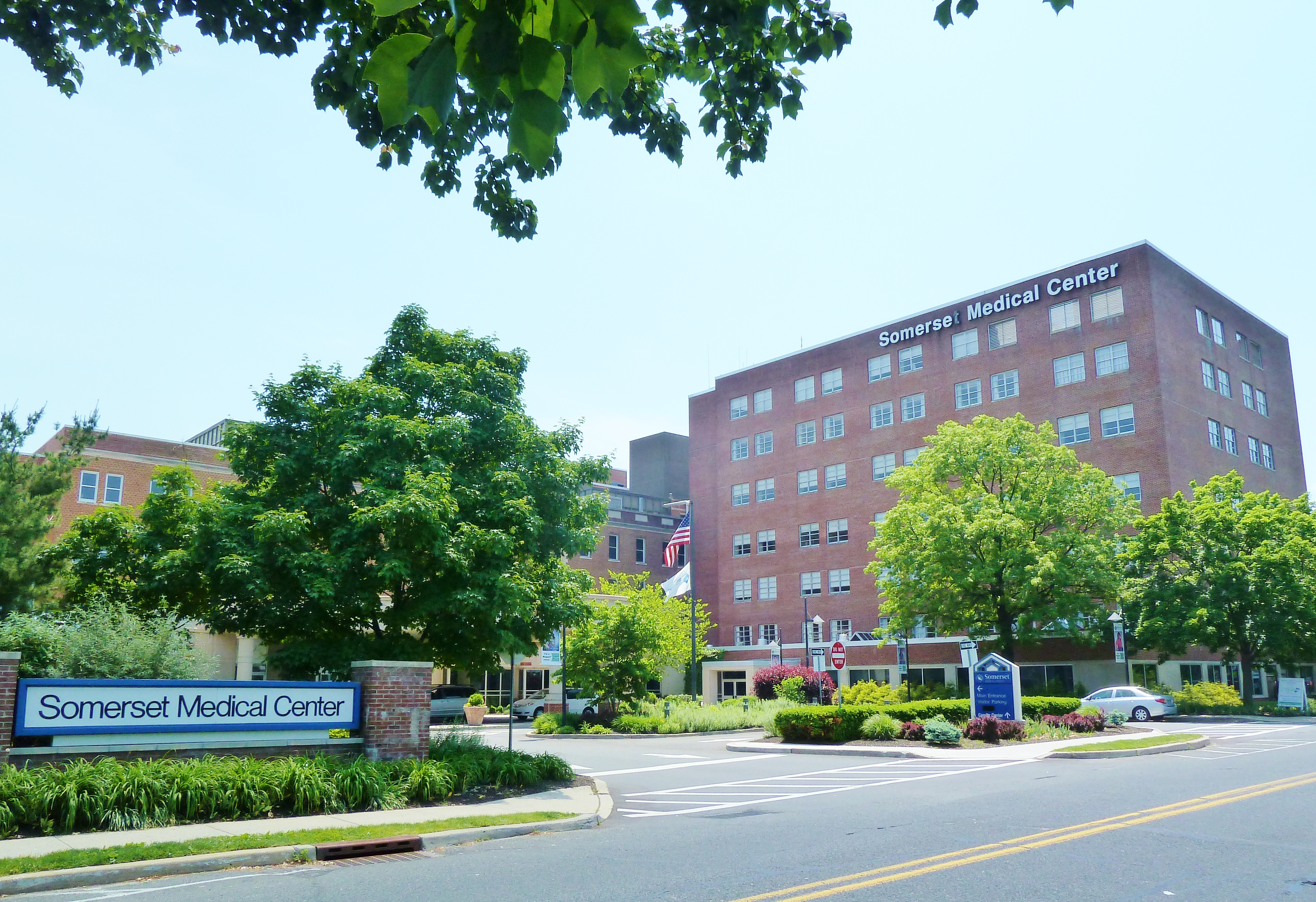
Somerset Medical Center

The first murders to which Cullen later confessed occurred at Saint Barnabas. On June 11, 1988, he administered a lethal overdose of intravenous medication to a patient. Cullen eventually admitted to killing several other patients at Saint Barnabas, including an AIDS patient who died after Cullen gave him an overdose of insulin. Cullen left Saint Barnabas in January 1992 when the hospital authorities began investigating contaminated IV bags. The investigation later determined that Cullen had most likely been responsible, resulting in dozens of patient deaths at the hospital.

One month after leaving Saint Barnabas, Cullen took a job in the coronary care unit at Warren Hospital in Phillipsburg, New Jersey. In August 1993, a 91-year-old cancer patient at Warren Hospital told her son that Cullen, who was not her assigned nurse, had come into her room and injected her with a needle. She died the next day. The hospital administered a lie detector test to Cullen and several other nurses, which they all passed. He later pleaded guilty to killing her with an injection of digoxin.

Cullen's home life was increasingly disordered. He had a drinking problem, and his wife was disturbed by his unusual behavior and his abuse of the family dogs. In January 1993, she filed for divorce, and four months later she applied for a restraining order against him based on her fear that he might endanger her and their children. The restraining order was granted after Cullen had been treated at two psychiatric institutions. The divorce became final in December 1994, and he moved into a basement apartment in Phillipsburg. In March 1993, Cullen broke into a co-worker's home while she and her young son slept, but he left without waking them. He then began stalking the woman, who filed a police report against him. Cullen subsequently pleaded guilty to trespassing and received one year of probation.

Cullen left Warren Hospital at the end of 1993 and began a three-year stint in the intensive care unit of Hunterdon Medical Center in Flemington, New Jersey, where he received an employee award. He claimed that he did not harm anyone during the first two years at Hunterdon. However, hospital records for that period had been destroyed at the time of his arrest in 2003. Cullen admitted to murdering five patients between January and September 1996, again with overdoses of digoxin. He then found work at Morristown Memorial Hospital but was soon fired for poor performance. Cullen remained unemployed for six months. After seeking treatment for depression in the Warren Hospital emergency room, he was briefly admitted to a psychiatric facility.

In February 1998, Cullen was hired by the Liberty Nursing and Rehabilitation Center in Allentown, Pennsylvania, where he staffed a ward of ventilator-dependent patients. On May 7, 1998, Francis Henry, 83, was transported to the Lehigh Valley Hospital after choking on his own vomit. Henry's nurse at Liberty, Kimberly Pepe, was contacted three times by Lehigh to ask why he had been administered a "toxic dose of insulin." She was fired over the incident within the next two months despite claims that she did not give Henry the medication. In her 2000 wrongful termination lawsuit, Pepe accused Liberty of "violating her civil rights" and accused the hospital of not investigating Cullen, who already had "problems with his performance" and was also working the evening of Henry's death. She reached an out of court settlement with the hospital in 2001, the terms of which were sealed. In December 2003, HCR Manor Care, Liberty's parent company, released a statement denying Pepe's charge regarding Cullen and reported that he was not investigated in May 1998 but was fired for mishandling medication later that year. The spokesperson of Manor Care also confirmed that a 1998 internal investigation did not connect him to Henry's death, and that Cullen was fired after entering the room of another patient he was not assigned to, holding syringes; the patient's arm was broken in the encounter. Cullen filed for bankruptcy in 1998.

After leaving Liberty, Cullen was employed at the Easton Hospital in Northampton County, Pennsylvania, from November 1998 to March 1999. He was hired through a temporary agency called Healthforce of Harrisburg. On December 2, 1998, John R. Sakala, 86, was admitted to the hospital for a persistent cold and "inexplicably" died the following day. During an autopsy, a hospital pathologist found his blood contained "abnormally high level of insulin" but the "extremely low serum glucose level" was not determined to be the cause of death. Sakala's death was not investigated by the county coroner. Between December 29, 1998 and December 31, 1998, Cullen worked two overnight shifts in the hospital's 4 North West wing where Ottomar Schramm, 78, was receiving treatment for a seizure. On December 30, 1998, Schramm's blood tested positive for non-prescribed digoxin. After his death on December 31, 1998, the hospital's owner, Two Rivers Corporation, alerted the Northampton County Coroner Zachary Lysek in January 1999 for further inquiry. Lysek was concerned that Schramm had been a victim of an "angel of death" but his investigation was deemed inconclusive in 2000 after he was informed by the hospital officials that their internal probe had not produced a suspect. In January 2001, Schramm's widow sued the Easton hospital and several other parties in a wrongful death lawsuit.

In March 1999, Cullen took a job at the burn unit of Allentown's Lehigh Valley Hospital–Cedar Crest, where he murdered one patient and attempted to murder another. One month later, he voluntarily resigned from Lehigh and took a job working in the cardiac care unit at St. Luke's Hospital in Bethlehem, Pennsylvania. During the subsequent three years, Cullen murdered at least five patients and is known to have attempted to kill two more. On January 11, 2000, he once again attempted suicide by lighting a charcoal grill in his bathtub and hoped to succumb to carbon monoxide poisoning. His neighbors smelled smoke and called the fire department and police. Cullen was taken to a hospital and a psychiatric facility but returned home the following day.

No one suspected Cullen was murdering patients at St. Luke's until a co-worker found medication vials in a disposal bin. The drugs were not valuable outside the hospital, and since they were not used in recreational drug use, the theft was highly unusual. An investigation showed that Cullen had taken the medication. He was offered a deal by St. Luke's to resign and be given a neutral recommendation, or to be fired. He resigned and was escorted from the building in June 2002. Seven of his coworkers at St. Luke's later alerted the Lehigh County district attorney of their suspicions that he had used drugs to kill patients. Investigators never looked into Cullen's past and the case was dropped nine months later for lack of evidence.

In September 2002, Cullen began working in the critical care unit of the Somerset Medical Center in Somerville, New Jersey. He began dating a local woman around then, but his depression worsened. Cullen had killed at least 13 patients and attempted to kill at least one more by mid-2003, using digoxin, insulin, and epinephrine. On June 18, 2003, he unsuccessfully attempted to murder Somerset patient Philip Gregor, who was later discharged and died six months later of natural causes.

Somerset began to notice Cullen's wrongdoing when he accessed the rooms and computerized records of patients to whom he was not assigned. The hospital's computerized drug-dispensing cabinets showed that he was requesting medications that his patients had not been prescribed. His drug requests included many orders that were immediately canceled and many requests within minutes of one another. In July 2003, the executive director of the New Jersey Poison Information and Education System warned Somerset officials that at least four suspicious overdoses indicated the possibility that an employee was killing patients. By October, Cullen had killed at least five more patients and attempted to kill another.

When a patient in Somerset died of low blood sugar in October 2003, the hospital alerted the New Jersey State Police. That patient was Cullen's final victim. State officials castigated the hospital for failing to report a nonfatal insulin overdose administered by Cullen in August. An investigation into his employment history revealed past suspicions about his involvement in patient deaths. Somerset fired Cullen on October 31, 2003, ostensibly for lying on his job application.

== Arrest and sentencing ==
Cullen was arrested at a restaurant on December 12, 2003, and charged with one count of murder and one count of attempted murder. On December 14, he admitted to homicide detectives Dan Baldwin and Tim Braun that he had murdered Florian Gall and had attempted to murder Jin Kyung Han, both of whom were patients at Somerset. In addition, Cullen told the detectives that he had murdered as many as 40 patients over his 16-year career. In April 2004, Cullen pleaded guilty before Judge Paul W. Armstrong in a New Jersey court to killing 13 patients and to attempting to kill two others by lethal injection while he was employed at Somerset.

As part of his plea agreement, Cullen promised to cooperate with authorities if they did not seek the death penalty for his crimes. A month later, he pleaded guilty to the murder of three more patients in New Jersey. In November 2004, Cullen pleaded guilty in an Allentown court to killing six patients and trying to kill three others. He repeatedly interrupted the proceedings by taunting the judge with the chant, "Your Honor, you need to step down." Cullen was ordered to be restrained and gagged.

On March 2, 2006, in New Jersey, Cullen was sentenced to 18 consecutive life sentences; he is not eligible for parole until June 10, 2388. Currently, he is held at New Jersey State Prison in Trenton, New Jersey. On March 10, 2006, Cullen was brought into the courtroom of Lehigh County (Pennsylvania) Judge William H. Platt for a sentencing hearing. Upset with the judge, Cullen repeatedly said, "Your Honor, you need to step down" for 30 minutes until Platt had Cullen gagged with cloth and duct tape. Even after being gagged, Cullen continued to try to repeat the phrase. In that hearing, Platt gave him an additional six life sentences. Cullen will never be eligible for parole because under Pennsylvania law a life sentence comes without the possibility of parole. As part of his plea agreement, Cullen has been working with law enforcement officials to identify additional victims.

=== Kidney donation ===
In August 2005, while he was awaiting sentencing, Cullen was contacted by Pat Peckham about her son, Ernie, who was suffering from renal failure and undergoing dialysis three days a week. Ernie had contracted strep in 2002 but had not noticed the infection that spread and overloaded the "microscopic filters in both of his kidneys." He was put on a seven-year waiting list for a kidney transplant, and as his health deteriorated, his only other chance at survival was finding a living donor. His friends and family were medically ineligible for donation, and the odds of a "perfect six-for-six tissue-typed match" with a stranger was "incalculably small." After receiving no response to a public-interest plea in a local newspaper, Ernie's mother reached out to Cullen, the estranged ex-boyfriend of her daughter and the father of her grandchild. Cullen knew Ernie who was ten years younger than him, married with four kids, and had a metal-shaping job in Farmingdale. After Somerset county judge Paul Armstrong signed the order for a blood test, Stony Brook University Hospital on Long Island compared Cullen's antigens to that of Ernie's and confirmed that he was a match. Ernie's mother decided to withhold the identity of his donor, believing that her son wouldn't accept the kidney if it came from Cullen.

After the news of him being a match was revealed to the general public, the prosecutor and the victims' families were "up in arms" about Cullen going to a hospital where he could "kill somebody or himself." According to Johnnie Mask, New Jersey's deputy public defender, Cullen was "so determined" to help Ernie that he threatened to cease cooperation with detectives investigating his case, potentially exposing himself to the death penalty. It was also reported that he had threatened to not attend his sentencing hearing unless he was allowed to donate the kidney. Cullen has denied attempting to trade his sentencing appearance for donation. State officials insisted that he undergo sentencing before being allowed to donate his kidney.

After Cullen was sentenced in 2006, judge Armstrong ordered that his kidney be removed in a New Jersey hospital certified by the Department of Corrections and transferred to New York for implantation. The order also required that Ernie's medical insurance cover all costs associated with the donation, and the transplant doctors receive a certification from the New Jersey Board of Medical Examiners for the procedure. In response to the conditions, Mask said that he was "suspicious that someone in the Department of Corrections or the attorney general's office [did] not want [the donation] to happen." He also noted that while he had direct access to the attorney general Peter C. Harvey during the early stages of the negotiation, most "top officials" were later ordered to not speak with him. John Hagerty, spokesperson for the Division of Criminal Justice in the attorney general's office, denied the allegations, saying that the judge's conditions reflected that Cullen was a "not a free man" but a "serial killer" not allowed to travel "willy nilly."

On August 20, 2006, Mask confirmed that a social worker assigned to the case had notified him of the surgery harvesting Cullen's kidney for the donation. Although the name of the hospital at which the procedure had taken place was not revealed for security reasons, Mask suspected it was St. Francis Medical Center in Trenton, which has a secure prison wing. The kidney was flown to Stony Brook University Hospital. Cullen remained hospitalized for several days before returning to the New Jersey State Prison in Trenton.

== Aftermath ==
After his arrest, more than 150 families of patients who died at Somerset Medical Center contacted the law enforcement fearing Cullen's involvement; almost 50 of them were ruled out as potential victims later, according to Somerset County prosecutor Wayne Forrest. St. Luke's University Hospital received 18 calls from anxious former patients or their families, even though only 4 involved patients received treatment at the hospital's cardiac unit while Cullen was employed there.

=== Lawsuits against hospitals ===
In 2008, after four years of litigation, the families of 22 patients believed to be Cullen's victims reached a confidential settlement with Somerset Medical Center, Hunterdon Medical Center and Warren Hospital to end their wrongful-death lawsuits. The hospitals did not admit to wrongdoing in the case, dismissing claims that administrators failed to stop Cullen from murdering patients and to notify authorities when he was suspected of wrongdoing.

In 2005, families of Regina Miller and Marilyn Hall sued the St. Luke's University Hospital, claiming that Cullen murdered the patients while he worked there. Cullen admitted that Miller and Hall were not one of his victims. The lawsuits were dismissed by Lehigh County Court in 2009, and in 2010, an appeals court upheld the ruling. In 2011, St. Luke's countersued both families and their attorneys under Pennsylvania's Dragonetti Act, claiming that the families had no "direct knowledge or evidence" to prove that Cullen was responsible for the deaths of their relatives. The hospital sought to recover $50,000 in punitive damages and over $560,000 in legal costs. The lawsuit was dismissed. The families used the Dragonetti Act to then sue St. Luke's for the second time, claiming that the hospital "misused civil proceedings and acted with gross negligence and without probable cause when suing them." The jury ruled in the families' favor but no financial damages were ordered as part of the verdict. Clifford Haines, representing the families', said that St. Luke's had taken "a very public, and aggressive stance against their former patients." In 2008, a similar lawsuit brought forth by St. Luke's was dismissed by Lehigh County jury, in which the hospital had countersued Ed Shaughnessy, an Easton lawyer. Shaughnessy had first sued St. Luke's for the wrongful death of Franklin Pope, 72, a former patient of the hospital during Cullen's tenure. He dropped the lawsuit in 2007. The hospital then claimed that he had "purposely filed a frivolous lawsuit" even though the case had "no merit."

In March 2010, the Lehigh County jury dismissed St. Luke's from a lawsuit that awarded a $95 million civil judgment against Cullen to families of eight former patients. The families' appealed to overturn the ruling to hold St. Luke's accountable, as Cullen had no assets. In September 2012, the Pennsylvania Supreme Court denied their last appeal. The hospital also countersued the firm behind the case, claiming that the lawsuits were "abusive and frivolous."

In 2012, families of five patients reached a confidential settlement with Cullen and St. Luke's after eight years of litigation. Nine months prior, the hospital had exhausted last of their several appeals to dismiss the lawsuits when Pennsylvania Supreme Court refused to hear their case.

== Motives ==
Cullen stated that he had overdosed patients to spare them from going into cardiac or respiratory arrest and being listed as a Code Blue emergency. He told detectives that he could not bear to witness or even hear about attempts at saving a victim's life. Cullen also stated that he gave patients overdoses so that he could end their suffering and prevent hospital personnel from dehumanizing them. However, not all of his victims were terminal patients. Some, like Gall, had been expected to recover before Cullen killed them. The nurse Lynn Tester described many of the victims as "people on the mend" in a police interview.

Cullen told investigators that although he often observed patients' suffering for several days, the decision to commit each murder was performed on impulse. Cullen told detectives in December 2003 that he lived most of his life in a fog and that he had blacked out memories of murdering most of his victims. He said that he could not recall how many he killed or why he had chosen them. At times, Cullen adamantly denied committing any murders at a given facility. However, after reviewing medical records, he admitted that he had been involved in patient deaths.

== Legal impact ==
Cullen moved from facility to facility undetected mainly because of the lack of requirements to report suspicious behavior by medical workers and inadequate legal obligations on employers. New Jersey and Pennsylvania, like most other states, required health care facilities to report suspicious deaths only in the most egregious cases, and the penalties for failing to report incidents were minor. Also, many states did not give investigators the legal authority to discover workers' previous employers.

Employers feared investigating incidents or giving a bad employment reference for fear of such actions triggering lawsuits. According to detectives and Cullen himself, several hospitals suspected him of harming or killing patients but failed to take appropriate legal actions. After Cullen's criminal conviction, many of the hospitals at which he had worked were sued by the families of his victims. The files and settlements against the New Jersey hospitals, all of which were settled out of court, are sealed.

In some cases, individual workers took it upon themselves informally to try to prevent Cullen from being hired or to have him terminated. Some contacted nearby hospitals in secret or quietly spoke to their superiors to alert them not to hire Cullen. When Cullen took a job at Sacred Heart Hospital, in Allentown, in June 2001, a nurse who had heard rumors about him at Easton Hospital advised her coworkers. The nurses threatened to quit en masse if Cullen was not immediately dismissed, which he was.

Prompted by the Cullen case, Pennsylvania, New Jersey, and 35 other states adopted new laws which encourage employers to give honest appraisals of workers' job performance and provide legal protections for reporting medical errors. The New Jersey laws, in particular, formed the model other states would follow. Firstly, the 2004 Patient Safety Act increased hospitals' responsibility for reporting "serious preventable adverse events". The 2005 Enhancement Act, a supplement to the Patient Safety Act, required hospitals to report certain details on their employees to the New Jersey Division of Consumer Affairs and mandated that complaints and disciplinary records relating to patient care be kept for at least seven years.

== In popular culture ==
The 2008 direct-to-video film Killer Nurse, written and directed by Ulli Lommel, was loosely based on Cullen.

The CBS newsmagazine show 60 Minutes featured an interview with Cullen conducted by correspondent Steve Kroft, in an episode titled "Angel of Death" that originally aired on April 28, 2013. It was the first time Cullen had spoken publicly of his crimes or of his motives for committing them.

On June 25, 2020, the British television channel Sky Crime aired the documentary Charles Cullen – Killing for Kindness, produced by Woodcut Mediastory.

The film The Good Nurse, adapted from Charles Graeber's non-fiction book The Good Nurse: A True Story of Medicine, Madness, and Murder, was released on Netflix on October 26, 2022. Eddie Redmayne portrays Cullen and Jessica Chastain portrays coworker Amy Loughren, a nurse who helped implicate Cullen and assisted detectives by talking with Cullen after work hours while she wore a wire.

Capturing the Killer Nurse is a 2022 documentary film about Cullen. It includes interviews with Cullen, his co-workers, detectives and Amy Loughren, a nurse who assisted the detectives. There are interviews with family members of the victims, true crime author Charles Graeber and audio from Cullen himself. It began streaming on Netflix in November 2022.

A 2023 episode of the podcast Criminal is an interview with Amy Loughren and covers the story.

== See also ==
- Niels Hogel
- Donald Harvey
- Lucy Letby
- Orville Majors
- Reta Mays
- Harold Shipman
- Arnfinn Nesset
- Roger Andermatt
- Elizabeth Wettlaufer
- Malmö Östra hospital murders
- List of serial killers in the United States
- List of serial killers by number of victims
- Serial killers with health-related professions
