= Leonie Benesch =

German actress (born 1991)

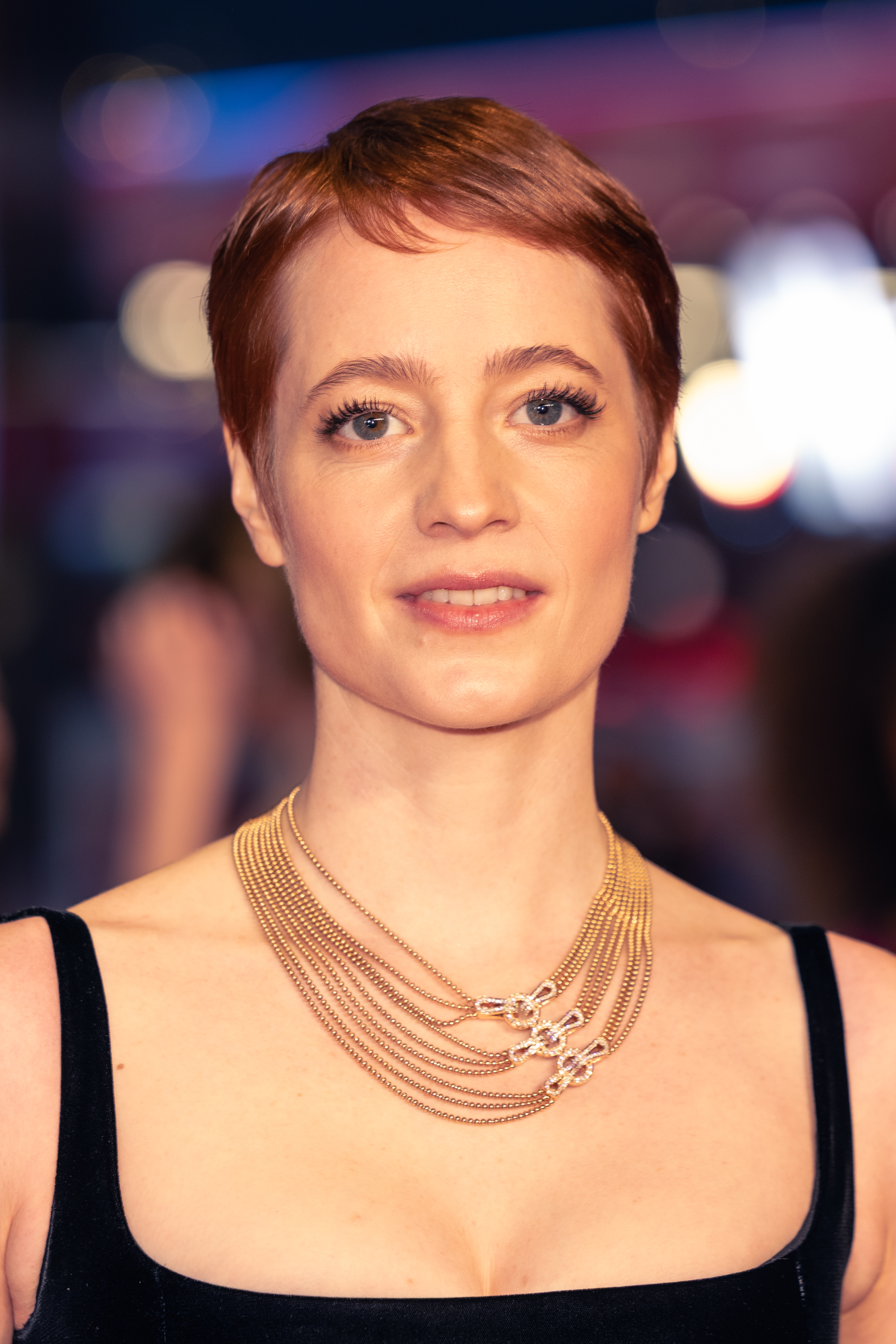
- Benesch at the 75th Berlin International Film Festival in 2025
- Born: 22 April 1991 (age 35); Hamburg, Germany
- Education: Guildhall School of Music and Drama
- Occupation: Actress

Leonie Benesch (German: [ˈleːoni ˈbɛnɛʃ]; born 22 April 1991) is a German actress. She has played roles in various film and TV productions including Babylon Berlin, The Crown, Around the World in 80 Days and The Teachers' Lounge. For her role in the latter, in 2023, she received the award for Best Performance in a Leading Role at the German Film Awards.

== Career ==
In 2009, Benesch played the role of Eva in the film The White Ribbon, which won the Golden Palm. Film critics singled out her performance as "a discovery". She received the American "Young Artist Award" for her work, as well as a "New Faces Award". In 2010, she performed in Philip Koch's drama Picco and in Sophie Heldman's film Colors in the Dark (Satte Farben vor Schwarz), where she worked alongside Senta Berger and Bruno Ganz.

In 2017, Benesch performed in Babylon Berlin as Greta Overbeck, winning the "German Acting Prize". Benesch also performed in The Crown as the sister of Prince Philip, Princess Cecilie of Greece and Denmark. In 2020, she was cast in the BBC miniseries Around the World in 80 Days, alongside David Tennant as Phileas Fogg and Ibrahim Koma as Passepartout.

In 2023, she won the German Film Award for her leading role as an idealistic teacher (Carla Nowak) in the German drama The Teachers’ Lounge, cowritten and directed by İlker Çatak, in the category Best Female Leading Role. She was also nominated for the European Film Award, while a year later, the film received an Oscar nomination for Best International Film. Commenting on the success of the film in an interview, Benesch told GoldDerby, "the film was finished for nine months and nobody wanted to buy it. All the distributors said they didn’t see any international potential. It’s too small, it’s too much text, it’s too German. When we had our premiere in Ireland there was a buzz and we got sold out across the globe. It was a complete surprise!"

== Personal life ==
Benesch grew up in Tübingen as the oldest of four children, and attended the Freie Waldorfschule and the Rudolf-Steiner-Schule in Bielefeld-Schildesche. She also attended the Guildhall School of Music and Drama in London.

== Filmography ==
=== Film ===
Year	Film	Role	Notes
2007	Beautiful Bitch	Gitti	
2009	The White Ribbon	Eva	
2010	Picco	Kevin's Girlfriend	
2010	Colors in the Dark	Yvonne	
2011	Was uns zusteht	Kerstin	Short
2012	Morgenröte	Lynn	Short
2013	Brüderlein	Teresa	
2013	George	Margot Hanke	TV film
2013	Das Jerusalem-Syndrom	Maria Gärtner	TV film
2014	High Tide Is Dead on Time	Mia Halbach	TV film
2014	Die Frauen der Wikinger - Odins Töchter	Jova	TV film
2015	8 Seconds	Helen	
2019	Brecht	Elisabeth Hauptmann	
2020	Phoenix	Jenny	Short
2020	Persian Lessons	Elsa	
2020	Der Überläufer	Hildegard Roth	
2023	The Teachers' Lounge	Carla Nowak	
2024	September 5	Marianne	
2025	Late Shift (Heldin)	Floria	A Switzerland, Germany co-production film selected at the Berlinale in Special Gala. It will have its World premiere in February.

=== Television ===
Year	Title	Role	Notes
2012	Cologne P.D.	Nadia Winkowski	Episode: "Zeugin in Angst"
2012	Der Kriminalist	Clarissa von Tannenhof	Episode: "Blaues Blut"
2013	Tatort	Julia	Episode: "Freunde bis in den Tod"
2017	Howards End	Frieda Mosenbach	1 episode
2017, 2019	The Crown	Princess Cecilie	3 episodes
2017–2020	Babylon Berlin	Greta Overbeck	Series regular
2018	Counterpart	Sofia	2 episodes
2018	Morden im Norden	Gaby Zinke	Episode: "Jäger und Sammler"
2019	Holiday Secrets	Lara	Series regular
2019	The Master Butcher	Eva	Series regular
2020	Spy City	Eliza Hahn	Series regular
2021	Around the World in 80 Days	Abigail "Fix" Fortescue	Main role
2023	The Swarm	Charlie Wagner	Main role
2024	Vienna Blood	Helena Rieger	2 episodes
2026	Prisoner	Nina Dragus	6 episodes

== Awards and nominations ==
Year	Award	Category	Work	Result	Ref.
2010	Young Artist Awards	Best Performance in an International Feature Film - Leading Young Performer (with Leonard Proxauf)	The White Ribbon	Won	
2010	New Faces Awards	Best Actress	The White Ribbon	Won	
2014	Günter Strack TV Awards	Best Young Actress	Tatort - Episode:Freunde bis in den Tod	Nominated	
2018	German Screen Actors Awards	Best Supporting Actress	Babylon Berlin	Won	
2023	Shooting Stars Awards	EFP Shooting Star - Actresses	—N/a	Won	
2023	European Film Awards	Best Actress	The Teachers' Lounge	Nominated	
2023	German Film Awards	Best Performance by an Actress in a Leading Role	The Teachers' Lounge	Won	
2026	European Film Awards	Best Actress	Late Shift	Nominated	
