= Robert Wood Johnson University Hospital Somerset =

Hospital in Somerville, New Jersey, US

RWJUH Somerset
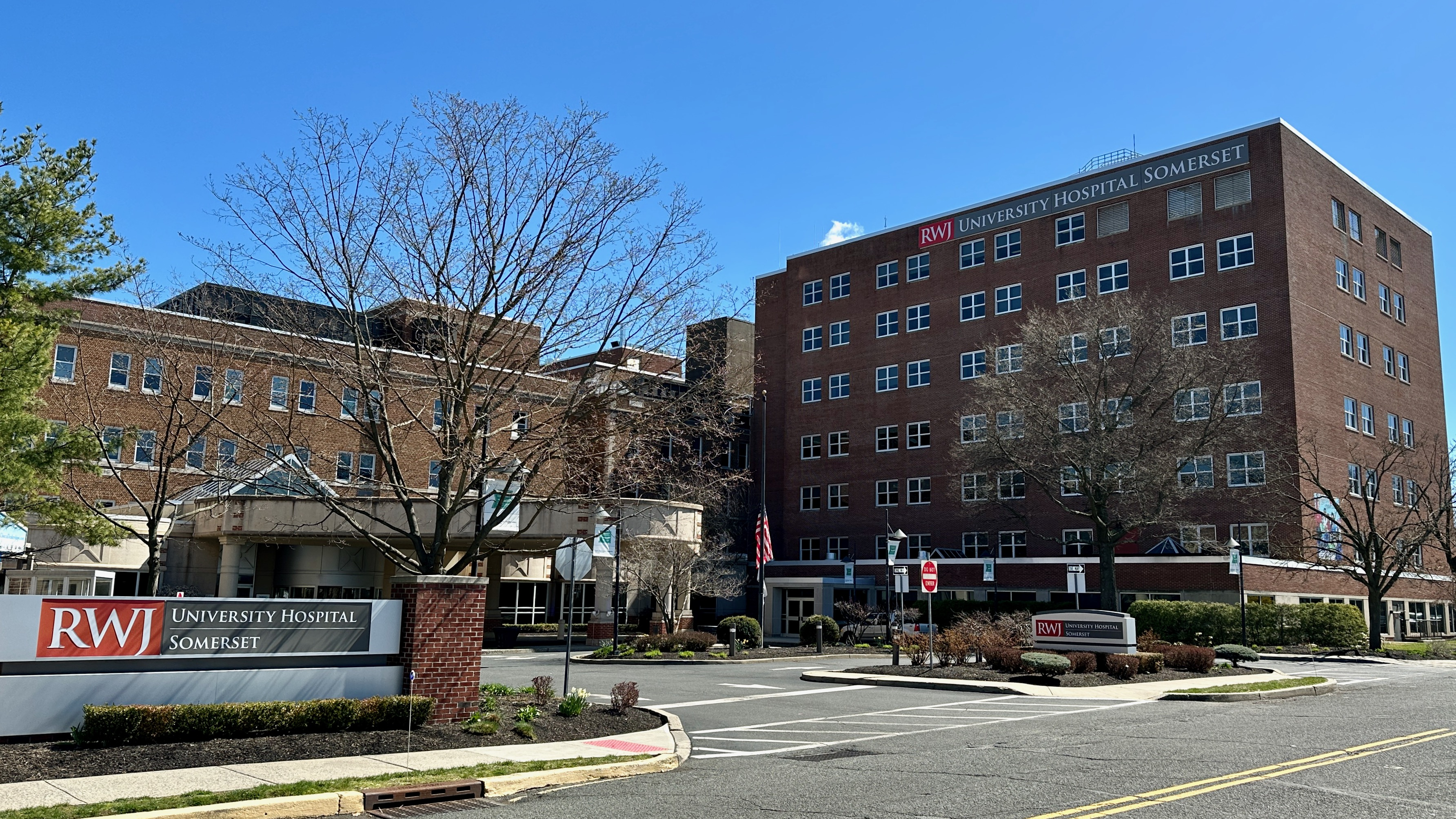
- RWJ University Hospital Somerset

Geography
- Location: Somerville, New Jersey, United States
- Coordinates: 40.5681°N 74.5950°W

Organization
- Funding: Non-profit hospital
- Type: Regional hospital
- Affiliated university: Robert Wood Johnson Medical School

Services
- Standards: American Hospital Association, Joint Commission
- Emergency department: Level III trauma center
- Beds: 355

History
- Opened: 1901

Links
- Website: www.rwjbh.org/rwj-university-hospital-somerset/
- Lists: Hospitals in New Jersey

Robert Wood Johnson University Hospital Somerset, located in Somerville, New Jersey, is a nationally accredited, 355-bed regional medical center providing a variety of comprehensive emergency, medical/surgical and rehabilitative services to Central New Jersey residents.

RWJUH-Somerset is a major clinical affiliate of the Rutgers-Robert Wood Johnson Medical School (RWJMS). The medical center operates a family medicine residency program and hosts residents from RWJMS specializing in obstetrics/gynecology, psychiatry and other specialties. Somerset Medical center's 650-member medical and dental staff represents all major medical and surgical specialties and has one of the highest percentages of board-certified doctors in New Jersey. The medical center ranks in the top 20 percent of hospitals in New Jersey in the number of cardiac procedures performed.

The medical center is fully accredited by the Joint Commission and is a member of the American Hospital Association, New Jersey Hospital Association and the New Jersey Council of Teaching Hospitals. It is a clinical research affiliate of The Cancer Institute of New Jersey. The medical center is licensed by the New Jersey Department of Health and Senior Services. Somerset Medical Center recently completed the largest facility expansion project in its history, which includes a new emergency department, new inpatient oncology and surgical pavilions and expanded surgical suites.

The $25 million Steeplechase Cancer Center, which opened in January 2007, brings together all outpatient cancer services in one location in Somerset County for the first time. Since the 1950s, race proceeds of those attending the Far Hills Races have gone to fund the Steeplechase Cancer Center at Somerset Medical Center, raising more than $17 million through 2007.

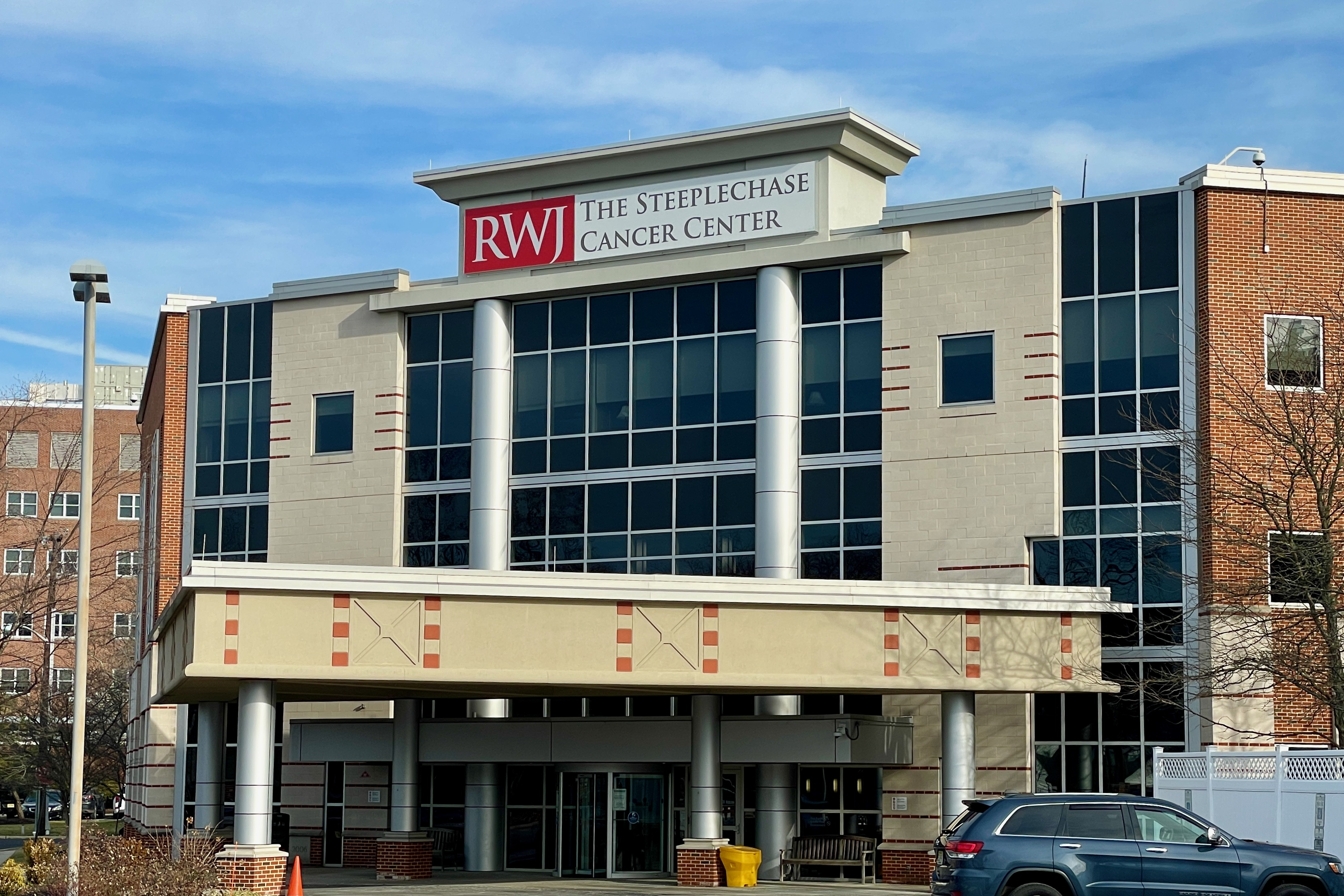
Steeplechase Cancer Center

== History ==
Somerset Hospital was founded at a house on Main Street in 1901 as a 12-bed facility with a staff of 10 doctors. This converted residential home remained the location of the hospital until 1925 when the current building was completed. Additional wings were added to the hospital in 1946 and 1963, and the hospital was renamed in 1978 to Somerset Medical Center. As June 1, 2014, Somerset Medical Center completed its merger with Robert Wood Johnson University Hospital in New Brunswick, NJ and was renamed to Robert Wood Johnson University Hospital Somerset as a campus in Somerville, NJ in Somerset County in New Jersey.

It was here that Charles Cullen, one of the most prolific serial killers in New Jersey history began to kill patients at Somerset Medical Center, after working at several area hospitals. In September 2002 Cullen began working for Somerset Medical Center in Somerville, New Jersey in the critical care unit. Around this time Cullen began dating a local woman, but his depression worsened. He killed at least eight patients and attempted to kill at least one more by June 2003. As usual, his drugs of choice were digoxin, epinephrine, and insulin.

On June 18, 2003, Cullen attempted to murder Philip Gregor, a patient at Somerset Medical Center. Gregor survived and was discharged, but he died six months later of natural causes. Soon afterward, Somerset Medical Center began to observe clues indicating Cullen's wrongdoing. The hospital's computer system showed that Cullen was accessing the records of patients to whom he was not assigned, co-workers began seeing him in the rooms of patients' to whom he was not assigned, and the hospital's computerized drug-dispensing cabinets showed that Cullen was requesting medications that his patients had not been prescribed. Cullen's drug requests were strange, with many orders that were immediately canceled, and many repetitive requests within minutes of each other.

In July 2003 the executive director of the New Jersey Poison Information and Education System warned Somerset Medical Center officials that at least four suspicious overdoses indicated the possibility that an employee was killing patients. The hospital contacted authorities October 2003. By then, Cullen had killed at least another five patients and attempted to kill a sixth.

When a patient in Somerset died of low blood sugar in October 2003, the medical center alerted state authorities. That patient was Cullen's final victim. State officials castigated the hospital for failing to report a nonfatal insulin overdose, administered by Cullen in August. An investigation into Cullen's employment history revealed past suspicions about his involvement with prior deaths. Somerset Medical Center fired Cullen on October 31, 2003, ostensibly for lying on his job application. Police kept him under surveillance for several weeks, until they had finished their investigation.
