= List of Croatian European Film Award winners and nominees =

This is a list of Croatian European Film Award winners and nominees. This list details the performances of Croatian actors, actresses, and films that have either been submitted or nominated for, or have won, a European Film Award including Croatian co-productions.

== Main categories ==
| Year | Award | Recipient | Status | Note |
|---|---|---|---|---|
| 2004 | European Discovery | A Wonderful Night in Split | Nominated | |
| 2005 | Best Film | Grbavica: Esma's Secret | Nominated | Bosnian-Austrian-German-Croatian co-production |
| 2010 | Best Actress | Zrinka Cvitešić for On the Path | Nominated | Bosnian-Austrian-German-Croatian co-production |
| 2013 | Best Comedy | The Priest's Children | Nominated | Croatian-Montenegrin-Serbian co-production |
| 2014 | Best Short Film | The Chicken | Won | German-Croatian co-production |
| 2015 | Best Short Film | The Picnic | Won | |
| 2016 | People's Choice Award for Best Film | The High Sun | Nominated | Croatian-Slovenian-Serbian co-production |

== See also ==
- List of Croatian submissions for the Academy Award for Best Foreign Language Film
