= Boris Dežulović =

Croatian journalist, writer and columnist

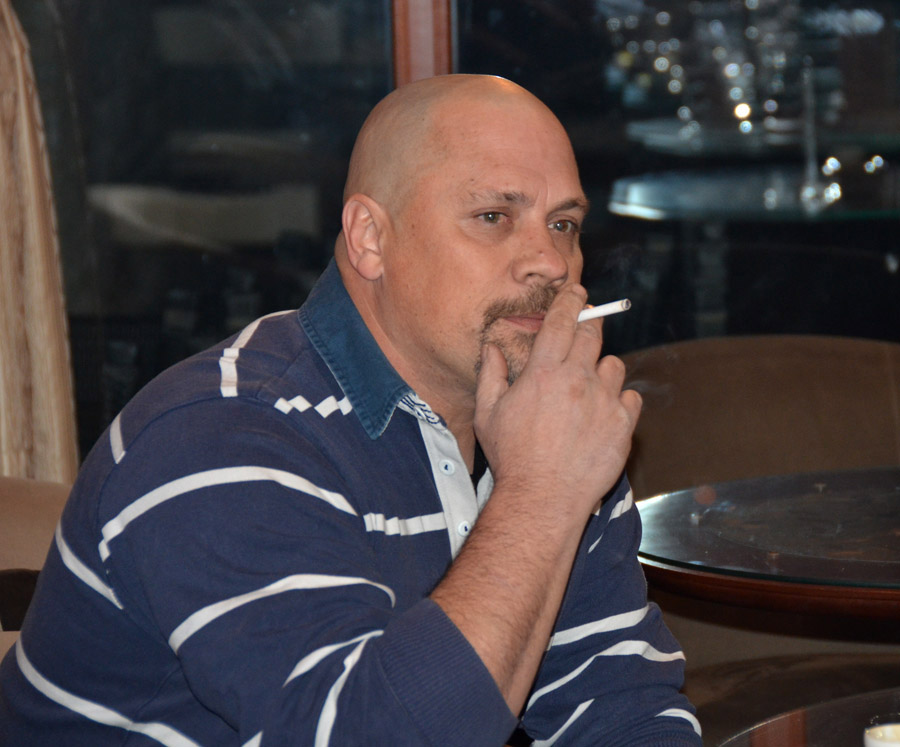
- Born: 20 November 1964 (age 61); Split, SR Croatia, Yugoslavia
- Occupations: Journalist and novelist
- Partner: Rose Fistanić
- Children: Dora Dežulović
- Writing career
- Period: 1984–present

Boris Dežulović (born 20 November 1964) is a Croatian journalist, writer and columnist, best known as one of the founders of the now defunct satirical magazine Feral Tribune.

== Biography ==
Dežulović studied art history at the University of Split. He began his career by writing for the Croatian newspaper Slobodna Dalmacija.

Along with Viktor Ivančić and Predrag Lucić, he was one of the three original members of the "VIVA LUDEŽ" trio of Split-based humorists who first began writing in 1984 and eventually established the Feral Tribune magazine in 1993.

In 1999, Dežulović left Feral Tribune and joined the popular current affairs weekly Globus where he was one of their columnists.

Dežulović is also a writer. In 2003, he published Christkind, a science fiction novel about time travel which explores ethical dilemmas surrounding the possibility of killing baby Hitler. His second novel was published in 2005, titled Jebo sad hiljadu dinara (lit. Who gives a fuck about a thousand dinars now), a satirical novel about the war in Bosnia, and a book of poetry titled Pjesme iz Lore (Poems from Lora). The latter was also published in German in 2008, titled Gedichte aus Lora.

Dežulović won the 2013 European Press Prize in the Commentator category. In 2015, Slobodna Dalmacija terminated their contract with Dežulović following a court decision which ordered the newspaper to pay total of 150,000 HRK in damages for an editorial written by Dežulović. In 2017, he signed the Declaration on the Common Language of the Croats, Serbs, Bosniaks and Montenegrins. He currently publishes weekly columns for N1 and Portal Novosti.

Dežulović's 2014 article about Tomislav Buzov served as an inspiration for Nebojša Slijepčević to make his short film The Man Who Could Not Remain Silent (2024). The film won the Short Film Palme d'Or at the 2024 Cannes Film Festival, the European Short Film at the 37th European Film Awards, and was nominated for Best Live Action Short Film at the 97th Academy Awards.

== See also ==
- Petar Luković
- Viktor Ivančić
