= European Film Award for Best Short Film =

Film award category

- Country: Europe
- Presented by: European Film Academy
- First award: 1998
- Currently held by: My Uncle Tudor (2021)
- Website: europeanfilmawards.eu

European Film Award for Best Short Film has been awarded annually since 1998 by the European Film Academy.

== Winners and nominees ==
=== 1990s ===
Year	English title	Original title	Director(s)	Production country
1998 (11th)
1998 (11th)	Un Jour		Marie Paccou	France
1999 (12th)
1999 (12th)	Welcome to San Salvario	Ben Venuto in San Salvario	Enrico Verra	Italy
1999 (12th)	The Difference	La Différence	Rita Küng	Switzerland
1999 (12th)	Senhoer Jeronimo		Inès de Medeiros	Portugal
1999 (12th)	Vacancy		Matthias Müller	Germany
1999 (12th)	Wanted		Milla Moilanen	Finland

=== 2000s ===
Year	English title	Original title	Director(s)	Production country
2000 (13th)
2000 (13th)	Our stork	A mi gólyánk	Lívia Gyarmathy	Hungary
2000 (13th)	The Zone	De Zone	Ben van Lieshout	Netherlands
2000 (13th)	And I Will Not Leave You Until I Die	I Nie Opuszczę Cię aż do śmierci	Maciej Adamek	Poland
2000 (13th)	A Stone Left Unturned	Kovat miehet	Maarit Lalli	Finland
2000 (13th)	Ferment		Tim MacMillan	United Kingdom
2001 (14th)
2001 (14th)	Je t'aime John Wayne		Toby MacDonald	United Kingdom
2001 (14th)	Sweden 200	Svitjod 200	Mårten Nilsson, David Flamholc	Sweden
2001 (14th)	The Heist	Kuppet	Frederik Meldal, Dennis Petersen	Denmark
2001 (14th)	The Basics	Lo Básico	José García Hérnandez	Spain
2001 (14th)	Peau de Vache		Gérald Hustache-Mathieu	France
2001 (14th)	I See A Boat in Sail	Å se en båt med seil	Anja Breien	Norway
2001 (14th)	Better or Worse?		Jocelyn Cammack	United Kingdom
2001 (14th)	Copy Shop		Virgil Widrich	Austria
2001 (14th)	A Man Thing	Męska sprawa	Sławomir Fabicki	Poland
2001 (14th)	The Whiz Kids	Freunde	Jan Krüger	Germany
2001 (14th)	In Between	Corpo e meio	Sandro Aguilar	Portugal
2002 (15th)
2002 (15th)	10 Minutes	10 Minuta	Ahmed Imamović	Bosnia and Herzegovina
2002 (15th)	Muno		Bouli Lanners	Belgium
2002 (15th)	News from L Project	Nouvelle de la Tour L	Samuel Benchetrit	France
2002 (15th)	Part-Times	Mi-Temps	Mathias Gokalp	France
2002 (15th)	That Old Dream That Moves	Ce vieux rêve qui bouge	Alain Guiraudie	France
2002 (15th)	Relativity		Virginia Heath	United Kingdom
2002 (15th)	Wedding Night	Nuit de Noces	Olga Baillif	Belgium, France
2002 (15th)	Brother of Mine	Bror Min	Jens Jonsson	Sweden
2002 (15th)	The Reflector	Kuvastin	Tatu Pohjavirta	Finland
2002 (15th)	Procter		Joachim Trier	Norway, United Kingdom
2002 (15th)	Lover of Pirates	Kalózok Szeretője	Zsófia Péterffy	Hungary
2003 (16th)
2003 (16th)	(A Torsion)	(A) Torzija	Stefan Arsenijević	Serbia, Slovenia
2003 (16th)	La Chanson-Chanson		Xavier Diskeuve	Belgium
2003 (16th)	Mamaman		Iao Lethem	Belgium
2003 (16th)	At Dawning		Martin Jones	United Kingdom
2003 (16th)	Save the Children	Redd Barna	Terje Rangnes	Norway
2003 (16th)	An Embrace	Une Étreinte	Eskil Vogt	Norway
2003 (16th)	Your Native Country	Kraj Urodzenia	Jacek Bławut	Poland
2003 (16th)	We Are Living on the Edge	My Zhivem Na Krai	Victor Asliuk	Belarus
2003 (16th)	The Wallet	Le Portefeuille	Vincent Bierrewaerts	France, Belgium
2003 (16th)	Small Avalanches	Små Skred	Birgitte Staermose	Denmark
2003 (16th)	The Trumouse Show		Julio Robledo	Spain
2003 (16th)	The Giant	Velikan	Alexander Kott	Russia
2004 (17th)
2004 (17th)	I'll Wait for the Next One	J'attendrai le suivant	Philippe Orreindy	France
2004 (17th)	"C" Block Story	Poveste La Scara "C"	Cristian Nemescu	Romania
2004 (17th)	Cigarettes and Coffee	Un Cartus De Kent Si Un Pachet De Cafea	Cristi Puiu	Romania
2004 (17th)	Other People's Kisses	Les Baisers des Autres	Carine Tardieu	France
2004 (17th)	Fender Bender		Daniel Elliott	Estonia
2004 (17th)	All in All	Alt I Alt	Torbjørn Skårild	Norway
2004 (17th)	The Card Thieves	Panique Au Village: Les Voleurs Des Cartes	Vincent Patar, Stéphane Aubier	Belgium, France
2004 (17th)	Love Me or Leave Me Alone		Duane Hopkins	United Kingdom
2004 (17th)	Me, Myself and the Universe	Ich Und Das Universum	Hajo Schomerus	Germany
2004 (17th)	Goodbye		Steve Hudson	Germany
2004 (17th)	Cleopatra's Nose	La Nariz de Cleopatra	Richard Jordan	Spain
2004 (17th)	At 7:35 in the Morning	7:35 de la Mañana	Nacho Vigalondo	Spain
2005 (18th)
2005 (18th)	Undressing My Mother		Ken Wardrop	Ireland
2005 (18th)	Little Terrorist		Ashvin Kumar	United Kingdom
2005 (18th)	Rendezvous	Rendevú	Ferenc Cakó	Hungary
2005 (18th)	Rain is Falling		Holger Ernst	Germany
2005 (18th)	Flatlife		Jonas Geirnaert	Belgium
2005 (18th)	Hi Maya	Hoi Maya	Claudia Lorenz	Switzerland
2005 (18th)	Dust	Toz	Halit Fatih Kizilgok	Turkey
2005 (18th)	Bawke		Hisham Zaman	Norway
2005 (18th)	The Serpent	A Serpente	Sandro Aguilar	Portugal
2005 (18th)	Autobiography Scene Number 6882	Scen Nr. 6882 Ur Mitt Liv	Ruben Östlund	Sweden
2005 (18th)	Paycheck	Prva Plata	Alen Drljević	Bosnia and Herzegovina
2005 (18th)	Butterflies		Max Jacoby	Luxembourg
2005 (18th)	Minotauromaquia, Pablo in the Labyrinth	Minotauromaquia, Pablo en el Laberinto	Juan Pablo Etcheverry	Spain
2006 (19th)
2006 (19th)	Before Dawn		Bálint Kenyeres	Hungary
2006 (19th)	Delivery		Till Nowak	Germany
2006 (19th)	Vincent		Giulio Ricciarelli	Italy
2006 (19th)	Zakaria		Gianluca De Serio, Massimiliano De Serio	Italy
2006 (19th)	Pistache		Valérie Pirson	France
2006 (19th)	For Intérieur		Patrick Poubel	France
2006 (19th)	By the Kiss		Yann Gonzalez	France
2006 (19th)	It's in the Air...	Comme un Air...	Yohann Gloaguen	France
2006 (19th)	Meander		Joke Liberge	Belgium
2006 (19th)	The Fence	El Cerco	Ricardo Íscar, Nacho Martín	Spain
2006 (19th)	Sniffer		Bobbie Peers	Norway
2006 (19th)	Good Luck Nedim	Sretan Put Nedime	Marko Šantić	Slovenia
2006 (19th)	The Making of the Parts		Daniel Elliott	United Kingdom
2006 (19th)	Never Like the First Time	Aldrig Som Första Gången	Jonas Odell	Sweden
2007 (20th)
2007 (20th)	Alumbramiento	Lightborne	Eduardo Chapero-Jackson	Spain
2007 (20th)	Adjustment		Ian Mackinnon	United Kingdom
2007 (20th)	Dad		Daniel Mulloy	United Kingdom
2007 (20th)	Dreams and Desires - Family Ties		Joanna Quinn	United Kingdom
2007 (20th)	Rotten Apple		Ralitza Petrova	United Kingdom
2007 (20th)	Tokyo Jim		Simon Ellis	United Kingdom
2007 (20th)	Soft		Jamie Rafn	United Kingdom
2007 (20th)	Amin		David Dusa	France
2007 (20th)	Le Dîner		Cécile Vernant	France
2007 (20th)	Kwiz		Renaud Callebaut	Portugal
2007 (20th)	Plot Point		Nicolas Provost	Belgium
2007 (20th)	Salvador		Abdelatif Hwidar	Switzerland
2007 (20th)	Tommy		Ole Giæver	Norway
2008 (21st)
2008 (21st)	Frankie		Darren Thornton	Ireland
2008 (21st)	Contact	Raak	Hanro Smitsman	Netherlands
2008 (21st)	The Apology Line		James Lees	United Kingdom
2008 (21st)	Procrastination		Johnny Kelly	United Kingdom
2008 (21st)	Joy		Joe Lawlor, Christine Molloy	United Kingdom
2008 (21st)	The Pearce Sisters		Luis Cook	United Kingdom
2008 (21st)	Time is Running Out		Marc Reisbig	United Kingdom
2008 (21st)	A Kiss for the World	Un Bisou pour le Monde	Cyril Paris	France
2008 (21st)	Fire	Uguns	Laila Pakalniņa	Latvia
2008 (21st)	2 Birds	Smáfuglar	Rúnar Rúnarsson	Iceland
2008 (21st)	Love You More		Sam Taylor-Johnson	United Kingdom, United States
2008 (21st)	Tolerance	Tolerantia	Ivan Ramadan	Bosnia and Herzegovina
2008 (21st)	The Altruists	De onbaatzuchtige	Koen Dejaegher	Belgium
2008 (21st)	With a Little Patience	Türelem	László Nemes	Hungary
2009 (22nd)
2009 (22nd)	Poste restante		Marcel Łoziński	Poland
2009 (22nd)	14		Asitha Ameresekere	United Kingdom
2009 (22nd)	Peter in Radioland		Johanna Wagner	United Kingdom
2009 (22nd)	Between Dreams		Iris Olsson	France, Russia, Finland
2009 (22nd)	Good Night		Valéry Rosier	Belgium, France
2009 (22nd)	Renovare		Paul Negoescu	Germany, Romania
2009 (22nd)	Swimming Lesson	Zwemles	Danny de Vent	Belgium
2009 (22nd)	Tile M for Murder	Lägg M för mord	Magnus Holmgren	Sweden
2009 (22nd)	Was bleibt		David Nawrath	Germany
2009 (22nd)	Sinner		Meni Philip	Germany
2009 (22nd)	The Suffering of Mr. Karpf - The Birthday	Die Leiden des Herrn Karpf - Der Geburtstag	Lola Randl	Germany
2009 (22nd)	The Glass Trap		Pawel Ferdek	Poland

=== 2010s ===
Year	English title	Original title	Director(s)	Production country
2010 (23rd)
2010 (23rd)	Hanoi - Warsaw	Hanoi - Warszawa	Katarzyna Klimkiewicz	Poland
2010 (23rd)	Amor		Thomas Wangsmo	Norway
2010 (23rd)	Lights	Ampelmann	Giulio Ricciarelli	Germany
2010 (23rd)	The External World		David OReilly	Germany
2010 (23rd)	Joseph's Snails	Les escargots de Joseph	Sophie Roze	France
2010 (23rd)	Rendezvous in Stella-Plage	Rendez-vous à Stella-Plage	Shalimar Preuss	France
2010 (23rd)	Blijf bij me, weg	Stay, Away	Paloma Aguilera Valdebenito	Netherlands
2010 (23rd)	Out of Love	Ønskebørn	Birgitte Stærmose	Denmark
2010 (23rd)	Venus VS Me		Nathalie Teirlinck	Belgium
2010 (23rd)	The Little Snow Animal	Lumikko	Miia Tervo	Finland
2010 (23rd)	Tussilago		Jonas Odell	Sweden
2010 (23rd)	Maria's Way		Anne Milne	United Kingdom, Spain
2010 (23rd)	Talleres Clandestinos		Catalina Molina	Austria, Argentina
2010 (23rd)	Diarchy	Diarchia	Ferdinando Cito Filomarino	Italy, France
2010 (23rd)	Here I Am	Itt vagyok	Bálint Szimler	Hungary
2011 (24th)
2011 (24th)	The Wholly Family		Terry Gilliam	Italy
2011 (24th)	Berik		Daniel Joseph Borgman	Denmark
2011 (24th)	Little Children, Big Words	Små barn, stora ord	Lisa James-Larsson	Sweden
2011 (24th)	Incident by a Bank	Händelse vid bank	Ruben Östlund	Sweden
2011 (24th)	The Unliving	Återfödelsen	Hugo Lilja	Sweden
2011 (24th)	Derby		Paul Negoescu	Romania
2011 (24th)	Jessi		Mariejosephin Schneider	Germany
2011 (24th)	The Wolves	I lupi	Alberto de Michele	Italy, Netherlands
2011 (24th)	Silent River	Apele tac	Anca Miruna Lăzărescu	Germany, Romania
2011 (24th)	Paparazzi		Piotr Bernaś	Poland
2011 (24th)	Frozen Stories	Opowieści z chłodni	Grzegorz Jaroszuk	Poland
2011 (24th)	The Great Race	La gran carrera	Kote Camacho	Spain
2011 (24th)	Dimanches		Valéry Rosier	Belgium
2011 (24th)	Out	Tse	Roee Rosen	Israel
2011 (24th)	Hypercrisis		Josef Dabernig	Austria
2012 (25th)
2012 (25th)	Superman, Spiderman or Batman		Tudor Giurgiu	Romania
2012 (25th)	The Back of Beyond		Michael Lennox	United Kingdom
2012 (25th)	Beast	Csicska	Attila Till	Hungary
2012 (25th)	How to Pick Berries	Miten Marjoja Poimitaan	Elina Talvensaari	Finland
2012 (25th)	In the Open	Im Freien	Albert Sackl	Austria
2012 (25th)	Morning of Saint Anthony's Day	Manhã de Santo António	João Pedro Rodrigues	Portugal
2012 (25th)	Objection VI	Einspruch VI	Rolando Colla	Switzerland
2012 (25th)	The Ambassador and Me	L'Ambassadeur et Moi	Jan Czarlewski	Switzerland
2012 (25th)	Tomorrow Will Be Good	Demain, ça sera bien	Pauline Gay	France
2012 (25th)	Two Ships	Vilaine fille mauvais garçon	Justine Triet	France
2012 (25th)	Out of Frame	Titloi telous	Yorgos Zois	Greece
2012 (25th)	Silent	Sessiz - Be Deng	L. Rezan Yeşilbaş	Turkey
2012 (25th)	Two Hearts		Darren Thornton	Ireland
2012 (25th)	Villa Antropoff		Kaspar Jancis, Vladimir Leschiov	Latvia
2013 (26th)
2013 (26th)	Death of a Shadow	Dood van een Schaduw	Tom Van Avermaet	Belgium, France
2013 (26th)	A Story For The Modlins		Sergio Oksman	Spain
2013 (26th)	Mystery	Misterio	Chema García Ibarra	Spain
2013 (26th)	Butter Lamp	La Lampe au Beurre de Yak	Hu Wei	France, China
2013 (26th)	Cut		Christoph Girardet, Matthias Müller	Germany
2013 (26th)	Sunday 3	Sonntag 3	Jochen Kuhn	Germany
2013 (26th)	Houses with Small Windows		Bülent Öztürk	Belgium
2013 (26th)	Jump	Skok	Petar Valchanov, Kristina Grozeva	Bulgaria
2013 (26th)	Letter		Sergei Loznitsa	Russia
2013 (26th)	Zima		Cristina Picchi	Russia
2013 (26th)	Wasted		Sarah Woolner, Cathy Brady	Ireland, United Kingdom
2013 (26th)	Nuclear Waste	Yaderni Wydhody	Myroslav Slaboshpytskiy	Ukraine
2013 (26th)	Orbit Ever After		Jamie Stone	United Kingdom
2013 (26th)	The Waves	As Ondas	Miguel Fonseca	Portugal
2013 (26th)	Though I Know the River is Dry		Omar Robert Hamilton	Egypt, Palestine, United Kingdom
2014 (27th)
2014 (27th)	The Chicken		Una Gunjak	Germany, Croatia
2014 (27th)	Emergency Calls	Hätäkutsu	Hannes Vartiainen, Pekka Veikkolainen	Finland
2014 (27th)	Shipwreck		Morgan Knibbe	Netherlands
2014 (27th)	A Town Called Panic: The Christmas Log	Panique au Village: La Bûche de Noël	Vincent Patar, Stéphane Aubier	Belgium, France
2014 (27th)	Dinola	დინოლა	Mariam Khatchvani	Georgia
2014 (27th)	Summer 2014	Lato 2014	Wojciech Sobczyk	Poland
2014 (27th)	Wall	Fal	Simon Szabó	Hungary
2014 (27th)	Taprobana		Gabriel Abrantes	Portugal, Sri Lanka, Denmark
2014 (27th)	Pride		Pavel Vesnakov	Bulgaria, Germany
2014 (27th)	The Chimera of M.		Sebastian Buerkner	United Kingdom
2014 (27th)	Little Block of Cement with Disheveled Hair Containing the Sea	Pequeño bloque de cemento con pelo alborotado conteniendo el mar	Jorge Lopez Navarette	Spain
2014 (27th)	The Missing Scarf		Eoin Duffy	Ireland
2014 (27th)	Whale Valley	Hvalfjörður	Guðmundur Arnar Guðmundsson	Denmark, Iceland
2014 (27th)	Daily Bread	פת לחם	Idan Hubel	Israel
2014 (27th)	Still Got Lives	Ich hab noch Auferstehung	Jan-Gerrit Seyler	Germany
2015 (28th)
2015 (28th)	Picnic	Piknik	Jure Pavlović	Croatia
2015 (28th)	E.T.E.R.N.I.T.		Giovanni Aloi	France
2015 (28th)	Son of the Wolf	Fils du loup	Lola Quivoron	France
2015 (28th)	Field Study		Eva Weber	United Kingdom
2015 (28th)	Over		Jörn Threlfall	United Kingdom
2015 (28th)	Kung Fury		David Sandberg	Sweden
2015 (28th)	Dissonance		Till Nowak	Germany
2015 (28th)	Symbolic Threats		Mischa Leinkauf, Lutz Henke & Matthias Wermke	Germany
2015 (28th)	Listen	Kuuntele	Hamy Ramezan & Rungano Nyoni	Denmark, Finland
2015 (28th)	Our Body	Naše telo	Dane Komljen	Serbia, Bosnia & Herzegovina
2015 (28th)	Smile, and the World Will Smile Back	Im tekhayekh, ha'Olam yekhayekh elekha	Yoav Gross, Ehab Tarabieh & the al-Haddad family	Israel, Palestine
2015 (28th)	The Runner	El corredor	José Luis Montesinos	Spain
2015 (28th)	The Translator	Çevirmen	Emre Kayiş	United Kingdom, Turkey
2015 (28th)	This Place We Call Our Home		Thora Lorentzen & Sybilla Tuxen	Denmark
2015 (28th)	Washingtonia		Konstantina Kotzamani	Greece
2016 (29th)
2016 (29th)	9 days: From My Window in Aleppo		Thomas Vroege, Floor van der Meulen, Issa Touma	Netherlands, Syria
2016 (29th)	The Wall	Le mur	Samuel Lampaert	Belgium
2016 (29th)	Edmond		Nina Gantz	United Kingdom
2016 (29th)	The Goodbye	El adiós	Clara Roquet	Spain, United States
2016 (29th)	90 Degrees North	90 Grad Nord	Detsky Graffam	Germany
2016 (29th)	In the Distance		Florian Grolig	Germany
2016 (29th)	We All Love the Seashore	Tout le monde aime le bord de la mer	Keina Espiñeira	Spain
2016 (29th)	A Man Returned		Mahdi Fleifel	United Kingdom, Denmark, Netherlands, Lebanon
2016 (29th)	Small Talk		Even Hafnor, Lisa Brooke Hansen	Norway
2016 (29th)	I'm Not From Here	Yo no soy de aquí	Maite Alberdi, Giedrė Žickytė	Chile, Denmark, Lithuania
2016 (29th)	Home		Daniel Mulloy	Kosovo, United Kingdom, Albania
2016 (29th)	The Fullness of Time (Romance)	L'immense retour	Manon Coubia	France, Belgium
2016 (29th)	Limbo		Konstantina Kotzamani	Greece, France
2016 (29th)	Amalimbo		Juan Pablo Libossart	Sweden, Estonia
2016 (29th)	Shooting Star	Падаща звезда	Lyubo Yonchev	Bulgaria, Italy
2017 (30th)
2017 (30th)	Timecode		Juanjo Giménez	Spain
2017 (30th)	Coca-Loca		Christos Massalas	Greece
2017 (30th)	En la Boca		Matteo Gariglio	Switzerland, Argentina
2017 (30th)	Fight in a Swedish Beach!!		Simon Vahlne	Sweden
2017 (30th)	Information Skies		Daniel van der Velden, Vinca Kruk	Netherlands, South Korea
2017 (30th)	LOVE		Réka Bucsi	Hungary, France
2017 (30th)	The Artificial Humors	Os Humores Artificiais	Gabriel Abrantes	Portugal
2017 (30th)	The Circle	Hevêrk	Rûken Tekes	Turkey
2017 (30th)	The Disinherited	Los Desheredados	Laura Ferrés	Spain
2017 (30th)	The Party		Andrea Harkin	Ireland
2017 (30th)	Ugly		Nikita Diakur	Germany
2017 (30th)	Wannabe		Jannis Lenz	Austria
2017 (30th)	Written/Unwritter	Scris/Nescris	Adrian Silisteanu	Romania
2017 (30th)	You Will Be Fine	Gros Chagrin	Céline Devaux	France
2017 (30th)	Young Men at Their Window	Jeunes hommes à fenêtre	Loukianos Moshonas	France
2018 (31st)
2018 (31st)	The Years	Gli Anni	Sara Fgaier	Italy, France
2018 (31st)	Aquaparque		Ana Moreira	Portugal
2018 (31st)	Burkina Brandenberg Komplex		Ulu Braun	Germany
2018 (31st)	Kontener		Sebastian Lang	Germany
2018 (31st)	Graduation '97	ВИПУСК '97	Pavlo Ostrikov	Ukraine
2018 (31st)	I Signed the Petition		Mahdi Fleifel	United Kingdom, Germany, Switzerland
2018 (31st)	Kapitalistis		Pablo Muñoz Gómez	Belgium, France
2018 (31st)	Meryem		Reber Dosky	Netherlands
2018 (31st)	Prisoner of Society	სოციუმის პატიმარი	Rati Tsiteladze	Georgia, Latvia
2018 (31st)	Release the Dogs	Lâchez les chiens	Manue Fleytoux	France, Belgium
2018 (31st)	Shame	Cpam	Petar Krumov	Bulgaria
2018 (31st)	The Escape	L'Èchappèe	Laëtitia Martinoni	France
2018 (31st)	Those Who Desire	Los que desean	Elena López Riera	Switzerland, Spain
2018 (31st)	What's the Damage		Heather Phillipson	United Kingdom
2018 (31st)	Wildebeest		Nicolas Keppens, Matthias Phlips	Belgium
2019 (32nd)
2019 (32nd)	The Christmas Gift	Cadoul de Crăciun	Bogdan Mureşanu	Romania, Spain
2019 (32nd)	Dogs Barking at Trees	Cães que ladram aos pássaros	Leonor Teles	Portugal
2019 (32nd)	Reconstruction	Rekonstrukce	Jiří Havlíček, Ondřej Novák	Czech Republic
2019 (32nd)	The Marvelous Misadventures of the Stone Lady	Les Extraordinaires mésaventures de la jeune fille de pierre	Gabriel Abrantes	France, Portugal
2019 (32nd)	Watermelon Juice	Suc de Síndria	Irene Moray	Spain

=== 2020s ===
Year	English title	Original title	Director(s)	Production country	Ref
2020 (33rd)
2020 (33rd)	All Cats Are Grey in the Dark	Nachts sind alle Katzen grau	Lasse Linder	Switzerland	
2020 (33rd)	Genius Loci		Adrien Mérigeau	France	
2020 (33rd)	Past Perfect		Jorge Jácome	Portugal	
2020 (33rd)	Sun Dog		Dorian Jespers	Belgium, Russia	
2020 (33rd)	Uncle Thomas: Accounting for the Days	Tio Tomás, A Contabilidade dos dias	Regina Pessoa	Portugal, Canada, France	
2021 (34th)
2021 (34th)	My Uncle Tudor	Nanu Tudor	Olga Lucovnicova	Belgium / Portugal / Hungary / Moldova	
2021 (34th)	Bella		Thelyia Petraki	Greece	
2021 (34th)	Displaced	Pa vend	Samir Karahoda	Kosovo	
2021 (34th)	Easter Eggs		Nicolas Keppens	Belgium / France / the Netherlands	
2021 (34th)	In Flow of Words		Eliane Esther Bots	the Netherlands	
2022 (35th)
2022 (35th)	Granny's Sexual Life	Babičino Seksualno Življenje	Urška Djukič, Émilie Pigeard	Slovenia / France	
2022 (35th)	Ice Merchants		João Gonzalez	Portugal / France / UK	
2022 (35th)	Love, Dad	Milý tati	Diana Cam Van Nguyen	Czechia / Slovakia	
2022 (35th)	Techno, Mama		Saulius Baradinskas	Lithuania	
2022 (35th)	Will My Parents Come to See Me		Mo Harawe	Austria / Germany / Somalia	
2023 (36th)
2023 (36th)	Hardly Working		Susanna Flock, Robin Klengel, Leonhard Müllner, Michael Stumpf	Austria	
2023 (36th)	27		Flóra Anna Buda	Hungary	
2023 (36th)	Aqueronte		Manuel Muñoz Rivas	Spain	
2023 (36th)	Daydreaming So Vividly About Our Spanish Holidays	La herida luminosa	Christian Avilés	Spain	
2023 (36th)	Flores del otro patio		Jorge Cadena	Colombia / Switzerland	
2024 (37th)
2024 (37th)	The Man Who Could Not Remain Silent	Čovjek koji nije mogao šutjeti	Nebojša Slijepčević	Bulgaria / Croatia / France / Slovenia	
2024 (37th)	2720		Basil da Cunha	Portugal / Switzerland	
2024 (37th)	Clamor		Salomé Da Souza	France	
2024 (37th)	The Exploding Girl	La Fille Qui Explose	Caroline Poggi and Jonathan Vinel	France	
2024 (37th)	Wander to Wonder		Nina Gantz	Belgium / France / Netherlands / United Kingdom	
2025 (38th)
2025 (38th)	City of Poets		Sara Rajaei	Netherlands	
2025 (38th)	Being John Smith		John Smith	United Kingdom	
2025 (38th)	L'avance		Djiby Kebe	France	
2025 (38th)	Man Number 4		Miranda Pennell	United Kingdom	
2025 (38th)	The Flowers Stand Silently, Witnessing		Theo Panagopoulos	United Kingdom	

== Most wins for Best Short film by country ==
Country	Awards	Nominations	Awards (with co-productions)	Nominations (with co-productions)
France	2	22	3	28
Poland	2	8	2	8
Hungary	2	7	2	7
Italy	2	6	2	7
Netherlands	2	6	1	6
(Republic of Ireland) Ireland	2	3	2	3
United Kingdom	1	30	1	30
Germany	1	23	1	24
Belgium	1	17	1	18
Spain	1	14	2	15
Bosnia and Herzegovina	1	3	1	4
Serbia	1	2	1	2
Croatia	1	1	2	2
Portugal	0	14	1	15
Norway	0	10	0	10
Sweden	0	8	0	8
Denmark	0	7	0	10
Finland	0	5	0	7
Austria	0	3	0	3
Romania	0	3	0	5
Switzerland	0	3	0	3
(Georgia (country)) Georgia	0	2	0	2
Bulgaria	0	2	0	2
Greece	0	2	0	2
Israel	0	2	0	2
Russia	0	2	0	3
Slovenia	0	1	1	2
Estonia	0	1	0	2
Iceland	0	1	0	2
Turkey	0	1	0	2
State of Palestine	0	1	0	2
Albania	0	1	0	1
Belarus	0	1	0	1
Chile	0	1	0	1
(Luxembourg) Luxemburg	0	1	0	1
Ukraine	0	1	0	1
Egypt	0	1	0	1
Lithuania	0	1	0	1
Kosovo	0	1	0	1
Latvia	0	1	0	1
Syria	0	0	1	1
Argentina	0	0	0	1
China	0	0	0	1
Sri Lanka	0	0	0	1
Lebanon	0	0	0	1
United States	0	0	0	1
