= 31st European Film Awards =

2018 film awards ceremony in Spain

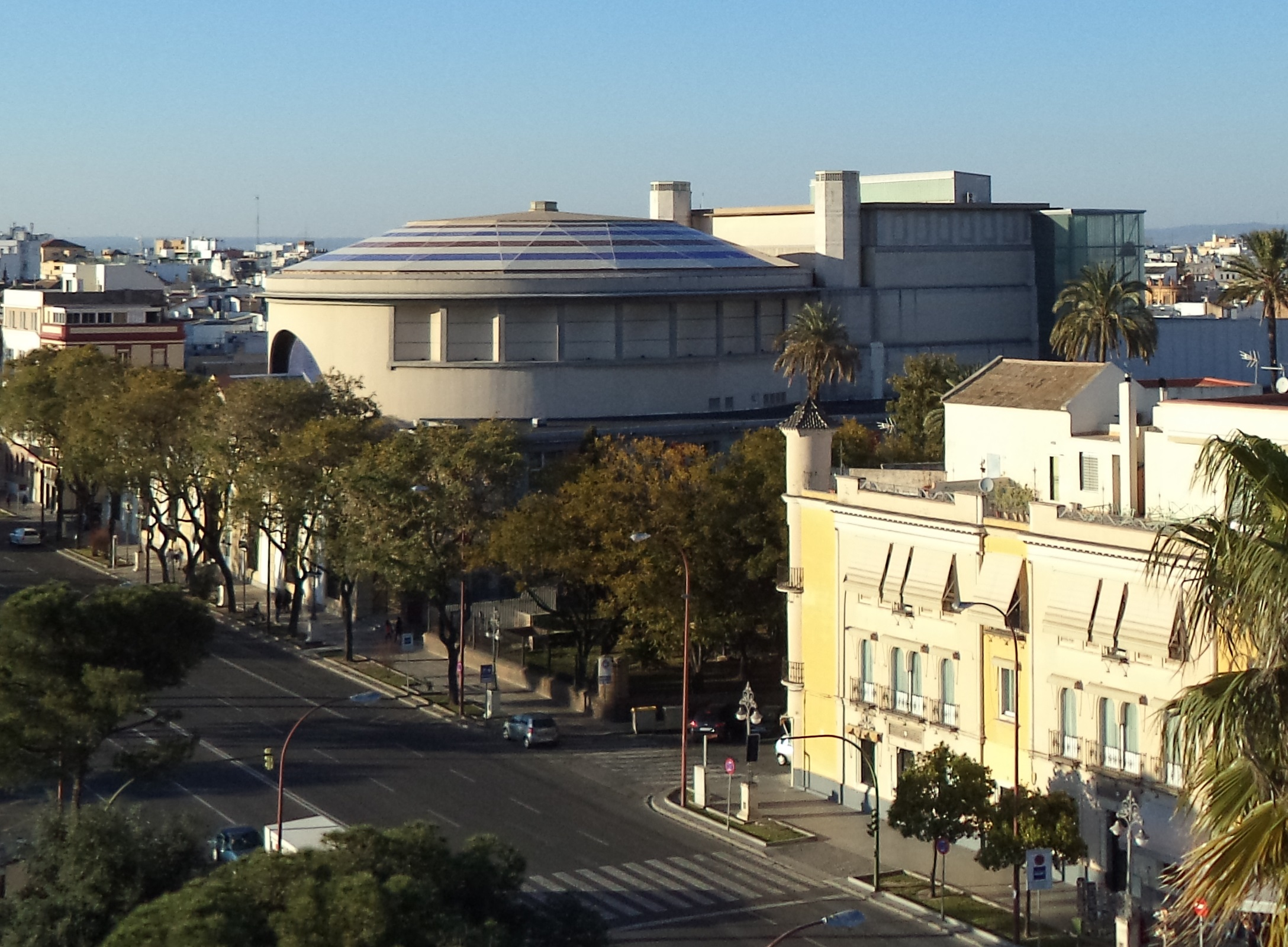
- Teatro de la Maestranza
- Date: 15 December 2018
- Site: Seville, Spain
- Organized by: European Film Academy

The 31st European Film Awards were presented on 15 December 2018 in Seville, Spain.

== Selection ==
- 3 Days in Quiberon
- Ága
- Anna's War
- Arrhythmia
- Ayka
- Beast
- Border
- Borg/McEnroe
- Carmen & Lola
- Cobain
- Cold War
- Custody
- Diamantino
- Dogman
- Donbass
- Dovlatov
- Foxtrot
- Fugue
- Girl
- Happy as Lazzaro
- Longing
- Mademoiselle Paradis
- Men Don't Cry
- Michael Inside
- Milada
- Mug
- One Day
- Paddington 2
- Petra
- Pity
- Pomegranate Orchard
- Pororoca
- Scary Mother
- Shock Waves – Diary of My Mind
- Styx
- The Captain
- Giant
- The Guilty
- The House by the Sea
- The House That Jack Built
- Summer
- The Wild Pear Tree
- Those Who Are Fine
- Touch Me Not
- Transit
- Utøya: July 22
- Under the Tree
- What Will People Say
- Woman at War

== Awards voted by EFA Members ==
=== Best Film ===
The nominees were announced on 10 November 2018.

| English title | Director(s) | Producer(s) | Production companies | Country | Language |
|---|---|---|---|---|---|
| Cold War | Pawel Pawlikowski | Tanya Seghatchian, Ewa Puszczynska | Apocalypso Pictures, BFI Film Fund, Film4, MK2 Productions, Opus Film, Protagonist Pictures | (Poland) (France) (United Kingdom) | Polish |
| Border | Ali Abbasi | Nina Bisgaard, Peter Gustafsson, Petra Jonsson | META Film, Black Spark Film & TV, Karnfilm, TriArt Film | (Sweden) (Denmark) | Swedish |
| Dogman | Matteo Garrone | Matteo Garrone, Jeremy Thomas, Jean Labadie, Paolo Del Brocco | Archimede, Le Pacte, 01 Distribution | (Italy) (France) | Italian |
| Girl | Lukas Dhont | Dirk Impens | Menuet, Frakas Productions, Topkapi Films, Netflix | (Belgium) (Netherlands) | Dutch, French |
| Happy as Lazzaro | Alice Rohrwacher | Carlo Cresto-Dina, Gregory Gajos, Pierre-François Piet, Tiziana Soudani, Michael Weber | Tempesta SRL, Amka Films Productions, Ad Vitam Production, Pola Pandora, Filmproduktions | (Italy) (Germany) (France) (Switzerland) | Italian |

=== Best Comedy ===
| English title | Director(s) | Producer(s) | Production companies | Country | Language |
|---|---|---|---|---|---|
| The Death of Stalin | Armando Iannucci | Yann Zenou, Laurent Zeitoun, Nicolas Duval Adassovsky, Kevin Loader | eOne Films, IFC, Gaumont | (France) (United Kingdom) (Belgium) | English |
| C'est la vie! | Éric Toledano and Olivier Nakache | Nicolas Duval Adassovsky, Laurent Zeitoun, Yann Zenou | Quad Productions, Ten Films | (France) | French |
| Diamantino | Gabriel Abrantes & Daniel Schmidt | Justin Taurand, Maria João Mayer, Daniel van Hoogstraten | Maria & Mayer, Les Films du Bélier, Syndrome Films | (Portugal) (France) (Brazil) | Portuguese |

=== Best Director ===
| Director(s) | English title |
|---|---|
| (Poland) Paweł Pawlikowski | Cold War |
| (Iran) / (Denmark) Ali Abbasi | Border |
| (Italy) Matteo Garrone | Dogman |
| (Israel) Samuel Maoz | Foxtrot |
| (Italy) Alice Rohrwacher | Happy as Lazzaro |

=== Best Screenwriter ===
| Screenwriter(s) | English title |
|---|---|
| (Poland) Paweł Pawlikowski | Cold War |
| (Iran) (Sweden) Ali Abbasi, Isabella Eklöf & John Ajvide Lindqvist | Border |
| (Italy) Matteo Garrone, Ugo Chiti & Massimo Gaudioso | Dogman |
| (Sweden) Gustav Möller & Emil Nygaard Albertsen | The Guilty |
| (Italy) Alice Rohrwacher | Happy as Lazzaro |

=== Best Actress ===
| Actress | English title | Role |
|---|---|---|
| (Poland) Joanna Kulig | Cold War | Zuzanna "Zula" Lichoń |
| (Germany) Marie Bäumer | 3 Days in Quiberon | Romy Schneider |
| (Iceland) Halldóra Geirharðsdóttir | Woman at War | Halla |
| (Spain) Bárbara Lennie | Petra | Petra |
| (Sweden) Eva Melander | Border | Tina |
| (Italy) Alba Rohrwacher | Happy as Lazzaro | Antonia |

=== Best Actor ===
| Actor | English title | Role |
|---|---|---|
| (Italy) Marcello Fonte | Dogman | Marcello |
| (Denmark) Jakob Cedergren | The Guilty | Asger Holm |
| (United Kingdom) Rupert Everett | The Happy Prince | Oscar Wilde |
| (Sweden) Sverrir Gudnason | Borg vs McEnroe | Björn Borg |
| (Poland) Tomasz Kot | Cold War | Wiktor Warski |
| (Belgium) Victor Polster | Girl | Lara |

== Technical awards ==
=== Best Composer ===
| Winner(s) | English title |
|---|---|
| (Germany) Christoph M. Kaiser and Julian Maas | 3 Days in Quiberon |

=== Best Cinematographer ===
| Winner(s) | English title |
|---|---|
| (Norway) Martin Otterbeck | Utøya: July 22 |

=== Best Editor ===
| Winner(s) | English title |
|---|---|
| (Poland) Jarosław Kamiński | Cold War |

=== Best Production Designer ===
| Winner(s) | English title |
|---|---|
| (Russia) Andrey Ponkratov | Summer |

=== Best Costume Designer ===
| English title | Winner(s) |
|---|---|
| (Italy) Massimo Cantini Parrini | Dogman |

=== Best Sound Designer ===
| Winner(s) | English title |
|---|---|
| (Germany) André Bendocchi-Alves and Martin Steyer | The Captain |

=== Best Makeup and Hairstyling ===
| Winner(s) | English title |
|---|---|
| (Italy) Dalia Colli, Lorenzo Tamburini and Daniela Tartari | Dogman |

=== Best Visual Effects ===
| Winner(s) | English title |
|---|---|
| (Sweden) Peter Hjorth | Border |

== Critics Award ==
=== European Discovery ===
| English title | Director(s) | Producer(s) | Production companies | Country | Language |
|---|---|---|---|---|---|
| Girl | Lukas Dhont | Dirk Impens | Menuet, Frakas Productions, Topkapi Films, Netflix | (Belgium) (Netherlands) | Dutch, French |
| One Day | Zsófia Szilágyi | Edina Kenesei, Ági Pataki | Filmpartners, Sparks, Vertigo Média Kft., Zeta Filmes | (Hungary) | Hungarian, Italian |
| Scary Mother | Ana Urushadze | Lasha Khalvashi, Tinatin Kajrishvili | Artizm, Gemini, Allfilm, Georgian National Film Centre | (Georgia (country)) (Estonia) | Georgian |
| The Guilty | Gustav Möller | Lina Flint | Nordisk Film Spring, New Danish Screen, Magnolia Pictures | (Denmark) | Danish |
| Those Who Are Fine | Cyril Schäublin | Silvan Hillmann, Cyril Schäublin, Lara Hacisalihzade | Seeland Filmproduktion, Film IGRF | (Switzerland) | Swiss, German |
| Touch Me Not | Adina Pintilie | Adina Pintilie, Bianca Oana, Philippe Avril | Manekino Film, 4 Proof Film, Agitprop, Les Films de l'Étranger, Pink Productions, Rohfilm | (Romania) (Germany) (Czech Republic) (Bulgaria) (France) | English, German |

== Best Animated Feature Film ==
| English title | Director(s) | Producer(s) | Production companies | Country | Language |
|---|---|---|---|---|---|
| Another Day of Life | Raul de la Fuente & Damian Nenow | Jarek Sawko, Amaia Remirez, Ole Østergaard | Platige Image, Kanaki Films | (Poland) (Spain) (Belgium) (Germany) (Hungary) | Polish |
| Early Man | Nick Park | Peter Lord, David Sproxton, Nick Park, Carla Shelley, Richard Beek | Aardman Animations, British Film Institute, StudioCanal | (United Kingdom) | English |
| The Breadwinner | Nora Twomey | Anthony Leo, Tomm Moore, Andrew Rosen, Paul Young | Cartoon Saloon, Aircraft Pictures, Guru Studio, Jolie Pas, Irish Film Board, Melusine Productions, Telefilm Canada, Elevation Pictures, StudioCanal | (Republic of Ireland) (Canada) (Luxembourg) | English |
| White Fang | Alexandre Espigares | Clément Calvet, Jérémie Fajner, Peter Saraf, Marc Turtletaub, Lilian Eche, Christel Henon | Superprod, Bidibul Productions, Big Beach, Wild Bunch | (France) (Luxembourg) | French |

== Audience awards ==
=== People's Choice Award ===
| English title | Director(s) | Production country |
|---|---|---|
| Call Me by Your Name | Luca Guadagnino | (Italy) (France) (United States) (Brazil) |
| Borg vs McEnroe | Janus Metz Pedersen | (Sweden) (Denmark) (Finland) (Czech Republic) |
| C'est la vie! | Éric Toledano and Olivier Nakache | (France) |
| Dunkirk | Christopher Nolan | (United Kingdom) (Netherlands) (France) (United States) |
| Darkest Hour | Joe Wright | (United Kingdom) |
| In the Fade | Fatih Akin | (Germany) |
| The Death of Stalin | Armando Iannucci | (United Kingdom) (France) |
| Valerian and the City of a Thousand Planets | Luc Besson | (France) |
| Victoria & Abdul | Stephen Frears | (United Kingdom) |

=== University Award ===
| English title | Director(s) | Producer(s) | Production companies | Country | Language |
|---|---|---|---|---|---|
| Happy as Lazzaro | Alice Rohrwacher | Carlo Cresto-Dina, Gregory Gajos, Pierre-François Piet, Tiziana Soudani, Michael Weber | Tempesta SRL, Amka Films Productions, Ad Vitam Production, Pola Pandora, Filmproduktions | (Italy) (Germany) (France) (Switzerland) | Italian |
| Foxtrot | Samuel Maoz | Michael Weber, Viola Fügen, Eitan Mansuri, Cedomir Kolar, Marc Baschet & Michel Merktri | Bord Cadre Films | (Israel) (Germany) (France) (Switzerland) | Hebrew |
| Styx | Wolfgang Fischer | Marcos Kantis, Martin Lehwald | A.S.A.P., ARTE, Arte France Cinéma | (Germany) (Austria) | German |
| Tarzan's Testicles | Alexandru Solomon | Ada Solomon, Cedric Bonin, Pascaline Geoffroy | HI Film Productions, Seppia Production | (Romania) (France) | Russian |
| Utøya: July 22 | Erik Poppe | Stein B. Kvae & Finn Gjerdrum | Paradox Film 7, Paradox, MEDIA Programme of the European Union | (Norway) | Norwegian |

== Best Documentary ==
| English title | Director(s) | Producer(s) | Production companies | Country | Language |
|---|---|---|---|---|---|
| Bergman - A Year in a Life | Jane Magnusson | Mattias Nohrborg, Cecilia Nessen, Fredrik Heinig | B-Reel Films, Carlotta Films, Filmarti, Imovision | (Sweden) (Germany) | Swedish, English, German |
| A Woman Captured | Bernadett Tuza-Ritter | Julianna Ugrin, Viki Réka Kiss | Éclipse Film, Corso Film | (Hungary) (Germany) | Hungarian |
| Of Fathers and Sons | Talal Derki | Eva Kemme, Hans Robert Eisenhauer, Ansgar Frerich, Tobias Siebert | Cinema Group Production, Südwestrundfunk, Impact Partners, Basis Berlin Filmproduktion, Ventana Film- und Fernsehproduktion | (Germany) (Syria) (Lebanon) (Qatar) | Arabic |
| The Distant Barking of Dogs | Simon Lering Wilmont | Monica Hellström | Final Cut for Real | (Denmark) (Finland) (Sweden) | Russian |
| The Silence of Others | Almudena Carracedo & Robert Bahar | Almudena Carracedo, Robert Bahar | Semilla Verde Productions, Lucernam Films, Blue Ice Docs, El Deseo, ITVS, Latino Public Broadcasting, P.O.V. | (Spain) (United States) | Spanish |

== Best Short Film ==
| Original title | Director(s) | Minutes | Production country |
|---|---|---|---|
| The Years | Sara Fgaier | 20 min. | (Italy) (France) |
| Aquaparque | Ana Moreira | 17 min. | (Portugal) |
| Burkina Brandenburg Komplex | Ulu Braun | 19 min. | (Germany) |
| Graduation '97 | Pavlo Ostrikov | 19 min. | (Ukraine) |
| I Signed the Petition | Mahdi Fleifel | 19 min. | (United Kingdom) (Germany) (Switzerland) |
| Kapitalistis | Pablo Muñoz Gómez | 15 min. | (Belgium) (France) |
| Kontener | Sebastian Lang | 30 min. | (Germany) |
| Meryem | Reber Dosky | 16 min. | (Netherlands) |
| Prisoner of Society | Rati Tsiteladze | 15 min. | (Georgia (country)) |
| Release The Dogs | Manue Fleytoux | 21 min. | (France) (Belgium) |
| Shame | Petar Krumov | 24 min. | (Bulgaria) |
| The Escape | Laëtitia Martinoni | 10 min. | (France) |
| Those Who Desire | Elena López Riera | 24 min. | (Switzerland) (Spain) |
| What's The Damage | Heather Phillipson | 7 min. | (United Kingdom) |
| Wildebeest | Nicolas Keppens, Matthias Phlips | 19 min. | (Belgium) |

== European Co-Production Award — Prix Eurimages ==
| Recipient | Occupation |
|---|---|
| (Greece) Konstantinos Kontovrakis (Greece) Giorgos Karnavas | Producer |

== Honorary Awards ==
=== European Achievement in World Cinema ===
| Recipient | Occupation |
|---|---|
| (United Kingdom) Ralph Fiennes | Actor, film producer and director |

=== Lifetime Achievement Award ===
| Recipient | Occupation |
|---|---|
| (Spain) Carmen Maura | Actress |
