= Štrpci massacre =

1993 mass killing during the Bosnian War

- Part of the Bosnian War
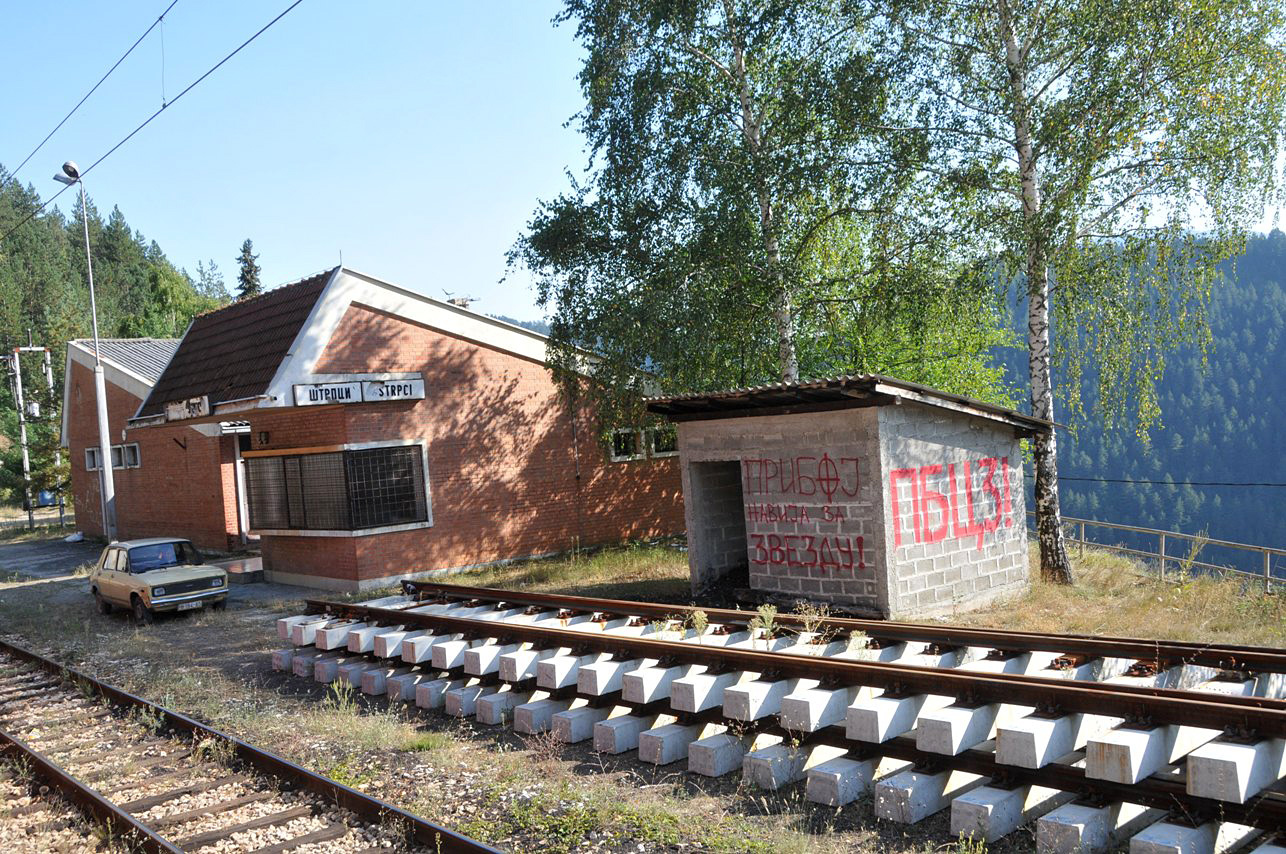
- Štrpci railway station

- Štrpci railway station (Bosnia and Herzegovina)
- Location: 43°38′19″N 19°30′11″E; Višegrad, Bosnia and Herzegovina
- Date: 27 February 1993
- Attack type: Mass killing
- Deaths: 18 Bosniaks; 1 Croat
- Perpetrators: Avengers paramilitary unit, under the command of Milan Lukić

The Štrpci massacre (Bosnian: Masakr u Štrpcima) was the massacre of 19 civilians (18 Bosniaks and one Croat) on 27 February 1993, taken from a Belgrade-Bar train at Štrpci railway station near Višegrad, on Bosnian territory.

Members of the Serbian Avengers (Osvetnici) paramilitary unit, commanded by Milan Lukić, were responsible for the abductions and subsequent massacre. The Štrpci massacre, Bosanska Jagodina massacre, Sjeverin massacre, and the Višegrad massacres were part of a campaign of senseless wrath attacks conducted against Bosniaks in the Višegrad area by Lukić and his paramilitary unit.

== Massacre ==
The Belgrade-Bar railway crosses into Bosnia and Herzegovina for 9 km, between the stations at Jablanica and Rača, both in Serbia. There is one station, Štrpci, but there are no border crossing facilities and only three trains per direction call at the station every day.

At approximately 15:00 on 27 February 1993, a group of uniformed men entered the office of the Štrpci railway station and demanded that the oncoming train from Belgrade be stopped. The uniformed men were members of the "Avengers" (Osvetnici) unit of the White Eagles Bosnian-Serb militia, commanded by Milan Lukić. The men entered the train once it came to a halt and abducted 20 passengers after checking their IDs. Those abducted included a Yugoslav Railways ticket collector, Muslim and Croat passengers, a retired Yugoslav Army officer as well as one unknown person of Arabic/African origin. The victims were trucked to the command of the First Battalion of the Second Podrinje Brigade of the VRS, in the Prelovo school building (Višegradska Banja). The perpetrators brought them to the gym, ordered them to undress, then beat them up and tied their hands with wire. Already covered in blood, the civilian victims were trucked to a destroyed house in Mušići, where they were shot dead. Their bodies were dumped in the Drina river, never to be found, save for the remains of four victims, later dug up from Lake Perucac.

A witness, Hadija Mujevic, was on the train and saw soldiers enter it at Štrpci and check the ID of male passengers. He said: “I saw them take people away and load them onto a truck. I saw a man in a postal or maybe railway uniform staggering and soldiers hitting him with rifle butts and escorting him to the truck,” Mujevic said. Other passengers told her that Bosniaks were being taken off the train. “Some said, ‘Leave those men alone,’ while others said, ‘Take the Balijas,’” Mujevic told the prosecution.

Djordje Vujovic heard about the abduction from a friend. His underage nephew, Senad Djecevic, was among the passengers. He travelled straight away to Visegrad, where he arranged a meeting with Milan Lukic as he suspected he was involved in the action. “I spoke to Milan Lukic. Their headquarters were in a former café next to the bridge... He denied having anything to do with it, saying it had been done by the Garavi Sokak [another paramilitary unit],’” Vujovic said.

In December 2014, Koviljka Buzov stated to the Serbian War Crimes Prosecution that her husband Tomo Buzov, former officer of the Yugoslav People's Army, was travelling to Podgorica to visit their son, serving in the army. He informed her that the train was late; only later, her son told her that his father had never arrived. She heard of the abduction in Štrpci from the news the day after.

Again in 2014, Misin Rastoder reported that his father Jusuf Rastoder was travelling from his workplace in Belgrade to Bijelo Polje for his leave. Misin did not know that his father was on the train when he heard about the kidnapping. He later received his father's salary from a colleague. Jusuf's body was recovered from Lake Perucac.

== Trials ==
Of the approximately 30 suspects, the first individual convicted for his role in the crime was Nebojša Ranisavljević from Despotovac. He was arrested in October 1996. The Higher Court in Bijelo Polje sentenced him to 15 years in prison on 9 September 2002. The verdict was confirmed by the Supreme Court of Montenegro in April 2004. Ranisavljević was released from prison in 2011 after serving nine years of his sentence. The Commander of the Republika Srpska army's (VRS) Višegrad brigade, Luka Dragićević, admitted at Ranisavljević's trial that the "Avengers" unit was part of the VRS. After the war Dragićević was transferred to a position in the Yugoslav army.

Amnesty International expressed concern that Ranisavljević had been made a scapegoat and that the trial was a token affair. It was alleged that Ranisavljević had been tortured in detention to force him to make incriminating statements.

Senior officials in the Serbian and Federal Republic of Yugoslavia (FRY) governments were alerted to the plan to abduct citizens of the FRY but no action was taken to prevent the crime. Police and judicial officials are alleged to have obstructed court proceedings against Milan Lukić.

In October 2022, seven former soldiers of the VRS Second Podrinje Brigade were found guilty of the massacre, in first instance, by the Court of Bosnia and Herzegovina after a high-profile seven-year trial. Obrad and Novak Poluga, Petko Indjic, Radojica Ristic, Dragan Sekaric, Oliver Krsmanovic and Miodrag Mitrasinovic were condemned to 13 years each as co-perpetrators of the massacre. Mico Jovicic, admitted his guilt and was sentenced to 5 years after a plea bargain with the prosecution. Vuk Ratkovic, died before the sentence, in March 2021. Their commander, Boban Indjic, was sentenced to 15 years by the same court on 19 January 2023. The commander of the VRS Second Podrinje Brigade from Visegrad, Luka Dragicevic, was acquitted of ordering the abduction and killing.

The leader of the White Eagles Milan Lukic (already jailed for life by the ICTY) was also indicted in Bosnia Herzegovina for the Štrpci massacre in 2020. At the October 2022 ruling, judge Vesna Jesenkovic stated that Lukic participated in the killing of 18 of the victims, while the last two were killed while trying to flee – one of them by Nebojsa Ranisavljevic, who was jailed for 15 years by a Montenegrin court, and the other by an unknown soldier.

A trial in Serbia of five other Bosnian Serb paramilitaries for the Štrpci massacre is ongoing since 2019. The proceeding has been plagued by delays, with one defendant dying and another becoming too sick to stand trial.

== Legacy ==
The short film The Man Who Could Not Remain Silent (Čovjek koji nije mogao šutjeti) by Croatian film director Nebojša Slijepčević dramatizes the massacre, centered on the decision by Tomo Buzov to stand up against the perpetrators. The film won the Short Film Palme d'Or at the 2024 Cannes Film Festival. On January 23, 2025, the film got nominated on 97th Academy Awards in Best Live Action Short Film category, becoming Croatia's first nomination since its independence.

In 2026, the UDIK published a book of verdicts of the Štrpci massacre.

== See also ==
- List of massacres in Bosnia and Herzegovina
