= Tomo Buzov =

Yugoslav Army officer (1940–1993)

- Born: Tomislav Buzov; 20 February 1940; Kaštel Novi, Yugoslavia (now Croatia)
- Died: 27 February 1993 (aged 53); Štrpci near Višegrad, Bosnia and Herzegovina
- Cause of death: Murder
- Occupation: Yugoslav People's Army officer
- Known for: Trying to prevent the Štrpci massacre

Tomislav "Tomo" Buzov (20 February 1940 – 27 February 1993) was a Croatian army officer in the Yugoslav People's Army who was murdered during the Štrpci massacre while trying to fend off perpetrators of the massacre.

His death has been the subject of the Palme d'Or-winning short film The Man Who Could Not Remain Silent.

== Biography ==
Buzov was an ethnic Croat, born in Kaštel Novi near Split in 1940. As a professional soldier in the Yugoslav People's Army, he had moved to Belgrade and spent most of his life there as a navy officer and signalman. He went into early retirement some time before the commencement of the Yugoslav Wars in the early 1990s.

On 27 February 1993, Buzov was traveling by train from Belgrade to Bar to visit his son Darko, who was doing his regular military service stationed in Montenegro. As the train was passing through eastern Bosnia, where the Bosnian War was raging, members of the Army of Republika Srpska (VRS) stopped the train at a railway station in the small village of Štrpci near Priboj.

The soldiers inspected the train and singled out 20 ethnic Bosniak civilians among the passengers. One of those civilians, a 17-year-old boy, was sitting in the compartment with Buzov. Buzov asked the soldiers what they were doing and what army they belonged to, and told them that he was a retired officer. They said it was none of his business, and started to escort the civilians out of the train. Buzov told the boy to remain seated and went out instead of him.

The 20 civilians, including Buzov, were then taken to the local VRS command post, beaten and handcuffed with wire, and then taken to a place near Višegrad where they were shot, with their bodies thrown into the Drina. The massacre is believed to have been committed by the Serb paramilitary unit White Eagles led by commander Milan Lukić.

== Aftermath ==
In 2009, Lukić was sentenced to life imprisonment by the International Court in the Hague for other crimes. A Bosnian court accused him in 2020 for the massacre in Štrpci, but Lukić, imprisoned in Estonia, refused to acknowledge it. In 2023, a court in Sarajevo sentenced seven Bosnian Serbs to 91 years in prison for murdering 20 non-Serbian civilians from the train.

The Bosniak kid saved by Buzov survived the war and has three children.

== Legacy ==
The municipality of New Belgrade placed a memorial plaque on the building where Buzov lived. The inscription reads: "Tomo Buzov. JNA Captain First Class. In memory of the humanity and courage of the man who lived at this address. April 2023."

There is a memorial plaque and a dock named after him in his hometown of Kaštel Novi.

Buzov is the subject of the 2024 short film The Man Who Could Not Remain Silent, based on his death. It was directed by Nebojša Slijepčević, with Dragan Mićanović portraying Buzov. The film was a Croatian-Bulgarian-French-Slovenian co-production. It won the Short Film Palme d'Or at the 2024 Cannes Film Festival, as well as Best Fiction Short Film at the 50th César Awards and European Short Film at the 37th European Film Awards, while also being nominated for Best Live Action Short Film at the 97th Academy Awards.

== See also ==
- Srđan Aleksić, a Bosnian Serb, who was also killed in 1993 for defending a Bosniak.
