= List of Luxembourgish European Film Award winners and nominees =

This is a list of Luxembourgish European Film Award winners and nominees. This list details the performances of Luxembourgish actors, actresses, and films that have either been submitted or nominated for, or have won, a European Film Award.

== Main categories ==
Year	Award	Recipient	Status	Note
2009	Best European Co-Producer	Jani Thiltges	Won	
2013	Best Animated Feature Film	The Congress	Won	Israeli-German-Polish-Luxembourgish-French-Belgian co-production
2013	Best Animated Feature Film	Pinocchio	Nominated	Italian-Luxembourgish-French-Belgian co-production
2022	Best European Film	Corsage	Nominated	Austria-Luxembourgish-German-French co-production

== See also ==
- List of Luxembourgish submissions for the Academy Award for Best Foreign Language Film
