= 28th European Film Awards =

2015 film awards ceremony in Germany

- Date: 12 December 2015
- Site: Berlin, Germany
- Organized by: European Film Academy

Highlights
- Best Picture: Youth
- Best Actor: Michael Caine
- Best Actress: Charlotte Rampling

Television coverage
- Channel: Arte

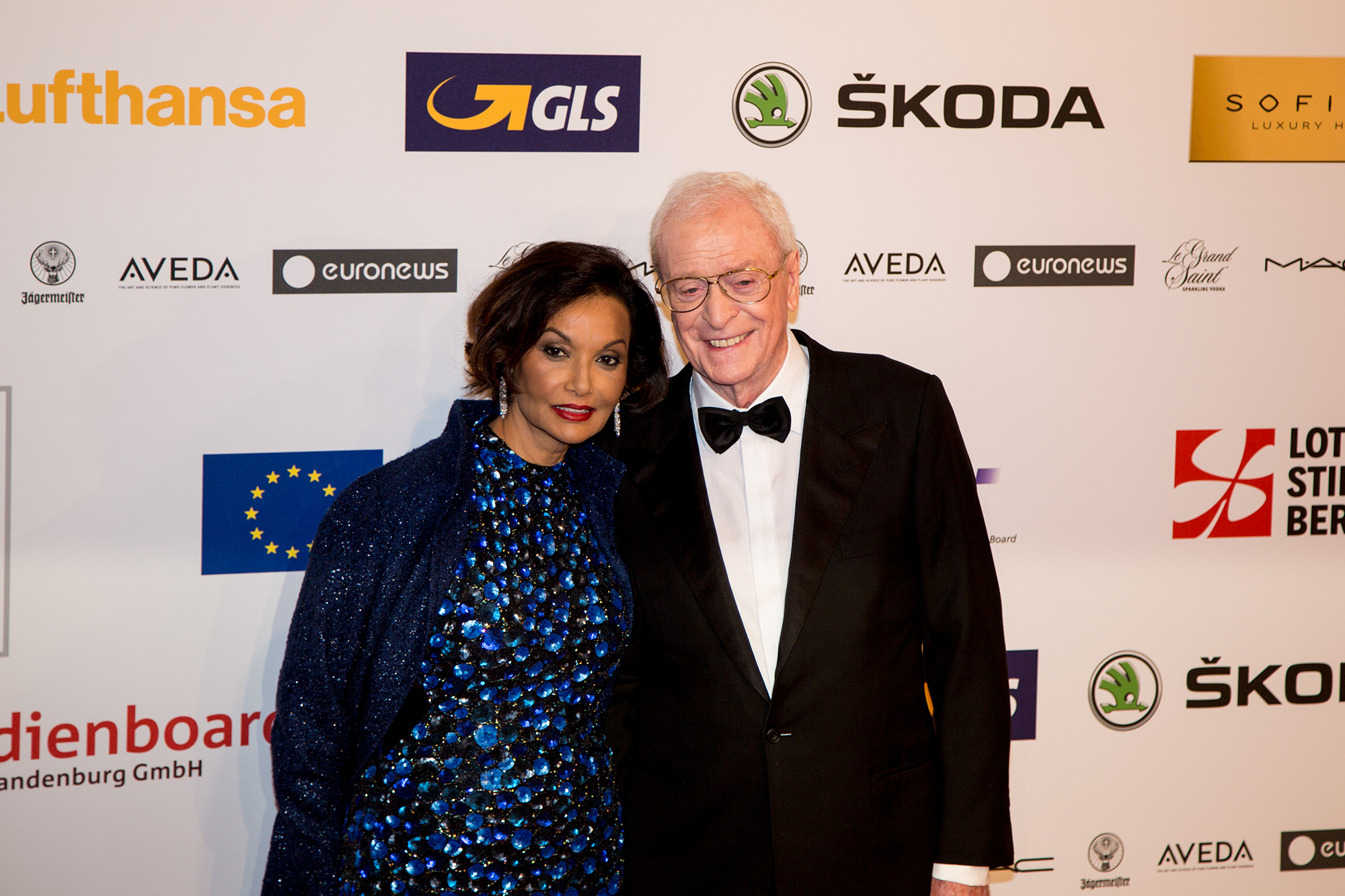
Sir Michael Caine, 28th EFA Awards 2015, Berlin

The 28th European Film Awards were presented on 12 December 2015 in Berlin, Germany. The winners were selected by more than 2,500 members of the European Film Academy.

== Winners and nominees ==
=== European Film ===
English title	Original title	Director(s)	Production country
Youth	Youth - La giovinezza	Paolo Sorrentino	(Italy) (France) (United Kingdom) (Switzerland)
The Lobster		Yorgos Lanthimos	(Republic of Ireland) (United Kingdom) (Greece) (France) (Netherlands)
Mustang		Deniz Gamze Ergüven	(France) (Turkey) (Germany)
A Pigeon Sat on a Branch Reflecting on Existence	En duva satt på en gren och funderade på tillvaron	Roy Andersson	(Sweden) (Norway) (France) (Germany)
Rams	Hrútar	Grímur Hákonarson	(Iceland) (Denmark)
Victoria		Sebastian Schipper	(Germany)

=== European Comedy ===
English title	Original title	Director(s)	Production country
A Pigeon Sat on a Branch Reflecting on Existence	En duva satt på en gren och funderade på tillvaron	Roy Andersson	(Sweden) (Norway) (France) (Germany)
The Bélier Family	La Famille Bélier	Éric Lartigau	(France)
The Brand New Testament	Le Tout Nouveau Testament	Jaco Van Dormael	(France) (Belgium) (Luxembourg)

=== European Documentary ===
English title	Original title	Director(s)	Production country
Amy		Asif Kapadia	(United Kingdom)
Dancing with Maria		Ivan Gergolet	(Italy) (Argentina) (Slovenia)
The Look of Silence	Senyap	Joshua Oppenheimer	(Denmark) (Finland) (Indonesia) (Norway) (United Kingdom)
A Syrian Love Story		Sean McAllister	(United Kingdom) (France)
Toto and His Sisters		Alexander Nanau	(Romania) (Hungary)

=== European Animated Feature Film 2015 ===
English title	Original title	Director(s)	Animation	Production country
Song of the Sea		Tomm Moore	Fabian Earlinghauser & Sean McCarron	(Republic of Ireland) (Belgium) (Denmark) (France) (Luxembourg)
Adama		Simon Rouby	Pierre Ducos	(France)
Shaun the Sheep Movie		Richard Starzak & Mark Burton	Will Becher	(United Kingdom) (France)

=== People's Choice Award for Best European Film ===
English title	Original title	Director(s)	Writers(s)	Production country
Marshland	La isla mínima	Alberto Rodríguez	Alberto Rodríguez, Rafael Cobos	(Spain)
A Pigeon Sat on a Branch Reflecting on Existence	En duva satt på en gren och funderade på tillvaron	Roy Andersson	Roy Andersson	(Sweden) (Germany) (France) (Norway)
Force Majeure	Turist	Ruben Östlund	Ruben Östlund	(Sweden) (Norway) (France) (Denmark)
Leviathan	Левиафан	Andrey Zvyagintsev	Oleg Negin, Andrey Zvyagintsev	(Russia)
Samba	Samba	Éric Toledano, Olivier Nakache	Éric Toledano, Olivier Nakache	(France)
Serial (Bad) Weddings	Qu'est-ce qu'on a fait au Bon Dieu ?	Philippe de Chauveron	Guy Laurent, Philippe de Chauveron	(France)
The Imitation Game	The Imitation Game	Morten Tyldum	Graham Moore	(United Kingdom) (United States)
The Salt of the Earth	Le Sel de la Terre	Wim Wenders, Juliano Ribeiro Salgado	David Rosier, Juliano Ribeiro Salgado, Wim Wenders	(France)
Victoria	Victoria	Sebastian Schipper	Sebastian Schipper	(Germany)
White God	Fehér isten	Kornél Mundruczó	Viktória Petrányi, Kornél Mundruczó, Kata Wéber	(Hungary) (Sweden) (Germany)

=== European Discovery – Prix FIPRESCI ===
English title	Original title	Director(s)	Production country
Mustang		Deniz Gamze Ergüven	(France) (Germany) (Turkey)
Goodnight Mommy	Ich seh Ich seh	Veronika Franz, Severin Fiala	(Austria)
Limbo		Anna Sofie Hartmann	(Germany) (Denmark)
Slow West		John Maclean	(New Zealand) (United Kingdom)
Summers Downstairs	Im Sommer wohnt er unten	Tom Sommerlatte	(Germany) (France)

=== European Director ===
Director(s)	English title	Original title
(Italy) Paolo Sorrentino	Youth	Youth - La giovinezza
(Poland) Małgorzata Szumowska	Body	Body / Ciało
(Greece) Yorgos Lanthimos	The Lobster	
(Italy) Nanni Moretti	Mia madre	
(Sweden) Roy Andersson	A Pigeon Sat on a Branch Reflecting on Existence	En duva satt på en gren och funderade på tillvaron
(Germany) Sebastian Schipper	Victoria	

=== European Screenwriter ===
Screenwriter(s)	English title	Original title
(Greece) Yorgos Lanthimos (Greece) Efthimis Filippou	The Lobster	
(Romania) Radu Jude (Romania) Florin Lazarescu	Aferim!	
(United Kingdom) Alex Garland	Ex Machina	
(United Kingdom) Andrew Haigh	45 Years	
(Sweden) Roy Andersson	A Pigeon Sat on a Branch Reflecting on Existence	En duva satt på en gren och funderade på tillvaron
(Italy) Paolo Sorrentino	Youth	Youth - La giovinezza

=== European Actor ===
Actor	English title	Original title
(United Kingdom) Michael Caine	Youth	Youth - La giovinezza
(United Kingdom) Tom Courtenay	45 Years	
(Republic of Ireland) Colin Farrell	The Lobster	The Lobster
(Germany) Christian Friedel	13 Minutes	Elser - Er hätte die Welt verändert
(France) Vincent Lindon	The Measure of a Man	La Loi du marché

=== European Actress ===
Actress	English title	Original title
(United Kingdom) Charlotte Rampling	45 Years	
(Italy) Margherita Buy	Mia madre	Mia madre
(Spain) Laia Costa	Victoria	Victoria
(Sweden) Alicia Vikander	Ex Machina	Ex Machina
(United Kingdom) / (United States) Rachel Weisz	Youth	Youth - La giovinezza

=== European Cinematographer 2015 – Prix Carlo di Palma ===
English title	Original title	Winner(s)	Nationality
Goodnight Mommy	Ich seh Ich seh	Martin Gschlacht	(Austria)

=== European Editor 2015 ===
English title	Original title	Winner(s)	Nationality
Body	Ciało	Jacek Drosio	(Poland)

=== European Production Designer 2015 ===
English title	Original title	Winner(s)	Nationality
The Brand New Testament	Le Tout Nouveau Testament	Sylvie Olivé	(France)

=== European Costume Designer 2015 ===
English title	Original title	Winner(s)	Nationality
The Lobster		Sarah Blenkinsop	(United Kingdom)

=== European Composer 2015 ===
English title	Original title	Winner(s)	Nationality
The Duke of Burgundy		Cat's Eyes	(United Kingdom)

=== European Sound Designer 2015 ===
English title	Original title	Winner(s)	Nationality
Arabian Nights – Vol. I-III	As Mil e uma noites – Vol. I-III	Vasco Pimentel & Miguel Martins	(Portugal)

=== European Co-Production Award — Prix Eurimages ===
Recipient	Occupation	Nationality
Andrea Occhipinti	Producer	(Italy)

=== European Achievement in World Cinema ===
Recipient	Occupation	Nationality
Christoph Waltz	Actor and director	(Germany) (Austria)

=== Lifetime Achievement Award ===
Recipient	Occupation	Nationality
Charlotte Rampling	Actress	(United Kingdom)

=== Honorary Award of the EFA President and Board ===
Recipient	Occupation	Nationality
Michael Caine	Actor	(United Kingdom)

=== Young Audience Award ===
Twelve- to fourteen-year-old audiences from across Europe voted for the winner after watching the three nominated films at special screenings held on "Young Audience Film Day" on 3 May.

English title	Original title	Director(s)	Writers(s)	Production country
The Invisible Boy	Il ragazzo invisibile	Gabriele Salvatores	Alessandro Fabbri, Ludovica Rampoldi, Stefano Sardo	(Italy)
My Skinny Sister	Min lilla syster	Sanna Lenken	Sanna Lenken	(Sweden) (Germany)
You're Ugly Too		Mark Noonan	Mark Noonan	(Republic of Ireland)

=== European Short Film 2015 ===
The nominees for Best Short Film were selected by independent juries at a series of film festivals throughout Europe.

English title	Original title	Director(s)	Country	Nominating Festival
Picnic	Piknik	Jure Pavlović	(Croatia)	Drama International Short Film Festival
Dissonance		Till Nowak	(Germany)	Berlin International Film Festival
E.T.E.R.N.I.T.		Giovanni Aloi	(France)	Venice Film Festival
Field Study		Eva Weber	(United Kingdom)	Cork Film Festival
Kung Fury		David Sandberg	(Sweden)	Vila do Conde Film Festival
Listen	Kuuntele	Hamy Ramezan & Rungano Nyoni	(Denmark) (Finland)	Tampere Film Festival
Our Body	Naše telo	Dane Komljen	(Serbia) (Bosnia and Herzegovina)	International Film Festival Rotterdam
Over		Jörn Threlfall	(United Kingdom)	Encounters Short Film and Animation Festival
Smile, and the World Will Smile Back	Im tekhayekh, ha'Olam yekhayekh elekha	Yoav Gross, Ehab Tarabieh & the al-Haddad family	(Israel) (Palestine)	Clermont-Ferrand International Short Film Festival
Son of the Wolf	Fils du loup	Lola Quivoron	(France)	Locarno International Film Festival
Symbolic Threats		Mischa Leinkauf, Lutz Henke & Matthias Wermke	(Germany)	Grimstad Film Festival
The Runner	El corredor	José Luis Montesinos	(Spain)	Valladolid International Film Festival
The Translator	Çevirmen	Emre Kayiş	(United Kingdom) (Turkey)	Sarajevo Film Festival
This Place We Call Our Home		Thora Lorentzen & Sybilla Tuxen	(Denmark)	Kraków Film Festival
Washingtonia		Konstantina Kotzamani	(Greece)	Film Fest Gent
