= I Am Here =

I Am Here or #iamhere or IAmHere may refer to:

== Films ==
- Main Hoon Na or I Am Here, a 2004 Indian Hindi-language film by Farah Khan
- I Am Here (film), a 2016 Canadian animated short film
- I Am Here, also known as The 11th Hour, a 2014 film by Anders Morgenthaler
- #Iamhere, 2019 French comedy film
- I Am Here.... Now, film by Neil Breen

== Songs ==
- "I Am Here", the English-language version of "Estoy Aquí", by Shakira
- "I Am Here" ("Sono Qui" English version), by Andrea Bocelli from the album Sì, 2018
- "I Am Here (Trust Me)", a song by JK-47, 2020

== Other ==
- I Am Here!, a Japanese manga series
- Iamhere (social movement), the #iamhere movement that counteracts hate speech and misinformation on social media

== See also ==
- I'm Here (disambiguation)
