= European Film Award for Best European Co-Producer =

European Film Award Prix Eurimages
- Awarded for: Best European Co-Producer of the Year
- Country: Europe
- Presented by: European Film Academy
- First award: 2007
- Currently held by: Andrea Occhipinti (2015)
- Website: http://www.europeanfilmawards.eu/

The European Film Award - Prix Eurimages has been awarded annually since 2007 by the European Film Academy. The winners are:

Year	Name	Nationality	References
2007	Margaret Menegoz	Hungary	
2007	Veit Heiduschka	Austria	
2008	Bettina Brokemper	Germany	
2008	Vibeke Windeløv	Denmark	
2009	Diana Elbaum	Belgium	
2009	Jani Thiltges	Luxembourg	
2010	Zeynep Özbatur Atakan	Turkey	
2011	Mariela Besuievsky	Spain	
2012	Helena Danielsson	Sweden	
2013	Ada Solomon	Romania	
2014	Ed Guiney	Ireland	
2015	Andrea Occhipinti	Italy	
2016	Leontine Petit	the Netherlands	
2017	Čedomir Kolar	Croatia	
2018	Konstantinos Kontovrakis Giorgos Karnavas	Greece	
2019	Ankica Jurić Tilić	Croatia	
2020	Luís Urbano	Portugal	
