= The Missing Scarf =

- Directed by: Eoin Duffy
- Produced by: Jamie Hogan
- Starring: George Takei
- Music by: Echolab
- Release date: October 9, 2013
- Running time: 7 minutes
- Country: Ireland
- Language: English

The Missing Scarf is a 2013 Irish animated, dark comedy-related, adventure short film directed by Eoin Duffy, produced by Jamie Hogan and narrated by George Takei. The film was shortlisted for the 86th Academy Awards. The project was created in conjunction with Irish Film Board, Raidió Teilifís Éireann and Arts Council of Ireland, the short film is made in Blender3D, making the first Blender3D-made short film to be shortlisted for an Academy Award for Best Animated Short Film in 2014.

== Plot ==
Albert the Squirrel makes a startling discovery ... an empty space where once his favourite scarf lay. He heads off into the forest only to find everyone else is preoccupied with worries of their own. He helps who he can before moving on but never seems to get any closer to his goal. It is meant to explore life's many fears.

== Cast ==
- George Takei as Narrator

== Accolades ==
Awards
Award	Date of ceremony	Category	Result
Galway Film Fleadh	July 13, 2013	The James Horgan Award for Best Animation	Won
LA Shorts Fest	September 13, 2013	Best Animation	Won
New Hampshire Film Festival	October 20, 2013	Best Animation	Won
Seminci	October 26, 2013	Best European Short Film	Won
Savannah Film Festival	October 26, 2013	Best European Short Film	Won
Indie Memphis	November 3, 2013	Best Animation	Won
Cork Film Festival	November 17, 2013	The Grand Prix Irish	Won
Foyle Film Festival	October 24, 2013	Best Irish Animation	Won
Irish Film & Television Awards	April 5, 2014	Best Short Film	Nominated
Dallas International Film Festival	April 11, 2014	Best Short Animation	Won
San Francisco International Film Festival	May 8, 2014	Best Animated Short	Won
32nd Ale Kino! International Young Audience Film Festival	December 6, 2014	Special Mention by Youths' Jury for Short Movie for Youths	Won
27th European Film Awards	December 13, 2014	European Film Award for Best Short Film	Nominated
