= I'm Here =

I'm Here may refer to:

- Main Hoon Na or I'm Here, a 2004 Indian Hindi-language film by Farah Khan
- I'm Here (film), a 2010 film
- "I'm Here" (Charlie Major song)
- "I'm Here" (Yuna Ito song)
- "I'm Here", a song by Aly & AJ from Insomniatic
- "I'm Here", a song from The Color Purple (musical)
- "I'm Here", a song by Dolly Parton from I Believe in You
- "I'm Here", a song by Janet Jackson from Damita Jo
- I'm Here, an EP and its title song by The R.O.C. (rapper)
- "I'm Here", a song by Merry Kirk-Holmes and the main theme song of Sonic Frontiers
- “I’m Here”, a song from Matilda the Musical
- "I'm Here", by Frankie and Calvin from S Club 8, B-side of Dreaming

== See also ==
- I Am Here (disambiguation)
