= I Signed the Petition =

- Promotional poster
- Directed by: Mahdi Fleifel
- Release date: 2018
- Running time: 11 minutes
- Country: State of Palestine

I Signed the Petition is a Palestinian short documentary film with a duration of 11 minutes, directed by Mahdi Fleifel and produced in 2018. The film addresses a significant political issue from the director's personal experience, namely the solidarity with Palestinians through signing a petition calling for a cultural boycott of Israel.

== Plot ==
The film revolves around a phone call between the director and his friend after he signed a petition calling for a cultural boycott of Israel. This petition is related to the Boycott, Divestment and Sanctions (BDS) movement. The conversation reveals the psychological and social pressures individuals face when taking political stances. Through the call, Fleifel expresses his conflicting emotions and anxiety about the repercussions of this action on his professional and personal life.

== Awards and nominations ==
The film won the Best Short Documentary Award at the International Documentary Film Festival Amsterdam, and was nominated for European Film Award for Best Short Film at the 31st European Film Awards in 2018.

== Themes ==
The film aims to provide insight into the Israeli–Palestinian conflict, and raises questions about the meaning of solidarity and its actual impact on both personal and political levels. It discusses the internal and external tension felt by individuals who support justice causes, the effectiveness of the BDS movement in bringing real change, and the risks associated with it. The film concludes by emphasizing the psychological and social complexities of taking political stances, as many have to balance their personal convictions with the fear of consequences.
