= Eoin Duffy =

Irish animation director

- Born: 1983 (age 42–43); Tullow, Ireland
- Occupation: Film director

Eoin Duffy (1983, Tullow Ireland) is an Irish director of animation now living and working in Vancouver, British Columbia, Canada. Eoin has created a body of independent work that has gone on to secure multiple accolades including three Oscar accredited festival wins, a nomination for the 2014 European Film Awards a shortlisting for the 86th Academy Awards, and a nomination at the 5th Canadian Screen Awards. He also worked on some animated shorts for Arts x Radio by CBC Arts.

== Filmography ==
- On Departure (2012, 5 min)
- The Missing Scarf (2013, 6 min)
- I Am Here (2016)

== Accolades ==
Awards
Award	Date of ceremony	Category	Result	Ref.
Galway Film Fleadh	13 July 2013	The James Horgan Award for Best Animation	Won	
LA Shorts Fest	13 September 2013	Best Animation	Won	
New Hampshire Film Festival	20 October 2013	Best Animation	Won	
Seminci	26 October 2013	Best European Short Film	Won	
Savannah Film Festival	26 October 2013	Best European Short Film	Won	
Indie Memphis	3 November 2013	Best Animation	Won	
Cork Film Festival	17 November 2013	The Grand Prix Irish	Won	
Foyle Film Festival	24 October 2013	Best Irish Animation	Won	
Irish Film & Television Awards	5 April 2014	Best Short Film	Nominated	
Dallas International Film Festival	11 April 2014	Best Short Animation	Won	
San Francisco International Film Festival	8 May 2014	Best Animated Short	Won	
27th European Film Awards	2 December 2014	European Film Award for Best Short Film	Pending	
