= A Song Without Home =

2026 documentary film

- Georgian: სიმღერა სახლის გარეშე
- Directed by: Rati Tsiteladze
- Produced by: Olga Slusareva
- Starring: Adelina
- Cinematography: Rati Tsiteladze
- Edited by: Rati Tsiteladze
- Music by: Marius Leftărache
- Production company: ArtWay Film
- Release date: March 14, 2026 (CPH:DOX)
- Running time: 75 minutes
- Countries: Georgia; United States
- Languages: Georgian; German; English

A Song Without Home (Georgian: სიმღერა სახლის გარეშე) is a 2026 documentary film directed by Rati Tsiteladze and produced by Olga Slusareva. It follows Adelina as she flees years of confinement in rural Georgia and tries to build a new life in Austria.

The film had its world premiere at CPH:DOX in the DOX:AWARD main competition. It expands on Tsiteladze's 2018 short documentary Prisoner of Society, which was nominated for the European Film Awards.

== Synopsis ==
The film follows Adelina's journey from rural Georgia to Austria after years of isolation from the outside world. In Vienna, she starts to rebuild her life, pursues her aspirations as a dancer, and strives to live openly as herself. However, memories of past trauma and separation from her mother in Georgia continue to affect her new beginning.

== Release ==
A Song Without Home had its world premiere at CPH:DOX 2026, becoming the first Georgian documentary selected for the DOX:AWARD main competition, and was chosen by CPH:DOX as its nominee for the Doc Alliance Award for Best Feature Film. Its international premiere followed at the Thessaloniki International Documentary Festival in the Film Forward International Competition and the film received a Mermaid Award Honorable Mention.

It competed at DOK.fest München in the International Main Competition, Docaviv, Beldocs, and the Subversive Festival, as well as at Millennium Docs Against Gravity in the Amnesty International Competition.

The film was selected for IDFA's Best of Fests, nominated for the MDR Film Prize at DOK Leipzig, and selected for Ji.hlava International Documentary Film Festival and Doclisboa.

== Reception ==
In Filmmagasinet Ekko's critic panel, Murtada Elfadl of Variety described A Song Without Home as "visually arresting", underlining its meditative visual language and empathetic portrayal of a Georgian trans woman. Hannah Strong of Little White Lies described the film as an intimate portrait that was understated but deeply moving.

Vladan Petkovic of Cineuropa highlighted the film's impressionistic visuals, writing that "The film is as haunting as it is touching" and describing Tsiteladze's approach as "distinctly impressionistic". He also highlighted the use of sound design and music, describing them as "meticulously designed and ever-present" and as playing a decisive role in conveying the story and the protagonist's state of mind.

Melita Zajc of Modern Times Review described the film as an intimate story that speaks to all of humanity. She described Tsiteladze's direction as consistent and the film's visual language as pure and minimalist, writing that "Such remarkable use of cinematic language opens up a field of multiple interpretations".

Nicolas Bardot of Le Polyester noted the empathy of Tsiteladze's portrayal of Adelina, writing that the film presents her creation of a personal world as a form of solace in an increasingly inhumane society.

=== Awards ===
Date	Award	Category	Recipient(s)	Result	Ref.
2026	CPH:DOX	DOX:AWARD	A Song Without Home	Nominated	
2026	CPH:DOX	FIPRESCI Critics' Award	A Song Without Home	Nominated	
2026	Thessaloniki Documentary Festival	Film Forward Competition	A Song Without Home	Nominated	
2026	Thessaloniki Documentary Festival	Mermaid Award – Honorable Mention	A Song Without Home	Won	
2026	DOK.fest München	VIKTORIA DOK.international Main Competition	A Song Without Home	Nominated	
2026	Doc Alliance Awards	Best Feature Film	A Song Without Home	Nominated	
2026	Sofia DocuMental	Best International Human Rights Film	A Song Without Home	Won	
2026	Queer Wave	Best Documentary Feature - Audience Award	A Song Without Home	Won	
2026	DOK Leipzig	MDR Film Prize	A Song Without Home	Nominated	
