= Bergman: A Year in a Life =

Bergman - A Year in a Life
- Swedish: Bergman - ett år, ett liv
- Directed by: Jane Magnusson
- Written by: Jane Magnusson
- Produced by: Fredrik Heinig; Cecilia Nessen
- Cinematography: Emil Klang
- Edited by: Orvar Anklew; Hanna Lejonqvist; Kalle Lindberg
- Music by: Jonas Beckman; Lars Kumlin
- Production companies: B-Reel Feature Films; Sveriges Television AB - SVT; Filmpool Stockholm-Mälardalen
- Distributed by: Carlotta Films; Sherlock Films S.L.
- Release dates: 12 May 2018 (Cannes); 13 July 2018 (Sweden); 24 August 2018 (Norway)
- Running time: 117 minutes
- Countries: Sweden; Norway
- Languages: Swedish; English; German

Bergman: A Year in a Life, Swedish: Bergman - ett år, ett liv, is a 2018 Swedish-Norwegian documentary film directed by Jane Magnusson. Journeying through 1957, the year Ingmar Bergman released two of his most acclaimed features (The Seventh Seal and Wild Strawberries), made a TV film (Mr. Sleeman Is Coming) and directed four plays for theatre (The Misanthrope, Counterfeiters, The Prisoner, Peer Gynt), Magnusson has amassed a wealth of archive and contemporary interviews, along with a selection of clips from his vast body of work. The film premiered at the 71st Cannes Film Festival.

== Cast ==
- Ingmar Bergman as Himself (archive footage)
- Lena Endre as Herself
- Thorsten Flinck as Himself
- Elliott Gould as Himself
- Jane Magnusson as Narrator (voice)
- Barbra Streisand as Herself
- Liv Ullmann as Herself
- Lars von Trier as Himself
- Bibi Andersson as Sara (archive footage)
- Bengt Ekerot as Death (archive footage)
- Inga Landgré as Nelly (archive footage)
- Gösta Roosling as Himself (archive footage)
- Victor Sjöström as Dr. Eberhard Isak Borg (archive footage)
- Roy Andersson as Himself
- Dick Cavett as Himself
- Gösta Ekman as Himself
- Holly Hunter as Herself
- John Landis as Himself
- Gunnel Lindblom as Herself
- Jan Troell as Himself
- Yimou Zhang as Himself

== Awards and accolades ==
Date	Ceremony	Category	Recipient(s)	Result	Ref.
May 19, 2018	71st Cannes Film Festival	Golden Eye, The Documentary Prize	Bergman - A Year in a Life	Nominated	
September 29, 2018	66th San Sebastián International Film Festival	Zabaltegi-Tabakalera Prize	Bergman - A Year in a Life	Nominated	
December 15, 2018	31st European Film Awards	Best Documentary	Bergman - A Year in a Life	Won	
