= Dragan Mićanović =

Serbian actor (born 1970)

- Драган Мићановић
- Born: Dragan Mićanović; 30 September 1970 (age 55); Loznica, SR Serbia, SFR Yugoslavia
- Years active: 1989–present
- Spouse: Ana Sofrenović (before 2011)

Dragan Mićanović (Serbian: Драган Мићановић; born 30 September 1970) is a Serbian actor from Loznica who played in the films Layer Cake (2004), The White Countess (2005) and RocknRolla (2008). He played his first role abroad in Hamlet at the Globe Theatre.

== Personal life ==
Mićanović married to the Serbian actress Ana Sofrenović, and they have two daughters. The family lived in London but continued to work in Serbia and the Balkans. They divorced in November 2011.

== Filmography ==
Year	Title	Format	Role	Notes
1989	Sile u vazduhu	TV film	Lale	
1991	The Hottest Day of the Year	Film	Zoran	
1992	Zagreb-Beograd preko Sarajeva	TV film	Soldier	
1992	Teatar u Srba	TV series	Himself	
1993	Elektra	TV film		
1995	Tamna je noć	Film	Manojlo "Mane" Belezada	
1995	Ubistvo sa predumišljajem	Film	Jovan	
1997	Ljubav, ženidba i udadba	TV film	Vinko Lozić	
1997	Tango je tužna misao koja se pleše	Film		
1998	Lajanje na zvezde	Film	Mihajlo "Filozof" Knežević	
1999	Točkovi	Film	Nemanja	
2000	The Vice	TV series	Interpreter 2	
2001	Murder Rooms: Mysteries of the Real Sherlock Holmes	TV series	Coatley	
2002	Bad Company	Film	Michelle "The Hammer" Petrov	
2002	Auf Wiedersehen, Pet	TV series	Kadi	
2002	Ultimate Force	TV series	Ruslan	
2003	Cutting It	TV series	Vadim Stovchenko	
2003	Spooks	TV series	Radovan 'Rado' Petcovic	
2004	Smešne i druge priče	Mini Series	Konobar/Naum	
2004	Layer Cake	Film	Dragan	
2005	The White Countess	Film	Ilya	
2005	Položajnik	TV film	Joca	
2006	Krojačeva tajna	Film	Poručnik	
2007	Bora pod okupacijom	TV film	Mila Ogrizović	
2007	Dva	Film		
2007	Agi i Ema	Film	Dad	
2007–09	Ulica lipa	TV series	Nedeljko	
2008	Bližnji	TV film	Jakov	
2008	Londongrad	Short film	Konstantin Pilipenko	
2008	Casualty	TV series	Milosch Rabinovich	
2008	RocknRolla	Film	Victor	
2009	Ashes to Ashes	TV series	Tomascz	
2009	Motel Nana	Film	Ivan	
2009	Šišanje	Film	Maths professor	
2011	Coriolanus	Film	Titus	
2014	Mamula	Film	Boban	
2016	Uoči Božića	TV Drama	Panta	
2021	Hitman's Wife's Bodyguard	Film	Vlad	
2024	The Man Who Could Not Remain Silent (Čovjek koji nije mogao šutjeti)	Short film	Tomo Buzov	

== Serbian dubs ==
Year	Title	Role	Original
2006	Cars	Lightning McQueen	Owen Wilson
2007	The Simpsons Movie	President Arnold Schwarzenegger	Harry Shearer
2010	Megamind	Megamind	Will Ferrell
2011	Rio	Blu	Jesse Eisenberg
2011	Cars 2	Lightning McQueen	Owen Wilson
2012	Hotel Transylvania	Dracula	Adam Sandler
2013	Turbo	Guy Gagne	Bill Hader
2014	Rio 2	Blu	Jesse Eisenberg
2015	Hotel Transylvania 2	Dracula	Adam Sandler
2016	Moana	Chief Tui	Temuera Morrison
2017	Beauty and the Beast	Lumiere (speaking voice only)	Ewan McGregor
2017	Cars 3	Lightning McQueen	Owen Wilson
2018	Hotel Transylvania 3	Dracula	Adam Sandler

== Honours ==
- 2025 – Mićanović was appointed the jury member at the 31st Sarajevo Film Festival for Competition Programme – Feature Film.
