= The Man Who Could Not Remain Silent =

2024 short film by Nebojša Slijepčević

- Film poster
- Croatian: Čovjek koji nije mogao šutjeti
- Directed by: Nebojša Slijepčević
- Written by: Nebojša Slijepčević
- Based on: "Priča o Tomislavu Buzovu" by Boris Dežulović
- Produced by: Danijel Pek; Katarina Prpic; Noëlle Levenez; Katya Trichkova; Bostjan Virc
- Starring: Dragan Mićanović; Goran Bogdan; Alexis Manenti
- Cinematography: Gregor Bozic
- Edited by: Tomislav Stojanovic
- Production companies: Antitalent Produkcija; Les Films Norfolk; Contrast Films; Studio Virc
- Release date: May 2024 (Cannes)
- Running time: 13 minutes
- Countries: France; Croatia; Slovenia; Bulgaria
- Language: Croatian

The Man Who Could Not Remain Silent (Croatian: Čovjek koji nije mogao šutjeti) is a 2024 Croatian short drama film, written and directed by Nebojša Slijepčević. Shot at the Zagreb Glavni kolodvor, the film dramatizes the Štrpci massacre of 1993, when 18 Muslims and 1 Croat were pulled off a train by the Serbian White Eagles paramilitary group and massacred; it centres on Tomo Buzov (Dragan Mićanović), the sole non-Bosniak passenger on the train who tried to stand up against the attackers.

The film premiered at the 2024 Cannes Film Festival, where it was the winner of the Short Film Palme d'Or. It also won European Short Film at the 37th European Film Awards. It was nominated for Best Live Action Short Film at the 97th Academy Awards, becoming the first Croatian film to get nominated for an Academy Award in that category, and first Croatian film overall to get nominated for an Academy Award since the independence of Croatia. The film got selection at the 2nd Eikhoigi Imphal International Film Festival 2025 under the World Lenses section.

== Plot ==
The film depicts the true story of the kidnapping and crime in Štrpci (Bosnia and Herzegovina) on 27 February 1993, on a passenger train travelling from Belgrade to Bar, when the Beli Orlovi paramilitary unit dragged 24 Muslims from the train and executing them, before dumping their bodies in Perućac lake.

Dragan is a middle-aged man in a train car with several other passengers, including the teenage Milan, a grandfather and granddaughter, and a college student. The train stops unexpectedly, and the White Eagles are granted access to the train by the conductor. The soldiers force each passenger back into their seats and demand documentation and personal details from each. Many passengers are heard being forcefully dragged out. Milan admits to Dragan that he has no paperwork and that he will be arrested, but Dragan assures him that no one in the car will let anything happen to him.

However, when a commander enters the vehicle, Dragan fails to rebuff him and instead sits helplessly as the commander abuses Milan and orders him out of the train, falsely assuring him that he will quickly be returned. The other bystanders also sit quietly; however, the final passenger in the car, a Croat army veteran named Tomo Buzov, angrily confronts the commander and questions his authority. As Buzov willingly leaves the train to speak with the officer in charge, Milan is able to safely stay, and the train continues. Dragan watches Tomo's empty seat in silence.

The film ends with a tribute to Tomo Buzov, who was executed due to his attempt to stop the massacre.

== Cast ==
- Goran Bogdan as Dragan
- Alexis Manenti as commander of Beli Orlovi paramilitary
- Silvio Mumelaš as Milan
- Dragan Mićanović as Tomo Buzov
- Lara Nekić as student
- Priska Ugrina as granddaughter
- Dušan Gojić as grandfather
- Nebojša Pop Tasić as conductor
- Martin Kuhar as soldier
- Jakov Zovko as soldier
- Mijo Pavelko as passenger
- Robert Ugrina as passenger
- Damir Markovina voice
- Antonio Nuić voice

== Accolades ==
Year	Festival/Event	Award	Category	Result	Source
2024	Cannes Film Festival	Palme d'Or	Best Short Film	Won	
2024	Melbourne International Film Festival	Grand Prix City of Melbourne	Best Short Film	Won	
2024	AsterFest International Film	Aco Aleksov	Best Director	Won	
2024	FeKK – Ljubljana Short Film Festival	Special Recognition		Won	
2024	Festival slovenskega filma Portorož	Special Recognition for Cinematography		Won	
2024	Sulmona Film Festival	Ex Aequo	Best Actor	Won	
2024	Euro-Balkan Film Festival		Best Short Film	Won	
2024	Bucharest Short Film Festival	Best Cinematography		Won	
2024	Days of Croatian Film	Best Screenplay		Won	
2024	Days of Croatian Film	Award for Ethics and Human Rights		Won	
2024	Days of Croatian Film	Ex Aequo	Best Actor	Won	
2024	International Short Film Festival Winterthur	Audience Award		Won	
2024	European Film Academy	Prix Vimeo	European Short Film	Won	
2024	CinEast	Audience Award	Short Films	Won	
2025	97th Academy Awards	Best Live Action Short Film		Nominated	
