= Toz (film) =

Toz ("Dirt")
- Directed by: H. Fatih Kızılgök
- Written by: H. Fatih Kızılgök
- Produced by: Arda Topaloğlu
- Starring: Tatjiana Mul; Güçlü Yalçıner
- Cinematography: Robbie Ryan
- Edited by: H. Fatih Kızılgök
- Music by: Çağdaş Karagöz
- Release date: 2005
- Running time: 14 minutes
- Country: Turkey
- Language: Turkish

Toz (means "dust" in Turkish) is a Turkish short film. It gained a number of awards at various film festivals in the category of short films.

The film is a series of microepisodes that portray elements of an imperfect relationship of a couple: abuse, control, incomprehension, acceptance.

== Awards ==
- Corta! Porto International Short Film Festival, Portugal, International Competition: Best Film, 2005
- Istanbul Commerce University, National Competition: Best Film, 2005
- International Istanbul Short Film Days, National Competition: Special Jury Award, 2005
- Ankara International Film Festival, Turkey, National Competition: Second Place Award in Fiction, 2005
- !f Istanbul AFM Independent Film Festival, National Competition: Special Jury Award, 2005
- Akbank National Short Film Festival, National Competition: Jury Mention Award, 2004 (offline version)
- Columbia Tristar National Short Film Competition, Turkey: Best Film Award, 2004(offline version)
- European Film Academy Awards 2005 "Short Film Nominee”
- Fipresci Award
- Short Film - Prix UIP
