= Prisoner of Society (film) =

- Film poster
- სოციუმის პატიმარი
- Directed by: Rati Tsiteladze
- Produced by: Rati Tsiteladze; Nino Varsimashvili
- Starring: Adelina
- Cinematography: Rati Tsiteladze
- Edited by: Rati Tsiteladze
- Production company: ArtWay Film
- Release date: May 11, 2018 (Tampere Film Festival)
- Running time: 16 minutes
- Country: Georgia
- Language: Georgian

Prisoner of Society (Georgian: სოციუმის პატიმარი; Sociumis patimari) is a 2018 Georgian short documentary film directed by Rati Tsiteladze. It was nominated for the European Film Academy for Best Short Film at the 31st European Film Awards

In 2026, Tsiteladze expanded on the short with the feature-length film A Song Without Home, which premiered at CPH:DOX in the DOX:AWARD main competition.

== Critical reception ==
British Film Institute (BFI) called it "A provocative and confrontational" in Sight & Sound and named it among 10 short films to watch.

The film won Best Documentary Award and qualified for the 91st Academy Awards at Tampere FF where there jury called it "riveting intimate documentary that is important to discuss not only in Europe but throughout the world."

Seminci jury praised Tsiteladze's effective cinematographic mastery "the director overcomes his limitation of material resources to reflect with completeness of the complex history of life. The transgender protagonist is a prisoner of her body, of her parents, of society, of her own house, which reminds us that we are all prisoners of our prejudices and our ignorance.”

== Awards and nominations ==
Awards & nominations for Prisoner of Society
Year	Association	Award Category	Status
2018
2018	European Film Award	Best Short Film	Nominated
2018	Tampere Film Festival	Best Documentary (Oscar qualified)	Won
2018	Tampere Film Festival	Best European Short Film	Won
2018	Hong Kong International Film Festival	Golden Firebird Award	Nominated
2018	Seminci - Valladolid International Film Festival	Rainbow Spike (Special Mention)	Won
2018	Encounters Film Festival	Brief Encounters Grand Prix	Nominated
2018	Odense International Film Festival	Documentary Grand Prix	Won
2018	Melbourne International Film Festival	Grand Prix	Nominated
2018	Atlanta Film Festival	Best Documentary Short	Nominated
2018	Leeds International Film Festival	Queer Short Film - Special Mention	Won
2018	Uppsala International Short Film Festival	Grand Prix	Nominated
2018	Cyprus International Short Film Festival	Best Documentary	Won
2018	Cork Film Festival	Best Short	Nominated
2018	Internationale Kurzfilmtage Winterthur	Best Film	Nominated
2018	Galway Film Fleadh	Best Short Film	Nominated
2018	Tofifest	Special Mention	Won
2018	Rome Independent Film Festival	Best International Short Film	Nominated
