= I Am Here (film) =

2016 film directed by Eoin Duffy

- Directed by: Eoin Duffy
- Written by: Eoin Duffy
- Produced by: Maral Mohammadian; Shirley Vercruysse
- Starring: Nicholas Campbell
- Music by: Joseph Murray; Lodewijk Vos
- Production company: National Film Board of Canada
- Release date: October 2, 2016 (Vancouver)
- Running time: 5 minutes
- Country: Canada
- Language: English

I Am Here is a Canadian short animated film, directed by Eoin Duffy and released in 2016. The film relates the tale of an intrepid explorer (voiced by Nicholas Campbell) who has travelled the universe in search of ultimate meaning, only to discover that what he was looking for never really existed.

The film was a Canadian Screen Award nominee for Best Animated Short Film at the 5th Canadian Screen Awards.
