= Ági Pataki =

Hungarian film producer (born 1951)

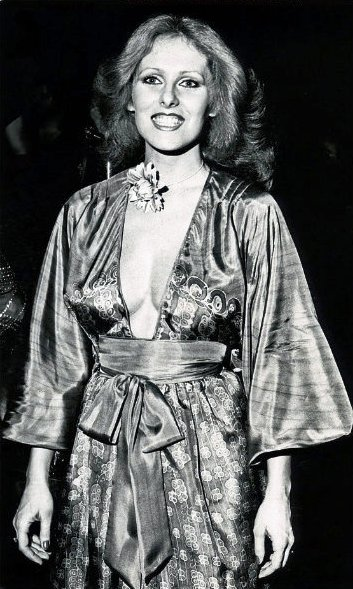
- Born: Ágnes Pataki; 5 September 1951 (age 75); Budapest, Hungary
- Occupations: Model; film producer; businesswoman
- Years active: 1970–present
- Known for: Poster model for Fabulon cosmetics; film production (Üvegtigris)
- Notable work: Üvegtigris film series

Ági Pataki (born Ágnes Pataki; 5 September 1951) is a Hungarian model and film producer. She was featured in posters for the Kőbánya Pharmaceuticals' Fabulon product line for about two decades. She also appeared in promotions for brands such as Pepsi, Philip Morris, L'Oréal Professionnel, and Semperit. In 2019, at age 67, she became the poster face of Helia-D's Cell Concept anti-wrinkle product line.

== Career ==
=== Early life ===
Before the 1956 Hungarian Revolution, Pataki's father was an officer in the country's military. After the revolution, he became an economic researcher. Her mother was an administrator at the Ministry of Health. Pataki spent her childhood in Budapest. After graduation, she worked as professional interpreter, having passed a German-Spanish tour guide exam.

=== Modeling ===
While escorting a tour group on a visit to a Budapest salon in the late 1960s, Pataki was discovered by the salon's owner who encouraged her to become a model. In 1970, a photograph of Pataki by Andrea Némeths was discovered by graphic designer József Finta, the PR director of Kőbánya Pharmaceuticals. She became the poster model for the company's Fabulon line of cosmetics throughout the 1970s and 1980s. Commenting on her modelling career with the company, Pataki said, "... I think I was more influenced by women than men. It is no coincidence that they chose the face of a female cosmetic. The specialist who picked me for this task was a woman looking for a face to target women... " Pataki also modeled in advertisements for several international products, working with photographers including János Fenyő, Gábor Modos and Miklós Lengyel.

In 2003 she appeared in Elle magazine. In 2014, she was Hungary's first "It Woman" in the L'Oréal Professionnel It Looks campaign. In 2015, 2016, and 2017 Forbes selected her as the 9th most influential Hungarian woman in culture.

=== Film producer and businesswoman ===
In the 1980s, Pataki became a businesswoman while still working as a model, opening a chain of three fashion boutiques. She is also in the real estate development business. By the 1990s, Pataki had become known as a film producer in Hungary. She and her husband, Gábor Kovács, one of the founders and directors of the joint venture Filmpartners, contributed greatly to the success of Hungarian films such as the Üvegtigris (Glass Tiger) films in 2001, 2006, and 2010. In 2003 she was named as one of the fifty most successful women In Hungary compiled by Magyar Hírlap.

In 2011 she became the founding managing director of the Independent Producers Association. In 2015, she was one of the five-member professional jury of the first incubator program announced by the Hungarian National Film Foundation, who will select ten film projects to help develop them. In 2016 she contributed to the making of the experimental photocopy film The Copyist, which debuted at the Palm Springs International Short-fest Animation Competition.
