= Andrea Occhipinti =

Italian actor and film producer

Andrea Occhipinti in 2026

Andrea Occhipinti (born 12 September 1957) is an Italian actor, film producer and distributor.

== Career ==
Occhipinti is the founder of Lucky Red, a Rome-based distribution company.

Since 1987, he has distributed and produced international independent films, introducing Italian audiences to directors from all over the world, such as Paolo Sorrentino, Alejandro Amenabar and Lars Von Trier.

From 2013 to 2018, Occhipinti served as president of the Italian film distributor association ANICA, and resigning from the role in September 2018 following a controversy surrounding distribution of the Alessio Cremonini film On My Skin.

In 2014, he received a David di Donatello Special Award for his commitment in theatrical distribution. In 2015 he has been awarded with the European Film Award for Best European Co-Producer and in 2019, Andrea won his second David di Donatello as Best Producer (for On my Skin).
