= Jure Pavlović =

Jure Pavlović (born Split, Croatia 1985) graduated with a degree in film and TV directing from the Academy of Dramatic Art in Zagreb, Croatia. He took part in various international workshops, including Berlinale Talents, Sarajevo Talent Campus, Sources 2, and MAIA.

Pavlović's short films Half an Hour for Grandma (2010) and Umbrella (2012) were shown at more than 50 festivals, winning 6 awards. His third short film, Picnic (2015), premiered at the 65th Berlinale Berlin International Film Festival in the Generation 14+ programme. It went on to win different awards, including the Grand Prize– Best Narrative Short at Flickers – Rhode Island Film Festival (and was RIFF’s official Oscar submission), Grand Prix – Best film at the 24th Croatian Film Days (national short & medium FF), Best Short Film – Ljubljana International Film Festival, and others. The film won the European Film Award (EFA) for the Best European short film in 2015.

As of 2015, Pavlović was in development of his debut feature shot under the working title Just Close Your Eyes (Samo zatvori oči) and released in 2019 as Matriarch (Mater).
