= Graduation '97 =

2017 short tragicomic film

- Ukrainian: Випуск ’97
- Directed by: Pavel Ostrikov
- Written by: Pavel Ostrikov
- Produced by: Yuriy Minzyanov
- Starring: Александр Пожарский; Олеся Островская; Людмила Саченко; Оксана Ильницкая; Виктор Лищинский
- Cinematography: Кирилл Шлямин
- Production company: Kristi Film
- Release dates: July 21, 2017 (Odesa International Film Festival); July 21, 2017 (Ukraine)
- Running time: 19 min.
- Country: Ukraine
- Language: Ukrainian

Graduation '97 (Ukrainian: «Випуск ’97», romanized: Vypusk'97) is a short Ukrainian tragicomedy film directed by Pavel Ostrikov. The world premier of the motion picture occurred on July 21, 2017, at the Odesa International Film Festival, where it received the prize for best Ukrainian short film.

The film was included in the almanac of short films, "Ukrainian New Wave: Runaway", which was released in Ukrainian theaters on April 12, 2018.

== Release ==
The world premier of Graduation '97 was on June 21, 2017, at the Odesa International Film Festival, where it received the prize for best Ukrainian short film. On August 3 of the same year the picture was shown at the Locarno Festival under the English name Graduation '97, where it also won the prize from the Youth jury for best international short film.

== Plot summary ==
Roman, a technician, lives a solitary life in a provincial town. For the first time in a while, since his degree, he runs into an old classmate, Liuda, who just returned to the town. No one had heard talk of her for twenty years and Roman does not want to lose her again.

== Links ==
- Выпуск ’97 at IMDb
