= Mahdi Fleifel =

Danish-Palestinian film director

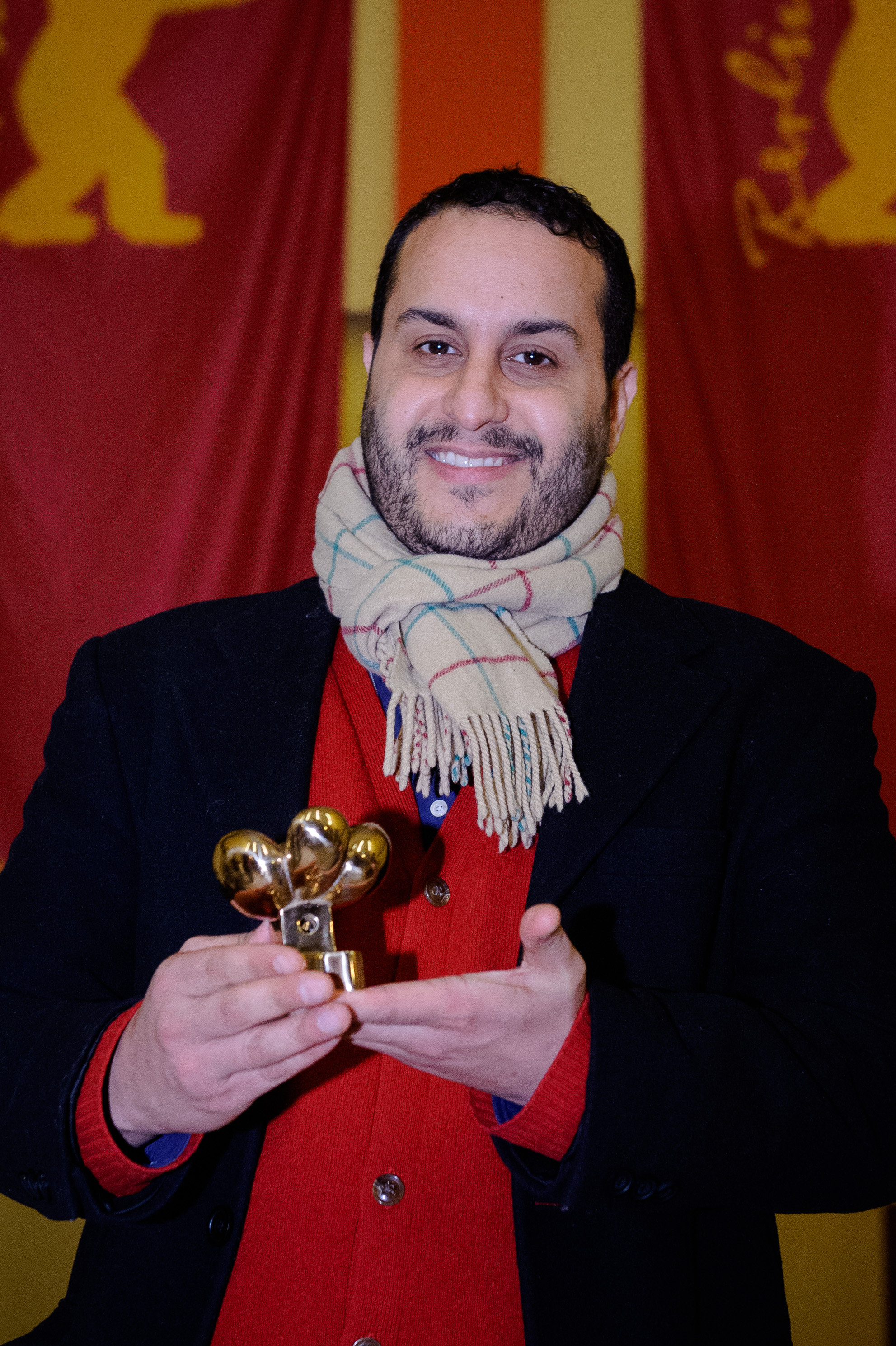
- Mahdi Fleifel in 2013
- Born: Dubai
- Citizenship: Danish
- Education: National Film and Television School at Beaconsfield, Buckinghamshire
- Occupation: Filmmaker
- Years active: 2003 – present
- Website: https://nakbafilmworks.com

Mahdi Fleifel (born 25 October 1979 at Dubai) is a Danish-Palestinian film director. Often examining themes of social injustice, Fleifel's films largely convey the struggles of Palestinians in exile.

== Biography ==
Mahdi Fleifel was raised in the refugee camp Ein el-Helweh in Lebanon and later in a suburb of Helsingør in Denmark. In 2009, he graduated from the National Film and Television School at Beaconsfield, Buckinghamshire. In 2010, he set up the London-based production company Nakba FilmWorks.

His debut feature documentary, A World Not Ours, picked up several awards. His short film, A Man Returned, won the Silver Bear and the European Film Nomination at the Berlinale and his film, A Drowning Man, was in the Official Selection at the Cannes Film Festival 2017.

== Filmography ==
Year	Title	Notes
2012	A World Not Ours (Alam laysa lana)	Feature film
2014	Xenos	Short film
2015	20 Handshakes for Peace	Short film
2016	A Man Returned	Short film
2017	A Drowning Man	Short film
2018	I Signed the Petition	Short film
2020	3 Logical Exits	Short film
2023	Elefsina Notre Amour	Short film
2024	To a Land Unknown	Feature film
