= 27th European Film Awards =

2014 film awards ceremony in Latvia

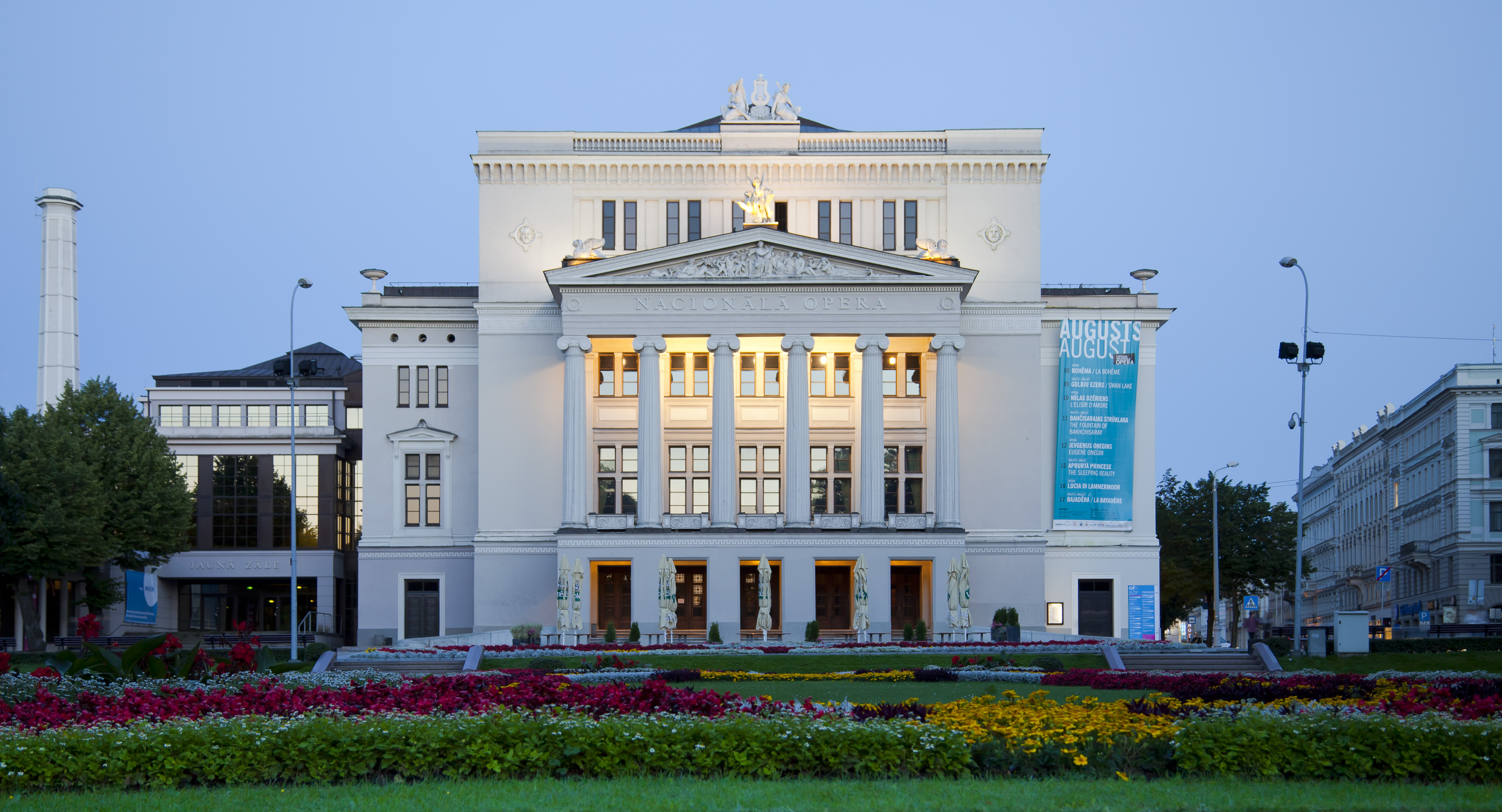
- Latvian National Opera
- Date: 13 December 2014
- Site: Latvian National Opera, Riga, Latvia
- Hosted by: Thomas Hermanns
- Produced by: Marion Döring and Jürgen Biesinger
- Organized by: European Film Academy

Highlights
- Best Film: Ida
- Best Director: Paweł Pawlikowski
- Best Actor: Timothy Spall
- Best Actress: Marion Cotillard
- Most awards: Ida (5)
- Most nominations: Ida (7)

Television coverage
- Channel: Arte

The 27th European Film Awards were presented on 13 December 2014 in Riga, Latvia. The winners were selected by more than 2,500 members of the European Film Academy. Nominations for the People's Choice Award category were announced on 1 September 2014. On 16 September 2014, the European Film Academy and EFA Productions announced a list of 50 films which qualified for nominations. All nominations were announced on 8 November 2014 at the Seville European Film Festival in Spain. British director Steve McQueen was presented with the European Achievement in World Cinema Award and filmmaker Agnès Varda was honoured with the Lifetime Achievement Award.

== Winners and nominees ==
=== Best Film ===
English title	Original title	Director(s)	Production country
Ida		Paweł Pawlikowski	(Poland) (Denmark)
Force Majeure	Turist	Ruben Östlund	(Sweden) (France) (Norway) (Denmark)
Leviathan	Левиафан	Andrey Zvyagintsev	(Russia)
Nymphomaniac - Director's Cut		Lars von Trier	(Denmark) (Belgium) (France) (Germany)
Winter Sleep	Kış Uykusu	Nuri Bilge Ceylan	(Turkey)

=== Best Director ===
Director(s)	English title	Original title
(Poland) Paweł Pawlikowski	Ida	
(Turkey) Nuri Bilge Ceylan	Winter Sleep	Kış Uykusu
(United Kingdom) Steven Knight	Locke	
(Sweden) Ruben Östlund	Force Majeure	Turist
(Italy) Paolo Virzì	Human Capital	Il capitale umano
(Russia) Andrey Zvyagintsev	Leviathan	Левиафан

=== Best Screenwriter ===
Screenwriter(s)	Nationality	English title	Original title
Paweł Pawlikowski, Rebecca Lenkiewicz	Poland	Ida	
Ebru Ceylan, Nuri Bilge Ceylan	Turkey	Winter Sleep	Kış Uykusu
Jean-Pierre Dardenne, Luc Dardenne	Belgium	Two Days, One Night	Deux jours, une nuit
Steven Knight	United Kingdom	Locke	
Oleg Negin, Andrey Zvyagintsev	Russia	Leviathan	Левиафан

=== Best European Actor ===
Actor	English title	Original title
(United Kingdom) Timothy Spall	Mr. Turner	Mr. Turner
(Republic of Ireland) Brendan Gleeson	Calvary	Calvary
(United Kingdom) Tom Hardy	Locke	Locke
(Russia) Aleksei Serebryakov	Leviathan	Левиафан
(Sweden) Stellan Skarsgård	Nymphomaniac	Nymphomaniac

=== Best European Actress ===
Actress	English title	Original title
(France) Marion Cotillard	Two Days, One Night	Deux jours, une nuit
(Spain) Marian Álvarez	Wounded	La herida
(Italy) (France) Valeria Bruni Tedeschi	Human Capital	Il capitale umano
(United Kingdom) (France) Charlotte Gainsbourg	Nymphomaniac	Nymphomaniac
(Poland) Agata Kulesza	Ida	Ida
(Poland) Agata Trzebuchowska	Ida	Ida

=== Best Comedy ===
English title	Original title	Director(s)	Production country
The Mafia Kills Only in the Summer	La mafia uccide solo d'estate	Pierfrancesco Diliberto	(Italy)
Carmina & Amen	Carmina y amén	Paco León	(Spain)
Le Week-End		Roger Michell	(United Kingdom) (France)

=== People's Choice Award for Best European Film ===
English title	Original title	Director(s)	Writers(s)	Production country
Ida		Paweł Pawlikowski	Rebecca Lenkiewicz, Paweł Pawlikowski	(Poland) (Denmark)
Beauty and the Beast	La Belle et la Bête	Christophe Gans	Christophe Gans, Sandra Vo-Anh	(France) (Germany)
Nymphomaniac		Lars von Trier	Lars von Trier	(Denmark) (Belgium) (France) (Germany)
Philomena		Stephen Frears	Steve Coogan, Jeff Pope	(United Kingdom)
The Hundred-Year-Old Man Who Climbed Out the Window and Disappeared	Hundraåringen som klev ut genom fönstret och försvann	Felix Herngren	Felix Herngren, Hans Ingemansson, Jonas Jonasson	(Sweden)
Two Days, One Night	Deux jours, une nuit	Luc Dardenne, Jean-Pierre Dardenne	Luc Dardenne, Jean-Pierre Dardenne	(Belgium) (France) (Italy)

=== Discovery of the Year ===
English title	Original title	Director(s)	Writers(s)	Production country
The Tribe	Плем'я (Plemya)	Myroslav Slaboshpytskiy	Myroslav Slaboshpytskiy	(Ukraine)
10,000 km		Carlos Marques-Marcet	Carlos Marques-Marcet, Clara Roquet	(Spain)
'71		Yann Demange	Gregory Burke	(United Kingdom)
Party Girl		Marie Amachoukeli, Claire Burger, Samuel Theis	Samuel Theis, Claire Burger, Marie Amachoukeli	(France)
Wounded	La herida	Fernando Franco	Fernando Franco, Enric Rufas	(Spain)

=== Best Animated Feature Film ===
The nominees were announced on 22 September 2014.

English title	Original title	Director(s)	Animation	Production country
The Art of Happiness	L'arte della felicità	Alessandro Rak	Alessandro Rak, Ivan Cappiello, Dario Sansone, Marino Guarnieri, Annarita Calligaris, Ivana Verze, Laura Sammati, Antonia Emanuela Angrisani, Corrado Piscitelli, Flavio Di Biase, Giorgio Siravo, Sergio Chimenti, Ilaria Jones, Antonio Funaro, Danilo Florio, Mirko Prota, Alberto Panico, Paolo Acampora, Marco Iannaccone	(Italy)
Jack and the Cuckoo-Clock Heart	Jack et la mécanique du cœur	Stéphane Berla, Mathias Malzieu	Nicolette Ceccoli, Stéphane Martine, Robert Cepo	(France) (Belgium)
Minuscule: Valley of the Lost Ants	Minuscule - La vallée des fourmis perdues	Hélène Giraud, Thomas Szabo		(France) (Belgium)

=== Best Documentary ===
English title	Original title	Director(s)	Production country
Master of the Universe		Marc Bauder	(Germany) (Austria)
Just the Right Amount of Violence		Jon Bang Carlsen	(Denmark)
Of Men and War	Des hommes et de la guerre	Laurent Bécue-Renard	(France) (Switzerland)
Sacro GRA		Gianfranco Rosi	(Italy) (France)
Waiting For August		Teodora Ana Mihai	(Belgium) (Romania)
We Come as Friends		Hubert Sauper	(Austria) (France)

=== Best Cinematographer ===
English title	Original title	Winner(s)	Nationality
Ida		Łukasz Żal and Ryszard Lenczewski	(Poland)

=== Best Editor ===
English title	Original title	Winner(s)	Nationality
Locke		Justine Wright	(United Kingdom)

=== Best Production Designer ===
English title	Original title	Winner(s)	Nationality
The Dark Valley	Das finstere Tal	Claus-Rudolf Amler	(Germany)

=== Best Costume Designer ===
English title	Original title	Winner(s)	Nationality
The Dark Valley	Das finstere Tal	Natascha Curtius-Noss	(Germany)

=== Best Composer ===
English title	Original title	Winner(s)	Nationality
Under the Skin		Mica Levi	(United Kingdom)

=== Best Sound Designer ===
English title	Original title	Winner(s)	Nationality
Starred Up		Joakim Sundström	(Sweden)

=== European Co-Production Award—Prix Eurimages ===
Recipient	Occupation	Nationality
Ed Guiney	Producer	(Republic of Ireland)

=== European Achievement in World Cinema ===
Recipient	Occupation	Nationality
Steve McQueen	Director and screenwriter	(United Kingdom)

=== Lifetime Achievement Award ===
Recipient	Occupation	Nationality
Agnès Varda	Director and screenwriter	(France)

=== Best Short Film ===
The nominees for Best Short Film were selected by independent juries at a series of film festivals throughout Europe.

English title	Original title	Director(s)	Country	Nominating Festival
The Chicken		Una Gunjak	(Germany) (Croatia)	Encounters Short Film and Animation Festival
Emergency Calls	Hätäkutsu	Hannes Vartiainen, Pekka Veikkolainen	(Finland)	Sarajevo Film Festival
Shipwreck		Morgan Knibbe	(Netherlands)	Locarno Film Festival
A Town Called Panic: The Christmas Log	Panique au Village: La Bûche de Noël	Vincent Patar, Stéphane Aubier	(Belgium) (France)	Vila do Conde Film Festival
Dinola	დინოლა	Mariam Khatchvani	(Georgia (country))	Grimstad Film Festival
Summer 2014	Lato 2014	Wojciech Sobczyk	(Poland)	Kraków Film Festival
Wall	Fal	Simon Szabó	(Hungary)	Tampere Film Festival
Taprobana		Gabriel Abrantes	(Portugal) (Sri Lanka) (Denmark)	Berlin International Film Festival
Pride		Pavel Vesnakov	(Bulgaria) (Germany)	Clermont-Ferrand International Short Film Festival
The Chimera of M.		Sebastian Buerkner	(United Kingdom)	International Film Festival Rotterdam
Little Block of Cement with Disheveled Hair Containing the Sea	Pequeño bloque de cemento con pelo alborotado conteniendo el mar	Jorge Lopez Navarette	(Spain)	Cork Film Festival
The Missing Scarf		Eoin Duffy	(Republic of Ireland)	Valladolid International Film Festival
Whale Valley	Hvalfjörður	Guðmundur Arnar Guðmundsson	(Denmark) (Iceland)	Flanders International Film Festival Ghent
Daily Bread	פת לחם	Idan Hubel	(Israel)	Venice Film Festival
Still Got Lives	Ich hab noch Auferstehung	Jan-Gerrit Seyler	(Germany)	Drama International Short Film Festival

=== Young Audience Award ===
Twelve- to fourteen-year-old audiences from across Europe voted for the winner after watching the three nominated films at special screenings held on "Young Audience Film Day".

English title	Original title	Director(s)	Writers(s)	Production country
Regret!	Spijt!	Dave Schram	Maria Peters, Dick van den Heuvel	(Netherlands)
The Contest: To the Stars and Back	MGP missionen	Martin Miehe-Renard	Gitte Løkkegaard, Martin Miehe-Renard	(Denmark)
Windstorm	Ostwind - Zusammen sind wir frei	Katja von Garnier	Kristina Magdalena Henn, Lea Schmidbauer	(Germany)
