= Nebojša Slijepčević =

Croatian film director and screenwriter

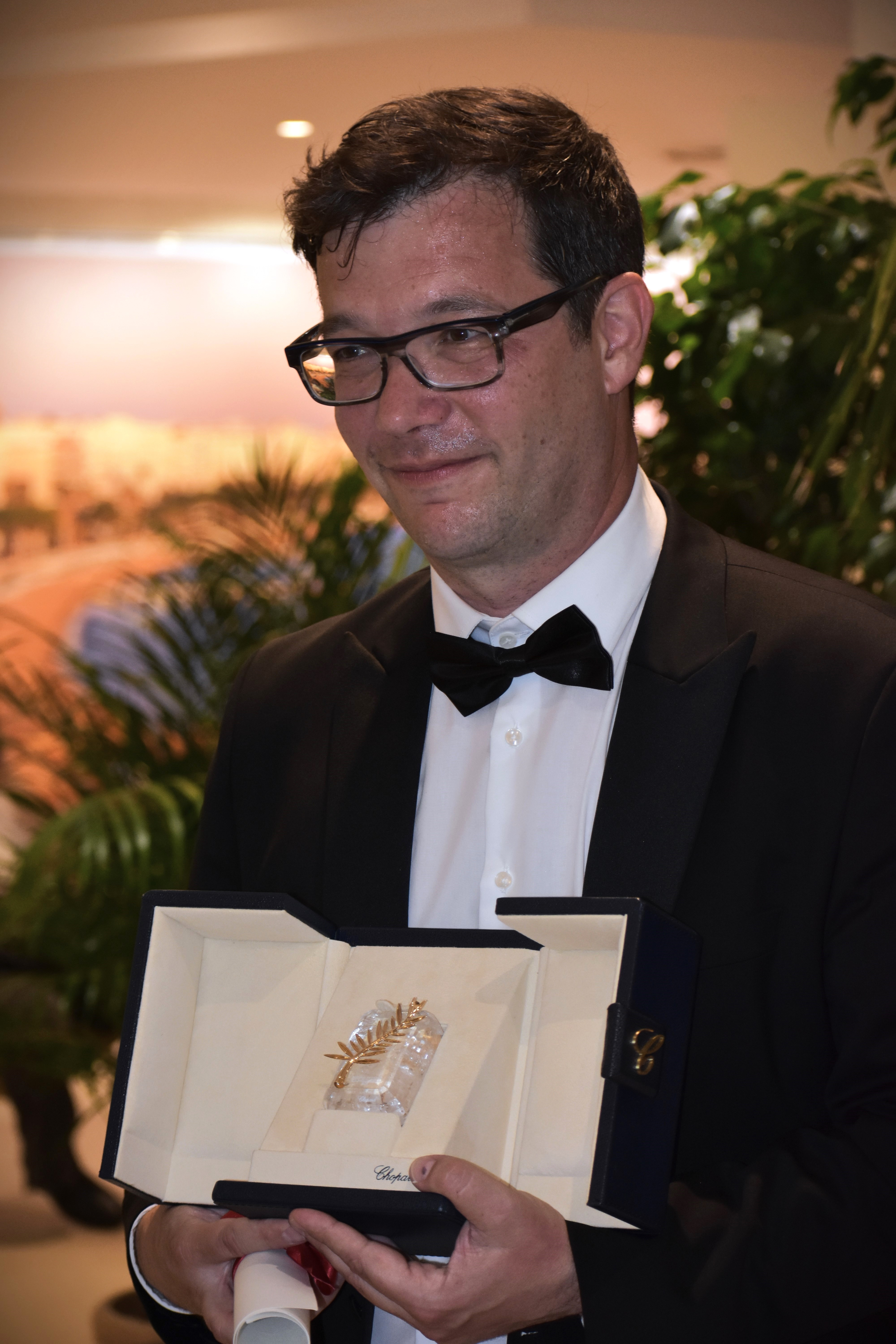
- Slijepčević at 2024 Cannes Film Festival
- Occupation(s): Film director, screenwriter
- Children: 1 (Note: The quote "The Croatian director also finished his speech in Croatian, addressing his wife and son at home", confirmes that Slijepčević has one child)

Nebojša Slijepčević is a Croatian film director and screenwriter. He was nominated for an Academy Award in the category Best Live Action Short Film for the film The Man Who Could Not Remain Silent.

At the 50th César Awards, he won a César Award for Best Fiction Short Film. His win was shared with Noëlle Levenez.

== Selected filmography ==
- The Man Who Could Not Remain Silent (2024)
