= Middle Duo =

1998 one-act ballet, Mariinsky Theater, Russia

The Middle Duo
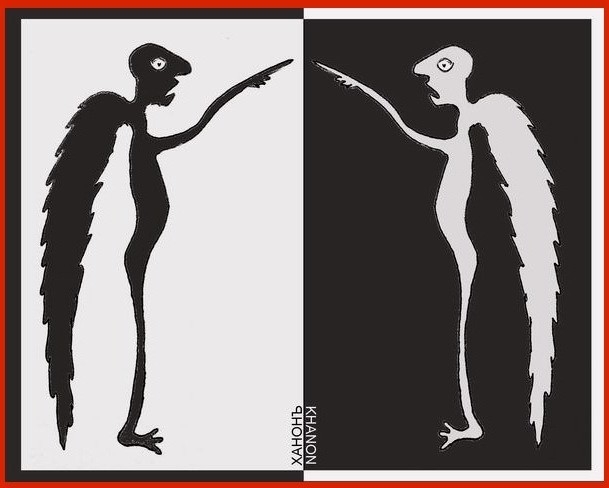
- Choreographer: Alexei Ratmansky
- Music: Yuri Khanon
- Premiere: November 24, 1998; Mariinsky Theatre
- Genre: neoclassical ballet

The Middle Duo (Middle Duet) (choreographer Alexei Ratmansky, composer Yuri Khanon) — is a one-act ballet staged at the Mariinsky Theater in November 1998 to the music of the first movement of the Middle Symphony. The ten-minute production became Ratmansky's debut as a choreographer at the Mariinsky Theater.

In 2000, the Middle Duet received a Golden Mask Award nomination in the “best ballet” category. After his appointment as chief choreographer of the Bolshoi Theater, Ratmansky transferred “The Middle Duet” to this stage, and then to the New York City Ballet (2006). Two or three years after the premiere, “The Middle Duet” became a kind of calling card for Ratmansky as a choreographer and followed him on all the stages on which he worked, and then was included in the program of the farewell concert “Ratmansky Gala” on the New Stage of the Bolshoi Theater before his leaving the post of chief choreographer and moving to New York.

In addition to the theatrical version with scenery and orchestra, for ten years the Middle Duet was shown around the world as a concert number, not only on theater tours, but also in numerous enterprises, earning a reputation as one of the best one-act ballets in Russia at the beginning of the 21st century.

From the moment the ballet was staged at the Mariinsky Theater until the last performance, music was used in the ballet without drawing up a contract. As a result of systematic violation of the composer's copyright and counterfeit use of music, in 2010 “Middle Duet” was banned from performance and removed from all stages.

== History of creation ==
The Mariinsky Theater commissioned Alexei Ratmansky to stage an evening of new one-act ballets in the spring of 1998. By that time, Ratmansky, being a soloist of the Royal Danish Ballet in Copenhagen, was already the choreographer of six small productions (in Kyiv, Winnipeg and Moscow). Ratmansky staged the last two ballet numbers (Capriccio to the music of Stravinsky and Dreams of Japan to the music of the Kodo group) at the Bolshoi Theater (1997–1998).

Ratmansky wrote about his desire to stage a modern ballet to beautiful modern music:

...among contemporary composers, I remembered the St. Petersburger Yuri Khanon, who several years ago amazed everyone with his music for Alexander Sokurov’s film “Days of Eclipse”. After a long search, I found his only disc in Copenhagen. The music turned out to be conceptual, theatrical, melancholy and rhythmic. The feeling of “looking from the outside” gave rise to the idea of two creatures with wings, which, although not formally participating in the action, are still the main characters of this little ballet. Unfortunately, for now I am using only one part of his wonderful “Middle Symphony”, but I am not giving up hope of staging the entire symphony.

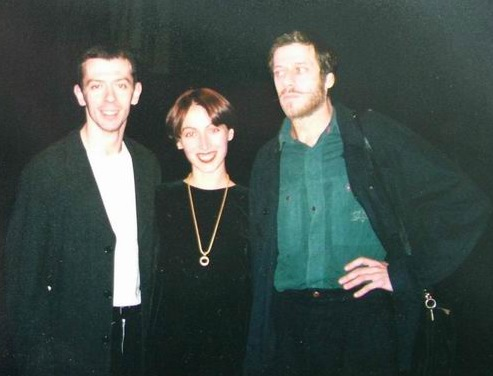
Alexei and Tatiana Ratmansky with Yuri Khanon, The Middle Duo, Mariinsky theatre, 24 November 1998

However, at first the composer refused Ratmansky's offer, citing his reluctance to deal with the state theater. And only after two months of negotiations he agreed on the condition that Ratmansky would undertake all negotiations with the theater. In the booklet dedicated to the premiere of the ballet, Ratmansky himself recalled several times that preliminary negotiations about the production were very difficult. And even the headline of his announcement of the Middle Duo had the following title: “To persuade Khanon was not easy”.

In turn, the author of the music considered it an undoubted coincidence that his name appeared on the poster of the Mariinsky Theater. Without bothering himself at all with his career and communicating with professionals, Yuri Khanon has long and firmly moved into the internal underground.

The premiere of “The Middle Duet” took place on November 24–25, 1998 and was a great success. Ironically, the day of the premiere coincided with the mourning declared on the occasion of the murder of Galina Starovoytova and at the very beginning of the performance, before the opening of the “Evening of New Ballets”, a minute of silence was announced. Of the three ballets shown that evening, two years later only the Middle Duet remained in the repertoire.

== Subsequent history ==
From the very first show, “The Middle Duet” was a great success not only with the public, but above all with the ballet dancers. Having at their disposal the phonogram of the first part of the “Middle Symphony” (taken from the Olympia CD), many soloists of the Mariinsky, and after them of other theaters, began to perform the “Middle Duet” in numerous enterprises and concerts. The concert performance of this number took place without decorations and with a reduced cast of performers.

In 2000, “Middle Duet” received a Golden Mask Award nomination in the ballet performance category. A special screening took place on March 13, 2000, in the theater Stanislavsky and Nemirovich-Danchenko

Last year’s “Mask” laureate Alexei Ratmansky showed his best work – “Middle Duet” to Khanon’s music. The choreography of “Duet” — dynamic, intense, integral, in vocabulary in no way inferior to world standards — became a real discovery. The advantage of Ratmansky as a choreographer seemed obvious.

Thanks to its success and widespread distribution, "The Middle Duet" gradually became the most famous ballet number staged by Ratmansky and acquired the status of a kind of calling card, representing the best example of the young choreographer's work. When touring in Moscow, the Mariinsky Theater always attached the Middle Duet to its premieres as a win-win “bonus”. Reviewers noted that against the backdrop of museum monster ballets, Ratmansky′s minimalist masterpiece is pure exclusive: “in the attire of the Mariinsky Theater, this number looks like a Givenchy dress among the rags of a flea market”.

The “Middle Duet” was a particular success with the public. An original production by 33-year-old dancer and choreographer Alexei Ratmansky to the music of contemporary composer Yuri Khanon immerses the audience in a gloomy world, where a mysterious duet comes to life in a ray of light: to the sounds of a piano and orchestra, the partner, with pulsating gestures, tries to hold his partner, who continuously moves on pointe shoes, weaving a complex a web of sharp and sensual steps. This is the only modern miniature that graced the two-act performance...

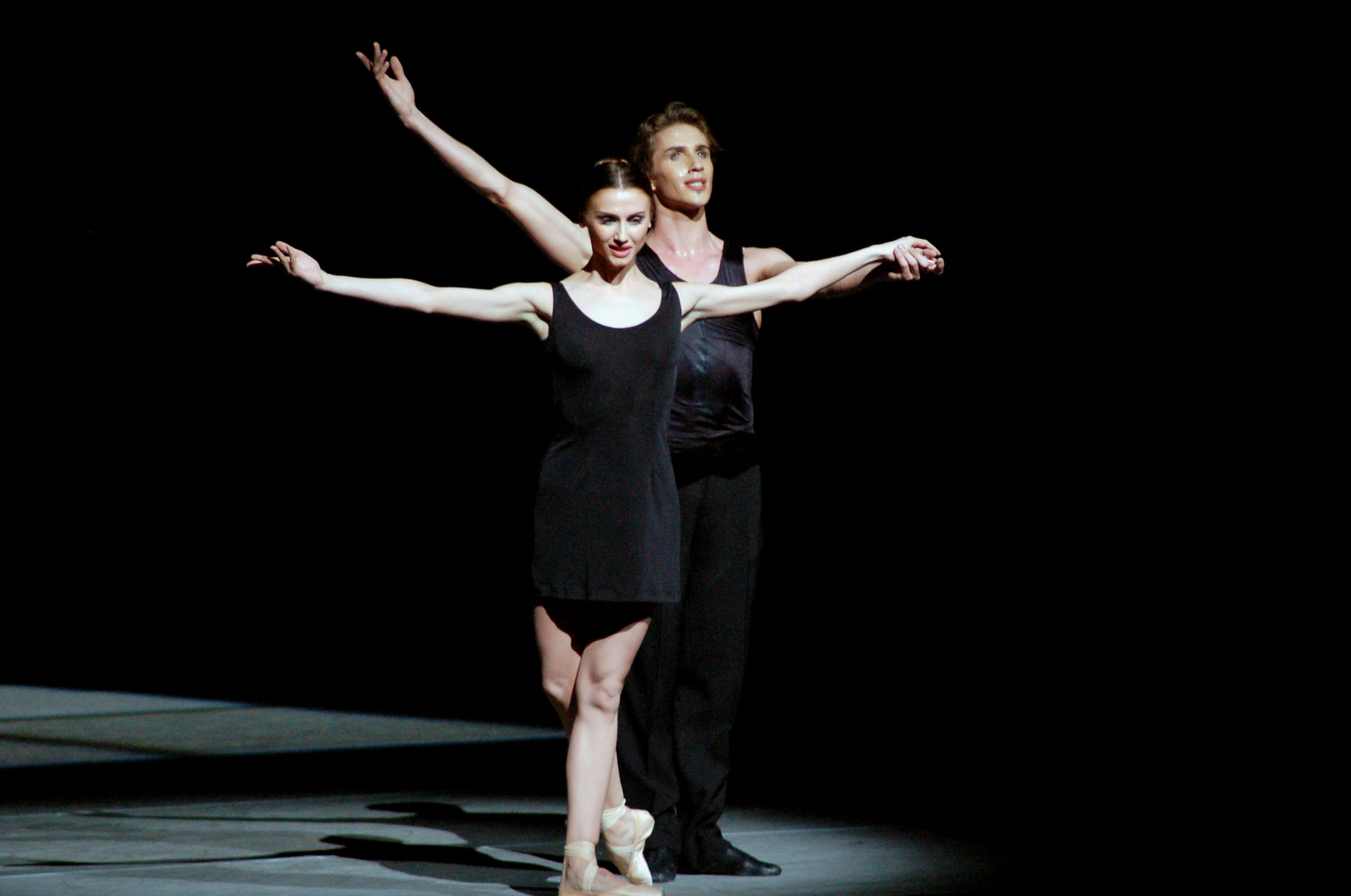
Svetlana Zakharova and Andrei Merkuryev, The Middle Duo, 2006

Many soloists from major ballet companies have included this virtuoso number in their repertoire and often performed it in concert programs. Over the ten years of the ballet's existence, dozens of soloists have performed it, including Svetlana Zakharova, Andrei Merkuryev, Diana Vishneva, Natalia Osipova, Zhanna Ayupova, Igor Kolb, Olesya Novikova, Daria Pavlenko, Evgeniy Golovin, Mikhail Zarubin, Alexey Loparevich and “ even" Alexei Ratmansky himself (as a dancer). In Europe and the USA the Middle Duet danced: Maria Kowroski, Albert Evans, Rebecca Krohn, Amar Ramasar, Adrian Danchig-Waring, Jonathan Stafford.

After the music for the film “Days of Eclipse”, which received a European Film Awards in 1988, the first movement of the “Middle Symphony” became Yuri Khanon's second most famous work. The composer Boris Yoffe writes: “The movement alone, taken out of context, in which an indefinite baroque model (between the famous Albinoni forgery and the slow movements from Bach's instrumental concertos) is tied into an infinite, diverging and yet maintaining loop, allows Khanon to be counted among the leading composers of postmodernism, the most virtuoso masters of destruction, alienation and minimalism.

After his appointment as chief choreographer at the Bolshoi Theater, Alexei Ratmansky almost immediately transferred the ballet act to the main stage of the country. The next premiere (performed by Svetlana Zakharova) took place on January 22, 2006. In addition to the enterprise, “The Middle Duet” became one of the regular visiting performances of the Mariinsky (and then the Bolshoi) theater and was performed on almost all the significant foreign tours of the ballet troupe. The world maximum of popularity of the “Middle Duet” occurred in 2006–2008, when the number of performances of the ballet miniature exceeded a hundred in the largest cities of Europe and around the world. In the fall of 2006, Ratmansky also moved the production to the stage of the New York City Ballet.

It was at this moment, after almost ten years of silence, that the composer of “The Middle Duet” first recalled himself and asked the question: why, since 1998, his work has been used by the largest theaters and enterprises of the country (and the world) with complete disregard for the author? Neither the Mariinsky, nor the Bolshoi, nor any other theater even thought of obtaining the consent of the author of the music, concluding a contract with him and completing all other elementary formalities. Thus, for almost ten years, the most common piracy took place on the part of the theaters. Pre-trial negotiations between the theaters and the author's lawyers took place in an insulting tone, did not lead to any results and very soon reached a dead end. In 2009, the author was forced to ban the public performance of the “Middle Duet”. He personally blamed Alexei Ratmansky for this result, who failed to fulfill his initial promise and did not keep his word of honor.
