= Sentimental Value (soundtrack) =

Film score by Hania Rani
- Released: 6 February 2026
- Recorded: 2024–2025
- Genre: Film score; acoustic; ambient
- Length: 38:29
- Label: Gondwana Records
- Producer: Hania Rani

Hania Rani chronology
Non Fiction – Piano Concerto in Four Movements (2025)	Sentimental Value (2026)

Sentimental Value is the film score composed by Hania Rani to the 2026 film Sentimental Value directed by Joachim Trier starring Renate Reinsve, Inga Ibsdotter Lilleaas, Stellan Skarsgård and Elle Fanning. The score was released through Gondwana Records on 6 February 2026.

== Development ==
Joachim Trier hired composer Hania Rani to score Sentimental Value in her first film scoring stint, after having listened to her studio albums and felt that she had a "sensitivity to vulnerability". Trier briefed that Rani had to approach the score in a complex manner eschewing the sentiments by levitating the darker and melancholic moments. She found working with Trier had her an access to the "most intimate moments of the director's own relationship with the body of work" observing his filmmaking stint and found it "simply fascinating" as he was not limited to filmmaking but it reaches further and further.

The composer scored Sentimental Value without having an edit, and only the script was provided to her. Rani found this suitable for her as she wasn't immune to the functionality of film music, and liked to ponder sounds in separation from the image and helps in fabricating more abstract sequences which are not expressed in the film and provide a new context. He considered the elusive, melancholic nature of the film and its relationship dynamics being the challenge. The subtlety of the relationships became a recurring topic whenever Trier and Rani had a discussion about the music. Instead of directly imposing that, Rani decided to impure the sound with a succession of small sonic gestures through rearrangements, reorchestration, revisiting, extending the duration or recording in a new acoustic environment. The mediated sounds and expressions allowed her to model a soundscape that transcends from the older and the newer.

In September 2024, Rani and the sound engineer Agata Dankowska went to Oslo spending a couple of days in the main filming location, which was "the family home". The crew was away in France to film another scene which provided her an opportunity to freely explore the space visually and sonically; she created field recordings from the sounds of objects and furniture as well as recording few piano pieces and the house itself is a significant part in the story. She felt like exploring the interiors of the house reminded her of knowing her a real person and thus provided a far more intimate layer of the film that informed her composing style. Much of Rani's recordings were not included in the soundtrack.

== Release ==
While the film's theatrical release happened in 2025, the score album had a delayed release. It was published by Gondwana Records on 6 February 2026 in digital formats while a vinyl edition is scheduled to be released on 22 May 2026.

== Reception ==
Tim Grierson of Screen International wrote "Hania Rani's wistful, spare score brings to life the sadness at the root of this family, even if some of Sentimental Value's revelations are easy to predict." Luke Hicks of The Film Stage called it "a weightless score from Hania Rani". David Rooney of The Hollywood Reporter called the score "whimsical", while Peter Debruge of Variety called it "melancholic".

== Track listing ==
No.	Title	Length
1.	"Sentimental Value"	4:47
2.	"The House"	2:50
3.	"Childlike"	2:39
4.	"Lighter and Lighter"	1:57
5.	"Riksarkivet"	3:18
6.	"Agnes"	3:15
7.	"Rachel"	5:36
8.	"Speaking to the Past"	2:19
9.	"Gustav"	6:57
10.	"Nora"	4:51
Total length:		38:29

== Charts ==
Chart performance for Sentimental Value
Chart (2026)	Peak position
Scottish Albums (Official Charts)	88
UK Albums Sales (OCC)	68
UK Classical Albums (OCC)	2
UK Independent Albums (Official Charts)	25
UK Soundtrack Albums (Official Charts)	2

== Accolades ==
Award	Date of ceremony	Category	Recipient(s)	Result	Ref.
European Film Awards	17 January 2026	Best Composer	Hania Rani	Won	
