= Yuri Khanon =

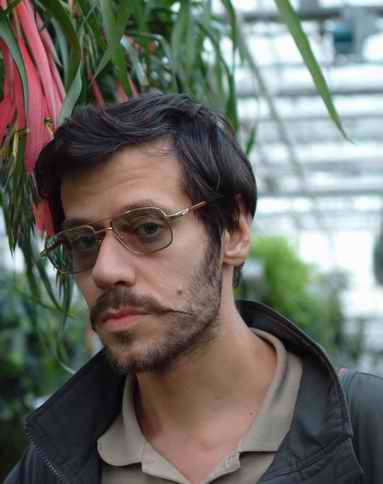
- Khanon, November 2004

Background information
- Also known as: Yuri Khanin (until 1992)
- Born: Yuri Soloviev-Savoyarov; June 16, 1965 (age 61); Leningrad, USSR (Russia)
- Genres: symphonic, chamber, opera, ballet, film score
- Occupation: Composer
- Instruments: Piano, voice
- Years active: 1987–present
- Website: yuri-khanon.com (in Russian)

Yuri Khanon is a pen name of Yuri Feliksovich Soloviev-Savoyarov (Russian: Юрий Феликсович Соловьёв-Савояров), a Russian composer. Prior to 1993, he wrote under a pen name Yuri Khanin, but later transformed it into Yuri Khanon, spelling it in a pre-1918 Russian style as ХанонЪ. Khanon was born on June 16, 1965, in Leningrad. In 1988, he became a laureate of the European Film Awards (Felix Award), and in 1989, he won the Nika Award, a Russian cinematographic award. Due to his numerous concerts throughout Russia, as well as to TV and cinema appearances, Khanon reached the peak of his popularity in 1988–1992, but in 1993, decided to stop performing in public.

== Biography ==
In 1988, in spite of an opposition of his old-fashioned professors, Yuri Khanon managed to graduate from the Leningrad Conservatory, specializing in composition.

Yuri Khanon is not just a composer; he is also a writer, a philosopher, a painter, a studio pianist, and a botanist-selectionist. Khanon is author of libretto and texts of almost all his works. His grandfather was Mikhail Savoyarov, a comic actor and composer, who was very famous in St.Petersburg (Petrograd) on the eve of the Revolution of 1917.

Khanon became famous in 1988–1991. During this period he composed soundtracks to three films, gave numerous concerts, had several appearances on TV and published a series of articles and interviews. Many of his performances yielded public scandals, especially his concerts Music of Dogs (Moscow, December 1988) and Dried Embryos, where he performed with Erik Satie (Leningrad, May 1991). In 1992 produced CD Olympia (England), symphonic works of Khanon (as a Yuri Khanin): Five smallest orgasms, A Certain Concerto for piano and orchestra and Middle Symphony.

Five Smallest orgasms, oc.29 (1986) were written as a direct response to Scriabin’s The Poem of Ecstasy. A Certain Concerto for piano & orchestra, oc.31 (1987) was written in the genre of "false concerto", concerto/deception, where the listener is constantly deceived, having his/her expectations crowned with emptiness. The theme of deception is one of the main features of Khanin’s creations. Middle Symphony, oc.40 (1990), with a text by the composer, is a large, quite extraordinary work with a rather unnatural and affected structure. It ends with a canon in which the three singers sing the same text backwards for 81 bars. The text is very abstruse, in fact almost absurd; it becomes necessary to overturn one’s impression of the whole symphony just listened to... Does this discussion exhaust the subject of this disc? I don’t know – I doubt it.

After 1992 Khanon ceased his public and TV appearances, as well as interviews and concerts, and stopped publishing his music works. Instead he decided, in his own words, "...to work and live in his own company". Khanon never participated in any professional organizations and is notable for his independent ideas and reclusive way of life.

... Beyond all doubts, Yuri Khanon came into the history of music as "the most closed and enigmatic composer". He was 23 when he won fame in Europe and made a sensation in Russia, but, after only three years of performing in public he stopped any public appearances contrary to the standards of a composer’s career. Metaphorically speaking, he stormed out and started a life of a recluse, thus having declared: "I’m done! You’d better think I exist no more!" And we, his contemporaries, have nothing to respond... – V. Tikhonov, "White Mask Empire" (Khangёre Simnun, Seoul, 2003).

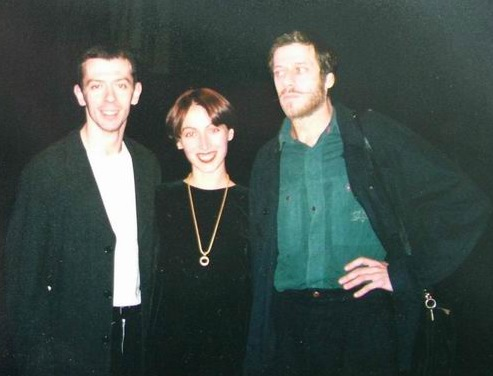
Alexei Ratmansky and Yuri Khanon, The Middle Duo, Mariinsky theatre, 24 November 1998

Among Khanon's works for theatre the most famous is The Middle Duo ballet (the first part of his Middle Symphony), put on the stage in Mariinsky Theatre in 1998 and short-listed for the Golden Mask Theatre Award in 2000, then put on the stage in Bolshoi Theatre and in New York City Ballet theatre in 2006. As a concert number The Middle Duo is performed around the world by almost all soloists of Russian ballet, though for 10 years Khanon's music has been used without his permission.

From the very beginning of his career Khanon deliberately evaded calling himself a composer, a writer, or an artist. Creative work is the least important for him, because, according to his ideas, there's more than enough composers and artists in our world. "It’s impossible to walk down the street without bumping into just another writer or composer", – Khanon ironically wrote in one of his articles in 1993. He viewed his main mission not in creating works of art, but in promotion of certain concepts put to life by the means of art.

...Yuri Khanon is a doctrinaire and an adherent of canons. This means he is not a composer. For Khanon the art of composing music is just a way of expressing his dogmas. Other ways he uses are literature and performance. Khanon plays Erik Satie’s and Alexander Skriabin’s piano works for he sees them as his teachers, and he calls other composers "just some composers". He himself writes a lot of music which can be either "middle" or "extreme". ... Khanon is a unique personality of our (and probably, some other) times, a strange and interesting person... – Viktor Ekimovsky, Auto-mono-graphy

== Works ==
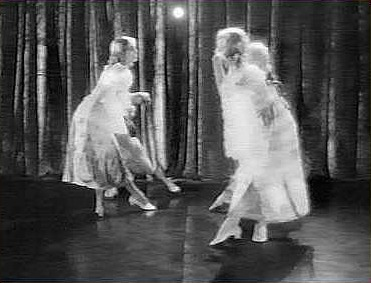
Passepied from opera-interlude The Shagreen Bone

Khanon works almost in all sphere of academic music.

- Ballets
  - "One step forward – two steps backward" (oc.24, 1986, based on a famous article by Vladimir Lenin).
  - "L’Os de chagrin" (oc.37, 1989, The Shagreen Bone, based on Balzac's novel "La Peau de chagrin").
  - "The Nutcrackle" (oc.43, 1990, based on Pyotr Ilyich Tchaikovsky's ballet The Nutcracker).
  - "Sigelle" (oc.55, 1993, based on Adolphe Adam's ballet Giselle).
- Operas
  - "L’Os de chagrin" (oc.38, 1990, The Shagreen Bone opera-interlude from the ballet L’Os de chagrin).
  - "Dull Life" (oc.54, 1993, dull opera, libretto of Yuri Khanon).
  - "The Force of Destiny" (oc.59, 1995, opera omonima based on opera La forza del destino of Giuseppe Verdi).
  - "The Norm" (oc.65, 1997, opera incognita, based on opera "Norma" of Vincenzo Bellini).
  - "What Zarathustra Said Indeed" (oc.68, 1998, clerical operette, based on "Thus Spoke Zarathustra" of Friedrich Nietzsche).
- Pieces for Orchestra
  - "The Symphony of Dogs" (oc.35, 1989).
  - "The Middle Symphony" (oc.40, 1990).
  - "Leafing People Through" (a 5 hours long orchestral fresco oc.54, 1992).
  - "Three Extreme Symphonies" (oc.60, 1996).
  - "The Laughing Symphony" (oc.70, 1999).

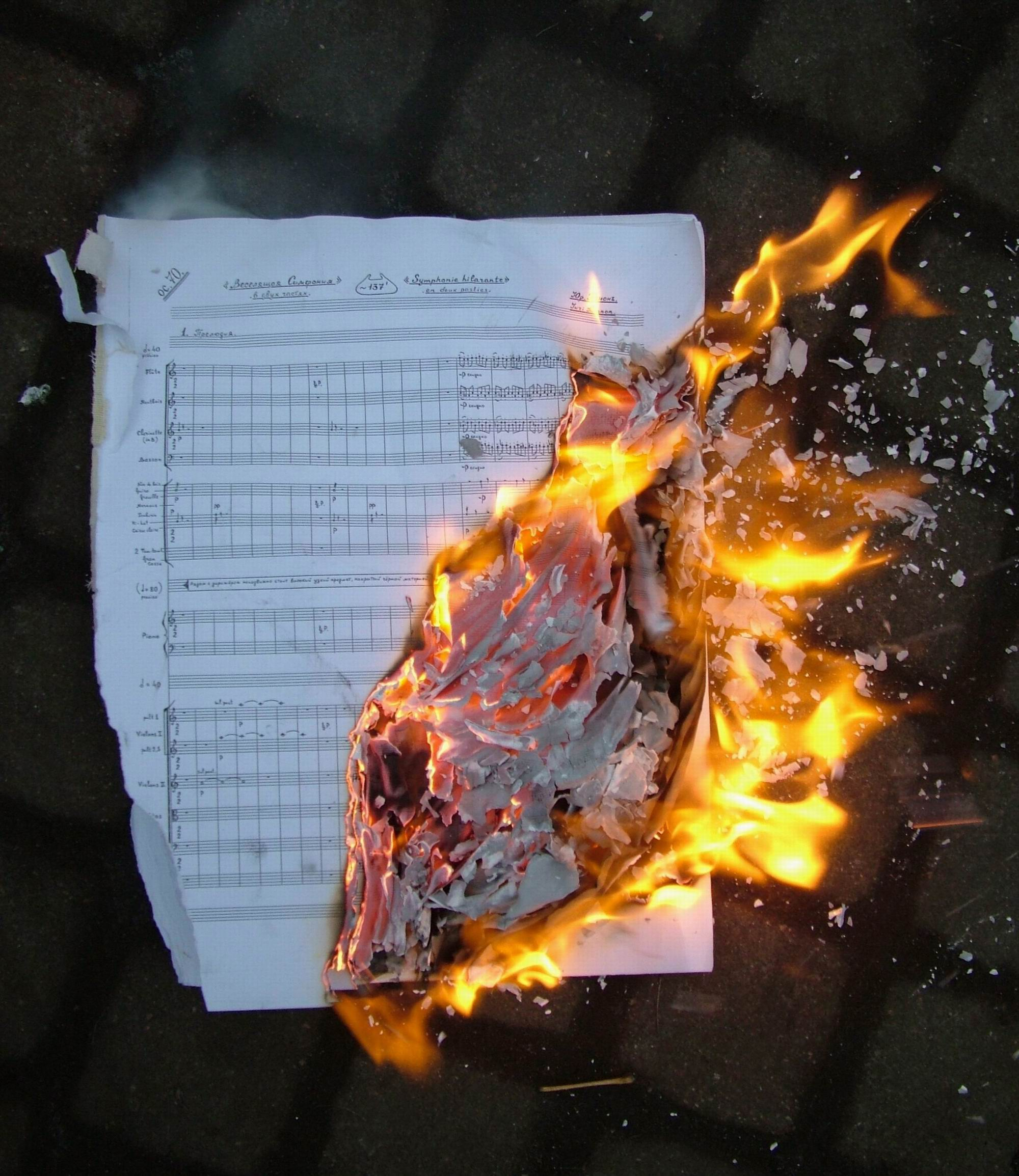
The Laughing Symphony (November 2017, first and last performance)

- Pseudo-religious works
  - "Missa sterilis" for five persons, (oc.61, 1996)
  - "The Inner Requiem", albigenian «Requiem internam» (oc.71, 1999)
  - the "Agonia Dei" mystery (oc.72, 2000)
- Opuses for piano
  - "The average tempered clavier" (ос.39, 1990)
  - "Satisfactory pieces" for acoustic piano (ос.56, 1994, «Pieces Saties-faisantes»)
  - "24 exercises on account of Weakness" (ос.62, 1996, for those wishing to go deeper)
  - "50 etudes for fallen piano" (ос.64, 1997, for a fallen piano)
  - "Ossified preludes" for piano (ос.67, 1998, four-hour time for piano)... and many other pieces of symphonic, chamber, and piano music.

...Although Khanon calls Satie and Skriabin his teachers, it is not the music of these composers that attracts him but their tendency to link – some would say subordinate – their music to an idea. According to Khanon, a composer is an ideologist with regard to his musical material. Elements of play (both semantic and phonetic), paradox, the absurd and nonsense (word inversion and invention, pseudo-quotation and limerick) all lend Khanon's aesthetic a desire to outrage the listener... – Liudmila Kovnatskaya, The New Grove Dictionary of Music and Musicians

Since 2006, Khanon switched to a special "reverse method" of creativity, when "one score is written forward, and the other is simultaneously back to its complete destruction". This is his hermetic answer: "This world is a criminal, it deserves nothing but ash..."

== Works for the cinema ==
Khanon worked for the cinema only for a short period between 1988 and 1991. He composed his first soundtrack (for Days of Eclipse by Alexander Sokurov) already as a Saint Petersburg Conservatory student.

...Yuri Khanin, a young composer, this year a graduate of the Leningrad Conservatory managed to do everything about the orchestration, arrangement and choice of instruments in a very precise way. It was done with an ideal exactitude. Never before had I worked with composers so much, and I was really struck by his understanding. ... I think that sound, no less than the image, should produce not only emotional impact, but is to have an altogether independent semantic meaning. The spirituality of the film as if finds its expression through the sound. And spirituality would not emerge by itself. If you might sometimes fail to keep alive the memory of a visual image in your mind and in your heart the soul would never forget sounds... – Alexander Sokurov, from press-conference on September 26, 1988

The film Days of Eclipse won the European Film Awards (Felix Award) of the European Film Academy in November 1988 in West Berlin in the Best Music special nomination. In spite of his great success, after 1991 Khanon never returned to writing music for the cinema.

Filmography :

- 1988 — "Days of Eclipse" (composer)
- 1989 — "Save and Preserve" (composer), (the film is based on "Madame Bovary" by Gustave Flaubert).
- 1990 — "The Petty Demon" (composer), (the film is based on "The Petty Demon" – a novel by Fyodor Sologub).
- 1992 — "L’os de chagrin" ("Shagreen Bone", in Russian, 38 min.) (a pseudodocumental opera-film, where Khanon acted as a composer, a script writer – in collaboration with Igor Bezrukov – and also performed the leading part).

== Literary works ==
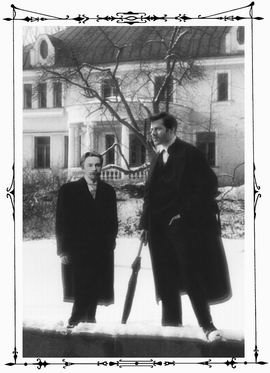
Frontispiece: Yuri Khanon & Alexander Skriabin, St.Petersburg, 1902.

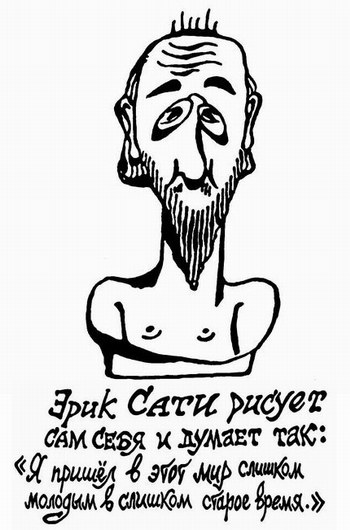
Erik Satie, the draft of the grave bust (1913) from the book "Antedate memories"

Since 1983, Khanon writes fiction and non-fiction as an essayist and novelist. His most famous work is 700 pages long memoir novel Skriabin as a Face (1995) based on the 20 years long Khanon's close acquaintance with the great Russian composer Alexander Skriabin. Part of the edition is a true polygraphic artwork produced with a natural leather binding, hand-made according to a 19th-century technique. The novel is written as a stylization of literary and spoken language of the beginning of the 20th century.

...For the first time in the history of music the narrator is not a biographer or a critic, not even a writer or a philosopher, but Alexander Skriabin’s counterpart and colleague and in a way a person of no less originality and uniqueness. This must explain why the memoir is absolutely free of banalities and literary cliché. Even ten years after his death, Skriabin is still a bosom friend of the author, a neighbour, an internal brother-in-arms... – Annotation from the Faces of Russia

In the year 2010, Center of Average Music and the publishing house Faces of Russia released another thick work of music history: Erik Satie, Yuri Khanon. Antedate memories. The book has a volume of 700 pages and it is not accidentally written in a provocative and free form. It includes all literary works, critical essays, notes and even notebooks of Erik Satie, as well as almost all the letters, more than sixty drawings and all his entire life, from birth to death. "This is the first book of Sati on Sati in Russian."

In 2013, the Center for Middle Music and the Liki Rossii publishing house released another precedent-setting publication, Yuri Khanon. “Alphonse, Who Wasn’t”. This is the first book by and about Alphonse Allais in Russian.

After 2009, Yuri Khanon began publishing his essays, stories, articles and research results on his own website ″Khanograf″, created together with Anna Tharon; their number exceeded two and a half hundred. In addition to the main author, Boris Yoffe, Viktor Ekimovsky, Vladimir Tikhonov, Psoy Korolenko, Anna t'Haron and other famous people also published on the same resource, often in co-authorship. The topics of the texts are very wide, from "natural philosophy of nature" to historical musicology, and generally correspond to the range of interests of the main author. Most of the articles are written in Russian, but there are materials in German and English. In 2024, both of Khanon's personal websites were archived "for eternal storage" in the catalog of the Bavarian State Library.
