= The Shagreen Bone =

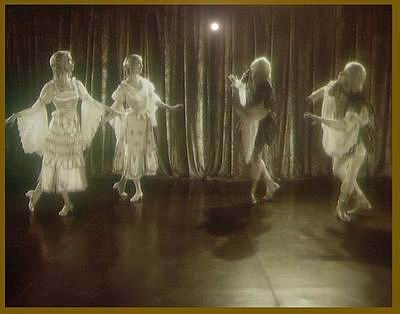
Menuet from the opera-entr'acte The Shagreen Bone

The Shagreen Bone (French: L'Os de chagrin, Russian: Шагреневая кость) Op. 37-38 (1990) is a full-length ballet in three acts and an opera entr'acte in one act by Yuri Khanon, to a libretto by the composer based on Balzac's 1831 novel The Shagreen Skin.

== History of Creation ==
The ballet (Op.37) and the entr'acte (Op.38) were written in 1990 on commission from the Mikhaylovsky Theatre in Leningrad. The libretto was written by the composer himself, its text is based entirely on dialogues selected from Balzac's novel between two characters: Polina and Raphael.

At the beginning of 1991, negotiations also took place about staging the ballet and intermission opera "The Chagrin Bone" in the Kirov Theater. Chief choreographer Oleg Vinogradov said: "This is a brilliant work. Such ballets are born very rarely, every 75 years, maybe even every 100. But I don't understand how this can be staged on our stage. Bring me a choreographer who will do that and I will give him the full chance». A month later, the young choreographer Andrei Bosov came to him and said he was ready to stage the ballet. However, Oleg Vinogradov rejected him.

In 1992, an avant-garde film-opera The Shagreen Bone was shot at the Saint Petersburg Documentary Film Studio, with Yuri Khanon in the main role. The soundtrack contained the entr'acte and some of his other works: The Song about Death No.1 and Mechanics of Thought Movement (from the cycle Public Songs, Op. 34). The film choreographer and scenographer was Andrei Bosov, the leader of the youth group of the Kirov Ballet.

== Background ==
The Shagreen Bone is written in the genre of "tendentious classical ballet" or "ballet with comments." Paradoxically, it was Ludwig Minkus's Don Quixote and Eric Satie's Parade which served as reference for the composer.

The point of reference for me became the ballet Parade by Satie. On the first page of the full score the imperishable words shine: ″To Erik Satie, my father, comrade, communist″. The opera entr'acte performed between the second and third act was inspired by Satie's idea of furniture music. As the baritone informs, the spectators can "go for a walk and have some meat" while on the stage there is a veristic performance depicting the relationship between the lovers. Every time the action overheats, a quiet and imperturbable rococo dance follows: Menuet, Passepied, Bourrée. This continues until the death of the hero and of the author. According to the novel of Balzac, they die from coughing, which looks very realistic on the stage.

— Yuri Khanon: "Primary position"

When working on the ballet libretto Khanon noticed how "hastily and carelessly this novel was written." Throughout the text one feels how Balzac was in a hurry to finish on time. Under the pressure of his creditors, he worked himself to the point of exhaustion.

Despite of eclectic and spreading, novel "Shagreen Skin" is a very constructive composition: the whole structure is described by one line of successive decreasing of life. <...> It pleases how carelessly the story is written, everywhere feels how Balzac hurried up..., under the pressure of his creditors the writer made his violent activity so intensive that caught a nervous exhaustion. The heavy weight of nervous exhausting, heavy activity, and also pressure of the creditors are still in his works and creates vain stress. In general, I decided that the ballet under Shagreen Skin should be a holiday of joyful decreasing of life.

— Yuri Khanon: "Primary position"

The scenography of the ballet is probably built according to the above-mentioned principle. As soon as the curtain rises, a huge, frozen line of fate (Stern's line from Balzac's novel) is brought before the public's eyes.[7]:9-11 It is all made of bones.

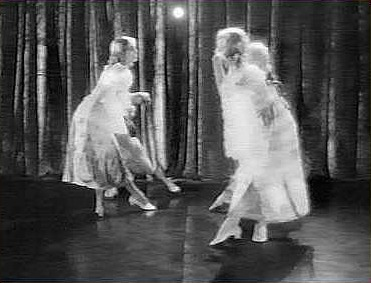
Passepied from the opera-entr'acte The Shagreen Bone

As composer and librettist in one, Khanon created a complete spectacle, a compressed version, a sort of extract of the formal ballet language. His aim was to stage not only a ballet but a "ballet about ballet." The Shagreen Bone was defined by the author as a rearguard ballet. This is a reference to the past, while keeping the odor of the present.

A frequently asked question: How could such a dramatic transformation occur when the skin of a shagreen, "the hide of a wild donkey," turned into "bones"? One can answer like this, for example: how many years have passed "since then"? Anything that does not decompose ossifies and then petrifies. In the novel Vanière, the gardener of monsieur Raphael de Valanten, examines with surprise a shagreen he found in a well and says: "dry as wood and not greasy at all." Thus, the work illustrates the idea of ossification of any culture, including classical ballet.

The Shagreen Bone is somehow the "reset" (rejection) of the culture of ballet. Subjected to the laws of ballet and summarizing the results of its development, the work demonstrates the absurdity of ballet and its stagnant forms. The composer seems to rise from the orchestra pit and throw bones in the face of the audience, that is to say, ballet clichés: grand pas, fouettés, variations, adagios. Yet the result is a beautiful romantic ballet, showed twice: firstly the ballet as such, with its meaningless joy and conventional character, and secondly with the author's attitude. This was one of the reasons, among others, for changing the title and replacing the "skin" with a "bone."

The author's innovative and eccentric attitude had a resonance in the avant-garde community. For example, the first issue of the new literary magazine ″Place of Seal″ (Mesto Pechati) began, as if by manifesto, with an essay entitled ″The Shagreen Bone″, which consisted of a fragment of the libretto of the first act of the ballet.
