= Olesya Novikova =

Russian ballet dancer

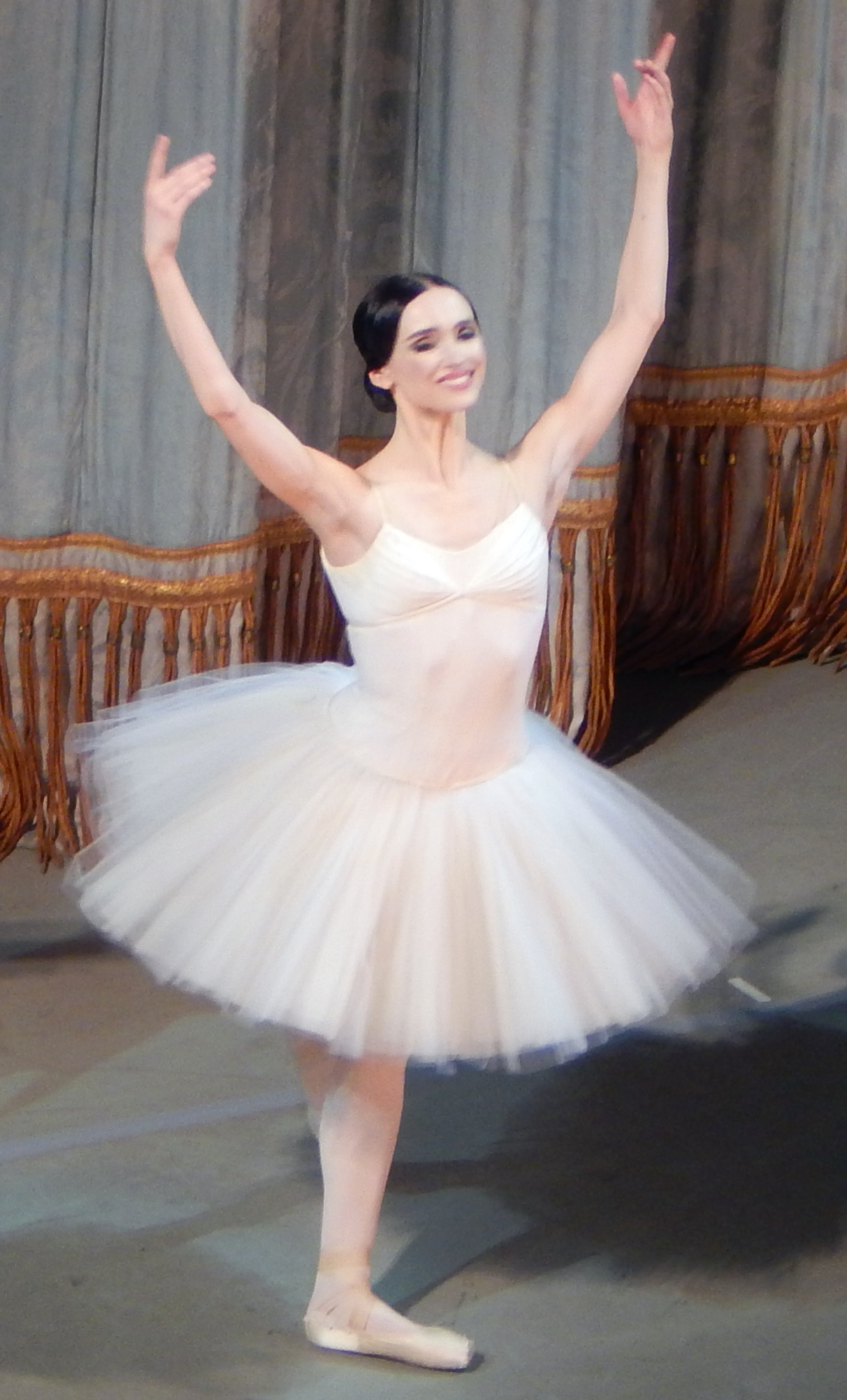
- Born: Saint Petersburg, Russia
- Education: Vaganova Academy of Russian Ballet
- Occupation: Ballerina
- Spouse: Leonid Sarafanov
- Career
- Current group: Mariinsky Theater

Olesya Novikova (Russian: Олеся Новикова) is a Russian ballet dancer. She is a principal dancer with the Mariinsky Theatre.

She was born in Saint Petersburg and studied at the Vaganova Academy of Russian Ballet. Upon graduation, she joined the Mariinsky Theatre; she has toured with them in Great Britain, Germany and China. Novikova won a prize at the International Vaganova-Prix Ballet Dancers' Competition in 2002.

Novikova created the female lead role in Du Côté de chez “Swann” by Alexei Miroshnichenko. In 2011, she played the lead role in the ballet Raymonda.

In 2021, Novikova was promoted to the rank of Principal dancer of the Mariinsky Theatre.

She is married to Leonid Sarafanov, with him they have 4 children: Alexei (born 2010), Ksenia (born 2015), Alexander (born 2018) and Konstantin (born 2022).

== Repertoire ==
- La Sylphide (the Sylph); choreography by August Bournonville
- Giselle (Giselle); choreography by Jean Coralli, Jules Perrot, and Marius Petipa
- Le Corsaire (Gulnare); choreography by Marius Petipa
- La Bayadère (Nikiya, Gamzatti); choreography by Marius Petipa
- The Sleeping Beauty (Aurora, La Fee Miettes qui tombent, La Fee Coulante, Fleur de Farine, Gold Fairy, Silver Fairy); choreography by Marius Petipa, version by Konstantin Sergeyev
- The Sleeping Beauty (Aurora, Generosity Fairy, Silver Fairy); choreography by Marius Petipa, version by Sergei Vikharev
- Swan Lake (Odette-Odile, Pas de trois, Cygnets); choreography by Marius Petipa
- Raymonda (Raymonda, grand pas, variation); choreography by Marius Petipa
- Le Réveil de Flore (Flore); choreography by Marius Petipa
- Don Quixote (Kitri, Flower Girl, Variation in Act IV); choreography by Alexander Gorsky
- Chopiniana (Nocturne, Eleventh Waltz); choreography by Michel Fokine
- Fountain of Bakhchisarai (Maria); choreography by Rostislav Zakharov
- The Nutcracker (Masha); choreography by Vasili Vainonen
- Romeo and Juliet (Juliet); choreography by Leonid Lavrovsky
- Etudes; choreography by Harald Lander
- Marguerite and Armand (Marguerite); choreography by Frederick Ashton
- Manon (Courtesan); choreography by Kenneth MacMillan
- Apollo (Polyhymnia); choreography by George Balanchine
- Symphony in C (Third Movement); choreography by George Balanchine
- The Four Temperaments; choreography by George Balanchine
- Jewels (Emeralds, Rubies, Diamonds); choreography by George Balanchine
- Ballet Imperial; choreography by George Balanchine
- Theme and Variations; choreography by George Balanchine
- Tchaikovsky Pas de Deux; choreography by George Balanchine
- The Legend of Love (Shyrin); choreography by Yuri Grigorovich
- Carmen Suite (Carmen); choreography by Alberto Alonso
- Adagio Hammerklavier; choreography by Hans van Manen
- 5 Tangos; choreography by Hans van Manen
- The Nutcracker (Masha); production by Mihail Chemiakin and Kirill Simonov
- Middle Duet; choreography by Alexei Ratmansky
- Anna Karenina (Anna); choreography by Alexei Ratmansky
- The Vertiginous Thrill of Exactitude; choreography by William Forsythe
- In the Middle, Somewhat Elevated; choreography by William Forsythe
- Ondine (Ondine, Naiads); choreography by Pierre Lacotte
- Without; choreography by Benjamin Millepied
- Le Parc (Soloist); choreography by Angelin Preljocaj
- Les noces; choreography by Bronislava Nijinska
- Grand Pas Classique; choreography by Victor Gsovsky
- The Meek One (the Meek One); choreography by Donvena Pandoursky
- Flight of Angels (Soloist); choreography by Edwaard Liang
- Du Cote de chez Swann; choreography by Alexei Miroshnichenko
- Nirvana; choreography by Emil Faski

In 2011, at Teatro alla Scala she appeared in the lead role in the premiere performance of the ballet Raymonda (production by Sergei Vikharev)

== Awards and nominations ==
Year	Association	Category	Work	Result	Ref.
2011	Golden Mask	Ballet/Contemporary Dance – Best Actress	Quatro	Nominated	
