= Anna t'Haron =

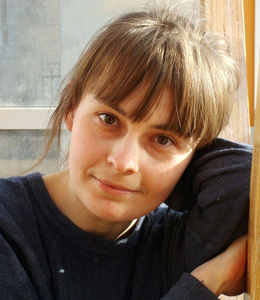
- Anna Yevdokimova (Saint Petersburg, Russia)

Background information
- Born: Anna Yevdokimova; 6 August 1978 (age 47); Chimkent, Kazakh SSR, USSR
- Genres: Art music
- Occupations: Pianist, concertmaster, artist, impersonator
- Instrument: Piano
- Website: yevdokimova.com/homepage_eng.html

Anna t'Haron is a pen name of Anna Yevdokimova (date of birth: 6 August 1978, place of birth: Chimkent, Kazakh SSR) – a Russian pianist, laureate of the All-Russian and International chamber music and piano-duo competitions. Since 2009 Anna is a grant holder of the "Prins Bernhard Cultuurfonds". She also works as an artist, web-designer, and Personator (artist and photographer – restorer, image editor and photo-stylist).

== Musical biography ==
In 1997 she graduated with honour the Piano Department of the S.I.Taneev Musical College in Kaluga. In 2005 Anna graduated with honors (Cum Laude) the Saratov State Conservatory named L.Sobinov (class of Prof. Anatoly Skripay).

In the same 2005 she left for the Netherlands there to continue perfecting her performing mastery. At first in the Conservatorium van Amsterdam with Prof. Naum Grubert and then in ArtEZ Conservatorium Enschede with Prof. Mikhail Markov.

Alongside the concert activity (as a soloist as a chamber music partner with vocalists and instrumentalists) she participated in masters–courses, competitions and different international festivals, such as for example: III All-Russian chamber music and piano-duo competition (Novomoskovsk, Russia, 1997 – Honorary diploma and the competition diploma winner), Almere International Chamber Music Competition (Netherlands, 2007 – Finalist), a concert tour around the Mediterranean countries as a duo "piano-violin" with violinist & duo-partner Ksenia Beltyukova (2007), IV Monographic Rachmaninov International Piano Competition (Moscow, Russia, 2008), "Euregio Musikfestival" (Osnabrück, Germany, 2008), "Val Tidone Summer Camp" (Italy, 2010), etc. The concert repertoire of pianist Anna Yevdokimova includes works within the Academic Music genre. Furthermore, she has a circle of the musical preferences which includes I.S. Bach, C.Ph.E. Bach, Couperin, Rameau, Mozart, Khanon, Skriabin, Satie and Debussy.

Anna recorded several albums, including CDs:
2000–2005 "S. Rachmaninov. Preludes – Etudes-Tableaux" (Preludes Op.23, Etudes-Tableaux Op.33).
2005 – "J.S. Bach. Clavier Concertos" (Clavier Concertos BWV 1052, 1053, 1055, 1056).
2007 – "Sonatas for piano and violin. J. Brahms—E. Elgar" (J.Brahms. Sonata for piano and violin No.3 Op.108; E.Elgar. Sonata for piano and violin Op.82 ^{*violin – Ksenia Beltiukova}). Limited edition.
2010 – "Golden Stones" (J.S. Bach "Goldberg-Variationen", BWV 988).

== Other activities ==
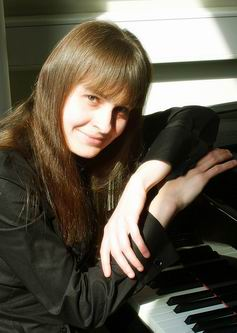
Anna Yevdokimova (2007) (Amsterdam, Netherlands)

As an Artist, Anna t'Haron working in two genres of fine art: Graphics art and her own art direction "multidimensional graphic arts" grounded on the geometry's principles of regular polyhedrons and synthesis of the different fine art's technological ways: from a simple drawing on paper up to a complicated computer-generated image. As an Artist–Personator she participated in decorating books jointly with the author Yuri Khanon: "Two Processes", "The black Alleys", "Nietzsche contra Khanon", and "Alphonse Who Did Not Exist".

Since 2009, Anna t’Haron has been actively working on the Khanograf website, where she has published dozens of texts and scientific papers, both on her own and in collaboration with Yuri Khanon. In addition to the main author, Boris Yoffe, Viktor Ekimovsky, Vladimir Tikhonov, Psoy Korolenko and other famous people also published on the same resource, often in co-authorship. The topics of the texts are very wide, from "natural philosophy of nature" to historical musicology, and generally correspond to the range of interests of the main author. Most of the articles are written in Russian, but there are materials in German and English. In 2024, the Khanograf website and its more than three hundred articles were archived “for permanent preservation” in the catalogue of the Bavarian State Library.
