= European Film Award for Best Composer =

Annual award given for cinematic achievements in composing

- Country: Europe
- Presented by: European Film Academy
- First award: 1989
- Currently held by: Hania Rani – Sentimental Value (2025)
- Website: europeanfilmawards.eu

The European Film Award for Best Composer is one of the awards presented by the European Film Academy. It was first presented as a Special Jury Award in 1988 received by Yuri Khanon for the music of Days of Eclipse. A set of nominees was presented from 1989 to 1990 and from 2004 and 2012. Since 2013, only one winner is presented without nominees.

== Winners and nominees ==
=== 1980s ===
Year	Composer(s)	Film	Original title	Ref.
1988 (1st)	Special Jury Award for Best Music			
1988 (1st)	Yuri Khanon	Days of Eclipse	Дни затмения	
1988 (1st)	Nomination for Special Aspect Award			
1988 (1st)	Terence Davies	Distant Voices, Still Lives		
1989 (2nd)	Andrew Dickson	High Hopes		
1989 (2nd)	Goran Bregovic	Kuduz		
1989 (2nd)	Ferenc Darvas	Eldorado	Eldorádó	
1989 (2nd)	Michał Lorenc	300 Miles to Heaven	300 mil do nieba	
1989 (2nd)	Maggie Parke and Gast Waltzing	A Wopbopaloobop A Lopbamboom		

=== 1990s ===
Year	Composer(s)	Film	Original title	Ref.
1990 (3rd)	No awards given			
1990 (3rd)	Jean-Luc Godard	Nouvelle Vague		
1990 (3rd)	Jean-Claude Petit	Cyrano de Bergerac		
1990 (3rd)	Jürgen Knieper	December Bride	Dezemberbraut	
1991 (4th)	Hilmar Örn Hilmarsson	Children of Nature	Börn náttúrunnar	
1992 (5th)	Vincent van Warmerdam	The Northerners	De Noorderlingen	

=== 2000s ===
Year	Composer(s)	Film	Original title	Ref.
2004 (17th)	Bruno Coulais	The Chorus	Les Choristes	
2004 (17th)	Alexandre Desplat	Girl with a Pearl Earring		
2004 (17th)	The Free Association	Code 46		
2004 (17th)	Alberto Iglesias	Bad Education	La Mala Educación	
2004 (17th)	Alberto Iglesias	Take My Eyes	Te doy mis ojos	
2004 (17th)	Eleni Karaindrou	Trilogy: The Weaping Meadow	Trilogia: To livadi pou dakrizei	
2004 (17th)	Stephen Warbeck	The Alzheimer Case	De Zaak Alzheimer	
2005 (18th)	Rupert Gregson-Williams and Andrea Guerra	Hotel Rwanda		
2005 (18th)	Joachim Holbek	Manderlay		
2005 (18th)	Cyril Morin	The Syrian Bride	הכלה הסורית	
2005 (18th)	Ennio Morricone	Fateless	Sorstanság	
2005 (18th)	Stefan Nilsson	As It Is in Heaven	Så som i himmelen	
2005 (18th)	Johan Söderqvist	Brothers	Brødre	
2006 (19th)	Alberto Iglesias	Volver		
2006 (19th)	Tuomas Kantelinen	Mother of Mine	Äideistä parhain	
2006 (19th)	Dario Marianelli	Pride & Prejudice		
2006 (19th)	Gabriel Yared and Stéphane Moucha	The Lives of Others	Das Leben der Anderen	
2007 (20th)	Alexandre Desplat	The Queen		
2007 (20th)	Alex Heffes	The Last King of Scotland		
2007 (20th)	Dejan Pejović	Gucha	Гуча!	
2007 (20th)	Tom Tykwer, Johnny Klimek, and Reinhold Heil	Perfume: The Story of a Murderer	Das Parfum – Die Geschichte eines Mörders	
2008 (21st)	Max Richter	Waltz with Bashir	ואלס עם באשיר	
2008 (21st)	Tuur Florizoone	Moscow, Belgium	Aanrijding in Moscou	
2008 (21st)	Dario Marianelli	Atonement		
2008 (21st)	Fernando Velázquez	The Orphanage	El orfanato	
2009 (22nd)	Alberto Iglesias	Broken Embraces	Los abrazos rotos	
2009 (22nd)	Alexandre Desplat	Coco avant Chanel	Coco avant Chanel	
2009 (22nd)	Jacob Groth	The Girl with the Dragon Tattoo	Män som hatar kvinnor	
2009 (22nd)	Johan Söderqvist	Let the Right One In	Låt den rätte komma in	

=== 2010s ===
Year	Composer(s)	Film	Original title	Ref.
2010 (23rd)	Alexandre Desplat	The Ghost Writer		
2010 (23rd)	Ales Brezina	Kawasaki's Rose	Kawasakiho růže	
2010 (23rd)	Pasquale Catalano	Loose Cannons	Mine vaganti	
2010 (23rd)	Gary Yershon	Another Year		
2011 (24th)	Ludovic Bource	The Artist		
2011 (24th)	Alexandre Desplat	The King's Speech		
2011 (24th)	Alberto Iglesias	The Skin I Live In	La piel que habito	
2011 (24th)	Mihály Vig	The Turin Horse	A torinói ló	
2012 (25th)	Alberto Iglesias	Tinker Tailor Soldier Spy		
2012 (25th)	George Fenton	The Angels' Share		
2012 (25th)	François Couturier	Shun Li and the Poet	Io sono Li	
2012 (25th)	Cyrille Aufort and Gabriel Yared	A Royal Affair	En kongelig affære	
2013 (26th)	Ennio Morricone	The Best Offer	La migliore offerta	
2014 (27th)	Mica Levi	Under the Skin		
2015 (28th)	Cat's Eyes	The Duke of Burgundy		
2016 (29th)	Ilya Demutsky	The Student	Ученик	
2017 (30th)	Evgueni Galperine and Sacha Galperine	Loveless	Нелюбовь	
2018 (31st)	Christoph M. Kaiser and Julian Maas	3 Days in Quiberon	3 Tage in Quiberon	
2019 (32nd)	John Gürtler	System Crasher	Systemsprenger	

=== 2020s ===
Year	Composer(s)	Film	Original title	Ref.
2020 (33rd)	Dascha Dauenhauer	Berlin Alexanderplatz		
2021 (34th)	Nils Petter Molvær and Peter Brötzmann	Great Freedom	Große Freiheit	
2022 (35th)	Paweł Mykietyn	EO	IO	
2023 (36th)	Markus Binder	Club Zero		
2024 (37th)	Frederikke Hoffmeier	The Girl with the Needle	Pigen med nålen	
2025 (38th)	Hania Rani	Sentimental Value	Affeksjonsverdi	
2025 (38th)	Jerskin Fendrix	Bugonia		
2025 (38th)	Michael Fiedler and Eike Hosenfeld	Sound of Falling	In die Sonne schauen	
2026 (39th)	Alberto Iglesias	Bitter Christmas	Amarga Navidad	
2026 (39th)	Volker Bertelmann	Bunker		
2026 (39th)	Tara Nome Doyle	Rose		

== See also ==
- Academy Award for Best Original Score
- BAFTA Award for Best Original Music
- Cannes Soundtrack Award
- César Award for Best Original Music
- Golden Globe Award for Best Original Score
- Goya Award for Best Original Score
- Grammy Award for Best Score Soundtrack for Visual Media
