= Malyanov =

Malyanov or Malianov (Russian: Малянов, feminine: Malyanova or Malianova) is an East-Slavic surname. The surname may refer to:

- Dmitry Malyanov, a fictional astrophysicist from works by Russian writers Arkady and Boris Strugatsky, first introduced in the 1974 novel translated in English as Definitely Maybe
- Fyodor Malyanov, a character from the 1983 Soviet film Wartime Romance
- Gennady Malianov, fictional detective from a cycle of science fiction / techno thriller stories by Canadian writer Karl Schroeder
- Yevgeny Malyanov (born 1950), Russian culturologist, former rector of Perm State Institute of Culture
