= State Ballet of Georgia =

Georgian ballet company

The State Ballet of Georgia is the ballet company of the Z. Paliashvilil Opera and Ballet State Theatre in Tbilisi. Nina Ananiashvili has been artistic director since 2004. Its repertory includes works by Ashton, Balanchine, Bournonville, Kylián, Ratmansky, Possokhov, McIntyre and Welch. The company has toured to New York City in 2007, 2008, 2010 and 2011, to Jacob's Pillow, to Edinburgh and to London.

== Avery Fisher Hall, November 2011 ==
Charms of Mannerism (Note: Couperin arranged by Vladimir Grishin, Alexei Ratmansky choreographer)

- Nina Ananiashvili
- Lali Kandelaki
- Vasil Akhmeteli
- William Pratt

Bizet Variations (Note: Bizet, Alexei Ratmansky choreographer)

- Anna Muradeli
- Ekaterine Surmava
- Ana Albutashvili
- Vasil Akhmeteli
- David Ananeli
- Otar Khelashvili

SWAN (Note: Saint-Saëns)

- Nina Ananiashvili

Dreams of Japan (Note: Eto, Yamaguchi and Tosha, Alexei Ratmansky choreographer)

- Nina Ananiashvili
- the company

== Reviews ==
- NY Times, Alastair Macaulay, February 29, 2008
- NY Times, Alastair Macaulay, March 3, 2008
- NY Times, Claudia La Rocco, June 24, 2010
- NY Times, Brian Seibert, November 6, 2011
- Washington Examiner, Marie Gullard, November 10, 2011
