= Passepied =

French court dance

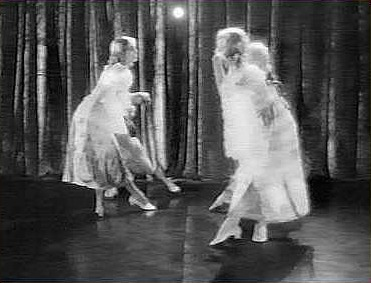
Passepied from opera-interlude The Shagreen Bone

The passepied (French pronunciation: [pasˈpje], "pass-foot", from a characteristic dance step) is a French court dance. Originating as a kind of Breton branle, it was adapted to courtly use in the 16th century and is found frequently in 18th-century French opera and ballet, particularly in pastoral scenes, and latterly also in baroque instrumental suites of dances. In English the passepied has been spelled "paspy" as well as "paspie" or "paspe", phonetic approximations of the French pronunciation.

== History ==
The earliest historical mention of the passepied was by Noël du Fail in 1548, who said it was common at Breton courts. François Rabelais and Thoinot Arbeau, writing later in the 16th century, identify the dance as a type of branle characteristic of Brittany. At this time it was a fast duple-time dance with three-bar phrases, therefore of the branle simple type. Like many folk-dances it was popular at the court of Louis XIV.

The passepied was remodelled by Jean-Baptiste Lully as a pastoral concert dance, first appearing in the 1680s as a faster minuet. It is accounted the fastest of the triple-time dances of the time, usually with a time signature of 3/8 (also occasionally 6/8 or 3/4), its phrases starting upon the last beat of the measure. Its phrasing had to divide into four measures to accommodate the four characteristic tiny steps over two measures. It used the steps of the minuet, which Lully had long before similarly adapted, to quite different effect, moving lightly and tracing elaborate patterns upon the floor.

After this the passepied appeared in a great many theatrical productions, including those of Jean-Philippe Rameau. It is found as late as 1774 in Christoph Willibald Gluck's Iphegenia in Aulis.

Writing in 1739 Johann Mattheson described the passepied as a fast dance, with a character approaching frivolity, for which reason it lacks "the eagerness, anger, or heat expressed by the gigue". Italians often used it as a finale for instrumental sinfonie.

Passepieds occasionally appear in suites such as J.S. Bach's Orchestral Suite No. 1 and Partita No. 5 in G major, or dramatic music such as his French Overture for harpsichord. There are often two Passepieds in minor and major keys to be played in the order I, II, I, or else passepieds occur in contrasting pairs, the first reappearing after the second as a da capo. It also appeared as a movement in Henry Purcell's opera, Dioclesian, (Note: Several PDF scans of this publication may be found on Henry Purcell's IMSLP page. Page 118 of the original publication corresponds to the 130th page of the 196-page colour scan, and pp. 118–19 are both found on the 62nd page of the 89-page black-and-white scan (which is done "two pages up") where the title may be seen in archaic spelling as "paſpe" (the letter ſ being the archaic long s, used only in lowercase, also found on the publication's title page, viz. "THE Vocal and Inſtrumental MUSICK OF THE PROPHETESS, OR THE HISTORY OF DIOCLESIAN. COMPOSED By Henry Purcell, Organiſt of Their MAJESTIES Chappel, and of St. Peters Weſtminſter", in the printer's name "J. Heptinſtall", and indeed throughout the publication, whereas in modern editions this letter is ordinarily changed without comment to short s). See List of compositions by Henry Purcell, Z 627 for the modern spelling. Alfred Deller (Volume Two) – Music Of Henry Purcell, a compilation album released in 2008, also denotes passepied as both "paspe" and "passepied" according to its 5th disc (previously issued on LP as Vanguard / The Bach Guild BG-682) and its respective 5th track.) and hundreds of other Baroque compositions.

== Revivals ==
Léo Delibes wrote a passepied as part of his incidental music for the play Le roi s'amuse by Victor Hugo. More modern examples include:

- The fourth and final movement of Claude Debussy's Suite bergamasque for piano
- The third movement of Igor Stravinsky's Symphony in C, which consists of a minuet, passepied, and fugue
- The second number in act 2 of Sergei Prokofiev's ballet Cinderella
- The first of five dances in the ball scene of Miklós Rózsa's Madame Bovary
- The first of five dances in the third movement, "Révérences engrenées, premier pentacle", of Henri Pousseur's Jardinet avec automates for piano
- The third movement of Christopher Rouse's orchestral ballet Friandises
- The fourth movement of the Garden of the Senses Suite in part 2 of Michael Gandolfi's The Garden of Cosmic Speculation
- The 2nd piece of Jean-Michel Blais's 2022 album Aubades
