= Leonid Sarafanov =

Ukrainian ballet dancer

- Born: June 28, 1982 (age 44); Kyiv, Ukrainian SSR, Soviet Union
- Education: Kyiv State School of Choreography
- Occupation: Ballet dancer
- Spouse: Olesya Novikova
- Children: 4
- Career
- Current group: Mikhailovsky Ballet
- Former groups: Mariinsky Ballet, National Ballet of Ukraine
- Dances: Swan Lake, Giselle, Don Quixote, The Sleeping Beauty, La Bayadère

Leonid Sarafanov (born 28 June 1982 in Kyiv, Ukraine) is a principal ballet dancer with the Mikhailovsky Theatre in St Petersburg, Russia.

== Biography ==
Leonid Sarafanov studied at the Kyiv State School of Choreography and graduated in 2000, joining the National Ballet of Ukraine the same year as soloist.

In 2002, he was invited to join the Mariinsky Ballet in St Petersburg by the director of the time, Makhar Vaziev and quickly became famous. The young Ukrainian was catapulted into the most challenging of roles in the Mariinsky repertoire and abroad on tour. He was promoted to soloist in 2003 and finally, became a principal. In January 2011, he left the Mariinsky and joined the Mikhailovsky Ballet as a principal.

His repertoire includes James in La Sylphide, Solor in La Bayadère, Prince Siegfried in Swan Lake, the Nutcracker-Prince in The Nutcracker, Prince Désiré in The Sleeping Beauty, Basilio in Don Quixote, and Romeo in Romeo and Juliet. He has also danced the lead roles in ballets by George Balanchine, such as Apollo and Jewels.

In 2006, he danced the lead role of Matteo in the premiere of Pierre Lacotte's revival of Ondine.

== Personal life ==
Sarafanov's wife is Mariinsky ballerina, Olesya Novikova; the couple lives in St Petersburg with their four children.
