= Alexei Ratmansky =

Russian ballet dancer and choreographer

- Алексей Ратманский, Олексiй Ратманський
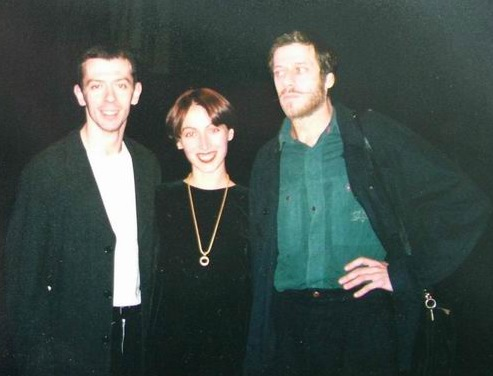
- Alexei and Tatiana Ratmansky with Yuri Khanon at the Mariinsky theatre in 1998 (Middle Duet)
- Born: Алексей Осипович Ратманский; August 27, 1968 (age 58); Leningrad, Soviet Union
- Occupations: Ballet dancer, choreographer, company director
- Employer(s): National Opera of Ukraine; Royal Winnipeg Ballet; Royal Danish Ballet; Bolshoi Theatre; American Ballet Theatre; New York City Ballet
- Spouse: Tatiana Kilivniuk
- Children: 1

Alexei Osipovich Ratmansky (Russian: Алексей Осипович Ратманский, born August 27, 1968) is a Russian-Ukrainian-American choreographer and former ballet dancer. From 2004 to 2008 he was the director of the Moscow Bolshoi Ballet. He left Russia in 2008. In 2009 he was appointed the artist in residence at the American Ballet Theatre, and as artist in residence at the New York City Ballet from August 2023.

== Training and performance career ==
Ratmansky was born in Leningrad in Russia, Soviet Union, grew up in Kyiv, then in the Soviet Union, later the capital of independent Ukraine, and trained under Pyotr Pestov and Alexandra Markeyeva at the Bolshoi Ballet School in Moscow. He graduated in 1986. He then started his professional career in Kyiv and was a principal dancer with the Ukrainian National Ballet, Royal Winnipeg Ballet and Royal Danish Ballet.

== Choreographic and administrative careers ==
Ratmansky's choreographic career first became notable with his staging of the ballet Dreams of Japan for the State Ballet of Georgia in 1998. Dreams and Charms of Mannerism, choreographed in 1997, were both created for Nina Ananiashvili. Dreams earned the Golden Mask Award from the Theatre Union of Russia.

Ratmansky is noted for restaging traditionally classical ballets for large companies. His first three-act story ballet was Cinderella, created for the Kirov Ballet in 2002. Ratmansky's 2003 staging of The Bright Stream (also translated as "The Limpid Stream") for the Bolshoi Ballet led to his appointment as artistic director of that company the following year. While there he also made a full-length production of The Bolt, in 2005, and re-staged Le Corsaire and the Flames of Paris, in 2007 and 2008. The Critics' Circle in London has named the Bolshoi "Best Foreign Company" under Ratmansky's direction, in 2005 and 2007, and he received its National Dance Award for The Bright Stream.

After his directorship at the Bolshoi, Ratmansky agreed to become the first artist in residence for the American Ballet Theatre in 2008 after negotiations with the New York City Ballet failed over the position of resident choreographer. His ballets for the New York City Ballet include Russian Seasons and Concerto DSCH, and for the American Ballet Theatre, On the Dnieper and Seven Sonatas.

In 2011, his choreography of Prokofiev's Romeo and Juliet was premiered by the National Ballet of Canada in Toronto. Its performance in London earned Ratmansky the praise from New York Times reviewer Alastair Macaulay of being "the most gifted choreographer specializing in classical ballet today."

In 2014, Ratmansky took his career in a new direction when he reconstructed Marius Petipa's final revival of Paquita from the Sergeyev Collection. The reconstruction was premièred in Munich in December 2014, performed by the Bavarian State Ballet. In March 2015, he mounted his second Petipa reconstruction for American Ballet Theatre - The Sleeping Beauty, which premièred in Orange County and was later staged at the Teatro alla Scala. Ratmansky is currently reconstructing the Petipa/Ivanov 1895 staging of Swan Lake, which was premièred in Zurich in February 2016.

He was choreographing a new work at the Bolshoi when Russia invaded Ukraine in 2022; he immediately left Russia and condemned the invasion. His parents and in-laws were still in Ukraine in August 2023, and could not leave.

In January 2023 the New York City Ballet announced that Ratmansky would join them as an artist in residence in August 2023.

=== Choreographed works ===
- 1988: La Sylphide-88, Duet-buff #1 & 2
- 1993: Pas de Graham
- 1994: The Fairy's Kiss, Alborada, Whipped Cream, 98 steps
- 1995: Hurluburlu, Poor Little Things
- 1996: Sarabande
- 1997: Charms of Mannerism, Capriccio, Krakowyak, Old Juniet's Carriol
- 1998: Dreams of Japan, Middle Duet, Poem of Extazy, Fairy's Kiss (2nd version)
- 1999: Water, Chrizantemums
- 2001: Turandot's Dream, Flight to Budapest, Leah, The Nutcracker
- 2002: Cinderella, Vers la Flamme, The Firebird
- 2003: The Bright Stream, Carnaval des Animaux, Bolero
- 2004: Anna Karenina, Leah (2nd version)
- 2005: The Bolt, Jeu de cartes
- 2006: Russian Seasons
- 2007: Le Corsaire (after Mazilier & Petipa, with Yuri Burlaka), Old Women Falling Out
- 2008: Biset Variations, Pierrot Lunaire, Concerto DSCH, Flames of Paris (after Vainonen)
- 2009: The Little Humpbacked Horse, Valse-Fantasie, On the Dnieper, Scuola di Ballo, Seven Sonatas
- 2010: Don Quixote (after Petipa & Gorsky), Namouna, Fandango, The Nutcracker (2nd version)
- 2011: Lost Illusions, Dumbarton, Psyche, Romeo & Juliet
- 2012: Souvenir d'un Lieu Cher, Symphonic Dances, The Firebird (2nd version), The Golden Cockerel, Symphony No. 9
- 2013: 24 Preludes, From Foreign Lands, Chamber Symphony, Piano Concerto No. 1, Cinderella (2nd version), Opera, The Tempest
- 2014: Tanzsuite, Pictures at an Exhibition, Rondo Capriccioso
- 2016: Serenade After Plato’s Symposium
- 2017: Whipped Cream, Odessa, Songs of Bukovina,
- 2019: The Seasons
- 2020: Voices, Of Love and Rage
- 2021: Bernstein in a Bubble
- 2022: Wartime Elegy, Tchaikovsky Overtures
- 2023: Coppélia
- 2024: La Séparation, Solitude
- 2025: Paquita, Trio Kagel, The Art of the Fugue
- 2026: The Naked King, Roses from the South, Wonderland, Hemi-Semi-Demi

=== Reconstructions ===
- 2014: Paquita
- 2015: The Sleeping Beauty
- 2016: Swan Lake
- 2018: Harlequinade, La Bayadère
- 2019: Giselle

== Awards ==
Ratmansky received the 2005 and 2014 Prix Benois de la Danse for choreography for, respectively, Anna Karenina, staged for the Royal Danish Ballet, and Shostakovich Trilogy and The Tempest, put on for the American Ballet Theatre. He also received the 2007 Golden Mask Award for Best Choreographer for Jeu de Cartes choreographed for the Bolshoi Ballet.

In 2013, Ratmansky was named as the MacArthur Fellow of the year, an award that came with "genius grant" for "working in any field, who "show exceptional merit and promise for continued and enhanced creative work". (http://www.macfound.org/fellows/900/)

In 2020, Ratmansky was named by Carnegie Corporation of New York as an honoree of the Great Immigrants Award
