= Daria Pavlenko =

Russian ballet dancer

Daria Pavlenko, Russian: Да́рья Павле́нко, (born 19 November 1978) is a Russian ballet dancer, currently one of the stars of the Mariinsky Ballet in Saint Petersburg.

== Early life ==
Born in Moscow, Pavelnko was refused admittance to the Bolshoi Ballet School in her home town but, like her sister Nadia before her, she was able to study at the Vaganova Academy in Saint Petersburg. There she followed the full eight-year course, first with Olga Iskanderova and then with Elena Evteyeva.

== Career ==
After graduating in 1996, Pavlenko joined the Mariinsky where she became a soloist in 1998 and a principal dancer in 2004.

In June 2000, Pavlenko hit the headlines when at short notice she danced the leading role in George Balanchine's Jewels (ballet) at London's Covent Garden. Her performance was all the more remarkable as she had less than a day to rehearse the part. Later that year, she also played the lead in Diamonds and Emeralds, becoming one of the few ballerinas to master all three roles.

In 2001, notable performances included Giselle and the Siren in Balanchine's The Prodigal Son. The following year she received the Golden Mask award in Moscow for performing the Snow Queen in Kirill Simonov's The Nutcracker. In 2003, as a guest with The Royal Ballet, she partnered Roberto Bolle as Nikiya in Natalia Makarova's La Bayadère. In 2006, she danced the title role in the Maki Asami production of Raymonda in Tokyo.

In addition to her Mariinsky partners, she has also danced with international stars including Nicolas Le Riche, Ethan Stiefel and Nikolay Tsiskaridze.

== Awards ==
Daria Pavlenko has received several awards including:

- 2000: Soul of Dance awarded by Ballet Magazine
- 2001: Golden Mask
- 2006: Leonid Massine Positano Dance Prize
- 2010: Honoured Artist of Russia
