= Days of Eclipse =

- Film poster
- Russian: Дни затмения
- Directed by: Alexander Sokurov
- Written by: Yuri Arabov; Pyotr Kadochnikov; Arkady and Boris Strugatsky
- Cinematography: Sergei Yurizditsky
- Edited by: Leda Semyonova
- Music by: Yuri Khanin (original score); Vladimir Persov (sound)
- Distributed by: Lenfilm; Troitskiy Most Studio; Prodimag (Spain, 2005 DVD)
- Release date: 1988
- Running time: 133 minutes
- Country: Soviet Union
- Languages: Russian; Turkmen; Italian

Days of Eclipse (Russian: Дни затмения, romanized: Dni zatmeniya) (or, The Days of Eclipse, Dni Zatmenija, Días de eclipse) is a 1988 Soviet film directed by Alexander Sokurov. The screenplay is by Yuri Arabov and Pyotr Kadochnikov based on a screenplay by Arkady and Boris Strugatsky, which is in turn based on their 1977 novel Definitely Maybe (За миллиард лет до конца света).

== Plot ==
A recently qualified medical doctor, Dmitri Malyanov, has taken a posting to a remote and very poor part of Soviet Turkmenistan. On top of his day job as a pediatrician Malyanov is undertaking research into the effects of religious practice on human health. His research has drawn the politically incorrect conclusion that religious faith does indeed improve health. However, as he attempts to write up his thesis, various sorts of improbable, bizarre events take place one after another. Malyanov perceives that some force is preventing him from completing his research.

== Production ==
In the novel, the protagonist who works on research in astrophysics is similarly confounded by a mysterious force trying to interfere and impede his research. Days of Eclipse is filmed using unusual cinematographic techniques in a half-documentary manner where black-and-white and sepia frames alternate with color. Sokurov chose for the film's location the town in Turkmenistan where he had spent his childhood as the son of an Army officer.

== Cast ==
The film features a cast of non-professionals.

- Aleksei Ananishnov as Malyanov
- Eskender Umarov as Vecherovsky
- Irina Sokolova as Malyanov's Sister
- Vladimir Zamansky as Snegovoy
- Kirill Dudkin as Gluchov
- Aleksei Yankovsky as Snegovoy's Father
- Viktor Belovolsky as Gubar
- Sergei Krylov as Little Boy

== Awards ==
- European Film Awards (Special Award for Best Music) of European Film Academy of 1988 to the composer Yuri Khanin
- Nika Award of the Union of Cinematographers of USSR for the best 1989 sound work to Vladimir Persov
- Composer Yuri Khanin was also nominated for 1989 Nika for the best music
