= Sentimental Value =

2025 film by Joachim Trier

- Norwegian theatrical release poster
- Norwegian: Affeksjonsverdi
- Directed by: Joachim Trier
- Written by: Eskil Vogt; Joachim Trier
- Produced by: Maria Ekerhovd; Andrea Berentsen Ottmar
- Starring: Renate Reinsve; Stellan Skarsgård; Inga Ibsdotter Lilleaas; Elle Fanning
- Cinematography: Kasper Tuxen Andersen
- Edited by: Olivier Bugge Coutté
- Music by: Hania Rani
- Production companies: Mer Film; Eye Eye Pictures; Lumen Production; MK Productions; Zentropa Entertainments; Zentropa Sweden; Komplizen Film; BBC Film; Arte France Cinéma; Film i Väst; Oslo Filmfond; Mediefondet Zefyr; Alaz Film; ZDF/Arte
- Distributed by: Nordisk Film (Norway, Denmark and Sweden); Memento Distribution (France); Plaion Pictures (Germany); Mubi (United Kingdom)
- Release dates: 21 May 2025 (Cannes); 20 August 2025 (France); 12 September 2025 (Norway); 3 October 2025 (Sweden); 26 December 2025 (United Kingdom)
- Running time: 133 minutes
- Countries: Norway; France; Germany; Denmark; Sweden; United Kingdom
- Languages: Norwegian; English; Swedish; Danish
- Budget: $7.8 million
- Box office: $23.8 million

Sentimental Value (Norwegian: Affeksjonsverdi) is a 2025 drama film directed by Joachim Trier, who co-wrote it with Eskil Vogt. It follows sisters Nora (Renate Reinsve) and Agnes (Inga Ibsdotter Lilleaas) in their reunion with their estranged father Gustav (Stellan Skarsgård), who is preparing to make his next film with young American actress Rachel (Elle Fanning).

The film premiered in the main competition of the 2025 Cannes Film Festival on 21 May, where it received widespread critical acclaim and won the Grand Prix. It was theatrically released in Norway on 12 September by Nordisk Film.

At the 83rd Golden Globe Awards, it was nominated for Best Motion Picture – Drama, and won Best Supporting Actor for Skarsgård. At the 98th Academy Awards, it received nine nominations, including Best Picture, Best Director, Best Actress (Reinsve), Best Supporting Actor (Skarsgård) and two Best Supporting Actress nominations (Fanning and Lilleaas), and became the first Norwegian film to win Best International Feature Film. It was also awarded the Nordic Council Film Prize in 2026.

== Plot ==
Film director Gustav Borg leaves Norway for Sweden after ending his troubled marriage with psychotherapist Sissel Borg, who continues to raise their daughters Nora and Agnes in their Oslo home, which Gustav's family has owned for generations. In adulthood, Agnes works as a historian and is married with a young son, Erik. Nora becomes a fairly successful stage actress, although she suffers from debilitating bouts of stage fright; she is having an affair with her married colleague, Jakob.

After Sissel's death, Gustav, whose career is on the decline as he struggles to secure funding for his projects, returns to Norway to reclaim the house. His daughters have grown to resent him for his extended absences, difficult personality and drinking problem, although Agnes is more sympathetic, and Erik is fond of him. Gustav's first film in 15 years is seemingly inspired by his mother Karin, a member of the Norwegian resistance who was tortured during the Nazi occupation and eventually committed suicide in the family home when Gustav was seven years old. Gustav proposes shooting the film in the actual home and hopes to recreate the suicide in the climactic scene. He asks Nora to play Karin, but Nora refuses to even read the script.

Gustav offers the role to American actress Rachel Kemp after meeting her at the Deauville American Film Festival. Kemp's star power convinces Netflix to finance the project, although Gustav openly resents working with the streamer. He is alarmed after discovering that his longtime cinematographer, Peter, is now frail and in poor health. Rachel, who does not speak Norwegian, grows increasingly uncertain about her fitness for the role. Nora is put off by the fact that Gustav treats Rachel with more empathy than his own daughters.

Jakob divorces his wife but refuses to commit to Nora. Gustav angers Nora by suggesting that her internal rage prevents her from finding love. Nora subsequently loses interest in her work and falls into a depression. Agnes is furious when Gustav casts Erik in the film without her permission, bitterly remarking that Gustav previously casting her in a film did not compensate for his general failures as a father. Rachel, ultimately convinced that the natural choice for her role remains Nora, exits the production. That evening, Gustav drinks himself into a stupor and is hospitalized the next day.

Agnes visits the National Archives of Norway and gains access to her grandmother's post-war statement about her torture. Sensing that Karin passed on her generational trauma to Gustav, Agnes reads Gustav's script. She realizes that while the film's plot is inspired by Karin, its emotional arc reflects his sincere regrets about his broken relationship with Nora. She is particularly shaken when finding out that Nora's own suicide attempt, which was never shared with Gustav, is depicted with striking similarity within the script. Agnes pushes Nora to read the script, which she finally does. Moved by a sense of mutual understanding, Nora agrees to join the film.

In order to finance the film, Gustav sells the family home, which is shown with new furnishings in a more modern style. Some time later, production moves forward with the filming taking place on a sound stage replicating the home and Peter as the cinematographer. Nora performs the climactic scene with Erik acting as her son. After the final take, she exchanges an understanding look with her father.

== Cast ==
- Renate Reinsve as Nora Borg, an actress from Oslo
- Stellan Skarsgård as Gustav Borg, a celebrated film director and Nora and Agnes's father
- Inga Ibsdotter Lilleaas as Agnes Borg Pettersen, Nora's sister
- Elle Fanning as Rachel Kemp, a famous American actress hired to play the lead in Gustav's new film
- Anders Danielsen Lie as Jakob, Nora's theater colleague and romantic interest
- Jesper Christensen as Michael, Gustav's producer
- Lena Endre as Ingrid Berger
- Cory Michael Smith as Sam, Rachel's colleague
- Catherine Cohen as Nicky, Rachel's colleague
- Andreas Stoltenberg Granerud as Even Pettersen, Agnes's husband
- Øyvind Hesjedal Loven as Erik, Agnes and Even's son
- Lars Väringer as Peter, Gustav's retired cinematographer
- Marianne Vassbotn Klasson as Sissel Borg, Gustav's ex-wife and Nora and Agnes's mother

== Production ==
Trier and his longtime collaborator Eskil Vogt began writing Sentimental Value in summer 2022. The film is in part informed by Trier's own family history: his maternal grandfather, filmmaker Erik Løchen, was involved in the Norwegian resistance as a university student during the Second World War and became traumatized by his ten-month captivity in two different concentration camps. Norwegian actress Bente Børsum, who provided the voiceover narration for the film, coincidentally played the lead in Løchen's 1960 debut feature The Chasers. Trier and Vogt both cited Martin Scorsese's The Age of Innocence (1993) as a major source of influence on the film.

Principal photography commenced in August 2024 in Oslo, lasting 63 days until late November. A dragestil villa in Oslo's Frogner neighborhood was chosen to stand in for the Borg residence following a one-year search. The production filmed on location using the real villa's exterior and first-floor interiors, while the bedrooms and second floor were reconstructed at a studio in Drammen using LED walls as backdrops, enabling the team to adapt the setting to changing seasons and decades. Filming also took place on stage at the National Theatre. Key scenes depicting Skarsgård, Fanning and Cory Michael Smith's characters attending the Deauville American Film Festival were shot on location in Deauville, France, while additional interior scenes were filmed in Strömstad, Sweden.

Danish cinematographer Kasper Tuxen mainly shot the production in 35mm using Arricam LT cameras with Cooke and Super Baltar lenses, with flashback scenes set in the 1920s and 1930s shot in 16mm using Arriflex 416 cameras. The film marks Tuxen's second collaboration with Trier, following 2021's The Worst Person in the World.

=== Music ===
The music for the film was composed by Polish composer Hania Rani, in her first film scoring stint. The soundtrack, Sentimental Value, was released by Gondwana Records on 6 February 2026 in digital formats. A vinyl edition is scheduled to be released on 22 May 2026.

== Release ==
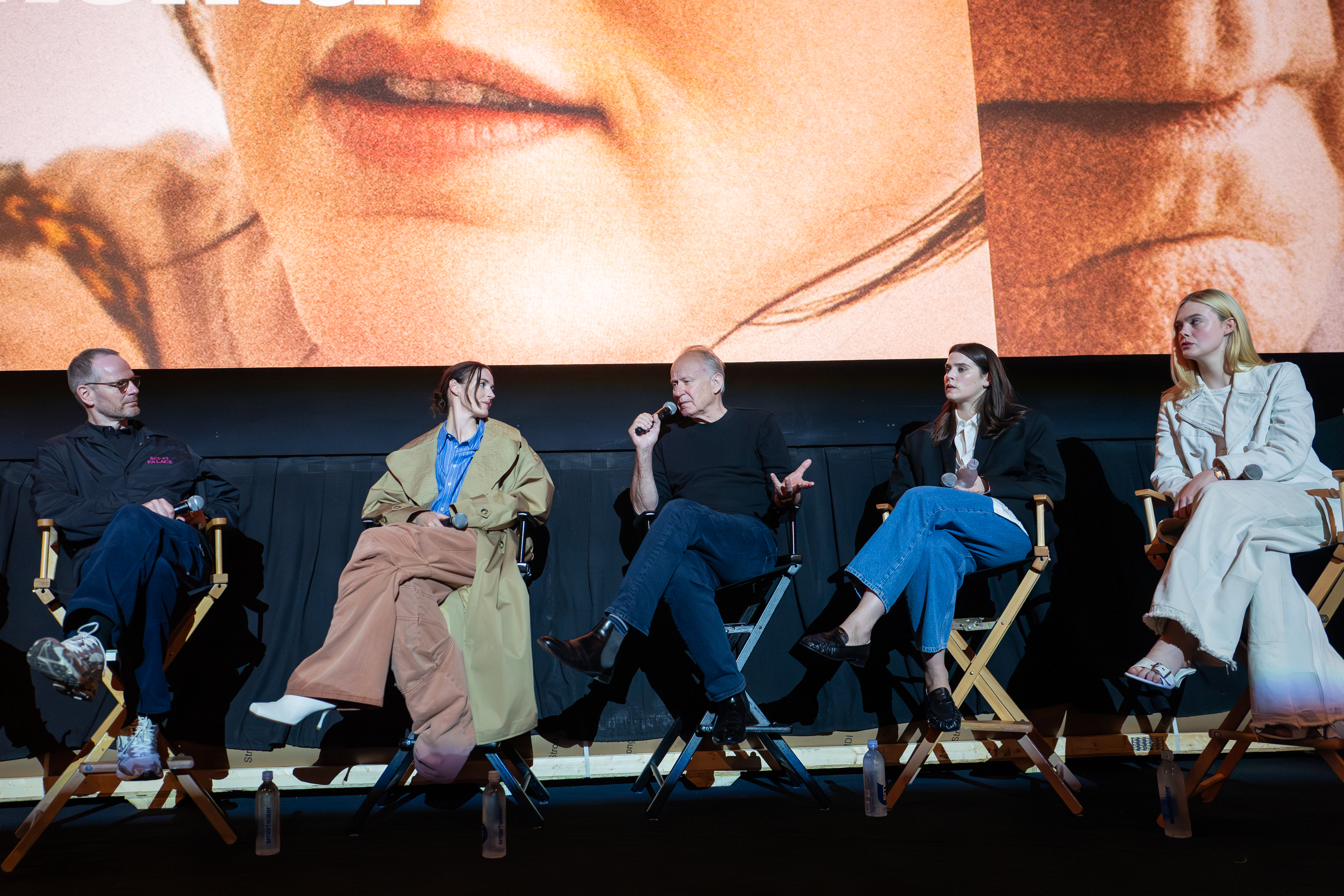
L–R: Director Joachim Trier, and actors Renate Reinsve, Stellan Skarsgård, Inga Ibsdotter Lilleaas and Elle Fanning at a Q&A for the film in New York City in 2025

On 10 April 2025, Sentimental Value was announced to be competing for the Palme d'Or at the 2025 Cannes Film Festival, where it had its world premiere on 21 May 2025 and received a 19-minute standing ovation, winning the Grand Prix. On 1 July, the trailer was released. The second trailer was released on 28 October.

Neon bought the distribution rights for North America in May 2024 at the Cannes Film Festival when the film was first announced. In April 2025, Mubi announced that they had acquired rights to the film for the United Kingdom, Ireland, Latin America, Turkey, and India. It was also screened in the Open Air Premiere Programme at the 31st Sarajevo Film Festival in August 2025, and as a Headline Gala at the 69th BFI London Film Festival in October 2025.

It was released in France on 20 August 2025 by Memento Distribution. It was released in the United States on 7 November 2025 by Neon. It was released in Spain on 5 December 2025 by Elastica and in the United Kingdom on 26 December by Mubi.

In North America, the film was released on DVD, Blu-ray, and Ultra HD Blu-ray on May 26, 2026, by The Criterion Collection.

== Reception ==
=== Critical response ===
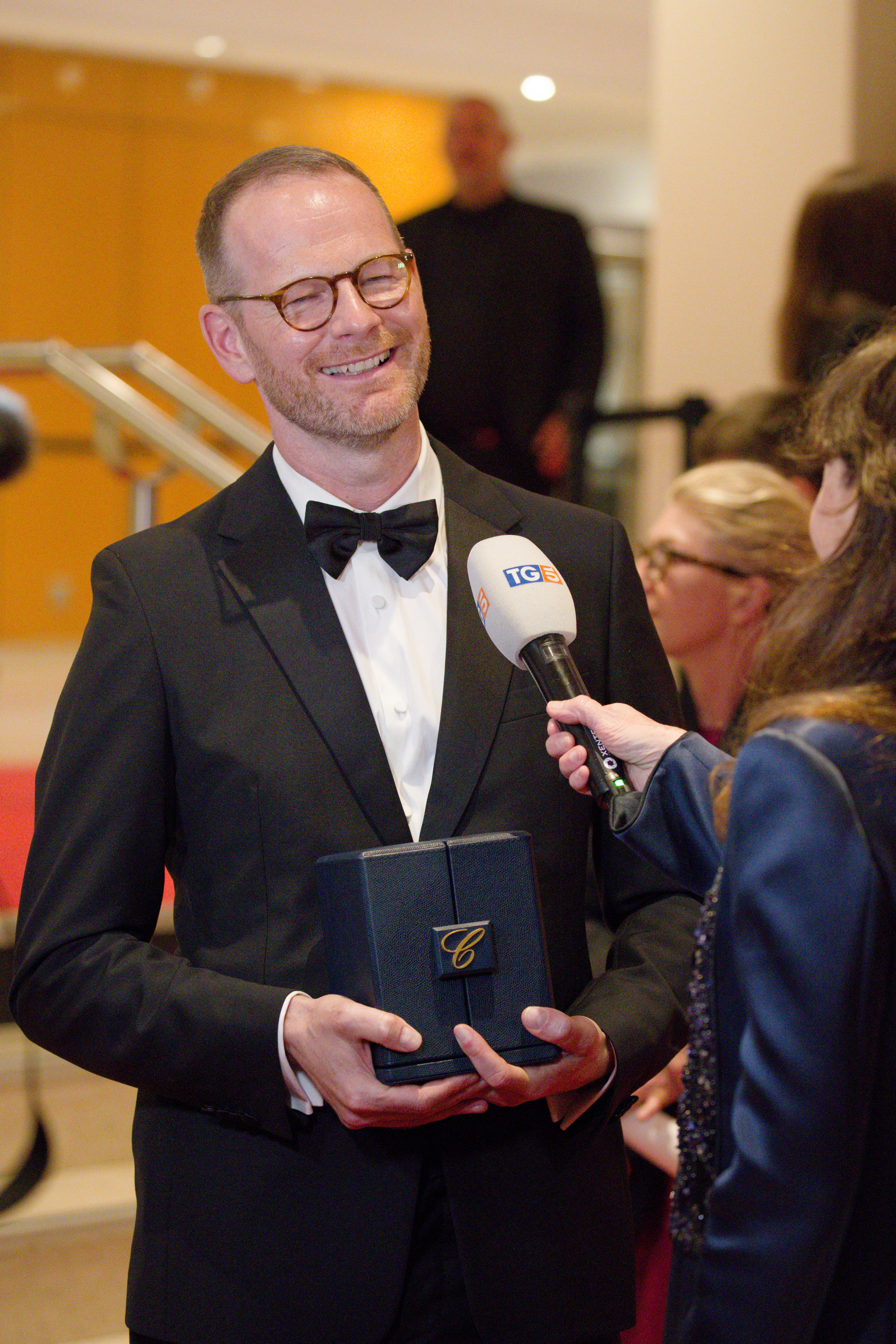
Joachim Trier received widespread acclaim for his direction and screenplay, and won the Grand Prix at the 2025 Cannes Film Festival.

Upon release, Sentimental Value received highly positive reviews from critics. On the review aggregator website Rotten Tomatoes, 95% of 253 critics' reviews are positive, with an average rating of 8.6/10. The website's consensus reads: "Deftly exploring the uneasy tension between artistic expression and personal connection, Sentimental Value is a bracingly mature work from writer-director Joachim Trier that's marvelously acted across the board." Metacritic, which uses a weighted average, assigned the film a score of 86 out of 100, based on 45 critics, indicating "universal acclaim".

In June 2025, IndieWire ranked the film at number 21 on its list of "The 100 Best Movies of the 2020s (So Far)".

=== Year-end lists ===
According to CriticsTop10.com, Sentimental Value appeared on 89 critics' annual "best-of" lists in 2025 .

- 3rd – David Ehrlich (IndieWire)
- 3rd – Owen Gleiberman (Variety)
- 3rd – Ann Hornaday (The Washington Post)
- 4th – Lindsey Bahr (AP News)
- 4th – Jack Coyle (AP News)
- 4th – IndieWire Critics Poll
- 6th – The Hollywood Reporter
- 6th – Peter Travers (The Travers Take)
- 7th – Sheri Linden (The Hollywood Reporter)
- 8th – Nicholas Barber and Caryn James (BBC)
- 8th – Nick Chen (Dazed)
- 10th – David Fear (Rolling Stone)
- Listed alphabetically, not ranked – Chris Murphy (Vanity Fair)
- Listed alphabetically, not ranked – Dana Stevens (Slate)

== Accolades ==
At the 83rd Golden Globe Awards, it was nominated for Best Motion Picture – Drama, and won Best Supporting Actor for Skarsgård. At the 98th Academy Awards, it received nine nominations, including Best Picture, Best Director, Best Actress (Reinsve), Best Supporting Actor (Skarsgård) and two Best Supporting Actress nominations (Fanning and Lilleaas), and became the first Norwegian film to win Best International Feature Film. It was awarded the Nordic Council Film Prize in October 2026.

== See also ==
- List of Cannes Film Festival records § Longest standing ovations
- List of submissions to the 98th Academy Awards for Best International Feature Film
- List of Norwegian submissions for the Academy Award for Best International Feature Film
- List of Nordic Academy Award winners and nominees
