= Nina Ananiashvili =

Georgian ballerina and artistic director

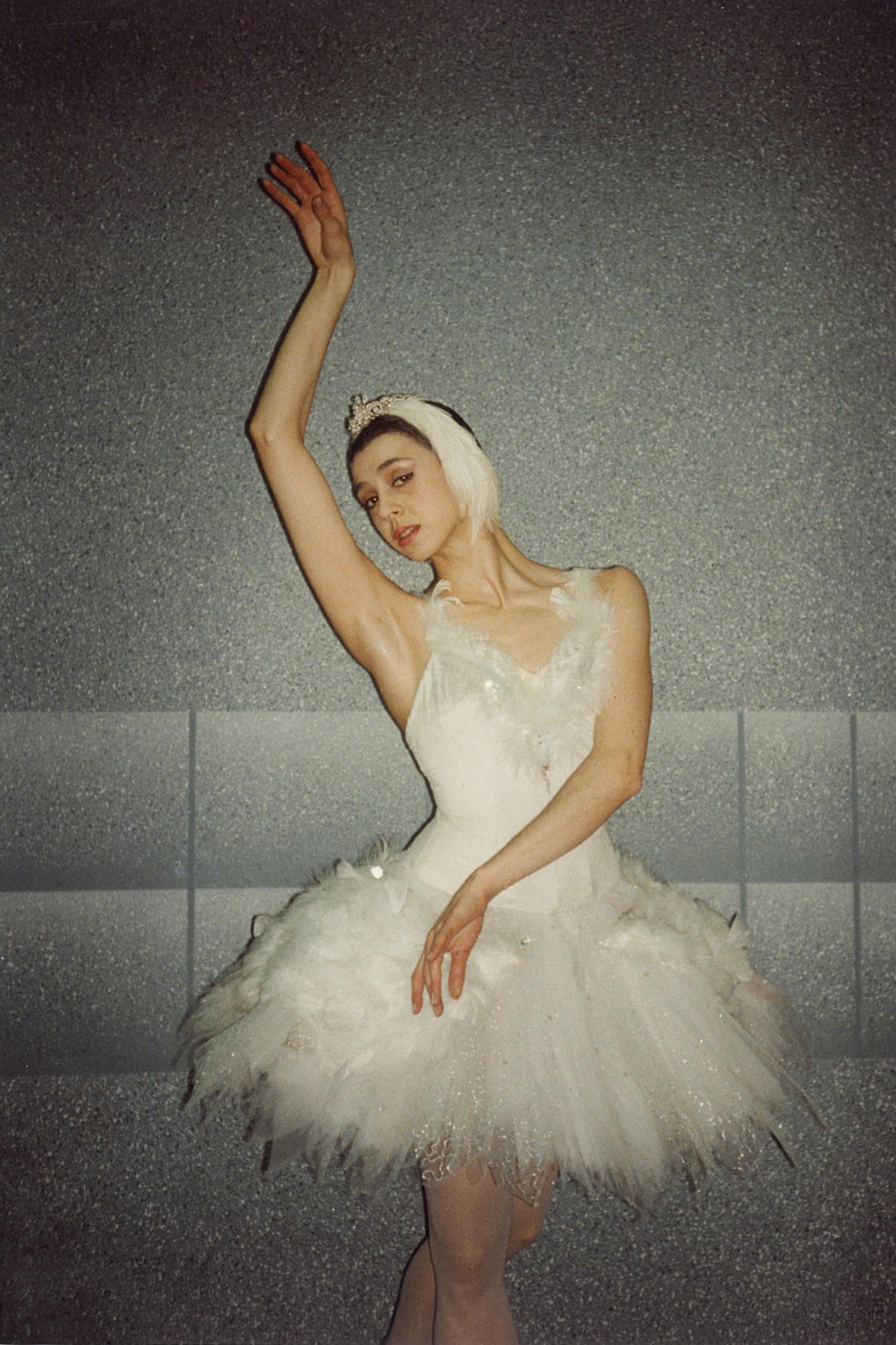
- Born: ნინო ანანიაშვილი Nino Ananiashvili; March 19, 1963 (age 63); Tbilisi, Georgian SSR, USSR
- Occupation: Ballet dancer
- Years active: 1981–present
- Spouse: Grigol Vashadze (m. 1988–present)
- Children: 2
- Dancing career
- Current group: State Ballet of Georgia
- Former groups: Bolshoi Ballet; American Ballet Theatre; Houston Ballet
- Dances: Tbilisi, Georgia

Nina Ananiashvili (born Nino Ananiashvili; Georgian: ნინო ანანიაშვილი; born March 19, 1963) is a Georgian ballerina and artistic director of the State Ballet of Georgia. She has been described by the Daily Telegraph as one of the twelve greatest ballerinas of all time, and in 2002 was named Best Ballerina of the Year by the US Dance Magazine. Ananiashvili has been a prominent fixture of the Soviet, Russian and Georgian ballet scene for decades. Shortly before the fall of the Iron Curtain, in 1987 a New York Magazine critic praised her as "the best thing about the Bolshoi's Giselle whether she appeared in the title role or as the queen of the wilis." In 2014, a film of her 1991 performance in Giselle with the Bolshoi ballet was released.

== Early life and training ==
Nina Ananiashvili was born in Tbilisi, Georgian SSR. Her father, Gedevan, and two older brothers, George and Levan, were all geologists; her mother, Lia Gogolashvili, a philologist. She was a sickly child and at the age of 4, her parents started her ice skating in an effort to improve her health. At 10, she became champion in her age group in Georgia.

A dance teacher saw how she moved on the ice – in particular her balance and how she used her arms – and had her perform The Dying Swan on skates. Then the teacher took Nina to a theatre and showed her the feathered costume she could wear if she performed it on stage, just like Maya Plisetskaya, the Bolshoi prima ballerina.

In 1969, Ananiashvili entered the Georgia State Choreographic Institute. Tamara Vykhodtseva was her first teacher there. The great Vakhtang Chabukiani also took little Nina under his wing. Her progress was so impressive that it drew the attention of teachers from the Moscow Choreographic Institute, who convinced her parents to allow Nina to continue her studies there. In 1976, she entered the Moscow Choreographic Institute where her main teacher was Natalia Zolotova. In 1980, she made her stage debut in a school production of Coppélia. She graduated and entered the Bolshoi Theater in 1981.

== Ballet career ==
At the Bolshoi Theatre, Nina was taught by two of the greatest teachers in the Soviet Union, Raisa Struchkova and Marina Semenova. In 1982, although still a corps member, she danced her first principal role with the company, as Odette/Odile in Swan Lake, during a tour of Germany. That year, she made her first appearance with a foreign ballet company, the Alberta Ballet of Canada. In 1983 she was promoted to the rank of soloist and performed in her native Tbilisi as a professional for the first time. Eventually she rose to become a prima ballerina. She, along with Andris Liepa, was the first Soviet dancer to appear as a guest performer with the New York City Ballet in 1988 (she had danced in "Raymonda Variations", "Apollo" and "Symphony in C" there). In subsequent years, Nina Ananiashvili became an international ballet superstar. Ananiashvili also had the honor of being the first Soviet ballerina to perform with the Royal Danish Ballet, and it was considered a particular triumph that she danced in such pieces as La Sylphide and Napoli, by the Danish master August Bournonville, who is considered a national treasure by many.

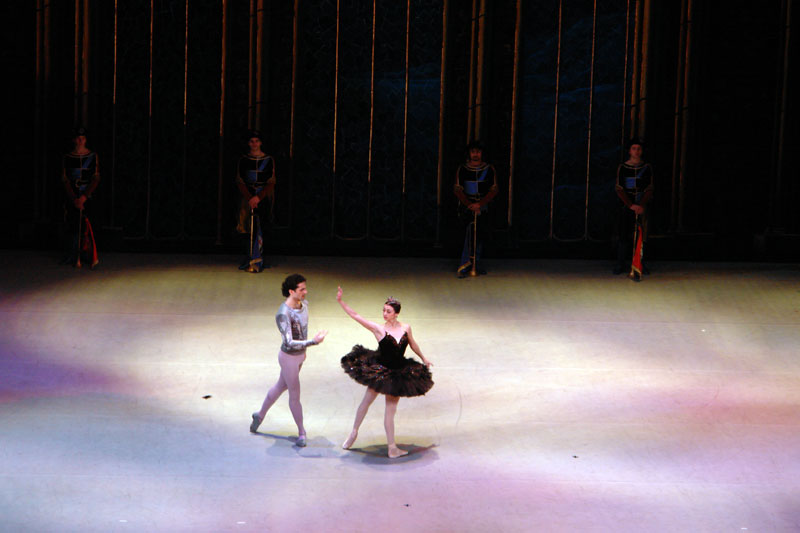
Ananiashvili as Odile in Swan Lake

During her career she had performed in many ballet theaters in various countries (in most of the places she performed as a guest artist): Bulgaria, Denmark, Argentina, Finland, Georgia, Germany, Hungary Italy, Japan, Monaco, Norway, Portugal, Russia, Serbia, Sweden, the United Kingdom and the United States of America. In 1986, after a long interval caused by a strain in international relations, the Bolshoi dancers were allowed to tour the West once again. Ananiashvili's London performance of Raymonda was greeted with delight by both the public and the critics. That year was a turning point in her career. She was permitted to accept guest performances outside the Soviet Union since 1986 due to the policies of Mikhail Gorbachev (see Perestroika and Glasnost).

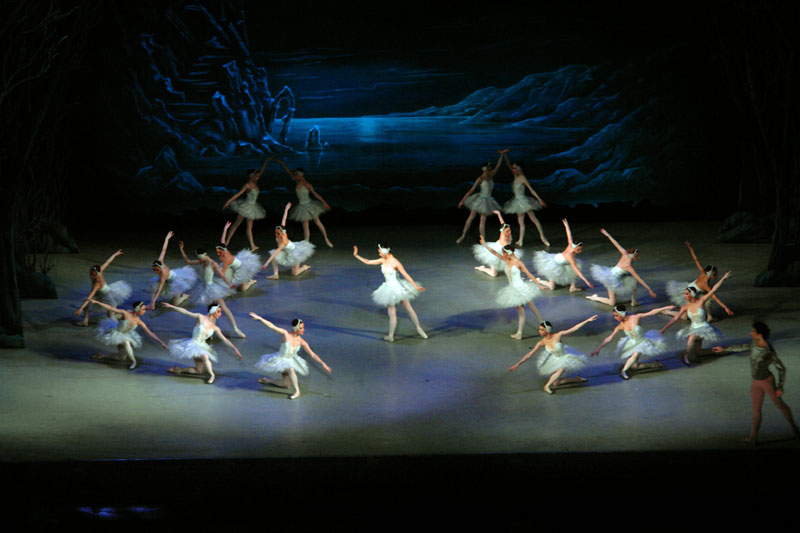
Ananiashvili as Odette in Swan Lake.

She performed well in several competitions: in 1980 she won the gold medal in the junior group of the 10th International Ballet Competition in Varna, Bulgaria; in 1981 she and Andris Liepa won Grand Prix in the junior group of the 4th International Ballet Competition in Moscow (Andris Liepa received the Gold Medal there). In 1985 she won the gold medal in the senior group at the 5th International Ballet Competition in Moscow; in 1986 she and Andris Liepa were awarded the Grand Prix at the 3rd USA International Ballet Competition in Jackson, Mississippi, United States.

She became a principal dancer for the American Ballet Theatre in 1993, and in 1999 she joined the Houston Ballet with that same rank. She made her debut with the Boston Ballet in that company's Russian-American production of Swan Lake. Accomplished style and rare dramatic talent have made Nina Ananiashvili one of the mostly well known dancers of modern times. Pledging government support, the newly appointed Georgian president Mikheil Saakashvili asked Ananiashvili to rebuild the company in an effort to bolster national pride. She agreed and left Russia (and eventually the Bolshoi Ballet), to move back to Tbilisi.

Since September 2004, she has been artistic director of the National Ballet Ensemble of Georgia. Attracting help from many former colleagues and adding extensively to the company's repertoire, Ananiashvili has greatly revitalized the State Ballet. Since 2006, she has acted as a United Nations National Goodwill Ambassador for Millennium Development Goals.

== Personal life ==
Ananiashvili was married, in 1988, to Grigol Vashadze, a Georgian diplomat. They have one daughter, Elene.

On November 23, 2006, she became the Godmother of Nikoloz Saakashvili, younger son of the Georgian President Mikheil Saakashvili, together with Ukrainian President Viktor Yushchenko who became the Godfather of the child.

== Awards ==
- People's Artist of the Georgian SSR (1989)
- Russian Independent National Award "Triumph" (the first time a dancer was honoured), 1991.
- National Shota Rustaveli Award, Georgia, 1993.
- People's Artist of Russia (17 March 1995) - for the great achievements in art

2000: "Woman of the Year" (International Biographical Institute)*Order of Merit for the Fatherland, 4th class (22 March 2001) - for outstanding contribution to the development of national music and theatre "Dance Magazine" Award, 2002.

- "Ballet" Magazine Award Soul of the Dance (category Queen of the Dance), 2003.*Order of Honour (Georgia) (22 January 2003)

2003: "Medal of Honor" (Georgia's highest order).

- Presidential Order of Light (Georgia, 26 May 2010)
