= Definitely Maybe (novel) =

1977 novel by Arkady and Boris Strugatsky

- Author: Arkady and Boris Strugatsky
- Original title: За миллиард лет до конца света
- Language: Russian
- Genre: Science fiction, paranoid fiction
- Publisher: Macmillan
- Publication date: 1977
- Publication place: Soviet Union
- English publication date: 1978
- Pages: 143
- ISBN: 0-02-615180-4

Definitely Maybe (Russian: За миллиард лет до конца света, romanized: Za milliard let do kontsa sveta, literal translation: A Billion Years Before the End of the World, sometimes called Definitely Maybe: A Manuscript Discovered Under Unusual Circumstances) is a science fiction novel by Russian writers Arkady and Boris Strugatsky, first published 1977.

== Plot summary ==
The story takes place in Leningrad, USSR, apparently in the 1970s.

The protagonist, Dmitry Alekseyevich Malyanov (Дмитрий Алексеевич Малянов) is an astrophysicist who, while officially on vacation, continues to work on his thesis, "The Interaction of Stars with Diffused Galactic Matter". Just as he begins to realize that he is on the verge of a revolutionary discovery, his life becomes plagued by strange events.

First, Malyanov is visited unexpectedly by an attractive woman claiming to be his wife's classmate and food and wine arrive for them mysteriously and already paid for. Then his neighbor dies of an apparent suicide and Malyanov becomes the murder suspect.

Approaching the problem with a scientific mindset, Malyanov suspects that his discovery is in the way of someone (or something) intent on preventing the completion of his work. The same idea occurs to his friends and acquaintances, who find themselves in a similar impasse—some powerful, mysterious, and very selective force impedes their work in fields ranging from biology to mathematical linguistics.

An explanation is proposed by Malyanov's friend and neighbor, the mathematician Vecherovsky (Вечеровский). He posits that the mysterious force is the Universe's reaction to mankind's scientific pursuit, which threatens to destroy the very fabric of the universe in some distant future. His hypothesis is that of a Homeostatic Universe, meaning that the Universe tends to conserve both its total entropy (a measure of disorder) and the capacity of regeneration of reasoning performed into it. The equilibrium between the two measures determines the structure of the Universe at a given time. Thus, the Universe naturally resists attempts of rational beings of constructing supercivilizations. Vecherovsky proposes to treat this universal resistance to scientific progress as a natural phenomenon which can and should be investigated and even harnessed by Science.

As the novel concludes, the other scientists, including Malyanov, have decided to abandon their research due to the pressure, and Vecherovsky remains alone to battle the universe and continue their work.

== Derived works ==
Aleksandr Sokurov's movie Days of Eclipse is loosely based on the novel.

The Finnish film Miljardi vuotta ennen maailmanloppua ("One Billion Years Before the End of the World") was directed by Tapio Suominen in 1986 based on the novel.

== In real life ==
Mathematician Vladimir Voevodsky had described himself as having similar experiences at one period of his life:

С июня 2006 года по ноябрь 2007 я не занимался математикой совсем. ... Сейчас, думая о том, что со мной происходило в это время, я часто вспоминаю повесть А. и Б. Стругацких "За миллиард лет до конца света".

From June 2006 to November 2007 I did not study mathematics at all. ... Now, thinking about what happened to me during this time, I often recall the story by A. and B. Strugatsky "A Billion Years Before the End of the World"

The character of Vecherovsky is loosely based on the well-known mathematician Yuri Manin.

== Reception ==
Leszek Bugajski reviewed the Polish translation of the novel for "Fantastyka" (8/84, p. 53)
