= Hania Rani =

Polish pianist, composer and singer (born 1990)

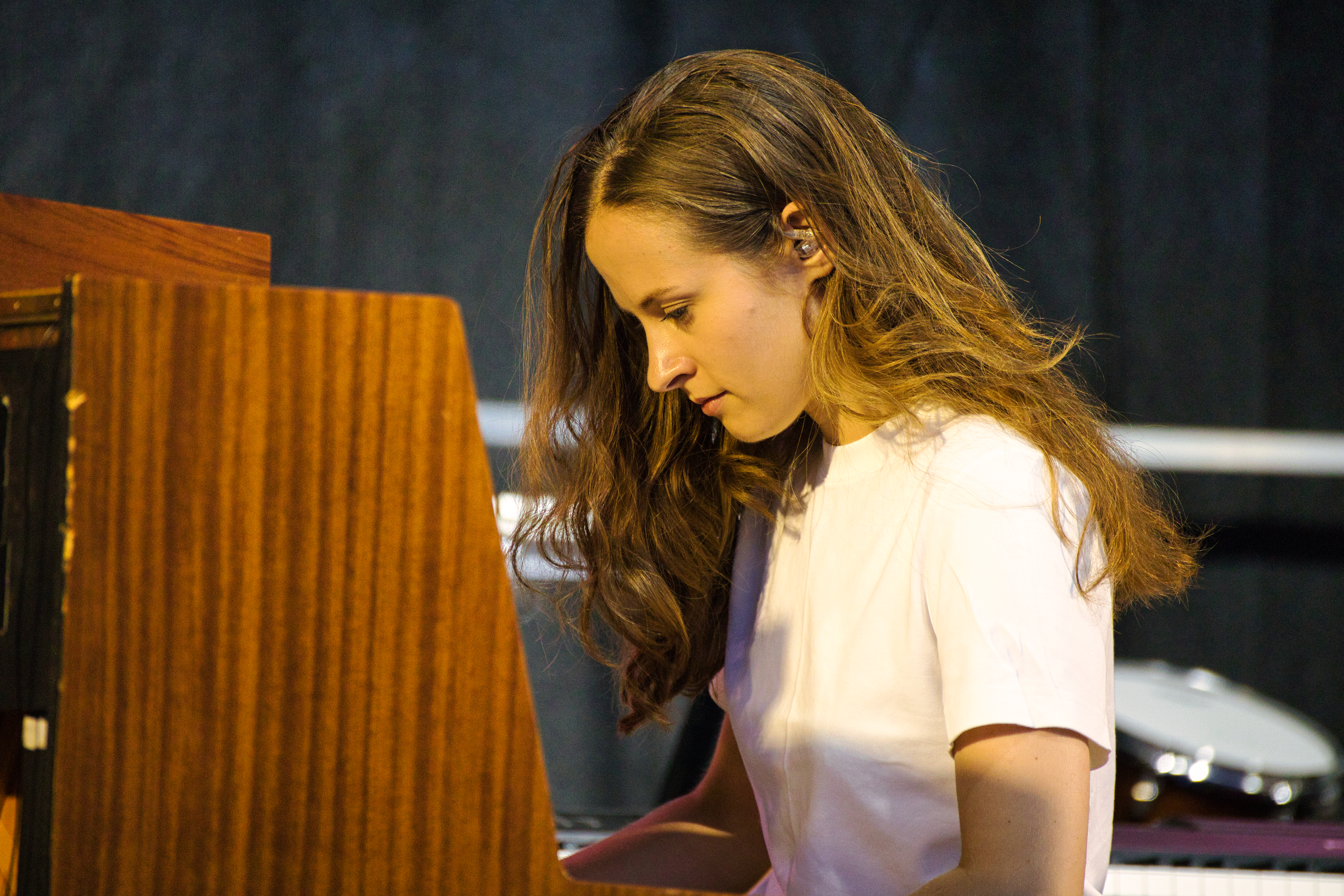
- Rani performing in 2021

Background information
- Born: Hanna Raniszewska; 1990 (age 35–36); Gdańsk, Poland
- Genres: Neo-classical
- Instruments: Piano; synthesizer; vocals
- Years active: 2015–present
- Labels: Deutsche Grammophon; Gondwana
- Website: haniarani.com

Hania Rani (born Hanna Raniszewska in 1990) is a Polish pianist, composer and singer.

== Early life and education ==
Rani was born in Gdańsk to parents who are a doctor and an architect. She studied music at the Feliks Nowowiejski Music School in Gdańsk, Fryderyk Chopin University of Music in Warsaw, and the Hochschule für Musik Hanns Eisler in Berlin.

== Career ==
Trained as a classical pianist, Rani began incorporating jazz into her work during music school. In 2015, she collaborated with Dobrawa Czocher on the album Biała Flaga, featuring their arrangements of music by Grzegorz Ciechowski. During the COVID-19 pandemic, Rani started experimenting with improvisation and composing. She has blurred traditional distinctions between jazz, classical and house music.

In 2023, she won the Paszport Polityki award in the "popular music" category.

In 2024, ITV, one of the UK's leading broadcasters, commissioned a piece by Rani for the opening credits of their football coverage for the England national football team on ITV Sport.

Rani announced her first piano concerto, Non Fiction, composed partially in response to the discovery in 2020 of the compositions of a young music prodigy, Josima Feldschuh, written during the horrors of World War II in the Warsaw Ghetto. It was recorded in Abbey Road Studios and was released on Decca Records. As of 2025, Rani has won seven Fryderyk Awards.

In 2026, Rani won the European Film Award for Best Composer for her original score for the film Sentimental Value.

On 8 June 2026, Rani performed at the Grand Theatre – National Opera in Warsaw at the opening concert of the Ephemera festival, where she gave the Polish premiere of her piece Shining, inspired by the music of Steve Reich and Philip Glass, performed with the Hashtag Ensemble. After the concert she was awarded the Silver Gloria Artis Medal for Merit to Culture by the Minister of Culture and National Heritage, Marta Cienkowska.

== Discography ==
Title	Album details	Peak chart positions				Certifications
Title	Album details	BEL (FL) Classic	BEL (WA) Classic	GER	UK	Certifications
Esja	Released: 5 April 2019; Label: Gondwana Records; Format: Digital download, CD, LP	—	—	—	65	ZPAV: Gold
Home	Released: 29 May 2020; Label: Gondwana Records; Format: Digital download, CD, LP	—	—	—	—	
Music for Film and Theatre	Released: 18 June 2021; Label: Gondwana Records; Format: Digital download, CD, LP	—	—	—	—	
Inner Symphonies (with Dobrawa Czocher)	Released: 15 October 2021; Label: Deutsche Grammophon; Format: Digital download, CD, LP	—	—	68	—	
On Giacometti	Released: 17 February 2023; Format: Digital download, CD, LP	—	—	—	—	
Ghosts	Released: 6 October 2023; Label: Gondwana Records; Format: Digital download, CD, LP	—	—	52	—	
Nostalgia	Released: 27 September 2024; Label: Gondwana Records; Format: Digital download, CD, LP	—	—	—	—	
Non Fiction - Piano Concerto in Four Movements	Released: 14 November 2025; Label: Decca Records (USA); Format: Digital download, CD, LP	4	5	—	—	
"—" denotes a recording that did not chart or was not released in that territory.
