= Entr'acte =

Piece of music performed between acts of a theatrical production

Entr'acte (or entracte, French pronunciation: [ɑ̃tʁakt]; German: Zwischenspiel and Zwischenakt, Italian: intermezzo, Spanish: intermedio and intervalo) means 'between the acts'. It can mean a pause between two parts of a stage production, synonymous to an intermission (this is nowadays the more common meaning in French), but it more often (in English) indicates a piece of music performed between acts of a theatrical production. But despite this, an entr'acte is often paired with a longer intermission, as an intermission is usually "between acts." However, there can also be an entr'acte on its own, usually between the two acts without an intermission.

In the case of stage musicals or operas, the entr'acte serves as the overture of act 2 (and sometimes acts 3 and 4, as in Carmen). In films that were meant to be shown with an intermission, there was frequently a specially recorded entr'acte on the soundtrack between the first and second half of the film, although this practice eventually died out.

== Origin ==
Originally entr'actes resulted from stage curtains being closed for set or costume changes: to fill time as not to halt the dramatic action, to make a transition from the mood of one act to the next, or to prevent the public from becoming restless. In front of the closed curtains, the action could be continued during these entr'actes, albeit involving only players with no scenery other than the curtain, and a minimum of props.

An entr'acte can take the action from one part of a large-scale drama to the next by completing the missing links. The Spanish Sainete often performed a similar function.

== Role of music ==
In traditional theatre, incidental music could also bridge the "closed curtain" periods: ballet, opera and drama each have a rich tradition of such musical interludes. The literal meaning of the German word Verwandlungsmusik refers to its original function – "change music". Eventually, entr'actes (or intermezzi) would develop into a separate genre of short theatrical realizations (often with a plot completely independent from the main piece) that could be produced with a minimum of requisites during intermissions of other elaborate theatre pieces. These later entr'actes were distinctly intended to break the action or mood with something different, such as comedy or dance. Such pieces also allowed the chief players of the main piece to have a break. Eventually the idea of being an insert into a greater whole became looser: interlude sometimes has no other connotation than a "short play".

== Other dramatic devices ==
When the insert was intended only to shift the mood before returning to the main action, without a change of scene being necessary, authors could revert to a "play within a play" technique, or have some accidental guests in a ballroom perform a dance, etc. In this case the insert is a divertimento (the term is Italian; the French divertissement is also used) rather than an entr'acte.

In the French opera tradition of the end of the 17th century and early 18th century (Jean-Philippe Rameau, for example) such divertissements would become compulsory in the form of an inserted ballet passage, a tradition that continued until well into the 19th century. This was eventually parodied by Jacques Offenbach: for example, the cancan ending Orpheus in the Underworld.

By the middle of the 18th century, a divertimento had become a separate genre of light music as well. These divertimenti could be used as interludes in stage works, many of the divertimenti composed in the last half of the 18th century appear to have lost the relation to the theatre, the music in character only having to be a "diversion" in one or another way.

== Examples ==
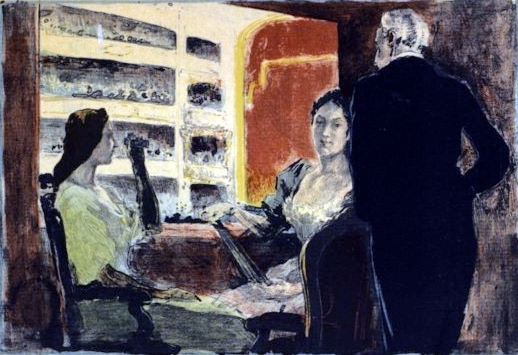
Pendant l'entracte (During the entr'acte): lithography by Alexandre Lunois published in L'Artiste (1894).

Some more or less elaborate or independent entr'actes or intermezzi became famous in their own right, in some cases eclipsing the theatre productions for which they were originally written:

- La serva padrona, a two-act opera buffa by Pergolesi, was intended to break the seriousness of his opera seria Il prigioner superbo (1733). Eventually the intermezzo got more attention than the large-scale work to which it was added (see Querelle des Bouffons).
- Mozart shows his mastery in the finale of the first act of Don Giovanni, where he mixes the divertimento-like dancing (accompanied by a small ensemble on the scene) with the actual singing. The characters mingle, performing light dances, while they are supposed to be chasing each other for murder and rape. The diversion and the drama become a single multi-layered item.
- Helmina von Chézy's play Rosamunde, with music by Franz Schubert, has two famous entr'actes. The third entr'acte in B♭ major, the Andantino, is famous for its idyllic melody, similar to Beethoven's Seventh Symphony, which has been used in two of Schubert's other works, while the first entr'acte in B minor is a suspected finale to his Eighth "Unfinished" Symphony.
- Bizet's opera Carmen has entr'actes before acts 2, 3 and 4; the one before act 3, featuring flute and harp, is often played in concert performances.
- A comparable 'filmic' interlude was foreseen in the early 1930s by Alban Berg for his opera Lulu, between the two scenes of the central act. In this case Berg only composed the music and gave a short schematic scenario for a film, that was not yet realised when he died in 1935. The Lulu interlude film, in contrast to the previous example, was intended to chain the action between the first and second half of the opera. Because of the completely symmetrical structure of this opera, the filmic interlude of Lulu is, in a manner of speaking, the axis of the opera.
- Interludes of the divertimento kind can be found in Leoš Janáček's last, sombre opera From the House of the Dead (1928): releasing the tension after Skuratov's disheartening tale at the centre of the second act, two an "opera" and a "pantomime" within the larger opera are executed consecutively by a cast of prisoners, both presentations farcical variations on the Don Juan theme, and mirroring the religious ceremony divertimento before the Skuratov tale.
- Also, the first publicly performed furniture music composed by Erik Satie was premiered as entr'acte music (1920 – the play for which it was written fell into oblivion), with this variation that it was intended as background music to the sounds the public would usually produce at intermission, walking around and talking. Allegedly, the public did not obey Satie's intention: they kept silently in their places and listened, trained by a habit of incidental music, much to the frustration of the avant-garde musicians, who tried to save their idea by inciting the public to get up, talk, and walk around.
- Most of the film adaptations of Broadway musicals feature entr'actes during the intermission, which make use of music from the production.
- Many roadshow presentations of films from the 1950s through to the 1970s were provided with entr'actes that took the form of overtures to the second part, including most of the adaptations of Broadway musicals released at that time, but the practice soon spread to drama films. In many cases it was the same piece as was used for the entr'acte (as in Lawrence of Arabia in 1962 and 2001: A Space Odyssey in 1968), but others such as Ben-Hur (1959) and How the West Was Won (1962) employ different pieces.

Doctor Zhivago,

- The 1965 film adaptation The Sound of Music
- The 1968 British-American film Chitty Chitty Bang Bang
- The 1970 film Tora! Tora! Tora!
- The 2005 film Kingdom of Heaven, in the roadshow form of its director's cut, features a 158-second entr'acte that includes a performance of Wall Breached by Harry Gregson-Williams.
- Roadshow releases of the 2015 film The Hateful Eight were provided with an original orchestral overture composed by Ennio Morricone, but unusually for any media used a Crystal Gayle performance of the country song "Ready for the Times to Get Better" as the entr'acte.
- The 2016 Dream Theater album The Astonishing features an entr'acte track entitled "2285 Entr'acte" which bridges the first and second acts of the album.
