= Boris Yoffe =

Russian-born Israeli composer

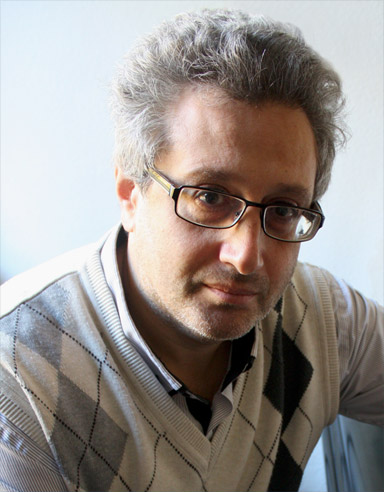
- Karlsruhe, nov. 2014.

Background information
- Born: Борис Иоффе; December 21, 1968 (age 56); Leningrad, USSR (Russia)
- Genres: symphonic, chamber, opera
- Occupation(s): Composer, writer
- Instrument(s): Violin, viola, piano
- Years active: 1991 - present
- Website: Official website

Boris Yoffe (Russian: Борис Иоффе, Hebrew: בוריס יופה; born 21 December 1968 in St. Petersburg) is a Russian-born Israeli composer, resident of Karlsruhe, Germany.

== Biography ==
Boris Yoffe initially studied violin but turned to composing early, premiering his first works in the St. Petersburg Philharmonic in 1983.

He emigrated to Israel before the break-up of Soviet Union and completed his composition studies at the Rubin Academy of Music at Tel Aviv University. Later he moved to Karlsruhe, Germany to study with Wolfgang Rihm in 1997. Yoffe was a scholarship holder from various foundations; In 2000 he received the prize from the Bavarian Academy of Fine Arts.

Around that time, the composer began composing a series of short one-page pieces for string quartet. These were given a performance at ZKM in Karlsruhe in May 2003 and recorded on the ECM label by the Rosamunde Quartett with the Hilliard Ensemble. Boris Yoffe himself considers his work not specifically national: Russian, Israeli or German, but in principle ″belonging to all three cultures″.

Yoffe is also the author of numerous arrangements and arrangements as well as several musicological and philosophical essays.
