= European Film Award for Best Supporting Performance =

European film award

The European Film Award for Best Supporting Actress was awarded by the European Film Academy to actor or actress of European language films.

== Winners and nominees ==
=== 1980s ===
Year	Winner and nominees	Film
1988 (2nd)	no award given European Film Award for Best Supporting Actress; European Film Award for Best Supporting Actor	
1989 (2nd)	(United Kingdom) Edna Doré	High Hopes
1989 (2nd)	(Luxembourg) Sabine Berg	A Wopbopaloobop A Lopbamboom
1989 (2nd)	(Switzerland) Roger Jendly	The Woman from Rose Hill
1989 (2nd)	(Italy) Alessandro Di Sanzo	Forever Mery
1989 (2nd)	(Soviet Union) Ludmila Zaitseva	Little Vera
1990 (3rd)	no award given European Film Award for Best Supporting Actress; European Film Award for Best Supporting Actor	
1991 (4th)	no award given European Film Award for Best Supporting Actress; European Film Award for Best Supporting Actor	
1992 (5th)	no award given European Film Award for Best Supporting Actress; European Film Award for Best Supporting Actor	
after 1992	award discontinued	
