= European Film Award for Best Film =

Annual award

- Awarded for: Best European Film of the Year
- Presented by: European Film Academy
- First award: A Short Film About Killing (1988)
- Currently held by: Sentimental Value (2025)
- Website: europeanfilmacademy.org

European Film Award for Best Film is one of the annual European Film Awards, presented by the European Film Academy to recognize the best in European filmmaking. It was first awarded in 1988 with Polish film A Short Film About Killing, directed by Krzysztof Kieślowski, being the first recipient of the award.

Directors Gianni Amelio, Lars von Trier and Michael Haneke have received the most wins in this category with three wins each, while Pedro Almodóvar is the most nominated director with seven nominations, winning twice. Maren Ade was the first female director to win the award, receiving it for Toni Erdmann in 2016.

== Winners and nominees ==
=== 1980s ===
Year	English title	Original title	Director(s)	Production Country
1988 (1st)	A Short Film About Killing	Krótki film o zabijaniu	Krzysztof Kieślowski	Poland
1988 (1st)	Goodbye Children	Au revoir les enfants	Louis Malle	France, West Germany
1988 (1st)	The Animated Forest	El bosque animado	José Luis Cuerda	Spain
1988 (1st)	Distant Voices, Still Lives		Terence Davies	United Kingdom
1988 (1st)	Wings of Desire	Der Himmel über Berlin	Wim Wenders	West Germany, France
1988 (1st)	Jacob	Iacob	Mircea Daneliuc	Romania
1988 (1st)	Pelle the Conqueror	Pelle Erobreren / Pelle Erövraren	Bille August	Denmark, Sweden
1989 (2nd)	Landscape in the Mist	Topio stin omichli	Theodoros Angelopoulos	Greece, France, Italy
1989 (2nd)	The Midas Touch	Eldorádó	Géza Bereményi	Hungary
1989 (2nd)	Magnus		Þráinn Bertelsson	Iceland
1989 (2nd)	Recollections of the Yellow House	Recordações da Casa Amarela	João César Monteiro	Portugal
1989 (2nd)	High Hopes		Mike Leigh	United Kingdom
1989 (2nd)	Little Vera	Маленькая Вера	Vasili Pichul	Soviet Union

=== 1990s ===
Year	English title	Original title	Director(s)	Production Country
1990 (3rd)	Open Doors	Porte aperte	Gianni Amelio	Italy
1990 (3rd)	The Match Factory Girl	Tulitikkutehtaan tyttö	Aki Kaurismäki	Finland
1990 (3rd)	Cyrano de Bergerac	Cyrano de Bergerac	Jean-Paul Rappeneau	France
1990 (3rd)	Interrogation	Przesłuchanie	Ryszard Bugajski	Poland
1990 (3rd)	¡Ay, Carmela!		Carlos Saura	Spain
1990 (3rd)	The Guardian Angel	Skyddsängeln	Suzanne Osten	Sweden
1990 (3rd)	Mother	Мать	Gleb Panfilov	Soviet Union
1991 (4th)	Riff-Raff		Ken Loach	United Kingdom
1991 (4th)	The Voyager	Homo Faber	Volker Schlöndorff	Germany
1991 (4th)	The Little Gangster	Le petit criminel	Jacques Doillon	France
1991 (4th)	Toto the Hero	Toto le héros	Jaco Van Dormael	Belgium
1991 (4th)	Delicatessen		Marc Caro, Jean-Pierre Jeunet	France
1991 (4th)	Ultra	Ultrà	Ricky Tognazzi	Italy
1992 (5th)	The Stolen Children	Il ladro di bambini	Gianni Amelio	Italy
1992 (5th)	La Vie de Bohème		Aki Kaurismäki	France
1992 (5th)	The Lovers on the Bridge	Les Amants du Pont-Neuf	Leos Carax	France
1992 (5th)	North	Nord	Xavier Beauvois	France
1992 (5th)	Three Days	Trys dienos	Šarūnas Bartas	Lithuania
1992 (5th)	The Northerners	De Noorderlingen	Alex van Warmerdam	Netherlands
1993 (6th)	Close to Eden	Урга — территория любви	Nikita Mikhalkov	Russia
1993 (6th)	Benny's Video		Michael Haneke	Austria
1993 (6th)	A Heart in Winter	Un cœur en hiver	Claude Sautet	France
1993 (6th)	Man Bites Dog	C'est arrivé près de chez vous	Rémy Belvaux, André Bonzel, Benoît Poelvoorde	Belgium
1993 (6th)	Orlando		Sally Potter	United Kingdom
1993 (6th)	Antonio's Girlfriend	La petite amie d'Antonio	Manuel Poirier	France
1994 (7th)	Lamerica		Gianni Amelio	Italy
1994 (7th)	In the Name of the Father		Jim Sheridan	Ireland, United Kingdom
1994 (7th)	Three Colours: Blue, Three Colours: White, Three Colors: Red	Trois couleurs: Bleu, Trois couleurs: Blanc, Trois couleurs: Rouge	Krzysztof Kieślowski	France, Poland, Switzerland
1994 (7th)	Kosh ba kosh	Кош ба кош	Bakhtyar Khudojnazarov	Tajikistan, Russia, Germany, Switzerland, Japan
1994 (7th)	Son of the Shark	Le Fils du requin	Agnès Merlet	France
1994 (7th)	Woyzeck		János Szász	Hungary
1995 (8th)	Land and Freedom		Ken Loach	United Kingdom
1995 (8th)	Rendezvous in Paris	Les Rendez-vous de Paris	Éric Rohmer	France
1995 (8th)	Ulysses' Gaze	Το βλέμμα του Οδυσσέα	Theo Angelopoulos	Greece
1995 (8th)	Butterfly Kiss		Michael Winterbottom	United Kingdom
1995 (8th)	Deathmaker	Der Totmacher	Romuald Karmakar	Germany
1995 (8th)	La Haine		Mathieu Kassovitz	France
1996 (9th)	Breaking the Waves		Lars von Trier	Denmark
1996 (9th)	Kolya	Kolja	Jan Svěrák	Czech Republic
1996 (9th)	Secrets & Lies		Mike Leigh	United Kingdom
1996 (9th)	Lea		Ivan Fila	Germany
1996 (9th)	Some Mother's Son		Terry George	Ireland
1997 (10th)	The Full Monty		Peter Cattaneo	United Kingdom
1997 (10th)	Captain Conan	Capitaine Conan	Bertrand Tavernier	France
1997 (10th)	The Fifth Element	Le Cinquième Élément	Luc Besson	France
1997 (10th)	The Perfect Circle	Savršeni krug	Ademir Kenović	Bosnia and Herzegovina
1997 (10th)	The English Patient		Anthony Minghella	United States, United Kingdom
1997 (10th)	The Thief	Вор	Pavel Chukhrai	Russia
1998 (11th)	Life Is Beautiful	La vita è bella	Roberto Benigni	Italy
1998 (11th)	The Butcher Boy		Neil Jordan	Ireland
1998 (11th)	Live Flesh	Carne trémula	Pedro Almodóvar	Spain
1998 (11th)	The Celebration	Festen	Thomas Vinterberg	Denmark
1998 (11th)	The Dreamlife of Angels	La Vie rêvée des anges	Erick Zonca	France
1998 (11th)	Run Lola Run	Lola rennt	Tom Tykwer	Germany
1998 (11th)	My Name Is Joe		Ken Loach	United Kingdom
1999 (12th)	All About My Mother	Todo sobre mi madre	Pedro Almodóvar	Spain
1999 (12th)	Show Me Love	Fucking Åmål	Lukas Moodysson	Sweden
1999 (12th)	Mifune's Last Song	Mifunes sidste sang	Søren Kragh-Jacobsen	Denmark
1999 (12th)	Moloch	Молох	Alexander Sokurov	Russia
1999 (12th)	Notting Hill		Roger Michell	United Kingdom
1999 (12th)	Rosetta		Jean-Pierre and Luc Dardenne	Belgium
1999 (12th)	Sunshine		István Szabó	Canada, Hungary, Austria, Germany
1999 (12th)	The War Zone		Tim Roth	United Kingdom

=== 2000s ===
Year	English title	Original title	Director(s)	Production Country
2000 (13th)	Dancer in the Dark		Lars von Trier	Denmark
2000 (13th)	Billy Elliot		Stephen Daldry	United Kingdom
2000 (13th)	Chicken Run		Peter Lord, Nick Park	United Kingdom
2000 (13th)	Harry, He's Here to Help	Harry, un ami qui vous veut du bien	Dominik Moll	France
2000 (13th)	The Taste of Others	Le Goût des autres	Agnès Jaoui	France
2000 (13th)	Bread and Tulips	Pane e tulipani	Silvio Soldini	Italy
2000 (13th)	Faithless	Trolösa	Liv Ullmann	Sweden
2001 (14th)	Amélie	Le Fabuleux Destin d'Amélie Poulain	Jean-Pierre Jeunet	France
2001 (14th)	Bridget Jones's Diary		Sharon Maguire	United Kingdom
2001 (14th)	The Experiment	Das Experiment	Oliver Hirschbiegel	Germany
2001 (14th)	Intimacy		Patrice Chéreau	France, Italy
2001 (14th)	Italian for Beginners	Italiensk for begyndere	Lone Scherfig	Denmark
2001 (14th)	The Piano Teacher	La Pianiste	Michael Haneke	France, Austria
2001 (14th)	The Son's Room	La stanza del figlio	Nanni Moretti	Italy, France
2001 (14th)	The Others	Los otros	Alejandro Amenábar	Spain
2002 (15th)	Talk to Her	Hable con ella	Pedro Almodóvar	Spain
2002 (15th)	Bend It Like Beckham		Gurinder Chadha	United Kingdom
2002 (15th)	Bloody Sunday		Paul Greengrass	United Kingdom
2002 (15th)	8 Women	8 femmes	François Ozon	France
2002 (15th)	Lilya 4-ever		Lukas Moodysson	Sweden
2002 (15th)	The Man Without a Past	Mies vailla menneisyyttä	Aki Kaurismäki	Finland, Germany, France
2002 (15th)	The Magdalene Sisters		Peter Mullan	United Kingdom
2002 (15th)	The Pianist		Roman Polanski	Poland, France, Germany, United Kingdom
2003 (16th)	Good Bye, Lenin!		Wolfgang Becker	Germany
2003 (16th)	Dirty Pretty Things		Stephen Frears	United Kingdom
2003 (16th)	Dogville		Lars von Trier	Denmark, Netherlands, Sweden, France, United Kingdom, Germany
2003 (16th)	In This World		Michael Winterbottom	United Kingdom
2003 (16th)	My Life Without Me	Mi vida sin mí	Isabel Coixet	Spain
2003 (16th)	Swimming Pool		François Ozon	France, United Kingdom
2004 (17th)	Head-On	Gegen die Wand	Fatih Akın	Germany, Turkey
2004 (17th)	A Hole in My Heart	Ett hål i mitt hjärta	Lukas Moodysson	Sweden, Denmark
2004 (17th)	Bad Education	La mala educación	Pedro Almodóvar	Spain
2004 (17th)	The Chorus	Les choristes	Christophe Barratier	France, Switzerland
2004 (17th)	The Sea Inside	Mar adentro	Alejandro Amenábar	Spain, France, Italy
2004 (17th)	Vera Drake		Mike Leigh	United Kingdom, France
2005 (18th)	Hidden	Caché	Michael Haneke	France, Austria, Germany, Italy
2005 (18th)	Brothers	Brødre	Susanne Bier	Denmark, United Kingdom, Sweden, Norway
2005 (18th)	Don't Come Knocking		Wim Wenders	Germany
2005 (18th)	The Child	L'enfant	Luc and Jean-Pierre Dardenne	Belgium, France
2005 (18th)	My Summer of Love		Pawel Pawlikowski	United Kingdom
2005 (18th)	Sophie Scholl – The Final Days	Sophie Scholl – Die letzten Tage	Marc Rothemund	Germany
2006 (19th)	The Lives of Others	Das Leben der Anderen	Florian Henckel von Donnersmarck	Germany
2006 (19th)	Breakfast on Pluto		Neil Jordan	Ireland, United Kingdom
2006 (19th)	Grbavica: Esma's Secret	Grbavica	Jasmila Žbanić	Bosnia and Herzegovina, Austria, Germany, Croatia
2006 (19th)	The Road to Guantanamo		Michael Winterbottom, Mat Whitecross	United Kingdom
2006 (19th)	Volver		Pedro Almodóvar	Spain
2006 (19th)	The Wind That Shakes the Barley		Ken Loach	Ireland, United Kingdom, France, Germany, Italy, Spain
2007 (20th)	4 Months, 3 Weeks and 2 Days	4 luni, 3 săptămâni şi 2 zile	Cristian Mungiu	Romania
2007 (20th)	The Edge of Heaven	Auf der anderen Seite	Fatih Akin	Germany, Turkey
2007 (20th)	The Last King of Scotland		Kevin Macdonald	United Kingdom
2007 (20th)	La Vie En Rose	La Môme	Olivier Dahan	France, Czech Republic, United Kingdom
2007 (20th)	Persepolis		Marjane Satrapi, Vincent Paronnaud	France
2007 (20th)	The Queen		Stephen Frears	United Kingdom, France, Italy
2008 (21st)	Gomorrah	Gomorra	Matteo Garrone	Italy
2008 (21st)	Il Divo		Paolo Sorrentino	Italy
2008 (21st)	The Class	Entre les murs	Laurent Cantet	France
2008 (21st)	Happy-Go-Lucky		Mike Leigh	United Kingdom
2008 (21st)	The Orphanage	El orfanato	Juan Antonio Bayona	Spain
2008 (21st)	Waltz with Bashir	ואלס עם באשיר	Ari Folman	France, Germany
2009 (22nd)	The White Ribbon	Das weiße Band	Michael Haneke	Germany, Austria, France, Italy
2009 (22nd)	Fish Tank		Andrea Arnold	United Kingdom
2009 (22nd)	Let the Right One In	Låt den rätte komma in	Tomas Alfredson	Sweden
2009 (22nd)	A Prophet	Un prophète	Jacques Audiard	France
2009 (22nd)	The Reader		Stephen Daldry	United Kingdom, Germany
2009 (22nd)	Slumdog Millionaire		Danny Boyle	United Kingdom

=== 2010s ===
Year	English title	Original title	Director(s)	Production Country
2010 (23rd)	The Ghost Writer		Roman Polanski	France, Germany, United Kingdom
2010 (23rd)	Honey	Bal	Semih Kaplanoğlu	Turkey
2010 (23rd)	Of Gods and Men	Des hommes et des dieux	Xavier Beauvois	France
2010 (23rd)	Lebanon	לבנון	Samuel Maoz	Germany, France, United Kingdom
2010 (23rd)	The Secret in Their Eyes	El secreto de sus ojos	Juan José Campanella	Spain
2010 (23rd)	Soul Kitchen		Fatih Akın	Germany
2011 (24th)	Melancholia		Lars von Trier	Denmark, Sweden, France, Germany
2011 (24th)	The Artist		Michel Hazanavicius	France
2011 (24th)	The Kid with a Bike	Le Gamin au vélo	Jean-Pierre and Luc Dardenne	Belgium, France, Italy
2011 (24th)	In a Better World	Hævnen	Susanne Bier	Denmark
2011 (24th)	The King's Speech		Tom Hooper	United Kingdom
2011 (24th)	Le Havre		Aki Kaurismäki	Finland, France, Germany
2012 (25th)	Amour		Michael Haneke	France, Austria, Germany
2012 (25th)	Barbara		Christian Petzold	Germany
2012 (25th)	The Hunt	Jagten	Thomas Vinterberg	Denmark
2012 (25th)	The Intouchables	Intouchables	Éric Toledano, Olivier Nakache	France
2012 (25th)	Shame		Steve McQueen	United Kingdom
2012 (25th)	Caesar Must Die	Cesare deve morire	Paolo Taviani, Vittorio Taviani	Italy
2013 (26th)	The Great Beauty	La grande bellezza	Paolo Sorrentino	Italy, France
2013 (26th)	Blancanieves		Pablo Berger	Spain
2013 (26th)	The Broken Circle Breakdown	Alabama Monroe	Felix Van Groeningen	Belgium
2013 (26th)	The Best Offer	La Migliore Offerta	Giuseppe Tornatore	Italy
2013 (26th)	A Coffee in Berlin	Oh Boy!	Jan Ole Gerster	Germany
2013 (26th)	Blue Is the Warmest Colour	La Vie d'Adèle – Chapitres 1 & 2	Abdellatif Kechiche	France
2014 (27th)	Ida		Paweł Pawlikowski	Poland, Denmark
2014 (27th)	Force Majeure	Turist	Ruben Östlund	Sweden, Denmark, Norway, France
2014 (27th)	Leviathan	Левиафан	Andrey Zvyagintsev	Russia
2014 (27th)	Nymphomaniac – Director's Cut		Lars von Trier	Denmark, Belgium, France, Germany, United Kingdom
2014 (27th)	Winter Sleep	Kış Uykusu	Nuri Bilge Ceylan	Turkey
2015 (28th)	Youth	Youth – La giovinezza	Paolo Sorrentino	Italy, France, United Kingdom, Switzerland
2015 (28th)	The Lobster		Yorgos Lanthimos	Ireland, United Kingdom, Greece, France, Netherlands
2015 (28th)	Mustang		Deniz Gamze Ergüven	France, Turkey, Germany
2015 (28th)	A Pigeon Sat on a Branch Reflecting on Existence	En duva satt på en gren och funderade på tillvaron	Roy Andersson	Sweden, Norway, France, Germany
2015 (28th)	Rams	Hrútar	Grímur Hákonarson	Iceland, Denmark
2015 (28th)	Victoria		Sebastian Schipper	Germany
2016 (29th)	Toni Erdmann		Maren Ade	Germany, Austria
2016 (29th)	Elle		Paul Verhoeven	France, Germany
2016 (29th)	I, Daniel Blake		Ken Loach	United Kingdom, France
2016 (29th)	Julieta		Pedro Almodóvar	Spain
2016 (29th)	Room		Lenny Abrahamson	Ireland
2017 (30th)	The Square		Ruben Östlund	Sweden, France, Germany, Denmark
2017 (30th)	BPM (Beats per Minute)	120 battements par minute	Robin Campillo	France
2017 (30th)	Loveless	Нелюбовь	Andrey Zvyagintsev	Russia, Belgium, Germany, France
2017 (30th)	On Body and Soul	Testről és lélekről	Ildikó Enyedi	Hungary
2017 (30th)	The Other Side of Hope	Toivon tuolla puolen	Aki Kaurismäki	Finland, Germany
2018 (31st)	Cold War	Zimna wojna	Pawel Pawlikowski	Poland, France, United Kingdom
2018 (31st)	Border	Gräns	Ali Abbasi	Sweden, Denmark
2018 (31st)	Dogman		Matteo Garrone	Italy, France
2018 (31st)	Girl		Lukas Dhont	Belgium, Netherlands
2018 (31st)	Happy as Lazzaro	Lazzaro felice	Alice Rohrwacher	Italy, Germany, France, Switzerland
2019 (32nd)	The Favourite		Yorgos Lanthimos	United Kingdom, Ireland
2019 (32nd)	Les Misérables		Ladj Ly	France
2019 (32nd)	An Officer and a Spy	J'accuse	Roman Polanski	France, Italy
2019 (32nd)	Pain and Glory	Dolor y gloria	Pedro Almodóvar	Spain
2019 (32nd)	System Crasher	Systemsprenger	Nora Fingscheidt	Germany
2019 (32nd)	The Traitor	Il traditore	Marco Bellocchio	Italy, Germany, France

=== 2020s ===
Year	English title	Original title	Director(s)	Production Country
2020 (33rd)	Another Round	Druk	Thomas Vinterberg	Denmark
2020 (33rd)	Berlin Alexanderplatz		Burhan Qurbani	Germany, Netherlands
2020 (33rd)	Corpus Christi	Boże Ciało	Jan Komasa	Poland, France
2020 (33rd)	Martin Eden		Pietro Marcello	Italy, France
2020 (33rd)	The Painted Bird	Nabarvené ptáče	Václav Marhoul	Czech Republic, Slovakia, Ukraine
2020 (33rd)	Undine		Christian Petzold	Germany, France
2021 (34th)	Quo Vadis, Aida?		Jasmila Žbanić	Bosnia and Herzegovina, Austria, Netherlands, France, Poland, Norway, Germany, Romania, Turkey
2021 (34th)	Compartment No. 6	Hytti nro 6	Juho Kuosmanen	Finland, Estonia, Germany
2021 (34th)	The Father		Florian Zeller	United Kingdom, France
2021 (34th)	The Hand of God	È stata la mano di Dio	Paolo Sorrentino	Italy
2021 (34th)	Titane		Julia Ducournau	France, Belgium
2022 (35th)	Triangle of Sadness		Ruben Östlund	Sweden, Germany, France, United Kingdom
2022 (35th)	Alcarràs		Carla Simón	Spain, Italy
2022 (35th)	Close		Lukas Dhont	Belgium, France, Netherlands
2022 (35th)	Corsage		Marie Kreutzer	Austria, Luxembourg, Germany, France
2022 (35th)	Holy Spider	عنکبوت مقدس	Ali Abbasi	Denmark, Germany, Sweden, France
2023 (36th)	Anatomy of a Fall	Anatomie d'une chute	Justine Triet	France
2023 (36th)	Fallen Leaves	Kuolleet lehdet	Aki Kaurismäki	Finland, Germany
2023 (36th)	Green Border	Zielona granica	Agnieszka Holland	Belgium, Czech Republic, France, Poland
2023 (36th)	Io Capitano		Matteo Garrone	Belgium, Italy
2023 (36th)	The Zone of Interest		Jonathan Glazer	Poland, United Kingdom
2024 (37th)	Emilia Pérez		Jacques Audiard	France
2024 (37th)	The Room Next Door	La habitación de al lado	Pedro Almodóvar	Spain
2024 (37th)	The Seed of the Sacred Fig	دانه‌ی انجیر معابد	Mohammad Rasoulof	Germany, France
2024 (37th)	The Substance		Coralie Fargeat	United Kingdom, France
2024 (37th)	Vermiglio		Maura Delpero	Italy, France, Belgium
2025 (38th)	Sentimental Value	Affeksjonsverdi	Joachim Trier	Norway, France, Germany, Denmark, Sweden, United Kingdom
2025 (38th)	It Was Just an Accident	یک تصادف ساده	Jafar Panahi	France, Luxembourg
2025 (38th)	Sirāt		Óliver Laxe	Spain, France
2025 (38th)	Sound of Falling	In die Sonne schauen	Mascha Schilinski	Germany
2025 (38th)	The Voice of Hind Rajab	صوت هند رجب	Kaouther Ben Hania	France
2026 (39th)	Fatherland		Paweł Pawlikowski	Poland, Germany, Italy, France
2026 (39th)	Fjord		Cristian Mungiu	Romania, Norway, France, Denmark, Finland, Sweden
2026 (39th)	La bola negra		Javier Calvo and Javier Ambrossi	Spain, France
2026 (39th)	La Gradiva		Marine Atlan	France, Italy
2026 (39th)	Woman Unknown	Kvinde ukendt	May el-Toukhy	Denmark, Sweden, Latvia

== Record holders ==
Achievement	Holder	Years
Most wins (by country)	Italy (7)	1990, 1992, 1994, 1998, 2008, 2013, 2015
Most wins (by country) including co-productions	Germany (11)	2003, 2004, 2005, 2006, 2009, 2010, 2011, 2012, 2016, 2017, 2021
Most nominations (by country)	France (38)	1988, 1990, 1991, 1992, 1993, 1994, 1995, 1997, 1998, 2000, 2001, 2002, 2003, 2004, 2005, 2007, 2008, 2009, 2010, 2011, 2012, 2013, 2015, 2016, 2017, 2019
Most nominations (by country) including co-productions	France (63)	1988, 1990, 1991, 1992, 1993, 1994, 1995, 1997, 1998, 2000, 2001, 2002, 2003, 2004, 2005, 2007, 2008, 2009, 2010, 2011, 2012, 2013, 2015, 2016, 2017, 2018, 2019
Most wins for Best Film (by director)	Gianni Amelio (3); Lars von Trier (3); Michael Haneke (3)	1990, 1992, 1994; 1996, 2000, 2011; 2005, 2009, 2012
Most nominations for Best Film (by director)	Pedro Almodóvar (8)	1998, 1999, 2002, 2004, 2006, 2016, 2019, 2024
