= European Film Award for Best Supporting Actor =

European film award

The European Film Award for Best Supporting Actor was awarded by the European Film Academy to actors of European language films. It ran from 1988 to 1992.

== Winners and nominees ==
=== Awards by Years ===
Year	Winner and nominees	Film
1988 (1st)	(West Germany) Curt Bois	Wings of Desire
1988 (1st)	(Sweden) Björn Granath	Pelle the Conqueror
1988 (1st)	(Republic of Ireland) Ray McBride	Reefer and the Model
1988 (1st)	(Poland) Wojciech Pszoniak	Notturno
1988 (1st)	(Iceland) Helgi Skulason	Shadow of the Raven
1989 (2nd)	no award given, see European Film Award for Best Supporting Performance	
1990 (3rd)	(Soviet Union) Dmitri Pevtsov	Mother
1990 (3rd)	(Sweden) Björn Kjellman	The Guardian Angel
1990 (3rd)	(Spain) Gabino Diego	¡Ay Carmela!
1991 (4th)	(Italy) Ricky Memphis	Ultra
1991 (4th)	(Poland) Zbigniew Zamachowski	Escape from the 'Liberty' Cinema
1991 (4th)	(United Kingdom) Ricky Tomlinson	Riff-Raff
1992 (5th)	(France) André Wilms	La Vie de Bohème
1992 (5th)	(Estonia) Väino Laes	Peace Street
1992 (5th)	(Sweden) Ernst-Hugo Järegård	Europa
after 1992	award discontinued	

== See also ==
- BAFTA Award for Best Supporting Actor
- César Award for Best Supporting Actor
- David di Donatello for Best Supporting Actor
- Goya Award for Best Supporting Actor
- Polish Academy Award for Best Supporting Actor
