= European Film Award for Best Supporting Actress =

European film award

The European Film Award for Best Supporting Actress was awarded by the European Film Academy to actress of European language films.

== Winners and nominees ==
| Year | Winners and nominees | Film | Ref. |
| 1988 (1st) | (Netherlands) Johanna ter Steege | The Vanishing | |
| 1988 (1st) | (Denmark) Lene Brøndum | Hip Hip Hurrah! | |
| 1988 (1st) | (United Kingdom) Freda Dowie | Distant Voices, Still Lives | |
| 1988 (1st) | (East Germany) Karin Gregorek | Bear Ye One Another's Burden | |
| 1989 (2nd) | no award given see European Film Award for Best Supporting Performance | | |
| 1990 (3rd) | (Sweden) Malin Ek | The Guardian Angel | |
| 1990 (3rd) | (Sweden) Lena Nylen | The Guardian Angel | |
| 1990 (3rd) | (Sweden) Gunilla Röör | The Guardian Angel | |
| 1991 (4th) | (Socialist Federal Republic of Yugoslavia) (Serbia) Marta Keler | Virginia | |
| 1991 (4th) | (Belgium) Sandrine Blancke | Toto the Hero | |
| 1991 (4th) | (Germany) Barbara Sukowa | Voyager | |
| 1992 (5th) | (Denmark) Ghita Nørby | Freud Leaving Home | |
| 1992 (5th) | (France) Bulle Ogier | Nord | |
| 1992 (5th) | (France) Evelyne Didi | La Vie de Bohème | |
| after 1992 | award discontinued | | |

== See also ==
- BAFTA Award for Best Actress in a Supporting Role
- César Award for Best Supporting Actress
- David di Donatello for Best Supporting Actress
- Goya Award for Best Supporting Actress
- Polish Academy Award for Best Supporting Actress
