= European Film Award for Best Young Actor or Actress =

European Film Award for Young Actor or Actress
- Awarded for: Best Performance by an Actor or Actress
- Presented by: European Film Academy
- Website: europeanfilmacademy.org

The European Film Award for Best Young Actor or Actress was presented at the 1988 European Film Awards to honor an outstanding leading performance by a young actor or actress. The award has only been presented twice. In 1990, it was rebranded and awarded as the European Discovery of the Year.

Year	Winner and nominees	English title	Original title	Character	Ref.
1988	Best Young Actors and Actresses				
1988	(Denmark) Pelle Hvenegaard	Pelle the Conqueror	Pelle Erobreren	Pelle Karlsson	
1988	(Czechoslovakia) Ondřej Vetchý	House for Two	Dům pro dva	Dan	
1988	(West Germany) Michaela Widhalm	Notturno	Mit meinen heißen Tränen	Schuberts Halbschwester Josefa	
1988	(West Germany) Stefan Wood	Cripples Go Christmas	Das Mädchen mit den Feuerzeugen	Spasski	
1988	(West Germany) Enrico Böttcher	Cripples Go Christmas	Das Mädchen mit den Feuerzeugen	Ringo	
1988	(West Germany) Arnold Frühwald	Cripples Go Christmas	Das Mädchen mit den Feuerzeugen	Aga	
1988	(West Germany) Enrico Böttcher	Cripples Go Christmas	Das Mädchen mit den Feuerzeugen	Ringo	
1989 (2nd)	no award given				
1990	European Discovery of the Year				
1990	(Italy) Ennio Fantastichini	Open Doors	Porte aperte	Tommasco Scalia	
1990	after 1990	award discontinued			

== See also ==
- BAFTA Rising Star Award
- César Award for Best Female Revelation, César Award for Best Male Revelation
- Lumière Award for Best Female Revelation, Lumière Award for Best Male Revelation
- Magritte Award for Most Promising Actor, Magritte Award for Most Promising Actress
- Goya Award for Best New Actress, Goya Award for Best New Actor
- David di Donatello for Best New Actress, David di Donatello for Best New Actor
