= 1st European Film Awards =

1988 film award ceremony in West-Germany

- Date: 26 November 1988
- Site: Theater des Westens, West Berlin
- Hosted by: Desirée Nosbusch and Jan Niklas
- Organized by: European Film Academy
- Official website: www.europeanfilmawards.eu

Highlights
- Best Picture: A Short Film About Killing
- Best Actor: Max von Sydow; Pelle the Conqueror
- Best Actress: Carmen Maura; Women on the Verge of a Nervous Breakdown
- Most awards: Wings of Desire; Pelle the Conqueror; Women on the Verge of a Nervous Breakdown (2)
- Most nominations: Distant Voices, Still Lives (5)

The 1st Annual European Film Awards, presented by the European Film Academy, recognized excellence in European cinema. The ceremony took place on 26 November 1988 at the Theater des Westens in West Berlin and was hosted by Luxembourgish presenter Desirée Nosbusch and German actor Jan Niklas.

British film Distant Voices, Still Lives led the nominations with five but the films Wings of Desire, Pelle the Conqueror and Women on the Verge of a Nervous Breakdown got the most wins with two each. Krzysztof Kieślowski's A Short Film About Killing received the award for Best European Film.

The Lifetime Achievement Award was awarded to Swedish director Ingmar Bergman presented by German actress Nastasja Kinski and to Italian actor Marcello Mastroianni presented by Italian actress Giulietta Masina. English filmmaker Richard Attenborough received the Award of Merit, which was presented by Italian actress Gina Lollobrigida while two Special Awards were presented, one to Italian director Bernardo Bertolucci for The Last Emperor and one to Russian composer Yuri Khanon for the music of The Days of Eclipse.

== Winners and nominees ==
The winners are in a yellow background and in bold.

=== Best European Film ===
English title	Original title	Director(s)	Producer(s)	Country
**A Short Film About Killing**	**Krótki film o zabijaniu**	**Krzysztof Kieslowski**	**Ryszard Chutkowski**	(Polish People's Republic)
Goodbye Children	Au revoir les enfants	Louis Malle		(France)
The Animated Forest	El bosque animado	José Luis Cuerda	Eduardo Ducay	(Spain)
Distant Voices, Still Lives		Terence Davies	Jennifer Howarth	(United Kingdom)
Wings of Desire	Der Himmel über Berlin	Wim Wenders		(West Germany)
Pelle the Conqueror	Pelle erobreren	Bille August	Per Holst	(Denmark)

=== Best European Director ===
Recipient(s)	English title	Original title
**(West Germany) Wim Wenders**	**Wings of Desire**	**Der Himmel über Berlin**
(United Kingdom) Terence Davies	Distant Voices, Still Lives	
(France) Louis Malle	Goodbye Children	Au revoir les enfants
(Portugal) Manoel de Oliveira	The Cannibals	Os canibais
(Soviet Union) Sergei Parajanov	The Lovelorn Minstrel	Ashik Kerib / აშიკ-ქერიბი

=== Best European Actress ===
Recipient(s)	English title	Original title	Role
**(Spain) Carmen Maura**	**Women on the Verge of a Nervous Breakdown**	**Mujeres al borde de un ataque de nervios**	**Pepa**
(Iceland) Tinna Gunnlaugsdóttir	In the Shadow of the Raven	Í skugga hrafnsins	Isold
(Italy) Ornella Muti	Private Access	Codice privato	Anna
(Republic of Ireland) Carol Scanlan	Reefer and the Model		Teresa "the Model"

=== Best European Actor ===
Recipient(s)	English title	Original title	Role
**(Sweden) / (France) Max von Sydow**	**Pelle the Conqueror**	**Pelle erobreren**	**Lassefar "Lasse" Karlsson**
(Austria) / (Germany) Klaus Maria Brandauer	Hanussen		Klaus Schneider / Erik Jan Hanussen
(Spain) Alfredo Landa	El bosque animado		Malvís / Bandid Fendetestas
(Germany) Udo Samel	Mit meinen heißen Tränen		Franz Schubert
(Romania) Dorel Vișan	Iacob		Iacob

=== Best European Supporting Actress ===
Recipient(s)	English title	Original title	Role
**(Netherlands) Johanna ter Steege**	**The Vanishing**	**Spoorloos**	**Saskia Wagter**
(Denmark) Lene Brøndum	Hip Hip Hurrah!	Hip hip hurra! / Hipp hipp hurra!	Lille
(United Kingdom) Freda Dowie	Distant Voices, Still Lives		Mother / Nell Davies
(East Germany) Karin Gregorek	Bear Ye One Another's Burden	Einer trage des anderen Last	Oberschwester Walburga

=== Best European Supporting Actor ===
Recipient(s)	English title	Original title	Role
**(West Germany) Curt Bois**	**Wings of Desire**	**Der Himmel über Berlin**	**Homer**
(Sweden) Björn Granath	Pelle the Conqueror	Pelle erobreren	Erik
(Republic of Ireland) Ray McBride	Reefer and the Model		Badger
(Poland) Wojciech Pszoniak	Mit meinen heißen Tränen		Kajetan
(Iceland) Helgi Skúlason	Shadow of the Raven	Í skugga hrafnsins	Grim

=== Best European Young Actor or Actress ===
Recipient(s)	English title	Original title	Role
**(Denmark) Pelle Hvenegaard**	**Pelle the Conqueror**	**Pelle erobreren**	**Pelle Karlsson**
(Czechoslovakia) Ondřej Vetchý	House for Two	Dům pro dva	Dan
(West Germany) Michaela Widhalm	Mit meinen heißen Tränen		Schuberts Halbschwester Josefa
(West Germany) Stefan Wood	Cripples Go Christmas	Das Mädchen mit den Feuerzeugen	Spasski

=== Best European Script ===
Recipient(s)	English title	Original title
**(France) Louis Malle**	**Goodbye Children**	**Au revoir les enfants**
(Portugal) Manoel de Oliveira	The Cannibals	Os Canibais
(United Kingdom) Terence Davies	Distant Voices, Still Lives	
(Italy) Angelo Pasquini	It's Happening Tomorrow	Domani accadrà
(East Germany) Wolfgang Held	Bear Ye One Another's Burden	Einer trage des anderen Last

=== Best Young Film ===
English title	Original title	Director(s)	Producer(s)	Country
**Women on the Verge of a Nervous Breakdown**	**Mujeres al borde de un ataque de nervios**	**Pedro Almodóvar**	**Augustin Almodovár**	(Spain)
Damnation	Kárhozat	Béla Tarr	József Marx, Tamas Liszkay	(Hungary)
Days of Darkness	Дни затмения	Aleksandr Sokurov	-	(Soviet Union)
It's Happening Tomorrow	Domani accadrà	Daniele Luchetti	Angelo Barbagallo, Nanni Moretti	(Italy)
Pathfinder	Ofelaš / Veiviseren	Nils Gaup	John M. Jacobsen	(Norway)
Reefer and the Model		Joe Comerford	Lelia Doolan	(Republic of Ireland)
Stormy Monday		Mike Figgis	Nigel Stafford-Clark	(United Kingdom) , (United States)

=== Special Aspect Award ===
Recipient(s)	English title	Original title	Work
**Georgi Aleksi-Meskhishvili, Niko Sanukeli, Schota Gogolaschwili**	**The Lovelorn Minstrel**	**Ashik Kerib / აშიკ-ქერიბი**	**Production Design**
Henri Alekan	Wings of Desire	Der Himmel über Berlin	Cinematography
Mário Barroso	The Cannibals	Os Canibais	Cinematography
Terence Davies	Distant Voices, Still Lives		Original Score
Félix Murcia	Women on the Verge of a Nervous Breakdown	Mujeres al borde de un ataque de nervios	Production Design

=== Lifetime Achievement Award ===
- (Sweden) **Ingmar Bergman**
- (Italy) **Marcello Mastroianni**

=== Special Jury Award ===
- (Italy) **Bernardo Bertolucci** for **The Last Emperor** (**L'ultimo imperatore**)
- (Soviet Union) **Yuri Khanon** for The Days of Eclipse (Дни затмения) (Special Prize of the Jury for the music the film)

=== Award of Merit ===
- (United Kingdom) **Richard Attenborough**
