= Roger Jendly =

Swiss actor

- Born: 8 March 1938 (age 88); Fribourg, Switzerland
- Occupation: Actor
- Years active: 1972–present

Roger Jendly (born 8 March 1938) is a Swiss actor. He has appeared in 65 films and television shows since 1972. For his performance in Alain Tanner's The Woman from Rose Hill, he got a European Film Award nomination for Best Supporting Performance.

== Partial filmography ==
- Le retour d'Afrique (1973) – Marcel
- The Invitation (1973) – Le voleur
- Erica Minor (1974) – Pierre, le jeune ouvrier
- Die Auslieferung (1974) – Sergej Njetschajew
- L'escapade (1974) – Le chercheur
- The Middle of the World (1974) – Roger
- Fluchtgefahr (1974) – Der Welsche
- Pas si méchant que ça (1975)
- Jonah Who Will Be 25 in the Year 2000 (1976) – Marcel
- San Gottardo (1977) – Socialist revolutionary
- Thaw (1977) – Raymond
- Repérages (1977) – Jean Vallée
- Alzire oder der neue Kontinent (1978) – Rousseau
- Kleine frieren auch im Sommer (1978) – Roger
- Retour en force (1980)
- Un homme en fuite (1980) – Pierre Duschamps
- Sauve qui peut (la vie) (1980) – Customer of Isabelle's Sister
- Allons z'enfants (1981)
- The Homeless One (1981) – Vincent
- Espion, lève-toi (1982) – Le commissaire Lohmann
- La fuite en avant (1983) – Storm
- TransAtlantique (1983) – Roger Wiedmer
- The Death of Mario Ricci (1983) – Francis
- La trace (1983) – Le colporteur d'images pieuses
- Akropolis Now (1984) – Jean-Luc
- No Man's Land (1985) – L'autre douanier suisse
- La maison assassinée (1988) – Zorme
- Courir les rues (1988)
- Pestalozzi's Mountain (1989) – Kutscher
- Vent de galerne (1989) – Athanase
- The Woman from Rose Hill (1989) – Marcel
- My New Partner II (1990) – Albert Le Fourgue
- Maman (1990) – Norbert
- Anna Göldin, letzte Hexe (1991) – Jeanneret
- The Savage Woman (1991) – Maurice
- Un chien sur la route (1992) – Gregoire Zidar
- Les Agneaux (1996) – Le fromager
- Alors voilà, (1997) – Loulou
- La plage noire (2001) – Gilles
- C'est pas tout à fait la vie dont j'avais rêvé (2005) – Le mari
- Des filles en noir (2010) – Tony
- Noces (Stravinsky/Ramuz) (2012) – Le monsieur au chapeau
- Tinou (2016)
