= Jean-Philippe Écoffey =

Swiss actor

- Born: 8 July 1959 (age 66); Lausanne, Switzerland
- Occupation: Actor
- Years active: 1985–present

Jean-Philippe Écoffey (French pronunciation: [ʒɑ̃ filip ekɔfɛ]; born 8 July 1959) is a Swiss actor. He has appeared in more than sixty films since 1985.

== Selected filmography ==
| Year | Title | Role | Notes |
|---|---|---|---|
| 1985 | An Impudent Girl | | |
| 1985 | No Man's Land | | |
| 1988 | The Possessed | | |
| 1989 | The Woman from Rose Hill | | |
| 1996 | My Man | | |
| 1996 | The Apartment | | |
| 1997 | Ma vie en rose | | |
| 2003 | Snowboarder | | |
| 2003 | I, Cesar | | |
| 2016 | Moka | | |
| 2018 | Shock Waves – Diary of My Mind | | |
