= Golden Angel =

- Zlatý Anděl
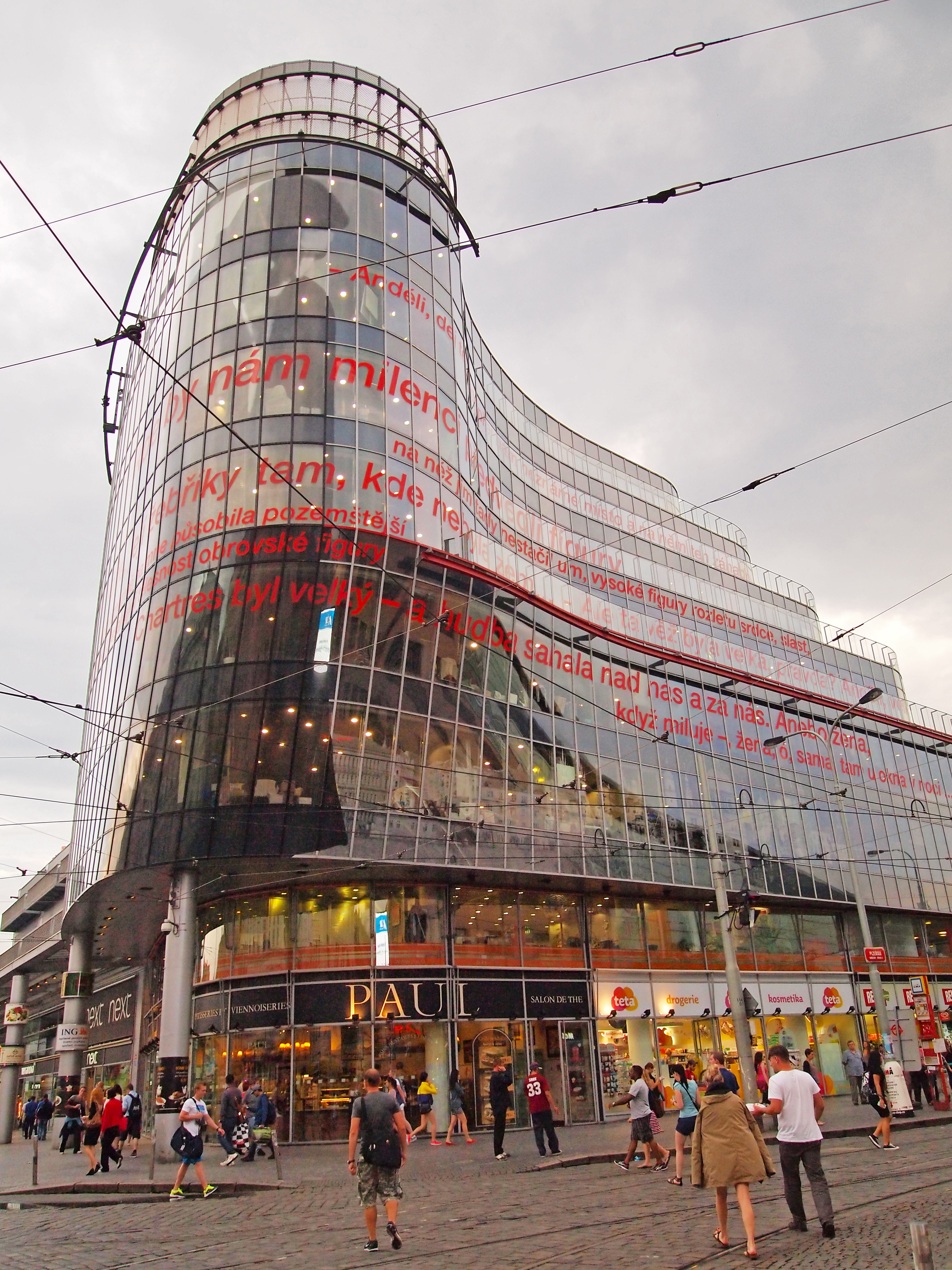
- Front view
- Interactive map of the Golden Angel area

General information
- Type: office complex
- Location: Anděl crossroad, Plzeňská 344/1, Praha 5 - Smíchov, Prague, Czech Republic
- Coordinates: 50°04′18.606″N 14°24′13.763″E
- Construction started: 1999
- Completed: 2000
- Cost: Kč1 billion
- Client: ING Real Estate
- Owner: ING Real Estate

Technical details
- Floor count: 7
- Floor area: 20,700 m^{2} (222,800 sq ft)
- Lifts/elevators: 2

Design and construction
- Architect: Jean Nouvel
- Architecture firm: Ateliér 8000

The Golden Angel (Czech: Zlatý Anděl) is an administrative complex situated in Prague. The designer by French architect Jean Nouvel.

The structure is located in the immediate vicinity of The Angel Crossroad (Křižovatka Anděl) which was named after The Golden Angel's Pharmacy (Lékárna U Zlatého Anděla). The pharmacy as well as its symbol - a gilded statue of an angel - was demolished in 1980 to make a room for new subway station.

== Origin ==
Nouvel started The Golden Angel project in 1994. The construction was launched five years later and the complex was completed in November 2000. The exclusive investor of the building is the ING Real Estate company.

== Exterior ==
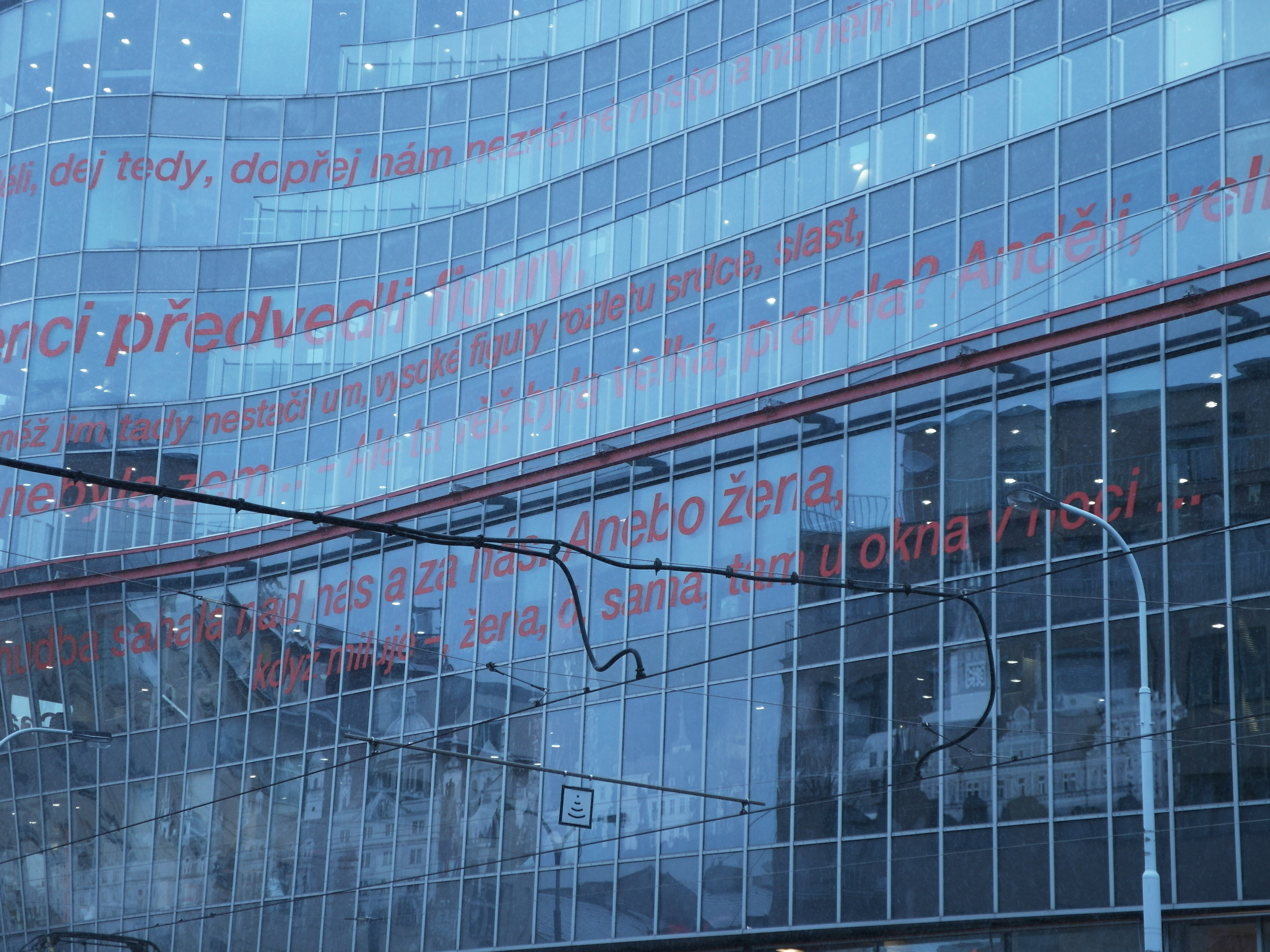
Detail

The Golden Angel is curve-shaped and edges are rounded. The technology of the layered facade allows it to vary the building's appearance during the daytime. The glassed facades bear passages from the writings of notable authors who had been creating in Prague: Jiří Orten, Konstantin Biebl, Franz Kafka, Guillaume Apollinaire, Rainer Maria Rilke and Gustav Meyrink.

A picture of an angel-protector, inspired by Wings of Desire, looks down upon the golden Angel crossroads, floating among clouds.

A unique technology was developed for portraying clouds and the Angel. The graphics are printed on an advert foil and cut into millimetre-sized dots, which are stuck onto the facade in a density of 80,000/m^{2}. The number of dots on the complex is reaching 150 millions; the printing and cutting process ran uninterrupted for over 7 months.
