= The Woman from Rose Hill =

1989 film

- Directed by: Alain Tanner
- Written by: Alain Tanner
- Starring: Marie Gaydu; Jean-Philippe Écoffey
- Cinematography: Hugues Ryffel
- Edited by: Laurent Uhler
- Music by: Michel Wintsch
- Release date: 1989
- Language: French

The Woman from Rose Hill (French: La femme de Rose Hill) is a 1989 French-Swiss romantic drama film written and directed by Alain Tanner. It was entered into the main competition at the 46th edition of the Venice Film Festival. For his performance, Roger Jendly got a European Film Award nomination for Best Supporting Performance.

== Plot ==
Julie is a young woman from Rose Hill (Mauritius) who arrives in rural Switzerland to marry her older pen-friend Marcel. She feels unhappy until she meets Jean, a younger man. However, his father disagrees.

== Cast ==
- Marie Gaydu as Julie
- Jean-Philippe Écoffey as Jean
- Denise Péron as Jeanne
- Roger Jendly as Marcel
- Louba Guertchikoff as Marcel's mother
- André Steiger as Jean's father
