= Ma vie en rose =

- Release poster
- Directed by: Alain Berliner
- Written by: Alain Berliner; Chris Vander Stappen
- Produced by: Carole Scotta
- Starring: Michèle Laroque; Jean-Philippe Écoffey; Hélène Vincent; Georges Du Fresne; Daniel Hanssens; Laurence Bibot; Jean-François Gallotte; Caroliné Baehr; Julien Rivière; Marie Bunel
- Cinematography: Yves Cape
- Edited by: Sandrine Deegen
- Music by: Dominique Dalcan; Zazie
- Production companies: Canal+ Eurimages; CNC; TF1 Films Production
- Distributed by: Haut et Court (France); Blue Light Distribution (United Kingdom)
- Release dates: 28 May 1997 (France); 24 October 1997 (United Kingdom)
- Running time: 89 minutes
- Countries: France; Belgium; United Kingdom
- Language: French
- Budget: $3.2 million
- Box office: $7.1 million

Ma vie en rose (English: My Life in Pink) is a 1997 Franco-Belgian drama film directed by Alain Berliner. It tells the story of Ludovic, a transgender girl, and depicts her family and community struggling to accept her gender identity.

The film received largely positive reviews and was selected as the Belgian entry for the Best Foreign Language Film at the 70th Academy Awards, but was not accepted as a nominee.

== Plot ==
Pierre and Hanna Fabre move into their dream house with wonderful neighbors and an idyllic community. Their youngest child, Ludovic, identifies as a girl and wants to live as one, despite being assigned male at birth.

One day, Ludovic befriends Jérôme, the son of Pierre's boss whose family lives across from the Fabres, and expresses a desire to marry him. When visiting Jérôme's house, Ludovic enters Jérôme's sister's bedroom and puts on one of her dresses, unaware that his parents were preserving the room after her death. Jérôme's mother finds Ludovic, and she and the rest of the neighbors are horrified.

The community turns against Ludovic and, by extension, the rest of the Fabre family. After Ludovic stands in as Snow White in a school play, the rest of the parents collectively sign a petition to have Ludovic expelled. Pierre, under strain as an employee of Jérôme's father, is unable to cope and causes conflict within the family. Ludovic is assaulted by the boys on the soccer team in the locker room after a match. Her brother Jean tries to stop it, but is held back.

Following a particularly bad argument, Ludovic attempts suicide by hiding in a freezer, but is found in time and allowed to wear a skirt to a neighborhood party. While the other neighbors greet Ludo warmly, Pierre is fired the next day and finds his house graffitied. Ludovic flees, distraught. Hanna blames Ludovic for all that has gone wrong. In order to set her child straight, she cuts Ludovic's hair short. Resentful of her mother, Ludovic goes to live with grandmother Élisabeth. When Ludovic and Élisabeth visit Pierre and Hanna one weekend, Pierre announces that he has a new job, but it is out of town and they have to move.

At their new house, Ludovic is befriended by Chris (born Christine) Delvigne, a masculine child. Chris' mother invites Ludovic to Chris' dress-up birthday party, which Ludo attends in a musketeer outfit. Chris, unhappy in a princess outfit, asks Ludo to swap and has the other young party guests force Ludo to do so upon refusal. When Ludovic's mother sees them, she fears that their troubles are beginning again and lashes out by hitting Ludo until the other party guests restrain her.

Hanna follows Ludovic to a billboard where she is shocked to see Ludo in the picture, running away with Pam, the Barbie-like protagonist. When she tries to follow her, she falls through the ground and awakens at home. She and Pierre assure Ludo that they will no longer try to control her gender expression. In turn, Ludo assures her mother that she never really intended to run away with Pam. Hanna, happy to see her, accepts Ludo's identity and says Ludo will always be her child.

== Cast ==
- Georges Du Fresne as Ludovic "Ludo" Fabre
- Michèle Laroque as Hanna Fabre
- Jean-Philippe Écoffey as Pierre Fabre
- Hélène Vincent as Élisabeth
- Daniel Hanssens as Albert
- Laurence Bibot as Lisette
- Jean-François Gallotte as Jeannot
- Julien Rivière as Jérôme
- Gregory Diallo as Thom Fabre
- Erik Cazals De Fabel as Jean Fabre
- Cristine Barget as Zoé Fabre
- Delphine Cadet as Pam
- Raphaelle Santini as Christine "Chris" Delvigne
- Marine Jolivet as Fabienne Delvigne
- Anne Coesens as Teacher
- Vincent Grass as Principal

== Production ==
Although internationally presented as a Belgian film because of the nationality of Berliner, its director and co-screenwriter, the film is an international co-production between companies in Belgium, the United Kingdom and France – the majority of the production work was done by the French independent film house Haut et Court and the shooting took place south of Paris, France, near the commune of Évry.

The color timing in the film is significant: it changes as parents exit from the school play, switching to cold blue tones.

== Release ==
In the United States, the film received an R rating by the Motion Picture Association of America, an unusual decision due to the film's minimal sexual content, minimal violence and mild language. This decision was accused of being motivated by transphobia.

== Reception ==
My Life in Pink received critical acclaim. On review aggregator website Rotten Tomatoes, it has a 92% approval score based on 25 reviews, with an average rating of 7.50/10. The consensus states: "My Life in Pink follows a child's exploration of their gender identity with warmth and empathy -- for its young protagonist as well as the family affected by their journey." The film has also received praise for centering the experience of a transgender child, instead of more dominant narratives like "an objectifying medical discourse that ignores the possibility of agency". Juliet Jacques, writing for the British Film Institute, attributed the film's emotional resonance to "Berliner's grasp of the simplicity of gender markers for children, and their importance", pointing to "the scene where Ludo's hair is forcibly cut" as an example.

=== Accolades ===
The film won the Golden Globe Award for Best Foreign Language Film. It also won the Crystal Globe award at the Karlovy Vary International Film Festival.

== See also ==
- Tomboy (2011)
- Growing Up Coy (2016)
- Childhood gender nonconformity
- Transgender
- Transgender in film and television
- Cross-dressing in film and television
- "La Vie en rose"
- List of submissions to the 70th Academy Awards for Best Foreign Language Film
- List of Belgian submissions for the Academy Award for Best Foreign Language Film
