= The Apartment (1996 film) =

- Directed by: Gilles Mimouni
- Written by: Gilles Mimouni
- Produced by: Georges Benayoun
- Starring: Romane Bohringer; Vincent Cassel; Jean-Philippe Écoffey; Monica Bellucci
- Cinematography: Thierry Arbogast
- Edited by: Caroline Biggerstaff; Françoise Bonnot
- Music by: Peter Chase
- Distributed by: Cinemien
- Release date: 2 October 1996
- Running time: 116 minutes
- Country: France
- Language: French
- Budget: $4.7 million
- Box office: $1.1 million

The Apartment (French: L'Appartement) is a 1996 French drama film written and directed by Gilles Mimouni (in his directorial debut), and starring Romane Bohringer, Vincent Cassel, Jean-Philippe Écoffey and Monica Bellucci.

== Plot ==
Max (Vincent Cassel) is a former bohemian and an amateur writer who gets a job in New York and leaves his girlfriend Lisa (Monica Bellucci), with whom he was madly in love, in mysterious circumstances. After two years, he returns home to Paris, and decides to settle down and gets engaged to Muriel (Sandrine Kiberlain). By chance, he catches a glimpse of his lost love, Lisa, in a café, but fails to make contact with her before she storms out. Determined to meet her, Max secretly cancels his business trip abroad to pursue his lost love. Through a series of ruses and perseverance, he enters Lisa's apartment. Hearing that somebody else has arrived, he hides in her wardrobe.

First, he thinks it is Lisa, as the girl who came to the apartment resembles Lisa from behind. After several misunderstandings, they finally get acquainted. The girl introduces herself as Lisa. The same night, they have sex, and their relationship starts to develop. The girl's real name is Alice (Romane Bohringer). During the film, flashbacks are intertwined with the narrative to provide a background for Max, Lisa, and especially for Alice, shedding light on the situation.

The flashbacks show that Alice and Lisa were best friends, living in apartments on the same floor of two facing buildings, and that Alice became obsessed with Max, Lisa's then-boyfriend, from a distance. She restyled herself to look like Lisa while secretly engineering a breakup between them. Lisa is a stage actress and leaves abruptly for a two-month tour, giving Alice a letter to deliver to Max asking him to wait for her; Alice never sends the letter. Max, believing Lisa left because she didn't love him, accepts a job in New York and leaves. Upon her return, Lisa is heartbroken that Max has left her and leaves on a cruise (a gift from Alice) to ease her mind, where she meets a rich, married older man named Daniel.

Lisa is being pursued by Daniel, who might have murdered his wife to get closer to her. For this reason, she avoids her flat and lets Alice use it. To complicate matters further, Alice is dating Max's best friend, Lucien, who is also Max's confidante.

In a sub-plot, Alice is seen to be acting in Shakespeare's Midsummer Night's Dream, drawing comparisons between the four lovers in the film and those in the play; it is arguable that the whole film is a rendition of the play.

The film begins and ends in "reality" where Max and Muriel lead a futile, vacuous but bourgeois life in high finance (and the implication being that Muriel is the boss's daughter, thus imitating Egeus' involvement in Hermia's marriage to Demetrius in Midsummer Night's Dream), but almost all the action takes place in a dreamlike trance where the lovers don't really know whom they love. Lucien is always faithful to Alice, and pursues her, but both Alice and Lisa (who, as their names imply, are reflections of each other) initially both love Max, and Max, although madly in love with Lisa, turns to Alice after reading her diary, just before reality dawns and he accepts his fate with Muriel. Lisa returns to her apartment and is confronted by Daniel, who drops a lighter on the floor (covered in gasoline) causing the apartment to explode and blowing Lucien through the window of a café across the street. Alice leaves her life behind and flies to Rome, bidding Max one last farewell glance as he embraces Muriel at the airport.

== Cast ==
- Vincent Cassel as Max
- Romane Bohringer as Alice
- Monica Bellucci as Lisa
- Jean-Philippe Écoffey as Lucien
- Sandrine Kiberlain as Muriel
- Olivier Granier as Daniel
- Édouard Baer as Theater Actor

== Reception ==
In his review for BBC, Almar Haflidason rated the film 5 out of 5 stars, describing it as "a gorgeously wicked film that tests visceral foreplay to a near unbearable but satisfying climax."

In 1998, the film won a BAFTA Award for Best Film Not in the English Language and the first British Independent Film Award for the Best Film in a Foreign Language.

The film was also a modest hit in France with 55,565 admissions its opening weekend and 152,714 admissions total. Although the film was never released theatrically in the United States, it was released on DVD on August 22, 2006. The film was remade in the United States as Wicker Park in 2004.
