= Jonah Who Will Be 25 in the Year 2000 =

- Directed by: Alain Tanner
- Written by: John Berger; Alain Tanner
- Starring: Roger Jendly; Myriam Boyer; Jean-Luc Bideau; Miou-Miou
- Cinematography: Renato Berta
- Edited by: Brigitte Sousselier
- Music by: Jean-Marie Sénia
- Production company: Citel Films
- Release date: 1976
- Running time: 110 minutes
- Countries: Switzerland; France
- Language: French

Jonah Who Will Be 25 in the Year 2000 (French: Jonas qui aura 25 ans en l'an 2000) is a 1976 Swiss-French drama film directed by Alain Tanner and written by Tanner and John Berger. Starring Roger Jendly, Myriam Boyer, Jean-Luc Bideau and Miou-Miou, it premiered in 1976 and received the Ernest Artaria Prize and the International Critics Award at the 1976 Locarno Film Festival.

== Synopsis ==
The film follows eight characters who, after failing to change the world, turn instead to changing their own lives.

== Cast ==
The cast includes:

- Jean-Luc Bideau as Max
- Myriam Mézières as Madeleine
- Rufus as Mathieu
- Myriam Boyer as Mathilde
- Roger Jendly as Marcel
- Miou-Miou as Marie
- Jacques Denis as Marco
- Dominique Labourier as Marguerite
- Raymond Bussières as the old Charles

== Reception ==
=== Awards and nominations ===
At the 1976 Locarno Film Festival, the film received the Ernest Artaria Prize and the International Critics Award, while Renato Berta also received an Ernest Artaria Prize for his work on the film.

=== Critical response ===
The film was favourably reviewed by Pauline Kael in The New Yorker: "The whole film is designed as a collection of little routines. Jonah is so ingeniously constructed that one can enjoy it the way one enjoyed Renoir's egalitarian films of the thirties, relating to each character in turn." In a retrospective review, Variety described the film as a “lively rumination on time and history”. The Washington Post called the film “a politically and socially conscious movie that keeps a humorous, affectionate glow on”.

Filmdienst described the film as a poetic fable whose appeal lies in the viewer’s active intellectual engagement. Filmpodium cited Dave Kehr, who described the film as funny, moving and instructive, and as a political film that speaks to both the heart and the mind. On Rotten Tomatoes, the film has an approval rating of 85% based on 13 reviews.

== Festival screenings ==
In later years, it was screened at festivals including Solothurner Filmtage in 1996, the Sitges Film Festival in 2000, the 41st Mostra Internacional de Cinema de São Paulo in 2017, Festival Lumière in 2021, the 77th Locarno Film Festival in 2024, and the 26th Buenos Aires Festival Internacional de Cine Independiente in 2025.

== See also ==
- List of submissions to the 49th Academy Awards for Best Foreign Language Film
- List of Swiss submissions for the Academy Award for Best Foreign Language Film
