= Gilles Mimouni =

French architect and film director (born 1956)

- Born: 1956 (age 68–69)
- Occupations: Architect; film director

Gilles Mimouni (French: [mimuni]; born 1956) is a French architect and film director. He is mainly known for the feature film L'Appartement (1996) - a tense romantic thriller starring Vincent Cassel, Monica Bellucci, and Romane Bohringer, and he acted as executive producer for its U.S remake Wicker Park (2004).
