= Wings of Desire =

1987 film by Wim Wenders

- Theatrical release poster
- Directed by: Wim Wenders
- Written by: Wim Wenders; Peter Handke; Richard Reitinger (collaboration)
- Produced by: Wim Wenders; Anatole Dauman
- Starring: Bruno Ganz; Solveig Dommartin; Otto Sander; Curt Bois; Peter Falk
- Cinematography: Henri Alekan
- Edited by: Peter Przygodda
- Music by: Jürgen Knieper
- Production companies: Road Movies Filmproduktion Argos Films Westdeutscher Rundfunk
- Distributed by: Basis-Film-Verleih GmbH (West Germany); Argos Films (France)
- Release dates: 17 May 1987 (Cannes); 29 October 1987 (West Germany)
- Running time: 127 minutes
- Countries: West Germany; France
- Languages: German; English; French; Turkish; Hebrew; Spanish
- Budget: 5 million DM
- Box office: USD$3.2 million

Wings of Desire (German: Der Himmel über Berlin, pronounced [deːɐ̯ ˈhɪml̩ ˈʔyːbɐ bɛɐ̯ˈliːn]; lit. 'The Heaven/Sky over Berlin') is a 1987 romantic fantasy film written by Wim Wenders, Peter Handke and Richard Reitinger, and directed by Wenders. The film is about invisible, immortal angels who populate Berlin and listen to the thoughts of its human inhabitants, comforting the distressed. Even though the city is densely populated, many of the people are isolated or estranged from their loved ones. One of the angels, played by Bruno Ganz, falls in love with a beautiful, lonely trapeze artist, played by Solveig Dommartin. The angel chooses to become mortal so that he can experience human sensory pleasures, ranging from enjoying food to touching a loved one, and so that he can discover human love with the trapeze artist.

Inspired by art depicting angels visible around West Berlin, at the time encircled by the Berlin Wall, Wenders and author Peter Handke conceived of the story and continued to develop the screenplay throughout the French and German co-production. The film was shot by Henri Alekan in both colour and black-and-white, the latter being used to represent the world as seen by the angels. The cast includes Otto Sander, Curt Bois and Peter Falk.

For Wings of Desire, Wenders won awards for Best Director at both the Cannes Film Festival and European Film Awards. The film was a critical and financial success, and academics have interpreted it as a statement of the importance of cinema, libraries, the circus, or German unity, containing New Age, religious, secular or other themes.

It was followed by a sequel, Faraway, So Close!, released in 1993. City of Angels, a U.S. remake, was released in 1998. In 1990, numerous critics named Wings of Desire as one of the best films of the 1980s.

== Plot ==
In a Berlin divided by the Berlin Wall, two angels, Damiel and Cassiel, watch the city, unseen and unheard by its human inhabitants. They observe and listen to the thoughts of Berliners, including a pregnant woman in an ambulance on the way to the hospital, a young prostitute standing by a busy road, and a broken man who feels betrayed by his wife. Their raison d'être is, as Cassiel says, to "assemble, testify, preserve" reality. Damiel and Cassiel have always existed as angels; they were in Berlin before it was a city, and before there were any humans.

Among the Berliners they encounter in their wanderings is an old man named Homer, who dreams of an "epic of peace". Cassiel follows the old man as he looks for the then-demolished Potsdamer Platz in an open field, and finds only the graffiti-covered Wall. Although Damiel and Cassiel are pure observers, visible only to children, and incapable of any interaction with the physical world, Damiel begins to fall in love with a profoundly lonely circus trapeze artist named Marion. She lives by herself in a caravan in West Berlin, until she receives the news that her group, the Circus Alekan, will be closing down. Depressed, she dances alone to a concert by Crime & the City Solution, and drifts through the city.

Meanwhile, actor Peter Falk arrives in West Berlin to make a film about the city's Nazi past. Falk was once an angel, but, having grown tired of always observing and never experiencing, renounced his immortality to become a participant in the world. Also growing weary of infinity, Damiel longs for the genuineness and limits of human existence. He meets Marion in a dream, and is surprised when Falk senses his presence and tells him about the pleasures of human life.

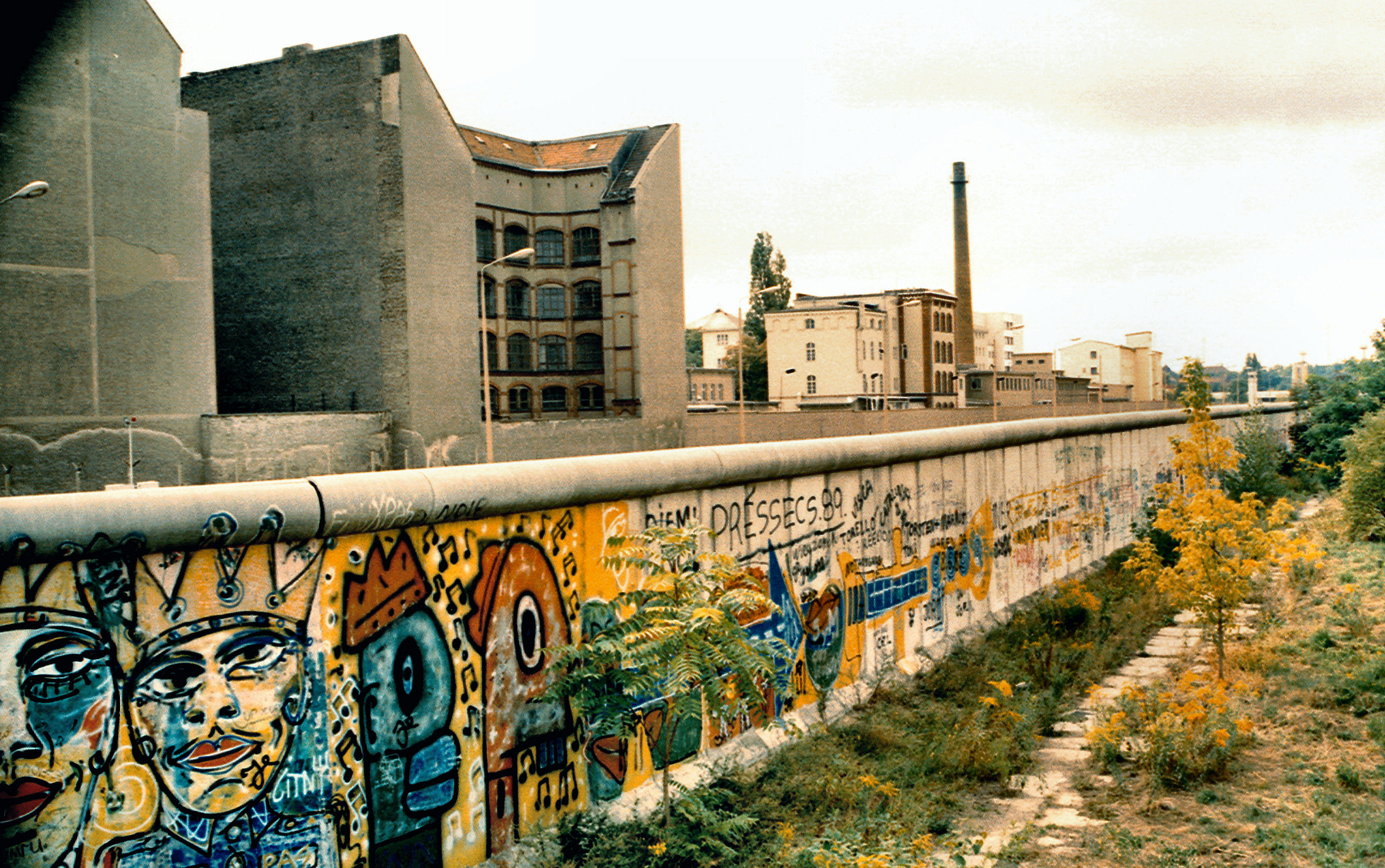
The graffiti on the Berlin Wall is depicted in the film.

Damiel is finally persuaded to shed his immortality. He experiences life for the first time: he bleeds, sees colours, tastes food and drinks coffee. Meanwhile, Cassiel taps into the mind of a young man just about to take his own life by jumping off a building. Cassiel tries to save the young man but is unable to do so, and is left tormented by the experience. Sensing Cassiel's presence, Falk reaches out to him as he had to Damiel, but Cassiel is unwilling to follow their example. Eventually, Damiel meets the trapeze artist Marion at a bar during a concert by Nick Cave, and she greets him and speaks about finally finding a love that is serious and can make her feel complete. The next day, Damiel considers how his time with Marion taught him to feel amazed, and how he has gained knowledge no angel is capable of achieving.

== Cast ==
- Bruno Ganz as Damiel
- Solveig Dommartin as Marion
- Otto Sander as Cassiel
- Curt Bois as Homer
- Peter Falk as himself
- Hans-Martin Stier as Der Sterbende (the dying man) (as Hans Martin Stier)
- Elmar Wilms as Ein trauriger Mann (a sad man)
- Sigurd Rachman as Der Selbstmörder (the suicide)
- Beatrice Manowski as Das Strichmädchen (the young prostitute)
- Lajos Kovács as Im Zirkus - Marion's Trainer (in the circus, Marion's trainer)
- Bruno Rosaz as Im Zirkus - Der Clown (in the circus, the clown)
- Laurent Petitgand as Im Zirkus - Der Kapellmeister (in the circus, the bandleader)
- Chick Ortega as Im Zirkus - Der Schlagzeuger (in the circus, the drummer) (as Chico Rojo Ortega)
- Otto Kuhnle as Im Zirkus - Die Jongleure (in the circus, the juggler)
- Christoph Merg as Im Zirkus - Der Jongleure (in the circus, the juggler)
- Peter Werner as Im Zirkus - Der Manager (in the circus, the manager)
- Jerry Ross Barrish as Im Bunker - Der Regisseur (in the bunker, the director)

== Production ==
=== Development ===
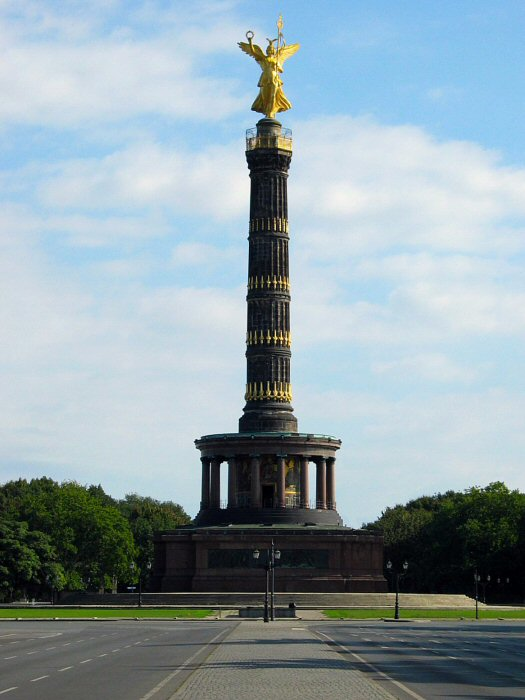
Berlin art depicting angels served as an inspiration to the filmmakers.

After living and working in the United States for eight years, director Wim Wenders returned to his native West Germany and wished to reconnect to it with a film about his favourite part of it, West Berlin. Planning to make Until the End of the World in 1985, he realised the project would not be ready for two years, and wishing to return to photography as soon as possible, he considered another project.

Rainer Maria Rilke's poetry partially inspired the story. Wenders claimed angels seemed to dwell in Rilke's poetry, and the director had also jotted "angels" in his notes one day, and noted angel-themed artwork in cemeteries and around Berlin. In his treatment, Wenders also considered a backstory in which God exiled his angels to Berlin as punishment for defending humans after 1945, when God had decided to forsake them.

Wenders employed Peter Handke, who wrote much of the dialogue, the poetic narrations, and the film's recurring poem "Song of Childhood". Wenders found the names Damiel and Cassiel in an encyclopedia about angels, and also had photographs of Solveig Dommartin, Bruno Ganz and Otto Sander that served as muses. The idea that angels could read minds led to Wenders considering personal dialogue no one would say aloud. Wenders did not view the angel protagonist as representative of himself, instead deciding the angel could be an embodiment of film, and that the purpose of film could be to help people by opening their eyes to possibilities. Handke did not feel able to write a single coherent story, but promised to regularly send notes on ideas during production. Screenwriter Richard Reitinger also assisted Wenders in scripting scenes incorporating Handke's contributions.

Given the nature of this arrangement, Wenders would hold daily meetings with his crew, frequently at late hours, to plan the logistics for the following day. French producer Anatole Dauman did not see a large budget as necessary, and the project was funded with 5 million DM.

=== Casting ===
Actor	Role
Bruno Ganz	Damiel
Solveig Dommartin	Marion
Otto Sander	Cassiel
Curt Bois	Homer, the aged poet
Peter Falk	himself (credited as "Der Filmstar")
Nick Cave and the Bad Seeds	themselves
Crime & the City Solution	themselves

Wenders believed it would be important for the actors playing the two main angel characters to be familiar and friendly with each other. Ganz and Sander had performed in some of the same stage productions for 20 years. Sander and Ganz also recommended Curt Bois to Wenders and asked Bois to perform. Bois' performance as Homer marked his final feature film in an 80-year career, beginning as a child actor.

Peter Falk's role was not planned until photography had already begun, with Wenders planning an artist or political official to have an analogous role until assistant Claire Denis suggested the Columbo star would be familiar to everyone. Falk described the part as "the craziest thing that I've ever been offered", but quickly agreed. He was accustomed to the improvisation the newly created role required, and when Wenders and Falk met, they conceived ideas of the character sketching and searching for a hat. Nick Cave and his band were based in West Berlin, with Wenders calling him "a real Berlin hero" and deciding "It was inconceivable for me to make a film in Berlin without showing one of his concerts".

=== Filming ===
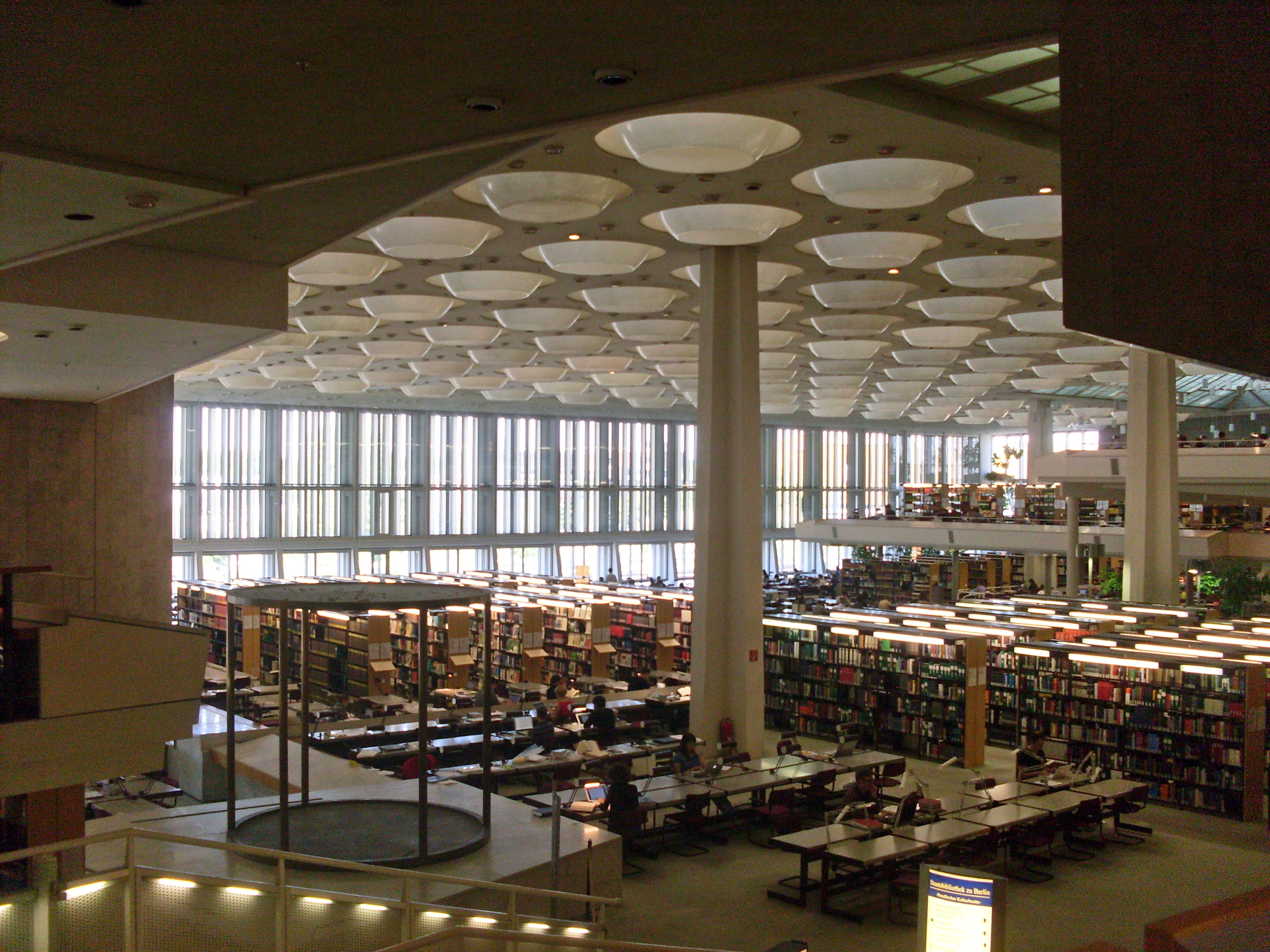
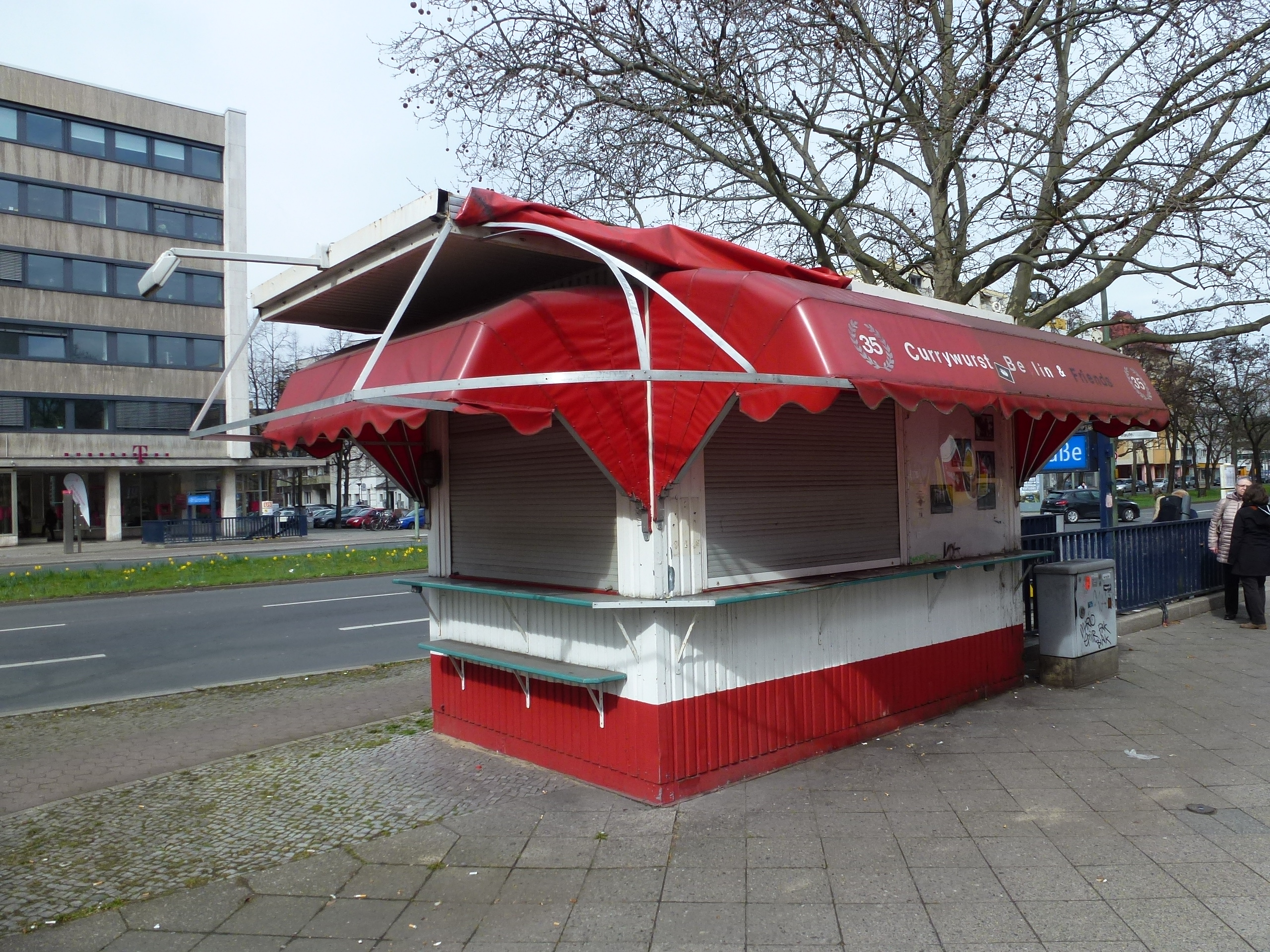
Berlin State Library and other spots around West Berlin were filming locations.

The film was shot by Henri Alekan, whose cinematography represents the angels' point of view in monochrome, as they cannot see colours, and switches to colour to show the human point of view. During filming, Alekan used a very old and fragile silk stocking that had belonged to his grandmother as a filter for the monochromatic sequences, in order to depict the angels' muted view of the world. Wenders felt it was natural that angels without experience of the physical world would not see colour, and also thought black-and-white cinematography by Alekan would provide a novel view of Berlin.

A challenge in the cinematography was posed by using the camera for the perception of angels, as angels are not restrained in how far they can observe, in any dimension. The story's Circus Alekan is named in the cinematographer's honour.

Filming took place at actual locations in West Berlin, such as the Siegessäule, Hans Scharoun's Berlin State Library, Potsdamerplatz with the disused elevated track of the M-Bahn, the Lohmühlenbrücke, the Langenscheidtbrücke (the motorcycle accident), Oranienstrasse, Goebenstrasse 6 (where Damiel exchanges his breastplate for a loud check jacket), Waldemarstrasse (where Damiel comes to as a human), Günzelstrasse U-Bahn station, the Anhalter Bahnhof, Theodor-Wolff-Park (site of the circus), Hochbunker Pallasstrasse (Peter Falk's film set) and the Hotel Esplanade (the concert). Most shots of the Wall are genuine, although the set for the scene in the death strip, in which Damiel announces his decision to become human, was specially built. Some pieces of the recreation were made from inexpensive wood, with one being destroyed by rain during production.

With little idea of how to portray the angels and no costume design, Wenders said the filmmakers consulted artwork, experimented, and found the idea of armour during production, and told U.S. filmmaker Brad Silberling they did not decide on overcoats until later. The hairstyle was loosely inspired by a photograph of a Japanese warrior.

Although the circus scenes required extensive and risky acrobatics, Dommartin was able to learn the trapeze and rope moves in a mere eight weeks, and did all the work herself, without a stunt double. During production, the filmmakers called German police after Falk went missing. Falk had been spending hours exploring West Berlin and was discovered in a café.

=== Post-production ===
Peter Handke arrived in West Berlin during the editing process, led by Peter Przygodda. Handke believed it bordered on a silent film, aside from some music, and lacked much of the notes he had sent to Wenders during filming. Handke thus proposed adding his writings via voice-over. After Falk left Berlin, he recorded much of his voice-over in a sound studio in Los Angeles. Much of this was improvised, though Wenders still supervised by telephone.

With the filming performed in lengthy takes, and the camera used as "the eye of the angel", much of the movement was conveyed in the camerawork rather than in editing effects. There was five hours of footage to edit down to the final cut. A pie fight between the stars was filmed for the final scene, but later edited out.

Composer Jürgen Knieper assumed harps and violins would suffice for a score for a film about angels, until he saw a cut of the film. Seeing the angels were discontented, he wrote a different score employing a choir, voices and whistling. Laurent Petitgand contributed the circus music, an ensemble work performed with accordions, saxophones and keyboards.

== Themes and interpretations ==
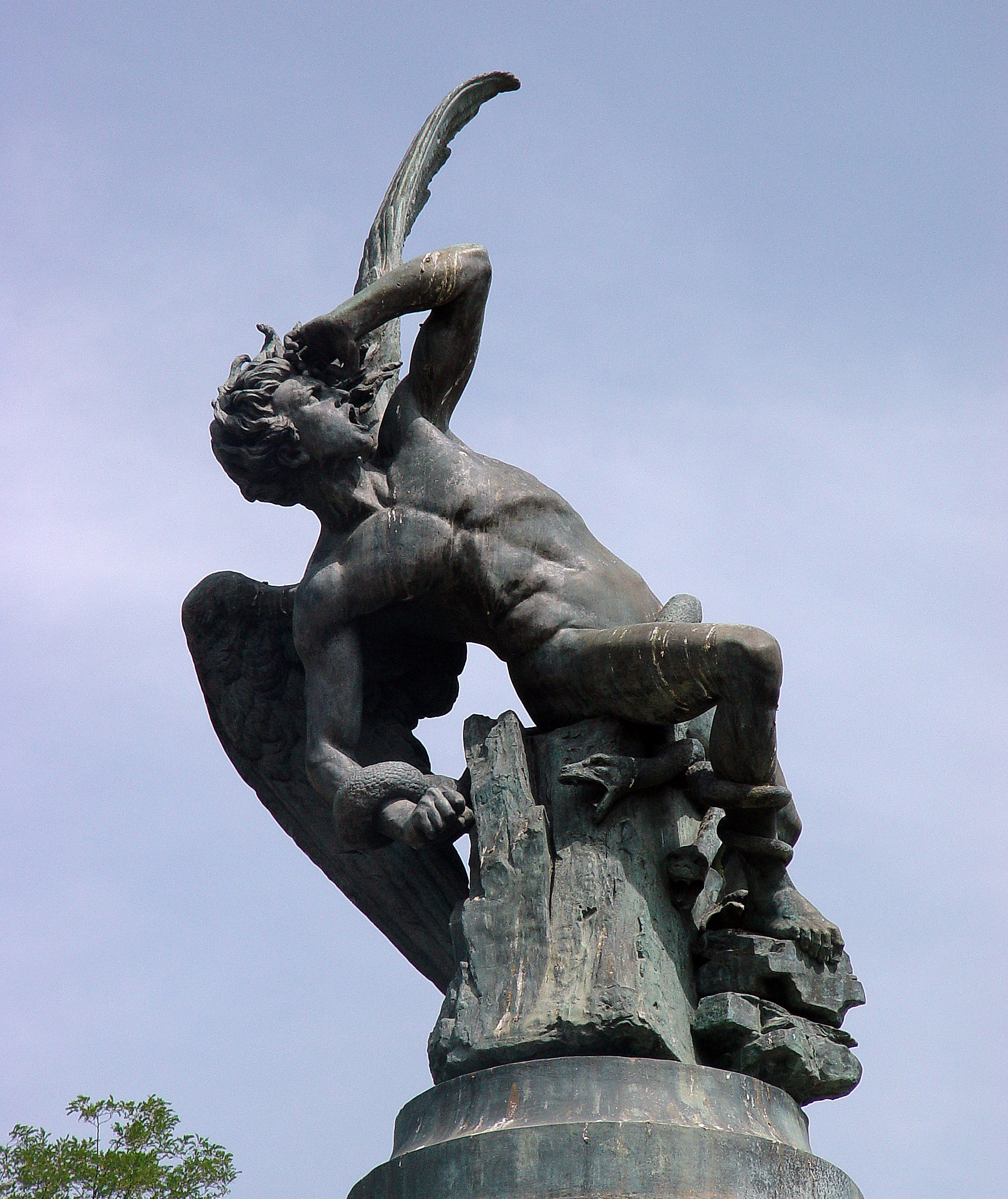
The story contains similarities to the fallen angel concept, though unrelated to evil.

The concept of angels, spirits or ghosts who help humans on Earth had been common in cinema, from Here Comes Mr. Jordan (1941) to the 1946 works It's a Wonderful Life and A Matter of Life and Death. Many earlier U.S. and U.K. films demonstrate high amounts of reverence, while others allow reasonable amounts of fun. Powell and Pressburger's A Matter of Life and Death presents an early example of spirits being jealous of the lives of humans. The shift from monochrome to colour, to distinguish the angels' reality from that of the mortals, was also used in Powell and Pressburger's film. While Wings of Desire does not portray Berliners as living in a utopia, academic Roger Cook wrote that the fact that people have pleasure "gives, as the English title suggests, wings to desire".

God is not mentioned in the film, and is only referred to in the sequel Faraway, So Close! when the angels state a purpose to connect humans with "Him". Scholars Robert Phillip Kolker and Peter Beickene attributed the apparent lack of God to New Age beliefs, remarking Damiel's "fall" is similar to the story of Lucifer, though not related to evil. Reviewer Jeffrey Overstreet concurred that "Wenders had left his church upbringing behind", and the cinematic angels are "inventions he could craft to his specifications", with little regard for biblical beliefs. Overstreet characterized them as "whimsical metaphors, characters who have lost the joy of sensual human experience". Nevertheless, Professor Craig Detweiler believed the sky-level view of Berlin and the idea of guardian angels evoke God. Authors Martin Brady and Joanne Leal added that even if Damiel is tempted by seemingly profane things, the atmosphere of Berlin means the human Damiel is still in "a place of poetry, myth and religion".

In one scene, Damiel and Cassiel meet to share stories in their observations, with their function revealed to be one of preserving the past. Professor Alexander Graf wrote this connects them to cinema, with Wenders noting Wings of Desire itself depicts or shows places in Berlin that have since been destroyed or altered, including a bridge, Potsdamer Platz and the Wall.

The closing titles state: "Dedicated to all the former angels, but especially to Yasujiro, François and Andrej" (all references to Wenders' fellow filmmakers Yasujirō Ozu, François Truffaut, and Andrei Tarkovsky). These directors had all died before the release of the film, with Kolker and Beickene arguing they were an influence on Wenders: Ozu had taught Wenders order; Truffaut the observation of people, especially youth; and Tarkovsky, a less clear influence on Wenders, consideration of morality and beauty. Identifying directors as angels could tie in with the film characters' function to record.

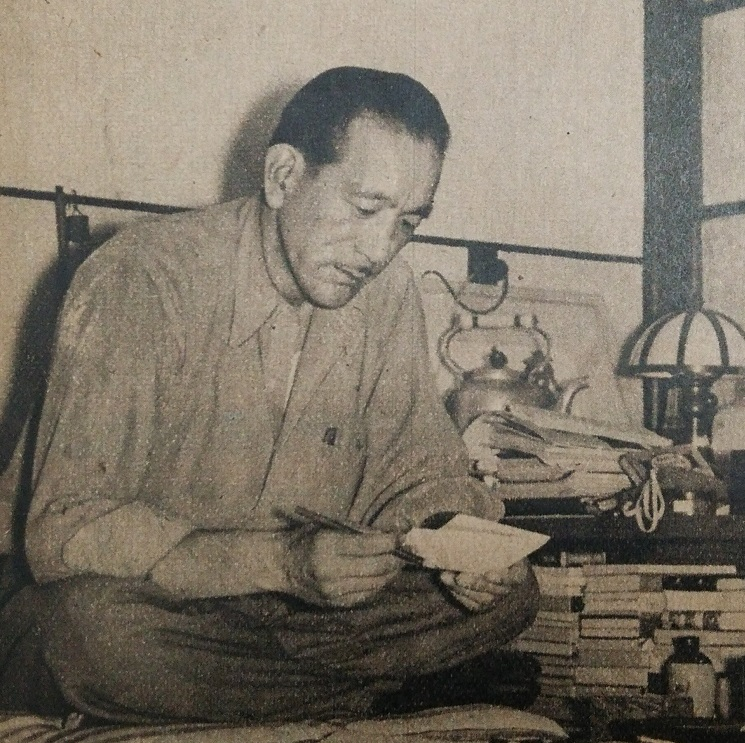
Yasujirō Ozu, one of the film dedication's "angels"

Academic Laura Marcus believed a connection between cinema and print is also established in the angels' affinity for libraries, as Wenders portrays the library as a tool of "memory, and public space", making it a miraculous place. The depiction of Damiel, by using a pen or an immaterial pen, to write "Song of Childhood", is also tribute to print and literacy, introducing, or as Marcus hypothesized, "perhaps even releasing, the visual images that follow". Kolker and Beickene interpreted the use of poetry as part of screenwriter Peter Handke's efforts to elevate language above common rhetoric to the spiritual. Reviewing the poetry, Detweiler remarked that Handke's "Song of Childhood" bears parallels to St. Paul's 1 Corinthians 13 ("When I was a child, I spoke as a child, I understood as a child, I thought as a child ... "). Professor Terrie Waddell added that the poem established "centrality of childhood" as a key theme, noting that the children can see angels and accept them without question, tying them in with the phenomenon of imaginary friends.

The film has also been read as a call for German reunification, which followed in 1990. Essayists David Caldwell and Paul Rea saw it as presenting a series of two opposites: East and West, angel and human, male and female. Wenders' angels are not bound by the Wall, reflecting East and West Berlin's shared space, though East Berlin remains primarily black and white. Scholar Martin Jesinghausen believed the film presumed reunification would never happen, and contemplated its statements on divides, including territorial and "higher" divides, "physicality and spirituality, art and reality, black and white and colour".

Researcher Helen Stoddart, in discussing the depiction of the circus and trapeze artist Marion in particular, submitted that Marion is the classic circus character, creating an image of danger and then potential. Stoddart argued that Homer and Marion may find the future in what remains of history found in Berlin. Stoddart considered the circular nature of the story, including a parallel between the angel who cannot see the physical (Damiel), and the faux angel (Marion) who can "see the faces". Marion also observes that all directions lead to the Wall, and the final French dialogue "We have embarked" while the screen states "To be continued", suggests "final movement to a new beginning".

Writing in the journal Film and Philosophy, Nathan Wolfson cites Roland Barthes's work—especially S/Z—as a model to argue that "This 'angelic' portion of Wings of Desire deliberately invokes in the viewer a set of specific responses. These responses provide the foundation for the transformation that Damiel and Marion participate in. The film prepares the viewer for an analogous transformation, and invites the viewer to participate in this process, through an exploration of authorship and agency."

== Style ==
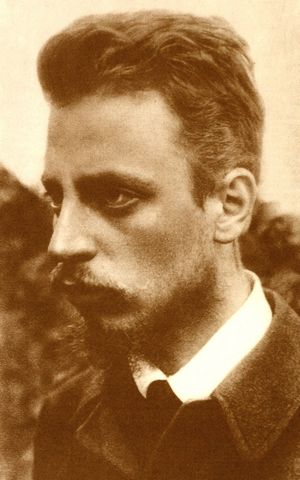
Rainer Maria Rilke's poetry influenced the concept and style.

British Film Institute writer Leigh Singer assessed the cinematic style as "bold" and artistic in its use of colour, "existential voiceover" and "languorous pacing". Singer also commented on the use of symbolism and the combinations of diverse pieces of culture, from the poetry of Rainer Maria Rilke to the music of Nick Cave. In Singer's estimation, the cinematography is able to communicate the angels' "invisible intimacy and empathy". Professor Terrie Waddell described the "dialogue and monologue" as "lyrical", in the mould of Rilke's poetry. Scholar Alexander Graf considered how these voice-overs and verbal exchanges are frequently combined with background radio and television sounds, and concluded the "image and soundtrack" that comprise the style convey a point of "blindness": "men and women are plagued by their everyday problems; children are, like the angels, in their own dreamy world".

Professor Russell J.A. Kilbourn judged the style as opposed to realism and "emphatically German" in looking at particular situations of human life. Authors Martin Brady and Joanne Leal remarked that the storytelling shies away from an entirely narrative format, and the film's writing style is embodied in the Homer character as "the angel of story-telling". Perception of people becomes key to the storytelling, with Brady and Leal quoting Handke's vision for a new narrative: "You have only interpreted and changed the world; what matters is to describe it". Psychologist Ryan Niemiec wrote that, by focusing on "the beauty of each moment", Wings of Desire conveys "awe and wonder".

As Singer observed, Wings of Desire serves as a "Symphony of a city" in capturing a "wintry, pre-unification Berlin". Kilbourn said that the place highlighted in the German title Der Himmel über Berlin, like the desire referenced in the English title, is of great importance, and that the "frequent angel's-eye-view shots of East and West Berlin" allows for "quasi-objective voyeuristic surveillance". Observing the angels' trench-coat fashion, sociologist Andrew Greeley wrote it fitted the "wet, blustery, cold northern Germany" setting. Looking at the coats and ponytails, Dr. Detweiler found the visualization of the angels "so cool and stylish".

Music is used in differing ways throughout the story. Musicologist Annette Davison argued that Knieper's score in angel scenes is artistic, with elements of Eastern European and Orthodox Christian music, and Petitgand's music displays a "slippery" harmony frequently heard in circus entertainment. When Marion leaves the Circus Alekan, there is an increase in rock music, particularly by Cave and Crime & the City Solution. Davison submitted this symbolizes "utopian promise of the sensual mortal world", and that the lyrics echo the plot: Cave's "The Carny" suggests a disappearing carnival worker as the Circus Alekan closes, and "From Her to Eternity" suggests a desire for a woman's love. Professor Adrian Danks wrote that Cave's rock music symbolized "the physical, worldly reality of Berlin", with "The Carny" adding a feel of sorrow in the background, while Marion gives "breathy accompaniment".

== Release ==
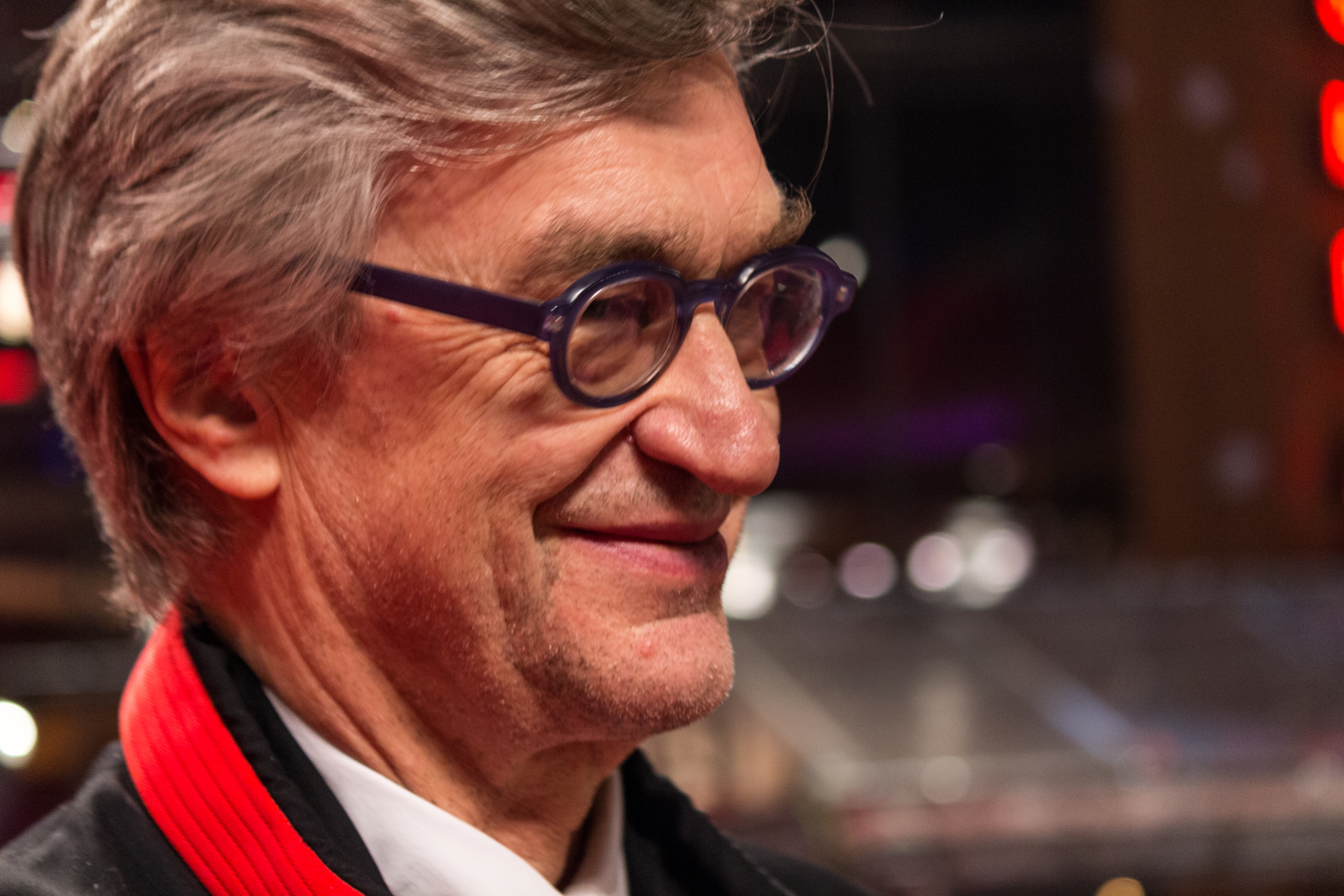
Wim Wenders attended the 2015 Berlin International Film Festival.

The film debuted at the Cannes Film Festival on 17 May 1987. Der Himmel über Berlin subsequently opened in West Germany late in October 1987. With Orion Classics as its U.S. distributor, it opened in New York City as Wings of Desire on 29 April 1988 with a PG-13 rating. Sander said that it had a release in Japan, and that while angels do not appear in Japanese mythology, Tokyo audiences would approach him after and share their impressions about the characters.

After a videotape printing in Germany in 1988, Kinowelt released a DVD in Germany and Region 2 in 2005. In 2009, The Criterion Collection released the film in Region 1 on DVD and Blu-ray. It later screened at the 65th Berlin International Film Festival in February 2015, to mark Wenders' Honorary Golden Bear.

The Wim Wenders Foundation produced a digital 4K restoration using the original black-and-white and colour film stock. This new version of the film premiered on 16 February 2018 during the 68th Berlin International Film Festival at Kino International, as part of the "Berlinale Classics" programme.

== Reception ==
=== Box office ===
Der Himmel über Berlin had 922,718 admissions in Germany. Under the title Les Ailes du désir, it had a further 1,079,432 admissions in France.

The film finished its run in North America on 11 May 1989, having grossed $3.2 million, or possibly nearly $4 million, a positive investment for Orion. Critic James Monaco assessed the financial performance as above that of typical art films. In 2000, Variety calculated that it was 48th in the top 50 highest-grossing foreign language films ever released in the U.S., and one of only three in German, along with Das Boot and Run Lola Run.

=== Critical reception ===
Wings of Desire received widespread critical acclaim. On the review aggregator website Rotten Tomatoes, it holds an approval rating of 95% based on 65 reviews, with an average rating of 8.7/10. The website's critics consensus reads, “Beyond ravishing, Wings of Desire is Wim Wenders' aching and heartbreaking exploration of how love makes us human.” Metacritic, which uses a weighted average, assigned the film a score of 79 out of 100, based on 9 critics, indicating "generally favorable" reviews. The film received "Two Thumbs Up" from Gene Siskel and Roger Ebert on Siskel & Ebert & The Movies, where Siskel credited Wenders for a story that "praises life as it is lived yet making sense of life's confusions". In New York, David Denby hailed it as "extraordinary", and possibly "the ultimate German movie". Desson Howe cited it for "a soaring vision that appeals to the senses and the spirit." Janet Maslin, writing for The New York Times, called it "enchanting" in its concept, but "damagingly overloaded" in execution. In Variety, David Stratton embraced the visuals, the performances and Knieper's score, adding the film also showcased Wenders' taste for rock music. The Washington Post's Rita Kempley credited Wenders and Handke for crafting a "whimsical realm of myth and philosophical pretense, dense with imagery and sweetened by Ganz's performance". Dissenting, Pauline Kael remarked, "It's enough to make moviegoers feel impotent".

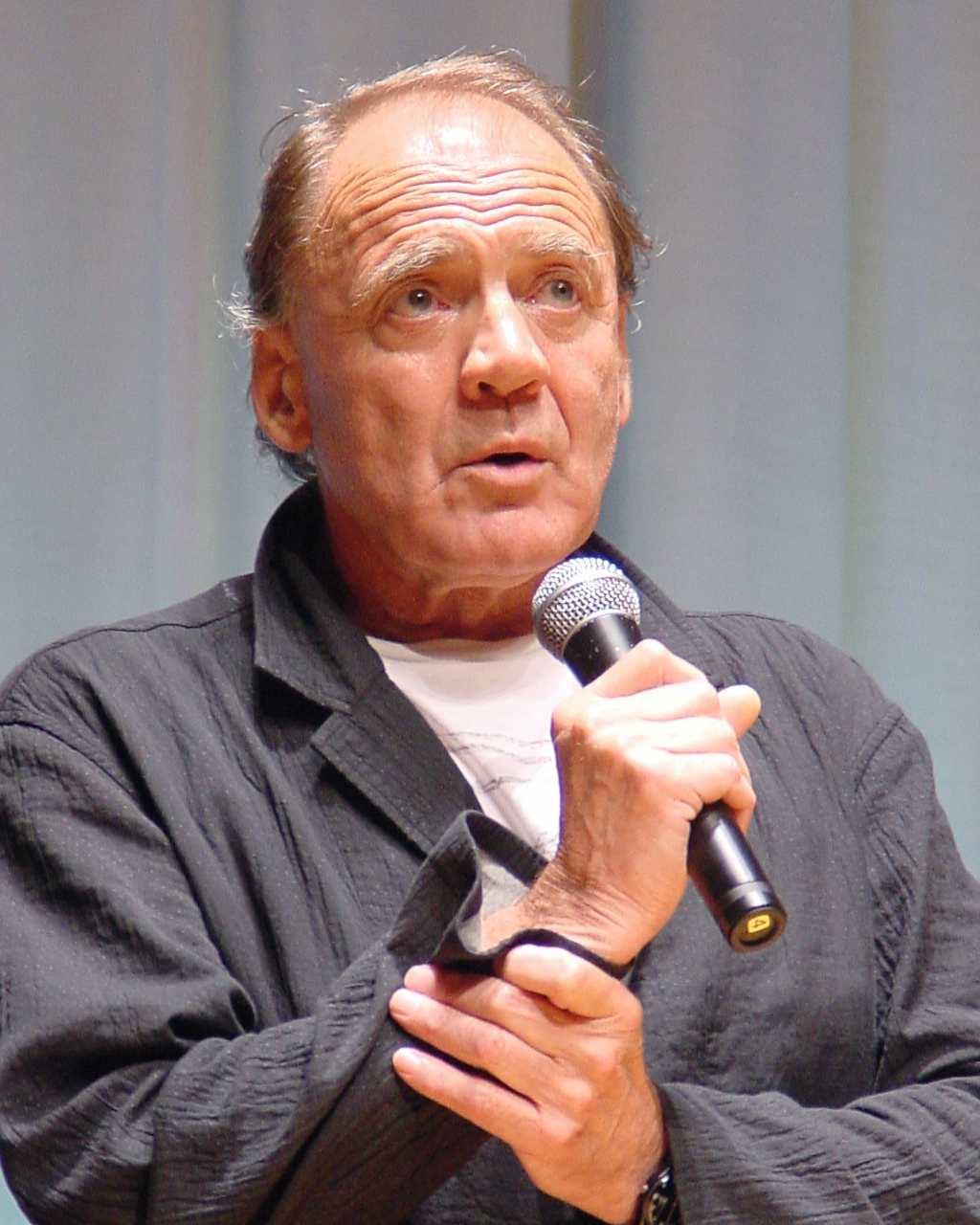
Bruno Ganz received positive reviews for his performance as Damiel; it was possibly his most remembered role before 2004.

By 1990, Wings of Desire was placed in the top 10 best films of the 1980s by critics David Denby (first), the Los Angeles Times's Sheila Benson (fourth), The Orange County Register's Jim Emerson (fifth) and Richard Schickel and Richard Corliss (tenth). Premiere voted it the second greatest film of the 1980s, after Raging Bull. James Monaco awarded it four and a half stars in his 1992 Movie Guide, praising it as "A rich, mystical near-masterpiece". In 1998, Ebert added it to his Great Movies list, championing it for "a mood of reverie, elegy and meditation". Empire critic Ian Nathan gave it five stars in his 2006 review, hailing it for its poetry, themes of loneliness, and Ganz's acting style. In 2004, The New York Times included the film on its list of "the Best 1,000 Movies Ever Made". On reflecting on Solveig Dommartin's death in 2007, Der Spiegel recalled the film as a poetic masterpiece. Reviewing the Criterion DVD in 2009, Time Out critic Joshua Rothkopf called it an introduction to the art film, but also a product of its time, mentioning the songs.

John Simon of the National Review, known for his negative reviews, had a differing opinion. He described Wings of Desire as both "obnoxious" and as a "130 minute mess".

It was later ranked 64th in Empire magazine's "The 100 Best Films Of World Cinema" in 2010. In 2011, The Guardian placed it in the 10 best films ever set in Berlin. The next year, it received 10 votes in the 2012 Sight & Sound polls of the greatest films ever made. Les Inrockuptibles's 2014 review declared it a great film, timeless, and poetic. That year, French critics at aVoir-aLire also praised its poetry, and said Berlin becomes one of the characters, crediting Alekan, Handke, Cave and Knieper for important contributions. German journalist Michael Sontheimer recommended seeing it to understand how radically Berlin has been altered since the 1980s, particularly looking at the somber images when the human Damiel walks through Berlin. In his 2009 Movie Guide, Leonard Maltin awarded it three and a half stars, describing it as "Haunting" and "lyrical". Jonathan Rosenbaum declared the bulk of the film before Damiel becomes human as "one of Wenders's most stunning achievements". In 2017, Le Monde rated it four stars out of five, citing the aesthetics of its black-and-white photography, poetry and contemplation of history. The German news publication Der Tagesspiegel recounted the film's memorable imagery in 2016, listing Damiel as an angel and the library scenes. On the 30th anniversary of the Cannes screening, Jessica Ritchey posted on Rogerebert.com that she found it odd to be an atheist and love the film, expressing admiration for the black-and-white photography and the overall message that when the world seems terrible, desire is powerful. On review aggregator website Rotten Tomatoes, the film has an approval rating of 95% based on 64 reviews from critics, with an average rating of 8.7/10. The website's critical consensus reads, "Beyond ravishing, Wings of Desire is Wim Wenders' aching and heartbreaking exploration of how love makes us human." The film ranked 34th in BBC's 2018 list of The 100 greatest foreign language films voted by 209 critics from 43 countries around the world.

=== Accolades ===
The film competed for the Palme d'Or and won for Best Director at the 1987 Cannes Film Festival. In 1988, it won the prestigious Grand Prix of the Belgian Film Critics Association.

It was submitted by West Germany for consideration for the Academy Award for Best Foreign Language Film, a bid supported by its distribution company. It was not nominated; the academy seldom recognized West German cinema.

Award	Date of ceremony	Category	Recipient(s)	Result	Ref(s)
Belgian Film Critics Association	1988	Grand Prix	Wim Wenders	Won	
British Academy Film Awards	19 March 1989	Best Film Not in the English Language	Wim Wenders and Anatole Dauman	Nominated	
Cannes Film Festival	7 – 19 May 1987	Best Director	Wim Wenders	Won	
César Awards	12 March 1988	Best Foreign Film	Wim Wenders	Nominated	
European Film Awards	1988	Best Film	Wim Wenders and Anatole Dauman	Nominated	
European Film Awards	1988	Best Director	Wim Wenders	Won	
European Film Awards	1988	Best Supporting Actor	Curt Bois	Won	
European Film Awards	1988	Best Camera	Henri Alekan	Nominated	
French Syndicate of Cinema Critics	1988	Best Foreign Film	Wim Wenders	Won	
German Film Award	1988	Best Fiction Film	Wim Wenders	Won	
German Film Award	1988	Best Cinematography	Henri Alekan	Won	
Independent Spirit Awards	25 March 1989	Best Foreign Film	Wim Wenders	Won	
Los Angeles Film Critics Association	10 December 1988	Best Foreign Language Film	Wim Wenders	Won	
Los Angeles Film Critics Association	10 December 1988	Best Cinematography	Henri Alekan	Won	
National Society of Film Critics	8 January 1989	Best Director	Wim Wenders	3rd place	
National Society of Film Critics	8 January 1989	Best Cinematography	Henri Alekan	Won	
New York Film Critics Circle	15 January 1989	Best Cinematography	Henri Alekan	Won	

== Legacy ==
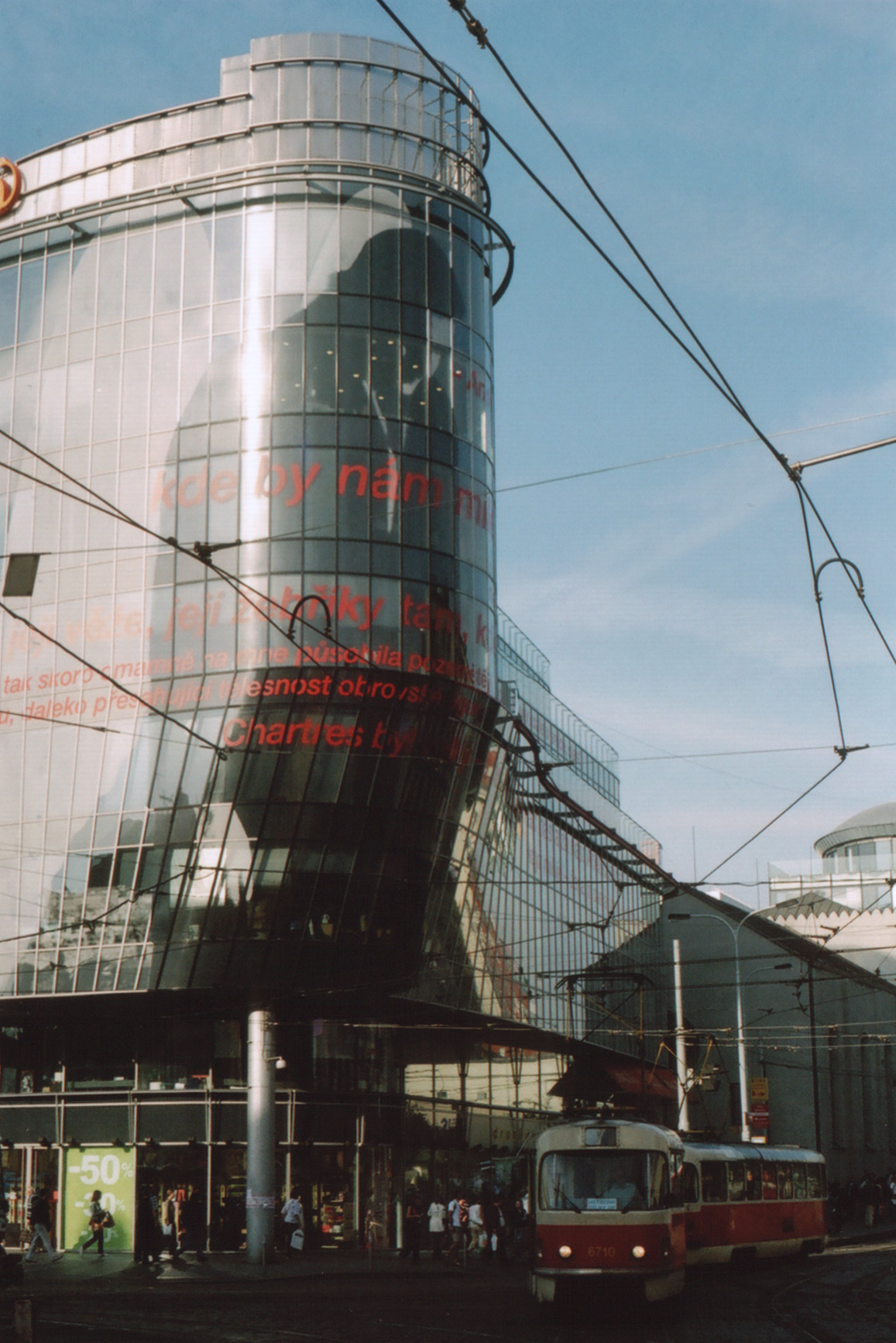
Prague's Angel by Jean Nouvel

In 1993, Wenders made a sequel, Faraway, So Close!, which he found desirable to explore Berlin post-reunification, more so than for the sake of a sequel. In 1998, a U.S. remake directed by Brad Silberling called City of Angels was released. The setting was moved to Los Angeles and Meg Ryan and Nicolas Cage starred. In 2023, a second American remake was announced to be in the works to be written and directed by Ashley Avis. In Prague, Czech Republic, architect Jean Nouvel designed Angel, a building that features an angel from the film observing the people of the Smíchov district.

A stage adaptation of Wings of Desire was created by the Northern Stage theatre company in Newcastle upon Tyne, U.K. in 2003. This particular adaptation, which used film footage of the city and stories from the community, was adapted and directed by Alan Lyddiard. In 2006, the American Repertory Theater in Cambridge, Massachusetts, and Toneelgroep Amsterdam presented another stage adaptation, created by Gideon Lester and Dirkje Houtman and directed by Ola Mafaalani.

Wenders' story was also an influence on the play Angels in America by Tony Kushner, in which angels intermingle with troubled mortals. R.E.M.'s music video for "Everybody Hurts" also takes cues from the film. Wings of Desire was possibly Ganz's most remembered role before Downfall in 2004.

Inspired by the movie, the queer arts and music festival, Wings of Desire was founded at underground techno club Bassiani in Tbilisi, Georgia, in 2023.

== See also ==
- List of cult films
- List of films about angels
- List of submissions to the 60th Academy Awards for Best Foreign Language Film
- List of German submissions for the Academy Award for Best Foreign Language Film
- August Sander's People of the 20th Century (1980 edition), the portrait photo book Homer studies during his library visit
