= C'est pas tout à fait la vie dont j'avais rêvé =

2005 film

- Directed by: Michel Piccoli
- Written by: Michel Piccoli
- Produced by: Paulo Branco
- Starring: Roger Jendly
- Cinematography: Sabine Lancelin
- Edited by: Catherine Quesemand
- Release date: 19 May 2005
- Running time: 75 minutes
- Country: France
- Language: French

C'est pas tout à fait la vie dont j'avais rêvé is a 2005 French drama film directed by Michel Piccoli. It was screened out of competition at the 2005 Cannes Film Festival.

== Cast ==
- Roger Jendly - Le mari
- Michèle Gleizer - La femme
- Elisabeth Margoni - La maîtresse
- Monique Éberlé - La gouvernante
- Nicolas Barbot - Le petit garçon
