= 1988 National Society of Film Critics Awards =

Annual US film awards ceremony

23rd NSFC Awards

January 9, 1989

Best Film:
The Unbearable
Lightness of Being

The 23rd National Society of Film Critics Awards, given on 9 January 1989, honored the best filmmaking of 1988.

== Winners ==
=== Best Picture ===
1. The Unbearable Lightness of Being
2. Women on the Verge of a Nervous Breakdown (Mujeres al borde de un ataque de nervios)
3. Wings of Desire (Der Himmel über Berlin)
3. A World Apart

=== Best Director ===
1. Philip Kaufman – The Unbearable Lightness of Being
2. Chris Menges – A World Apart
3. Wim Wenders – Wings of Desire (Der Himmel über Berlin)

=== Best Actor ===
1. Michael Keaton – Beetlejuice and Clean and Sober
2. Gene Hackman – Mississippi Burning
3. Dustin Hoffman – Rain Man
3. Max von Sydow – Pelle the Conqueror (Pelle erobreren)

=== Best Actress ===
1. Judy Davis – High Tide
2. Carmen Maura – Women on the Verge of a Nervous Breakdown (Mujeres al borde de un ataque de nervios)
3. Melanie Griffith – Working Girl
3. Barbara Hershey – A World Apart

=== Best Supporting Actor ===
1. Dean Stockwell – Married to the Mob and Tucker: The Man and His Dream
2. Alec Guinness – Little Dorrit
3. Tim Robbins – Bull Durham

=== Best Supporting Actress ===
1. Mercedes Ruehl – Married to the Mob
2. Lena Olin – The Unbearable Lightness of Being
3. Michelle Pfeiffer – Dangerous Liaisons

=== Best Screenplay ===
1. Ron Shelton – Bull Durham
2. David Cronenberg and Norman Snider – Dead Ringers
3. Shawn Slovo – A World Apart

=== Best Cinematography ===
1. Henri Alekan – Wings of Desire (Der Himmel über Berlin)
2. Sven Nykvist – The Unbearable Lightness of Being
3. Philippe Rousselot – Dangerous Liaisons
3. Conrad L. Hall – Tequila Sunrise
3. Vittorio Storaro – Tucker: The Man and His Dream

=== Best Documentary ===
1. The Thin Blue Line
2. Hôtel Terminus: The Life and Times of Klaus Barbie
3. Tokyo Olympiad (Tôkyô orimpikku)

=== Special Award ===
- Pedro Almodóvar
