= Curt Bois =

German actor (1901–1991)

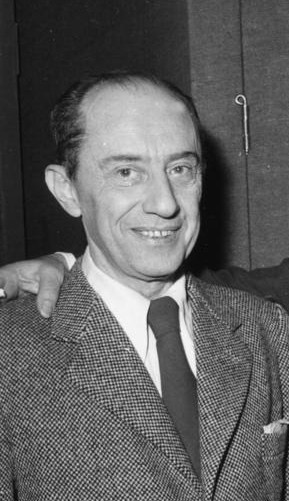
- Bois in Berlin Schillertheater (1959)
- Born: Kurt Boas; April 5, 1901; Berlin, German Empire
- Died: December 25, 1991 (aged 90); Berlin, Germany
- Occupation: Actor
- Years active: 1907–1989
- Spouses: Hedwig Ury (m. 1931; died 1962): Dagmar Bois (m. 19??; his death 1991)

Curt Bois (born Kurt Boas; April 5, 1901 – December 25, 1991) was a German actor with a career spanning over 80 years. He is best remembered for his performances as the pickpocket in Casablanca (1942) and the poet Homer in Wings of Desire (1987).

== Life and career ==
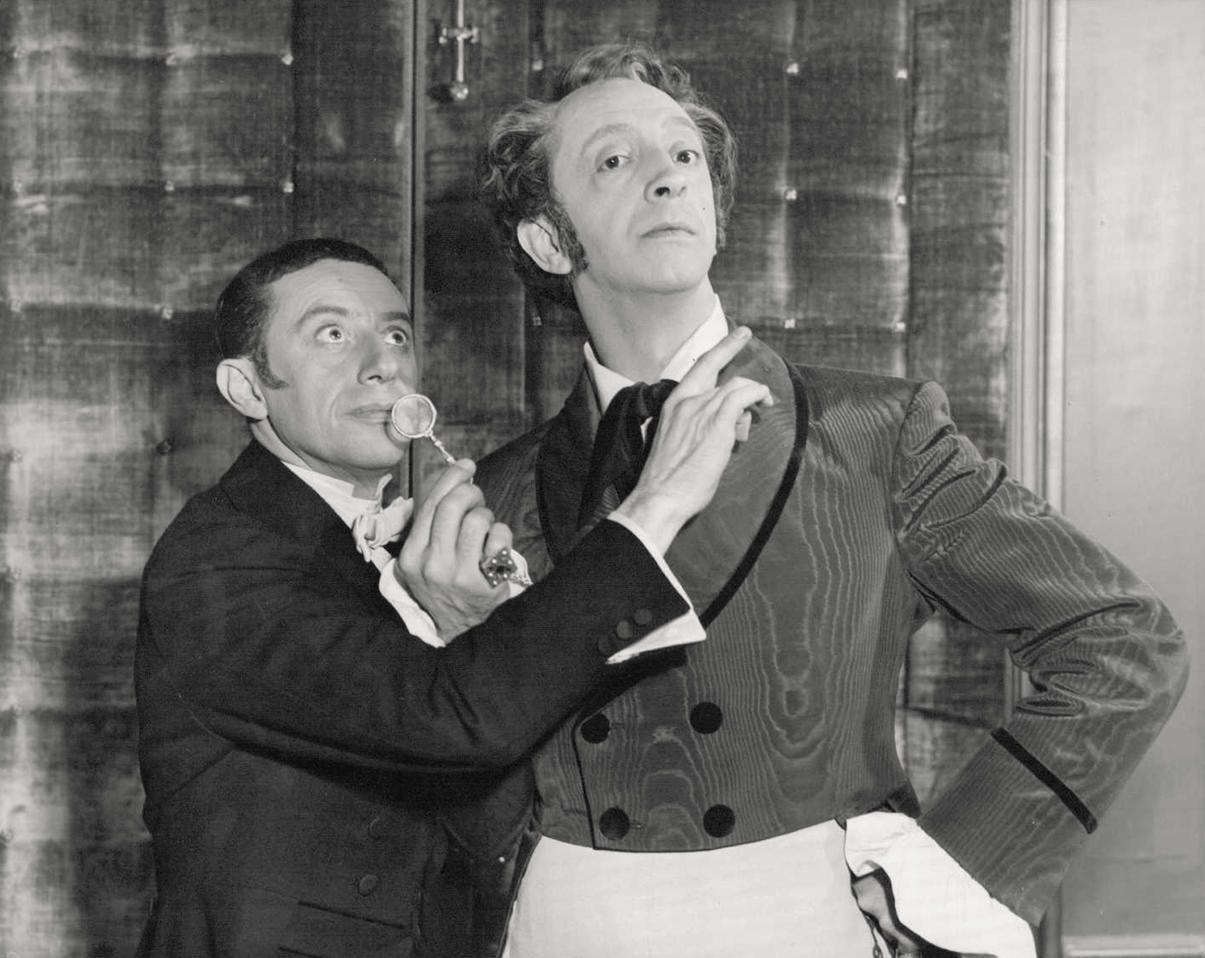
Curt Bois (left) and John Abbott in The Woman in White

Bois was born to a German Jewish family in Berlin and began acting in 1907, becoming one of the film world's first child actors, with a role in the 1907 short film Bauernhaus und Grafenschloß. In 1909, he played the title role in Der Kleine Detektiv ('The Little Detective'). Bois performed in theatre, cabaret, musicals, silent films, and "talkies" over his long acting career. He performed under Max Reinhardt and found success in 1928 in a Viennese stage production of "Charley's Aunt" at the Josefstadt Theater. He was a successful character comic, and for a while film studios tried to make him into a "German Harold Lloyd".

In 1934, institutionalized Anti-Semitism forced the Jewish Bois to leave his home in Nazi Germany for the United States. There he found work on stage on Broadway. By 1937, he had made his way to Hollywood and began acting in films, the best-known being Casablanca (1942), in which he warns a befuddled English gentleman to be on guard against pickpockets ("vultures everywhere") while stealing the man's wallet. He had a notable supporting role in Caught (1949), starring Robert Ryan, Barbara Bel Geddes, and James Mason; Ryan played a megalomaniacal industrialist openly based on Howard Hughes and Bois was Ryan's conflicted fixer, Franzi Kartos. Most of his Hollywood roles were small, but nevertheless Bois was in demand. After World War II, Bois decided it was safe to return to Germany, which he did in 1950.

Bois finished his life and career in Germany, first in the East, and then in the West. He appeared at the Schiller Theater and the Theater des Westens for many years. One of his final performances was in Wim Wenders' Der Himmel über Berlin (Wings of Desire) in 1987, portraying the aged poet Homer "who endlessly wanders Berlin in the hope of properly capturing the city on paper". He won the European Film Award for Best Supporting Actor for this role. He played his last role in the 1989 short film Das letzte Band, ending a film career of 82 years. Bois died in Berlin at the age of 90.

== Complete filmography ==
- Bauernhaus und Grafenschloß (1907 short)
- Der fidele Bauer – 1. Terzett: Ein Infant'rist, ein Artill'rist (1908 short)
- Der fidele Bauer – 2. Terzett: Bauernmarsch (1908 short)
- Der fidele Bauer – 3. Duettino zwischen Liesl und Heinerle (1908 short)
- Der kleine Detektiv (1909 short)
- Mutterliebe (1909 short)
- Klebolin klebt alles (1909 short)
- Ein neuer Erwerbszweig (1912 short)
- Des Pfarrers Töchterlein (The Minister's Daughter) (1913 short)
- Das Geschenk des Inders (1914) as Child
- Streichhölzer, kauft Streichhölzer! (1916)
- BZ-Maxe & Co. (1916)
- Bobby als Amor (1916)
- Tante Röschen will heiraten (1916)
- Die Spinne (1917)
- Abenteuer im Warenhaus (1917 short)
- Das Klima am Vaucourt (1917)
- Das Unruhige Hotel (1917)
- Der Dieb (1918) as Hellmuth
- Der goldene Pol (1918)
- Der Gast aus der vierten Dimension (1918)
- So'n kleiner Schwerenöter (1918 short)
- The Oyster Princess (1919) as Conductor
- She and the Three (1922) as Der Hilfsregisseur
- When She Starts, Look Out (1926) as Ali ben Mokka
- Der goldene Schmetterling (The Golden Butterfly) (1926) as André Dubois, Ballettmeister
- The Young Man from the Ragtrade (1926) as Moritz Spiegel
- Countess Ironing-Maid (1926)
- The Prince of Pappenheim (1927) as Egon Fürst
- The Transformation of Dr. Bessel (1927) as Simche Regierer
- Majestät schneidet Bubiköpfe (1928)
- Anschluß um Mitternacht (Call at Midnight) (1929) as Emil
- The Schlemihl (1931) as Hartwig
- Ein steinreicher Mann (A Tremendously Rich Man) (1932) as Curt
- Hollywood Hotel (1937) as Dress Designer
- Tovarich (1937) as Alfonso
- Romance in the Dark (1938) as Von Hemisch
- Gold Diggers in Paris (1938) as Padrinsky
- The Amazing Dr. Clitterhouse (1938) as Rabbit
- Boy Meets Girl (1938) as Dance Director (uncredited)
- Garden of the Moon (1938) as Maharajah of Sund
- The Great Waltz (1938) as Kienzl
- Hotel Imperial (1939) as Anton
- The Hunchback of Notre Dame (1939) as Student
- The Lady in Question (1940) as Henri Lurette
- Boom Town (1940) as Ferdie
- He Stayed for Breakfast (1940) as Comrade Tronavich
- Hullabaloo (1940) as Armand Francois
- Bitter Sweet (1940) as Ernst
- That Night in Rio (1941) as Salles
- Hold Back the Dawn (1941) as Bonbois
- Blue, White and Perfect (1942) as Friedrich Gerber, alias Nappy Dubois
- The Tuttles of Tahiti (1942) as Jensen
- My Gal Sal (1942) as De Rochemont
- Pacific Rendezvous (1942) as Kestrin
- Casablanca (1942) as Pickpocket
- Destroyer (1943) as Yasha (uncredited)
- Paris After Dark (1943) as Max (uncredited)
- Princess O'Rourke (1943) as Count Peter de Candome
- Swing Fever (1943) as Nick Sirocco
- The Desert Song (1943) as François
- Cover Girl (1944) as Chef at Danny McGuire's
- Gypsy Wildcat (1944) as Valdi
- Blonde Fever (1944) as Brillon
- The Spanish Main (1945) as Paree
- Saratoga Trunk (1945) as Augustin Haussy
- Jungle Flight (1947) as Pepe
- The Woman from Tangier (1948) as Parquit
- Arch of Triumph (1948) as Tattooed Waiter
- French Leave (1948) as Marcel
- The Woman in White (1948) as Louis
- Up in Central Park (1948) as Maitre d' (uncredited)
- Let's Live a Little (1948) as Chemist (uncredited)
- Caught (1949) as Franzi Kartos
- Kiss in the Dark (1949) as Hugo Schloss
- The Lovable Cheat (1949) as Count de la Brive
- The Great Sinner (1949) as Jeweler / Money Lender
- Oh, You Beautiful Doll (1949) as Zaltz (uncredited)
- Joe Palooka Meets Humphrey (1950) as Pierre
- Fortunes of Captain Blood (1950) as King Charles II
- Androklus und der Löwe (Androcles and the Lion) (1958 TV film) as Androklus
- Herr Puntila and His Servant Matti (1955–1960) as Johannes Puntila
- The Haunted Castle (1960) as Hugo
- Flüchtlingsgespräche (1964 TV film) as Ziffel
- Der eingebildete Kranke (1964 TV film) as Argan
- Honour Among Thieves (1966) as Emil
- Die hundertste Nacht (1966 TV film) as Iwakichi
- Bert Brecht vor dem McCarthy-Ausschuß (1966 TV film)
- Der Zauberberg (1968 TV film) as Naphta
- Amerika oder der Verschollene (1968 TV film) as Karl Roßmann's father
- Der Pott (1971 TV film) as Simon Norton
- Der trojanische Sessel (1971 TV film) as Franz Seider
- Strychnin und saure Drops (1974 TV film)
- Das Rentenspiel (1977 TV film) as Grandfather
- Das Idol von Mordassow (1979 TV film)
- Liebe, Tod und Heringshäppchen (1979 TV film) as Friedrich Schlick
- Die Alten kommen (1980 TV film)
- Wochenendgeschichten (1980 TV film)
- Bühne frei für Kolowitz (1980 TV film) as Benjamin Weiß
- Der Mond scheint auf Kylenamoe (1980 TV film)
- Gesucht wird... Drei Geschichten um nicht ganz ehrenwerte Herren (1980 TV film)
- Das Boot ist voll (1981) as Lazar Ostrowskij
- Flächenbrand (1981 TV film) as Bühler
- Der Schützling (1981 TV film) as Leiser
- Die feine englische Art: Täglich eine gute Tat (1982 TV film) as Lord Emsworth
- Die feine englische Art: Hundeglück (1982 TV film) as Lord Emsworth
- Die feine englische Art: Die Lady frißt (1982 TV film) as Lord Emsworth
- Die feine englische Art: Blut wird fließen (1982 TV film) as Lord Emsworth
- The Roaring Fifties (1983) (uncredited)
- Wings of Desire (1987) as Homer

== Bibliography ==
- John Holmstrom, The Moving Picture Boy: An International Encyclopaedia from 1895 to 1995, Norwich, Michael Russell, 1996, pp. 18–19.
