= No Man's Land (1985 film) =

- Official poster
- Directed by: Alain Tanner
- Screenplay by: Alain Tanner
- Produced by: Alain Tanner; Marin Karmitz
- Starring: Hugues Quester; Jean-Philippe Écoffey; Myriam Mézières; Betty Berr; Marie-Luce Felber
- Cinematography: Bernard Zitzermann
- Edited by: Laurent Uhler
- Music by: Terry Riley
- Production companies: Channel Four Films; Filmograph S.A.; Films A2; MK2 Productions; Télévision Suisse Romande; Westdeutscher Rundfunk
- Release date: 1985
- Running time: 110 minutes
- Countries: Switzerland; France; West Germany; United Kingdom
- Language: French

No Man's Land is a 1985 drama film directed and written by Alain Tanner, about a group of young people on the French-Swiss border. The film was shown in competition at the Venice Film Festival in 1985.

== Synopsis ==
Set in the border region between France and Switzerland, the film follows a group of young people, including Madeleine, Paul, Mali and Jean, as they try to escape their bleak circumstances. A nightclub in a former customs house on the Swiss-French border serves as a meeting place for people whose lives revolve around the border. Madeleine wants to leave the borderland and become a singer in Paris, while Paul is hired to smuggle gold, a venture that costs him his life. Mali works in Switzerland, while Jean sees himself as rooted to the land but becomes involved in petty criminality.

== Cast ==
The cast includes:

- Hugues Quester as Paul
- Myriam Mézières as Madeleine
- Jean-Philippe Écoffey as Jean
- Betty Berr as Mali
- Marie-Luce Felber as Lucie
- Maria Cabral as a hitchhiker
- Teco Celio as an informant
- Adrien Nicati as Paul's father
- Maurice Aufair as Jean's uncle

== Production ==
Tanner said the film was about characters trying to find their place in a society in crisis, describing it as a film about the dissolution of contemporary life and its structures.

== Reception ==
=== Awards and nominations ===
The film was entered in competition at the 42nd Venice International Film Festival in 1985.

=== Critical response ===
Vincent Canby of The New York Times wrote that the film was "completely humorless and cold", adding that it was memorable only for its "picturesque landscapes and cloud formations". Filmdienst described the film as austere and beautiful, restrained, and compellingly told. The Cinémathèque suisse described the film as a beautiful, sad film.

== Festival screenings ==
The film premiered in 1985. In later years, it was screened at festivals including Cineuropa in Santiago de Compostela in 2021 and Entrevues Belfort in 2025.
