= Mit meinen heißen Tränen =

- Directed by: Fritz Lehner
- Starring: Udo Samel; Daniel Olbrychski; Wojciech Pszoniak; Traugott Buhre; Maja Komorowska; Gabriel Barylli
- Music by: Franz Schubert; Johann Strauss
- Country of origin: West Germany; Austria; Switzerland
- Original language: German
- No. of episodes: 3

Production
- Producers: ORF; ZDF; SRG
- Cinematography: Gernot Roll
- Running time: 285 minutes

Original release
- Release: 28 October – 2 November 1986

Mit meinen heißen Tränen (English: With My Hot Tears) is a West German-Austrian-Swiss three-part television miniseries which depicts the final years of the life of 19th century Austrian composer Franz Schubert. It was released on 31 October 1986 in Germany, Austria, and The Netherlands.

== Cast ==
- Udo Samel as Franz Schubert
- Daniel Olbrychski as Franz von Schober
- Wojciech Pszoniak as Kajetan
- Traugott Buhre as Schuberts Vater
- Maja Komorowska as Anna Schubert
- Gabriel Barylli as Moritz von Schwind
- Florentin Groll as Joseph von Spaun
- Vitus Zeplichal as Josef Hüttenbrenner
- Wolf-Dietrich Sprenger as Johann Mayrhofer
- Therese Affolter as Magdalena
- Erni Mangold as Gräfin Rieder
- Dorothea Neff as Die alte Gräfin
- Christian Altenburger as Johann Strauss
- Michaela Widhalm as Schuberts Halbschwester Josefa
- Monica Bleibtreu as Ferdinand Schuberts Frau
- Despina Pajanou as Frau von gegenüber
- Jessica Kosmalla as Hure
- Charlotte Acklin as Bettina
- Dagmar Schwarz as Johanna
- Sylvia Haider as Maria
- Annette Uhlen as Lisette
- Huberta Haubmann as Kathinka

== Release ==
The series was released on 31 October 1986 in Germany, Austria, and The Netherlands.

== Accolades ==
Lead actor Udo Samel was nominated for the 1986 European Film Award for Best Actor.
