= 4th European Film Awards =

1991 film awards ceremony in Germany

The 4th Annual European Film Awards were given out in 1991. The ceremony was organised by the European Film Academy, and took place at the DEFA Studios in Potsdam (Germany). The winners were announced on 1 December, with Ken Loach receiving the Felix for European Film of the Year for his feature film Riff-Raff.

== Winners ==
=== European Film of the Year ===
English title	Original title	Director(s)	Country
Riff-Raff		Ken Loach	United Kingdom
The Voyager	Homo Faber	Volker Schlöndorff	Germany
The Little Gangster	Le petit criminel	Jacques Doillon	France

=== Young European Film of the Year ===
English title	Original title	Director(s)	Country
Toto the Hero	Toto le héros	Jaco Van Dormael	Belgium
Delicatessen		Marc Caro, Jean-Pierre Jeunet	France
Ultra	Ultrà	Ricky Tognazzi	Italy

=== European Actor of the Year ===
- Michel Bouquet — Toto le héros (Toto the Hero)

=== European Actress of the Year ===
- Clotilde Courau — Le petit Criminel (The Little Gangster)

=== European Supporting Actor of the Year ===
- Ricky Memphis — Ultrà (Ultra)

=== European Supporting Actress of the Year ===
- Marta Keler — Virdžina

=== European Screen-Writer of the Year ===
- Jaco van Dormael — Toto le héros (Toto the Hero)

=== European Cinematographer of the Year ===
- Walther van den Ende — Toto le héros (Toto the Hero)

=== European Film Composer of the Year ===
- Hilmar Örn Hilmarsson — Börn náttúrunnar (Children of Nature)

=== European Production Designers of the Year ===
- Kreta Kjnaković (sets) and Valerie Pozzo Di Borgo (costumes) — Delicatessen

=== European Film Editor of the Year ===
- Giancarla Simoncelli — Ultrà (Ultra)

=== European Cinema Lifetime Achievement Award ===
- Alexandre Trauner

=== European Cinema Society Award of Merit ===
- Directors' Fortnight in Cannes (La Quinzaine des Réalisateurs)

=== European Documentary Film of the Year ===
- Usłyszcie mój krzyk (Hear My Cry), by Maciej Janusz Drygas, Prod. Film Studio Zodiak Warsaw, Poland

=== Special Mentions ===
- Crimes et passions – La cicatrice (Crimes and Passions – The Scar), by Mireille Dumas Prod. TF1 Paris, France
- Die Mauer (The Wall), by Jürgen Böttcher, Prod. DEFA-Studio for Dokumentarfilme Berlin, Germany
