= Riff-Raff (1991 film) =

- Directed by: Ken Loach
- Written by: Bill Jesse
- Produced by: Sally Hibbin
- Starring: Robert Carlyle; Emer McCourt; Ricky Tomlinson; Jimmy Coleman
- Cinematography: Barry Ackroyd
- Edited by: Jonathan Morris
- Music by: Stewart Copeland
- Production company: Parallax Pictures
- Distributed by: Channel Four Films
- Release dates: 14 May 1991 (Cannes Film Festival); 21 June 1991 (United Kingdom)
- Running time: 95 minutes
- Country: United Kingdom
- Language: English
- Budget: £750,000

Riff-Raff is a 1991 British drama film directed by Ken Loach, starring Robert Carlyle and Ricky Tomlinson (the latter plays, and was in real life, a builder). It won the 1991 European Film Award Best Picture award.

As with most Loach films, Riff-Raff is a portrayal of modern Britain. It follows Stevie, played by Robert Carlyle, a Glaswegian recently released from prison who has moved to London and got a job on a building site turning a derelict hospital into luxury apartments.

== Synopsis ==
Patrick 'Stevie' Logan is sleeping rough in London and seeks employment on a non-union building site. Learning that he is homeless, Stevie's new workmates Larry, Mo and Shem volunteer to find him an empty flat to squat in on a nearby housing estate.

Stevie meets struggling Irish actress and singer Susan (Emer McCourt) when he finds and returns a handbag belonging to her. This chance encounter leads to a turbulent relationship.

Stevie rounds up some of the men from the building site to support Susan at one of her pub gigs where she sings "Always on My Mind". The audience is initially hostile, but Larry shames them into calling Susan back for an encore, and she sings "With a Little Help from My Friends", which is much better received. Susan agrees to move into Stevie's flat, where they are happy for a time.

On the building site, life continues as a series of small escapades and petty misdemeanors. Larry is vocal in his left-wing views and opposition to Margaret Thatcher and the ruling Conservative party. No-one shares his view that politics is important to their real-life situation. Meanwhile, the management sack men for minor misbehaviour and are only superficially interested in safety.

Stevie and Susan's relationship becomes strained. Susan tends towards negative emotions associated with her lack of career success. Stevie, on the other hand, can be callous and unsympathetic.

After hearing his name on radio Stevie finds out that his mother has died so leaves to attend her funeral in Scotland. In his absence Susan starts using the heroin dealt by youths on the estate. This precipitates the end of their relationship and Susan's sudden departure.

Larry is sacked from the site after requesting safer working conditions. After jokingly making an expensive phone call on the boss' mobile phone, Shem also gets the sack (and is arrested for the assault that follows).

Desmonde, a young construction worker, falls off the roof of the converted hospital and despite Stevie and Mo's efforts to save him he loses grip and falls to the ground and is severely injured. The cause of the accident is unsafe scaffolding, which the men have already been warned about. Stevie and Mo return in the middle of the night and set a huge fire in the building.

== Cast ==
- Robert Carlyle as Patrick 'Stevie' Logan
- Emer McCourt as Susan
- Ricky Tomlinson as Larry
- Jimmy Coleman as Shem
- George Moss as Mo
- Ade Sapara as Fiaman
- Derek Young as Desmonde
- Peter Mullan as Jake

== Soundtrack ==
- "Always on My Mind", composed by Johnny Christopher, Francis Zambon and Wayne Carson Thompson
- "With a Little Help from My Friends", composed by John Lennon and Paul McCartney
- "Won't You Charleston with Me", composed by Sandy Wilson
- "I'm So Excited", composed by Trevor Lawrence (musician), Anita Pointer, June Pointer and Ruth Pointer
- "Spread a Little Happiness", composed by Vivian Ellis and Clifford Grey
- "Good Morning", written by Nacio Herb Brown and Arthur Freed
- "Everytime I Say Goodbye", composed by Cole Porter and performed by Emer McCourt
- "The Sun Has Got His Hat On", composedd by Ralph T. Butler and Noel Gay and performed by Emer McCourt

== Reception ==
Rotten Tomatoes gives the film a rating of 91%, based on 11 reviews.

The film was nominated for the Grand Prix of the Belgian Syndicate of Cinema Critics.

Its US screenings were accompanied by subtitles.
