= 5th European Film Awards =

1992 film awards ceremony in Germany

- Date: November 25, 1992
- Site: Babelsberg Studio, Potsdam, Germany
- Hosted by: Senta Berger, Ben Kingsley
- Organized by: European Film Academy

Highlights
- Best Picture: The Stolen Children
- Best Actor: Matti Pellonpää; La Vie de Bohème
- Best Actress: Juliette Binoche; The Lovers on the Bridge
- Most awards: The Lovers on the Bridge (3), The Northerners (3)
- Most nominations: The Lovers on the Bridge (5), La Vie de Bohème

The 5th European Film Awards were presented on November 25, 1992, in Potsdam, Germany. The winners were selected by the members of the European Film Academy.

== Awards ==
=== Best Film ===
English title	Original title	Director(s)	Country
The Stolen Children	Il ladro di bambini	Gianni Amelio	Italy
La Vie de Bohème		Aki Kaurismäki	France
The Lovers on the Bridge	Les Amants du Pont-Neuf	Leos Carax	France
North	Nord	Xavier Beauvois	France
Three Days	Trys dienos	Šarūnas Bartas	Lithuania
The Northerners	De Noorderlingen	Alex van Warmerdam	Netherlands

=== Lifetime Achievement Award ===
Recipient	Occupation
(Austria) Billy Wilder	filmmaker, screenwriter, producer
