= List of Romanian European Film Award winners and nominees =

This is a list of Romanian European Film Award winners and nominees. This list details the performances of Romanian actors, actresses, and films that have either been submitted or nominated for, or have won, a European Film Award.

== Main categories ==
Year	Award	Recipient	Status	Note
1988	Best Film	Jacob	Nominated	
1993	Best Actress	Maia Morgenstern for The Oak	Won	
2003	Best Actress	Diana Dumbrava for Maria	Nominated	
2005	Best Screenwriter	Cristi Puiu; Razvan Radulescu for The Death of Mr. Lazarescu	Nominated	
2006	People's Choice Award for Best European Film	Merry Christmas	Nominated	French-German-British-Belgian-Romanian co-production
2006	Best Screenwriter	Corneliu Porumboiu for 12:08 East of Bucharest	Nominated	
2007	Best Film	4 Months, 3 Weeks and 2 Days	Won	
2007	Best Actress	Anamaria Marinca for 4 Months, 3 Weeks and 2 Days	Nominated	
2007	Best Screenwriter	Cristian Mungiu for 4 Months, 3 Weeks and 2 Days	Nominated	
2007	People's Choice Award for Best European Film	12:08 East of Bucharest	Nominated	
2009	European Discovery	Katalin Varga	Won	British-Romanian-Hungarian co-production
2010	European Discovery	If I Want to Whistle, I Whistle	Nominated	Romanian-German-Swedeish co-production
2010	Best Actor	George Piştereanu for If I Want to Whistle, I Whistle	Nominated	Romanian-German-Swedeish co-production
2010	Best Screenwriter	Radu Mihăileanu for The Concert	Nominated	Romanian-born France based
2012	Best Screenwriter	Cristian Mungiu for Beyond the Hills	Nominated	
2013	Best European Co-Producer	Ada Solomon	Won	
2013	Best Actress	Luminița Gheorghiu for Child's Pose	Nominated	

== See also ==
- List of Romanian submissions for the Academy Award for Best Foreign Language Film
