= European Film Award for Best Actress =

Annual award

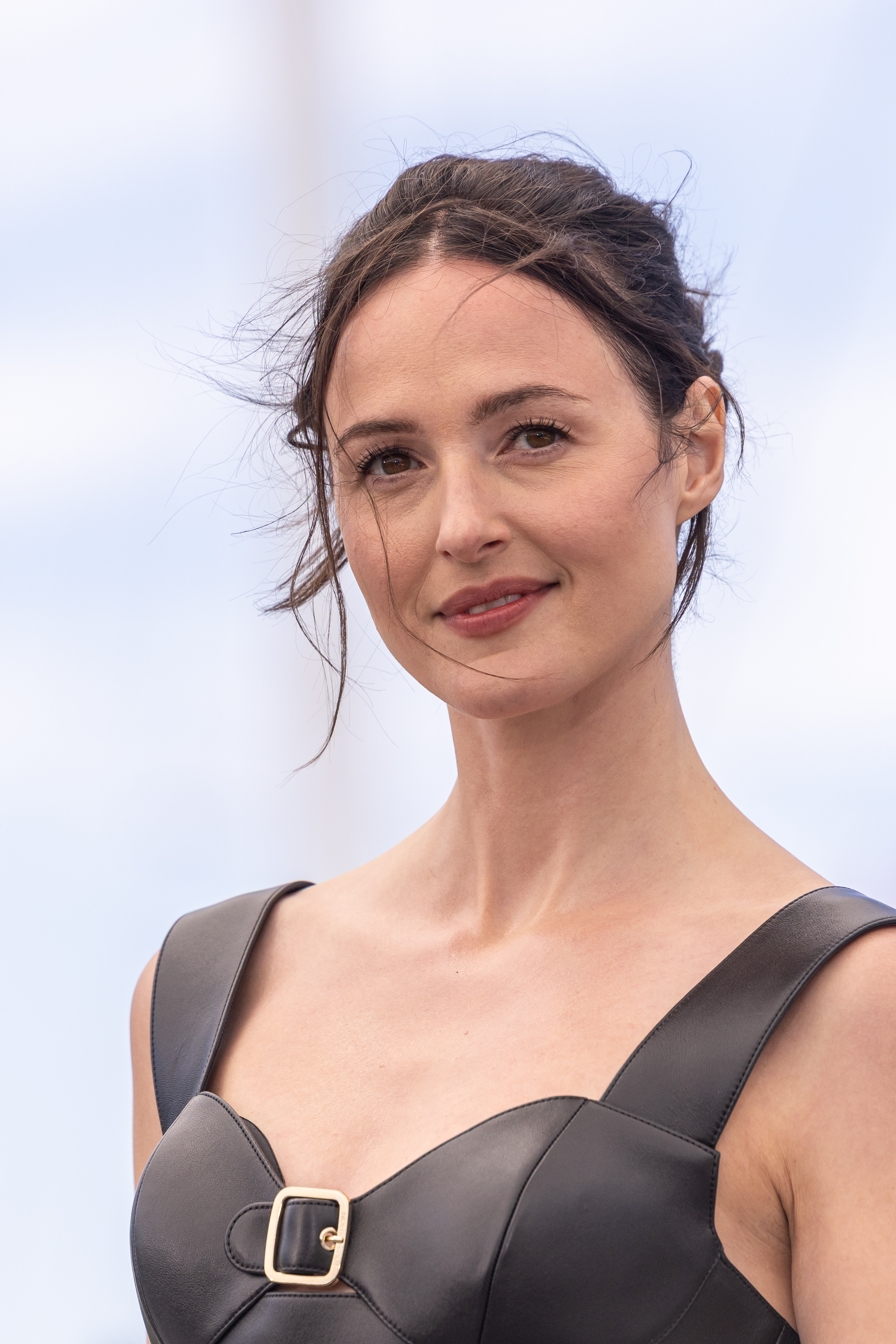
- The 2025 recipient: Renate Reinsve
- Awarded for: Best Performance by an Actress in a Leading Role
- Presented by: European Film Academy
- First award: Carmen Maura; Women on the Verge of a Nervous Breakdown (1988)
- Currently held by: Renate Reinsve; Sentimental Value (2025)
- Website: europeanfilmacademy.org

The European Film Award for Best Actress is an award given out at the annual European Film Awards to recognize an actress who has delivered an outstanding leading performance in a film industry. The awards are presented by the European Film Academy (EFA) and was first presented in 1988 to Spanish actress Carmen Maura for her role as Pepa in Women on the Verge of a Nervous Breakdown.

Carmen Maura, Juliette Binoche, Isabelle Huppert, Charlotte Rampling, and Sandra Hüller are the only actresses who have received this award more than once, with two wins each. Penélope Cruz and Sandra Hüller are the most nominated actresses in the category with six nominations each.

== Winners and nominees ==
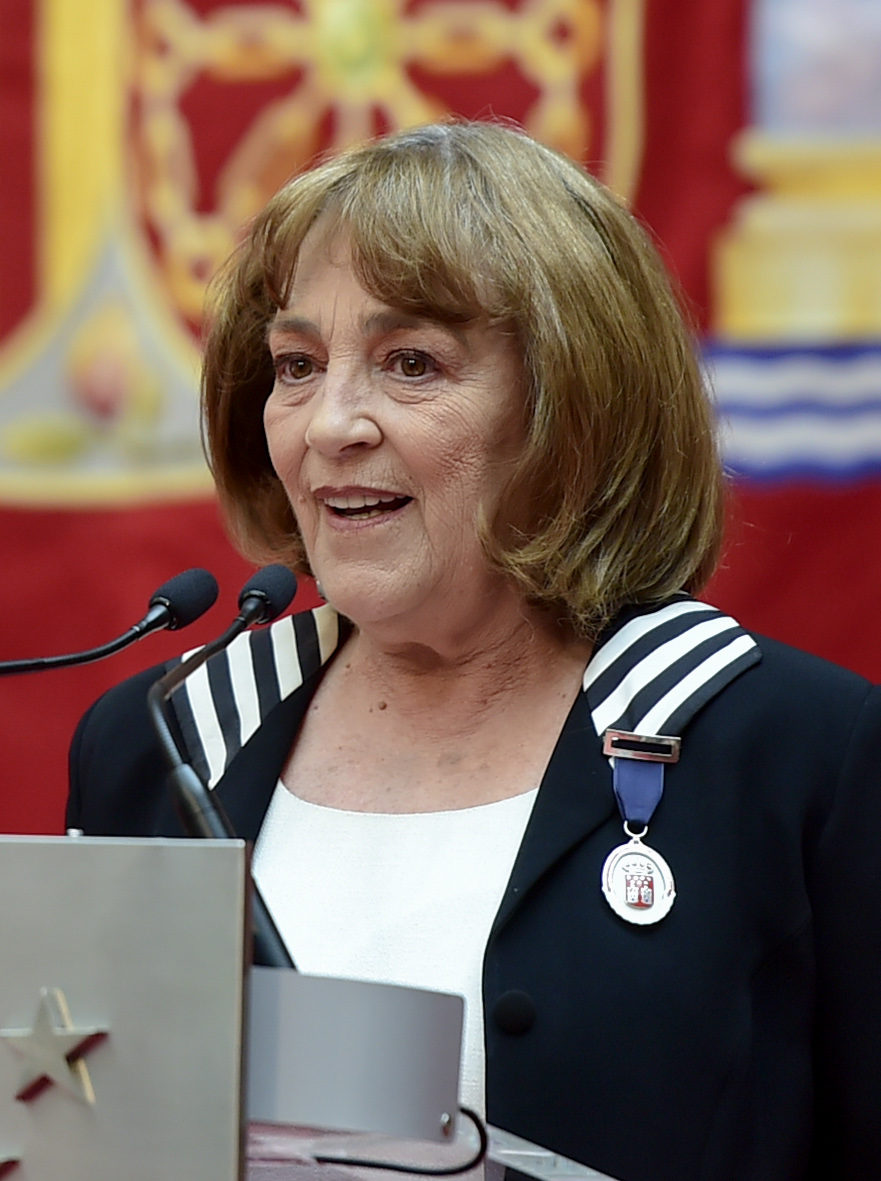
Carmen Maura won twice for her roles in Mujeres al borde de un Ataque de Nervios (1988) and ¡Ay Carmela! (1990).

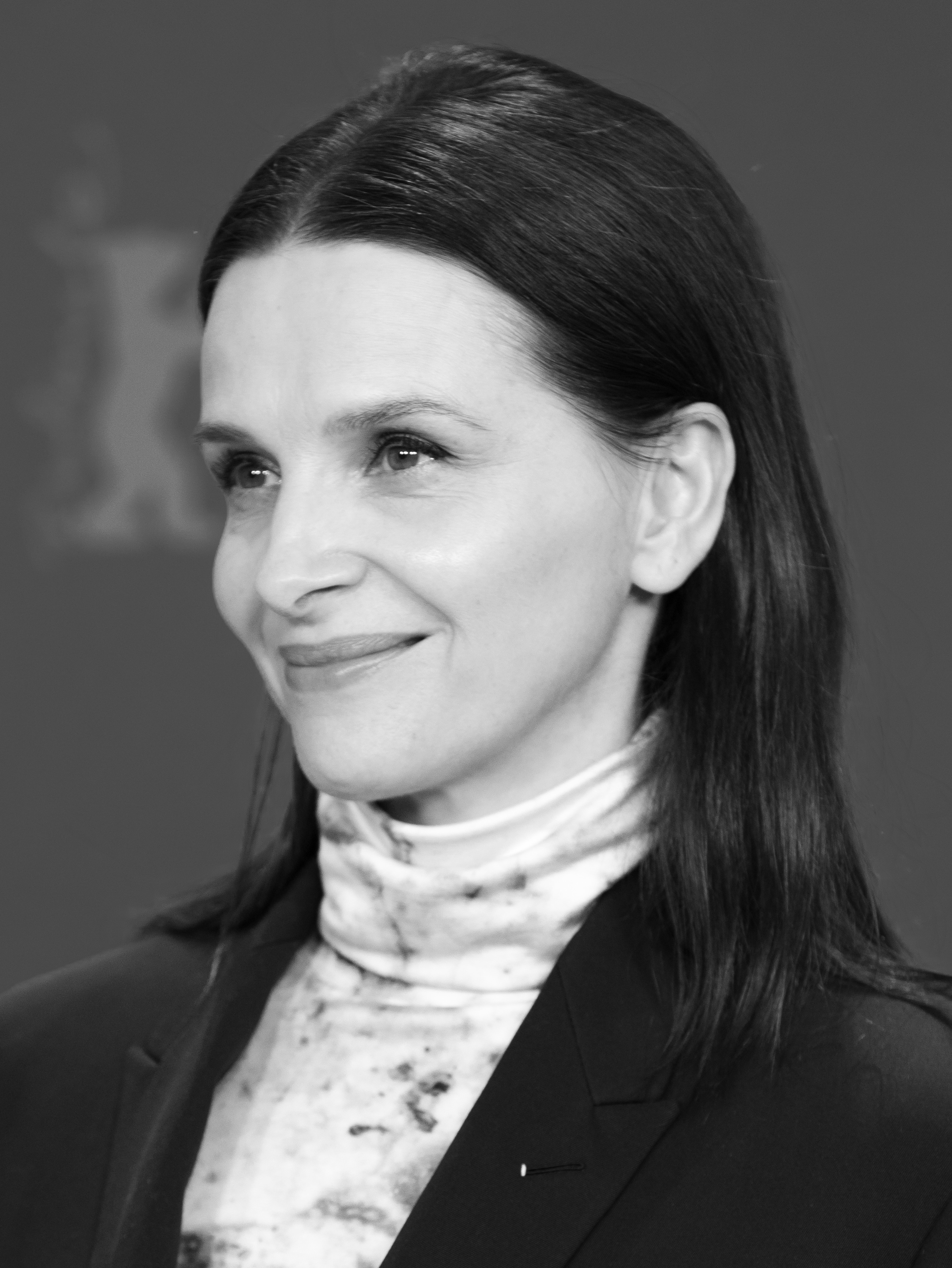
Juliette Binoche won twice for her roles in Les Amants du Pont-Neuf (1991) and The English Patient (1996).

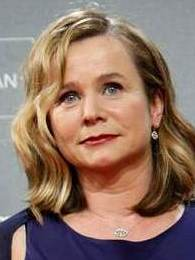
Emily Watson won for her role in Breaking the Waves (1996).

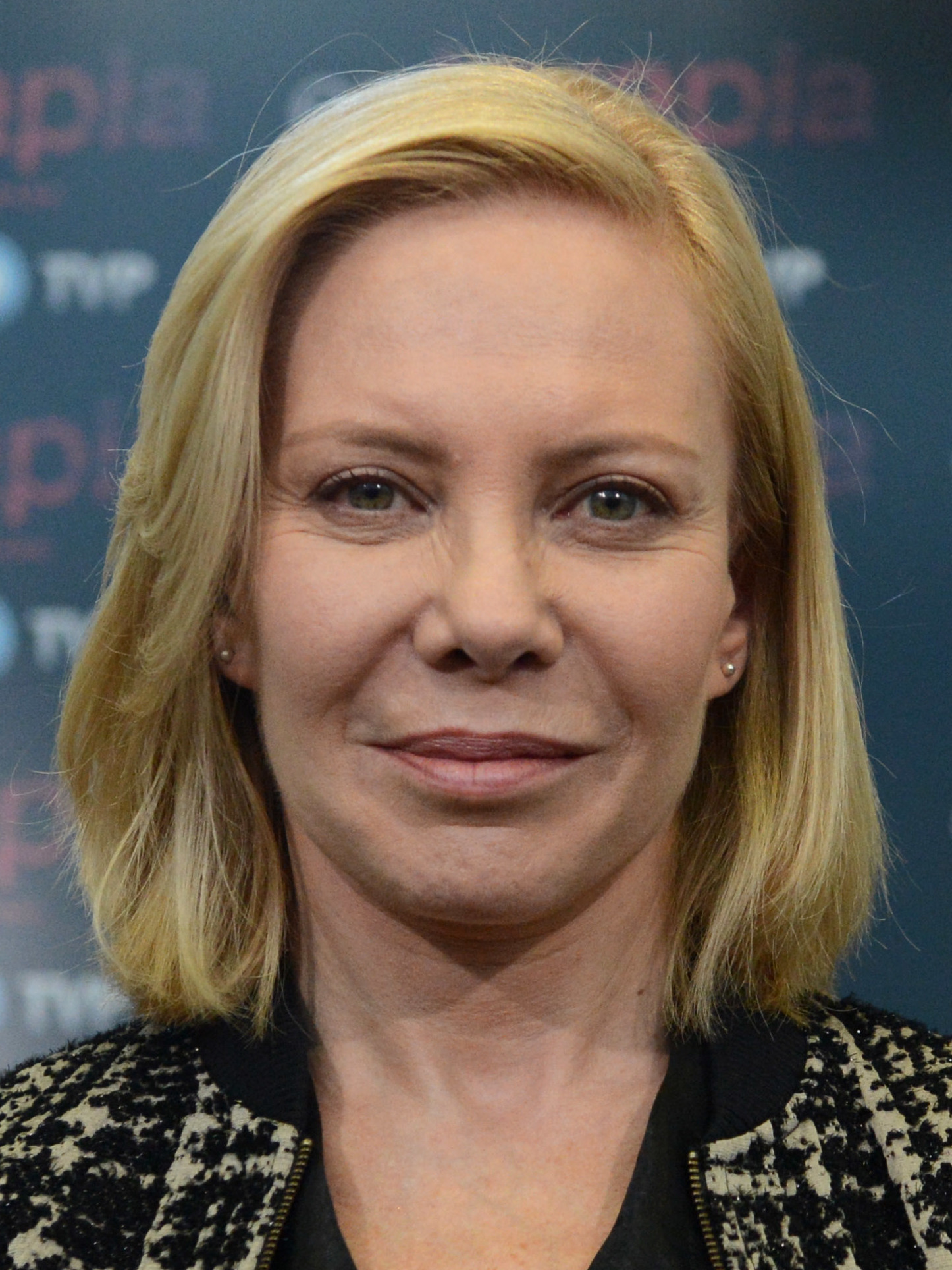
Cecilia Roth won for her role in Todo Sobre Mi Madre (1999).

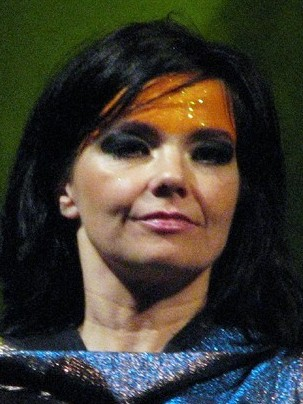
Björk won for her role in Dancer in the Dark (2000).

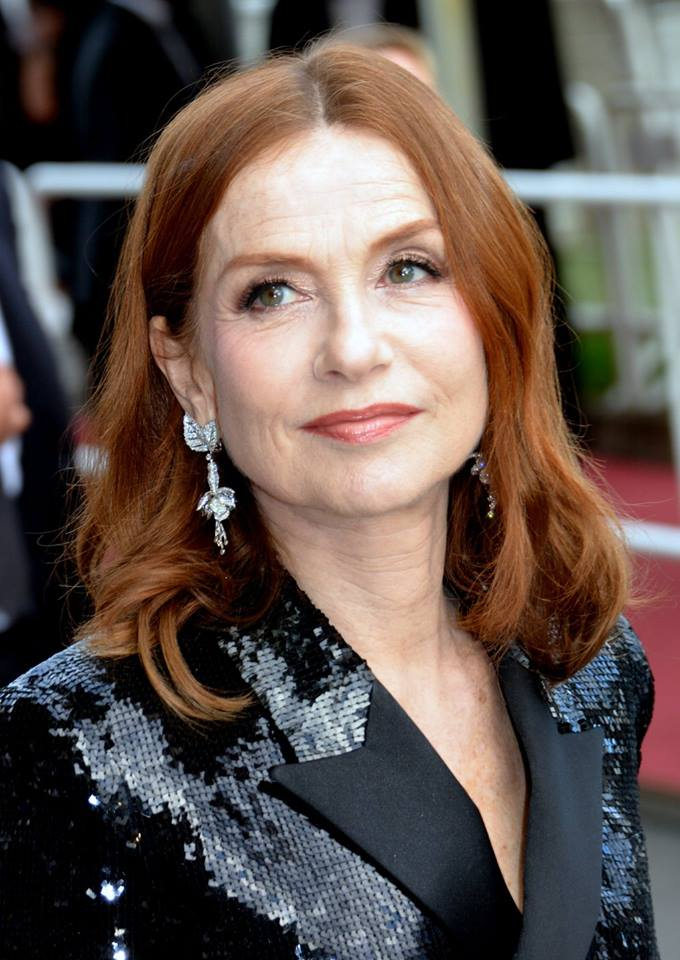
Isabelle Huppert won twice for her roles in La Pianiste (2001) and 8 Femmes (2002).

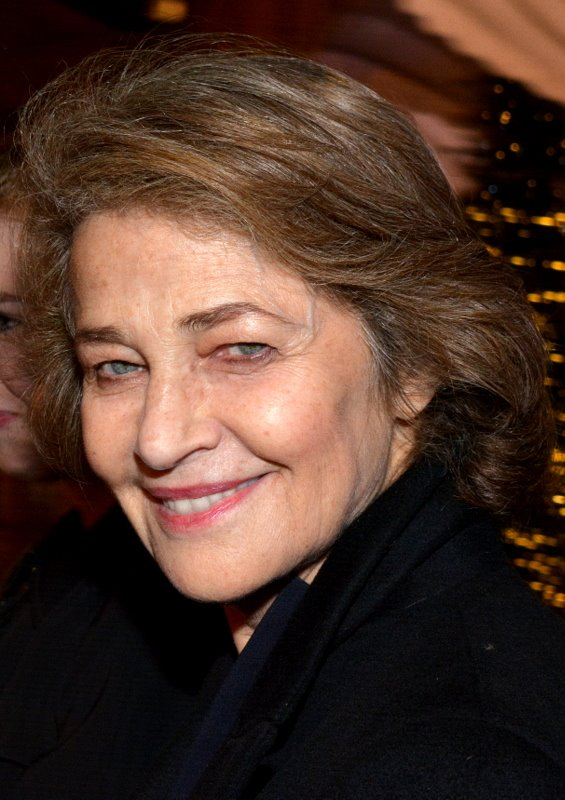
Charlotte Rampling won twice for her roles in Swimming Pool (2003) and 45 Years (2015).

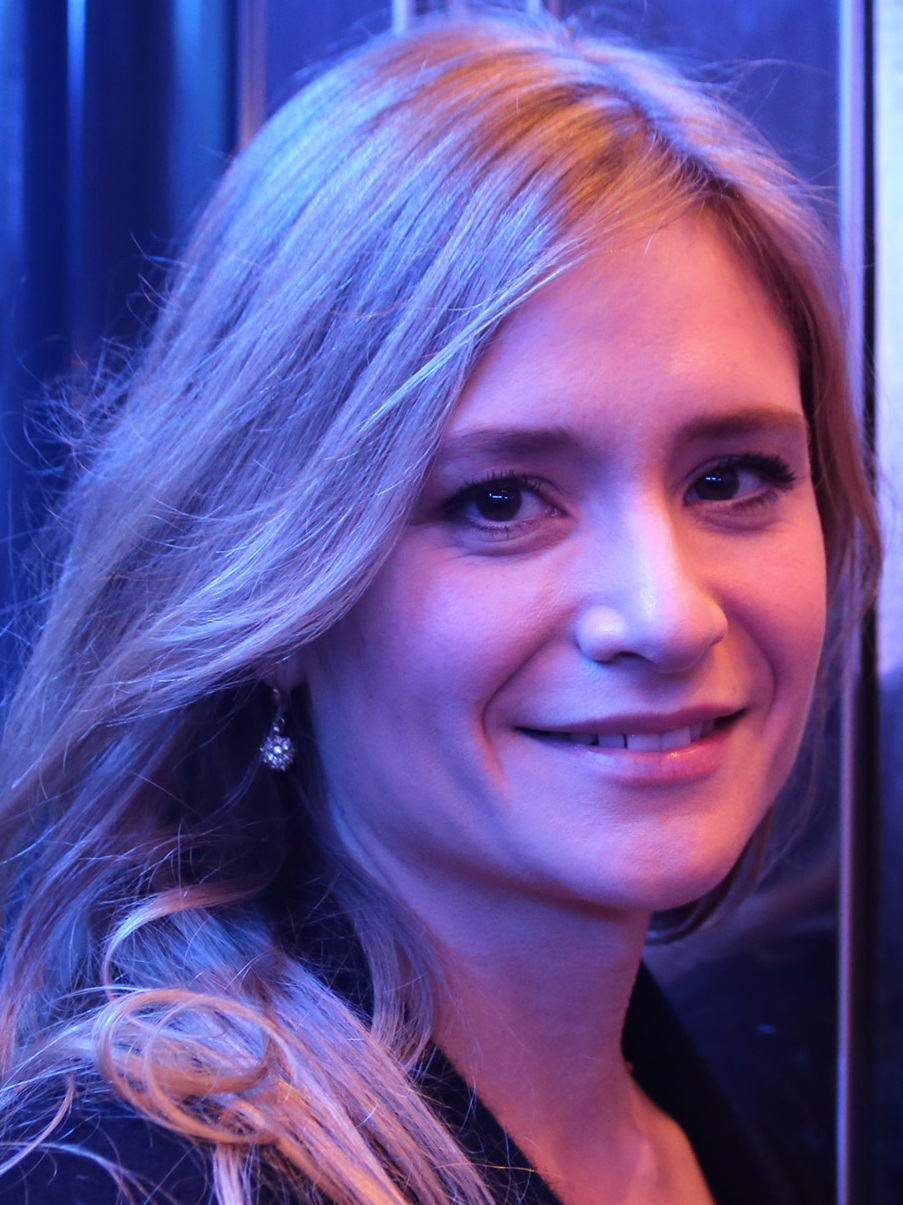
Julia Jentsch won for her role in Sophie Scholl – Die Letzten Tage (2005).

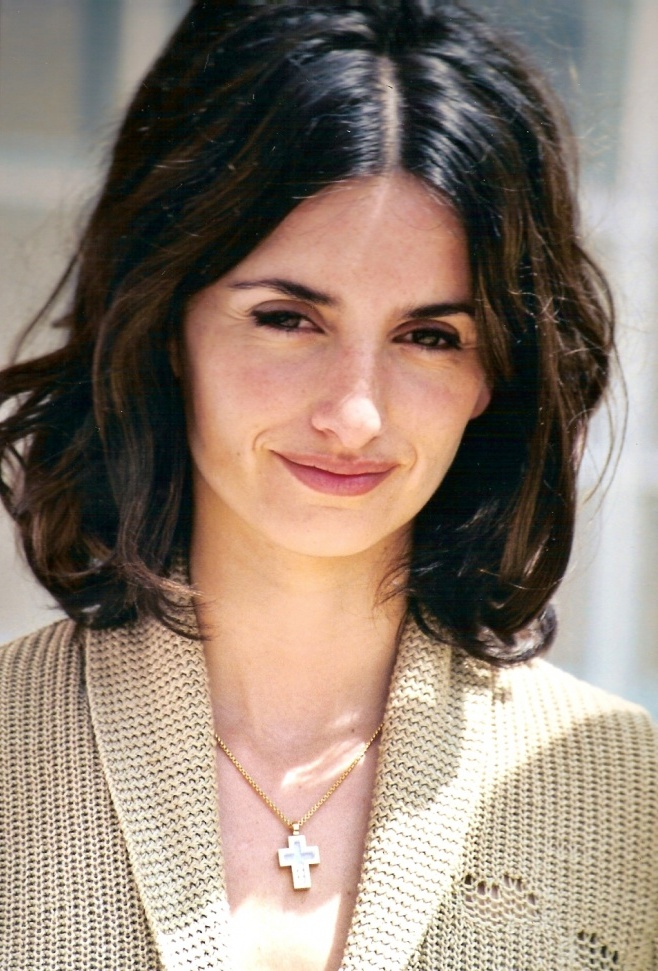
Penélope Cruz won for her role in Volver (2006)

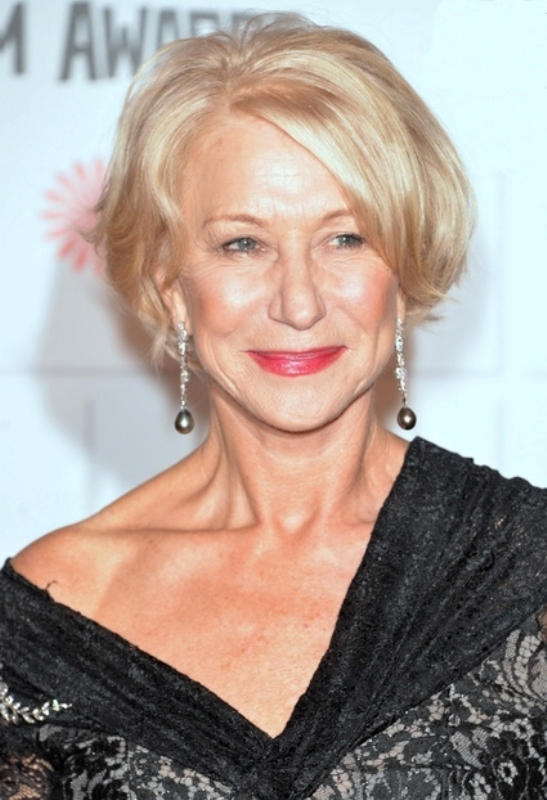
Helen Mirren won for her portrayal of Queen Elizabeth II in The Queen (2006)

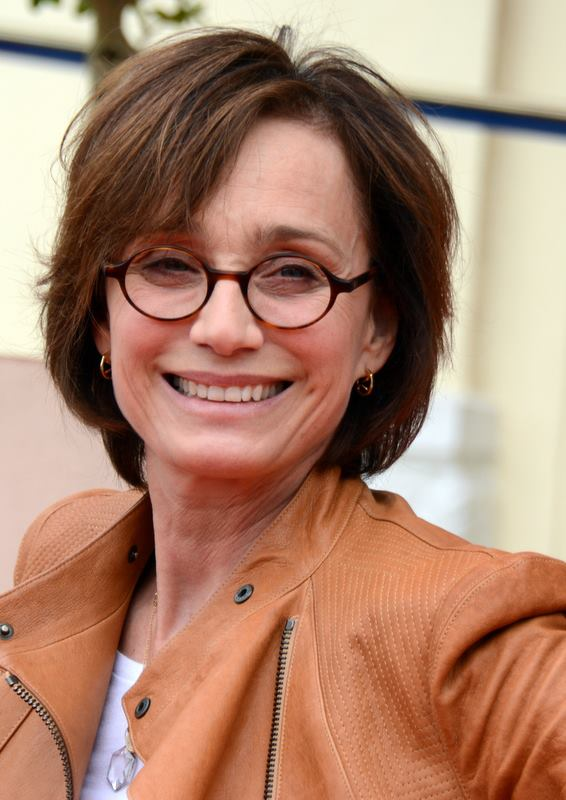
Kristin Scott Thomas won for her role in I've Loved You So Long (2008)

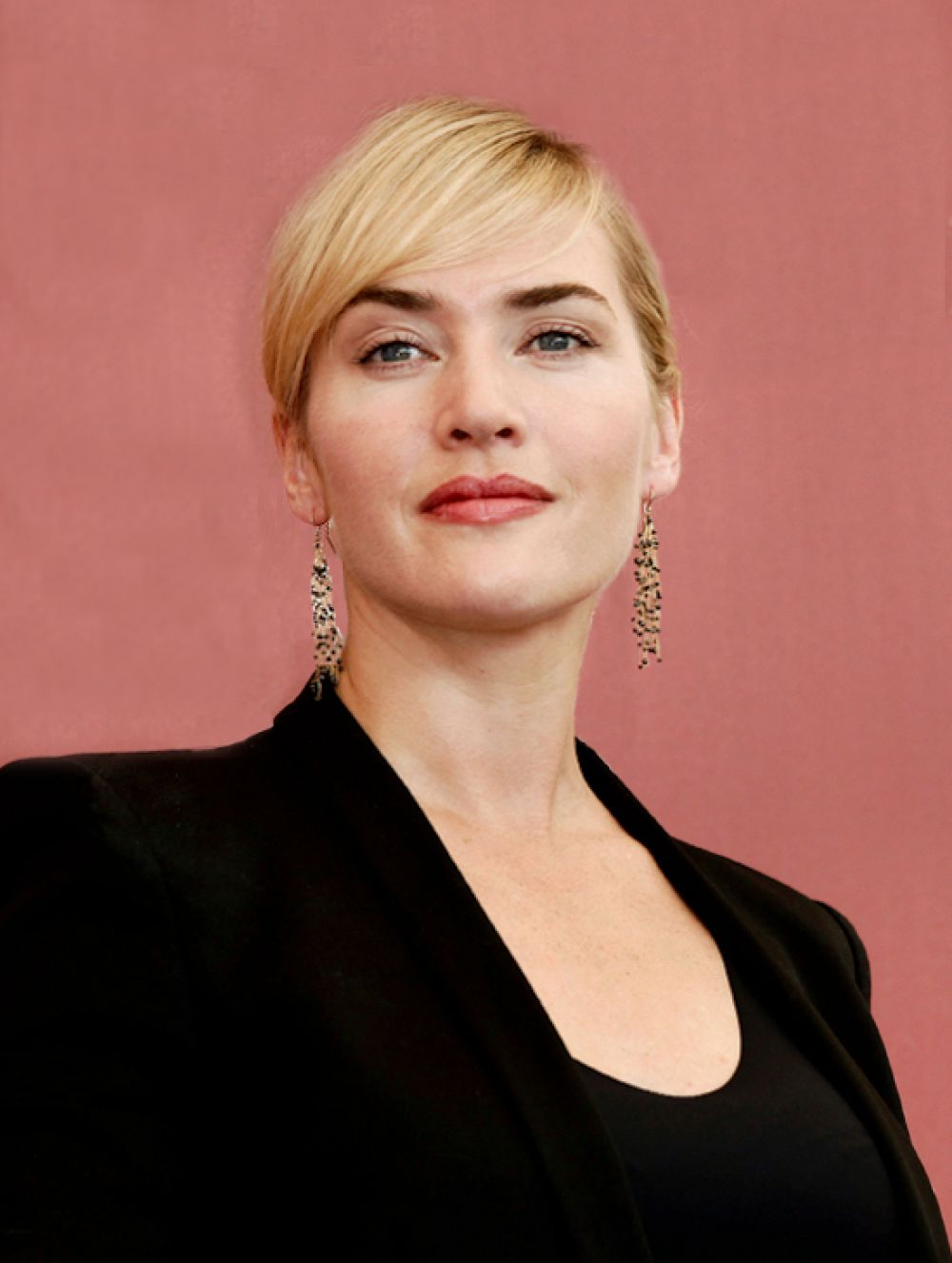
Kate Winslet won for her performance in The Reader (2008)

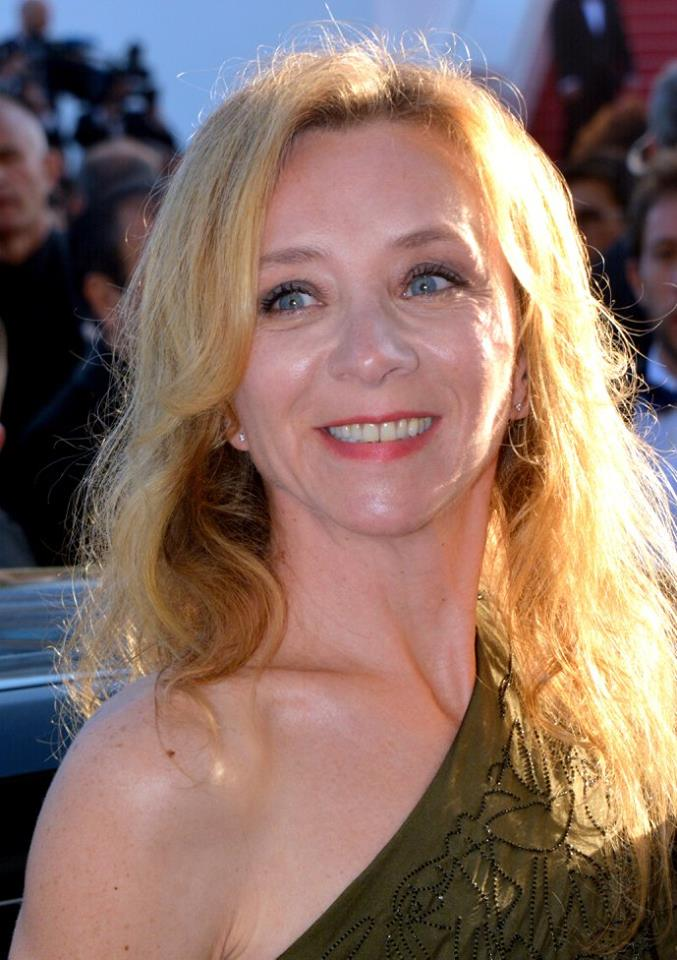
Sylvie Testud won for her role in Lourdes (2009).

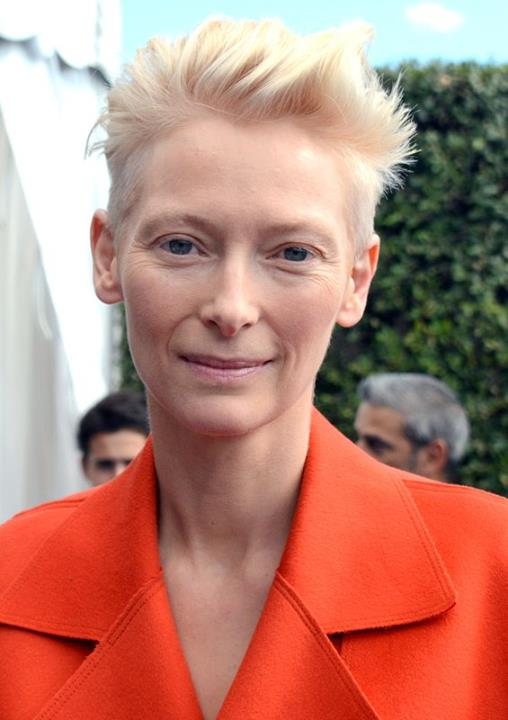
Tilda Swinton won for her role in We Need to Talk About Kevin (2011).

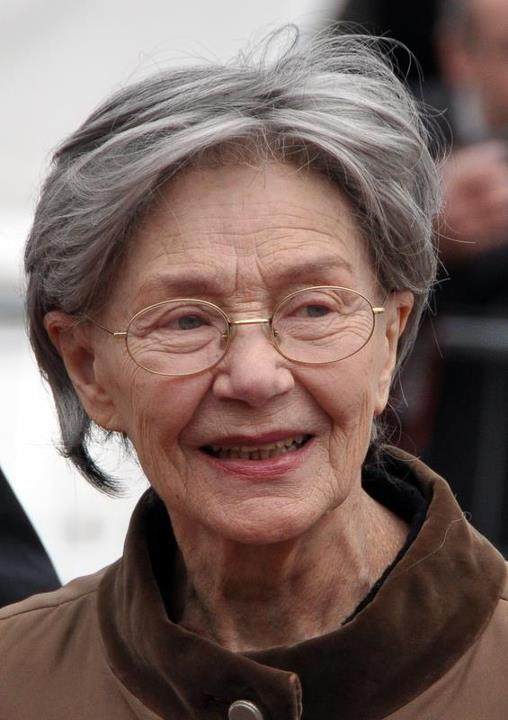
Emmanuelle Riva won for her role in Amour (2012)

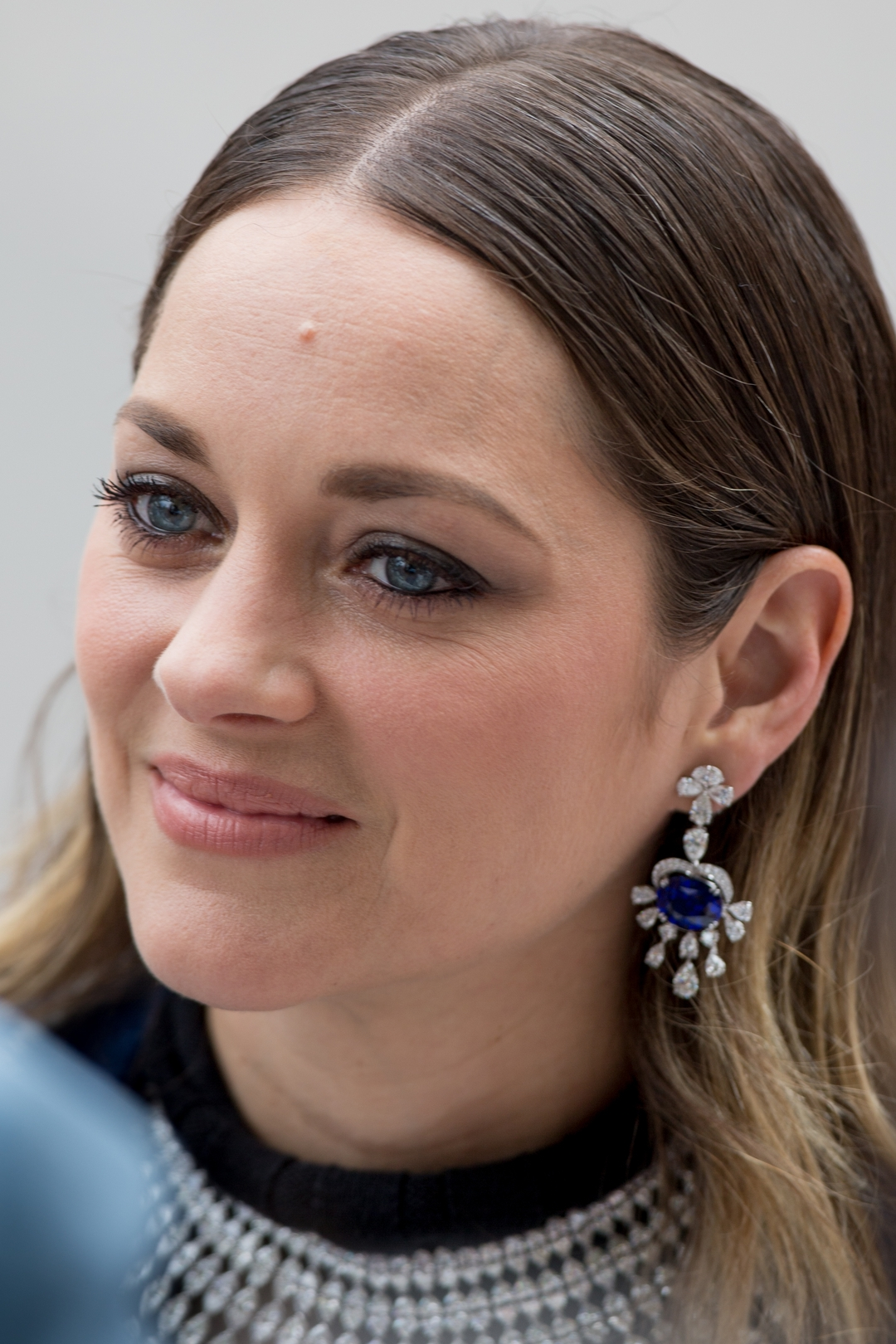
Marion Cotillard won for her role in Deux Jours, Une Nuit (2014)

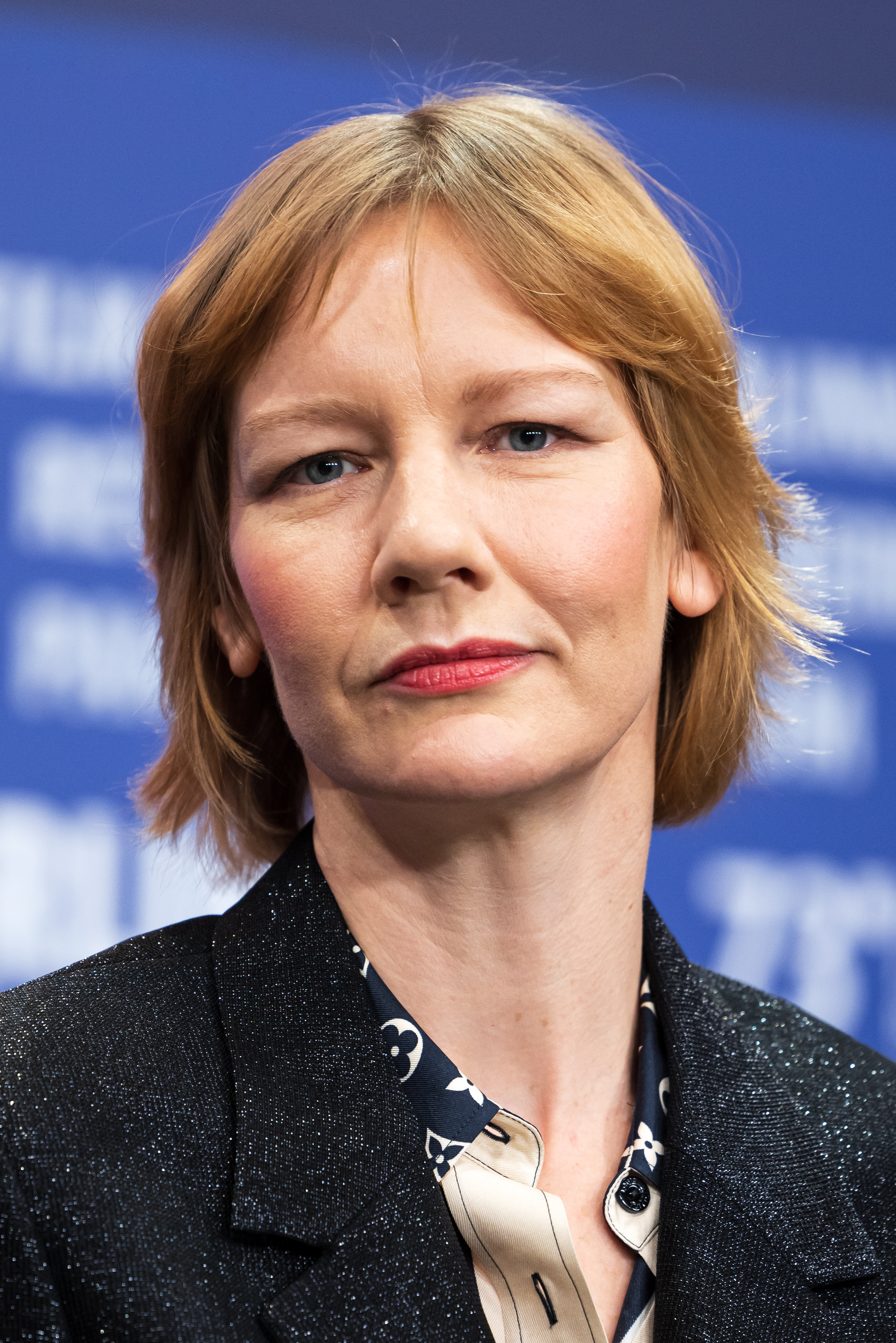
Sandra Hüller won twice for her roles in Toni Erdmann (2016) and Anatomy of a Fall (2023).

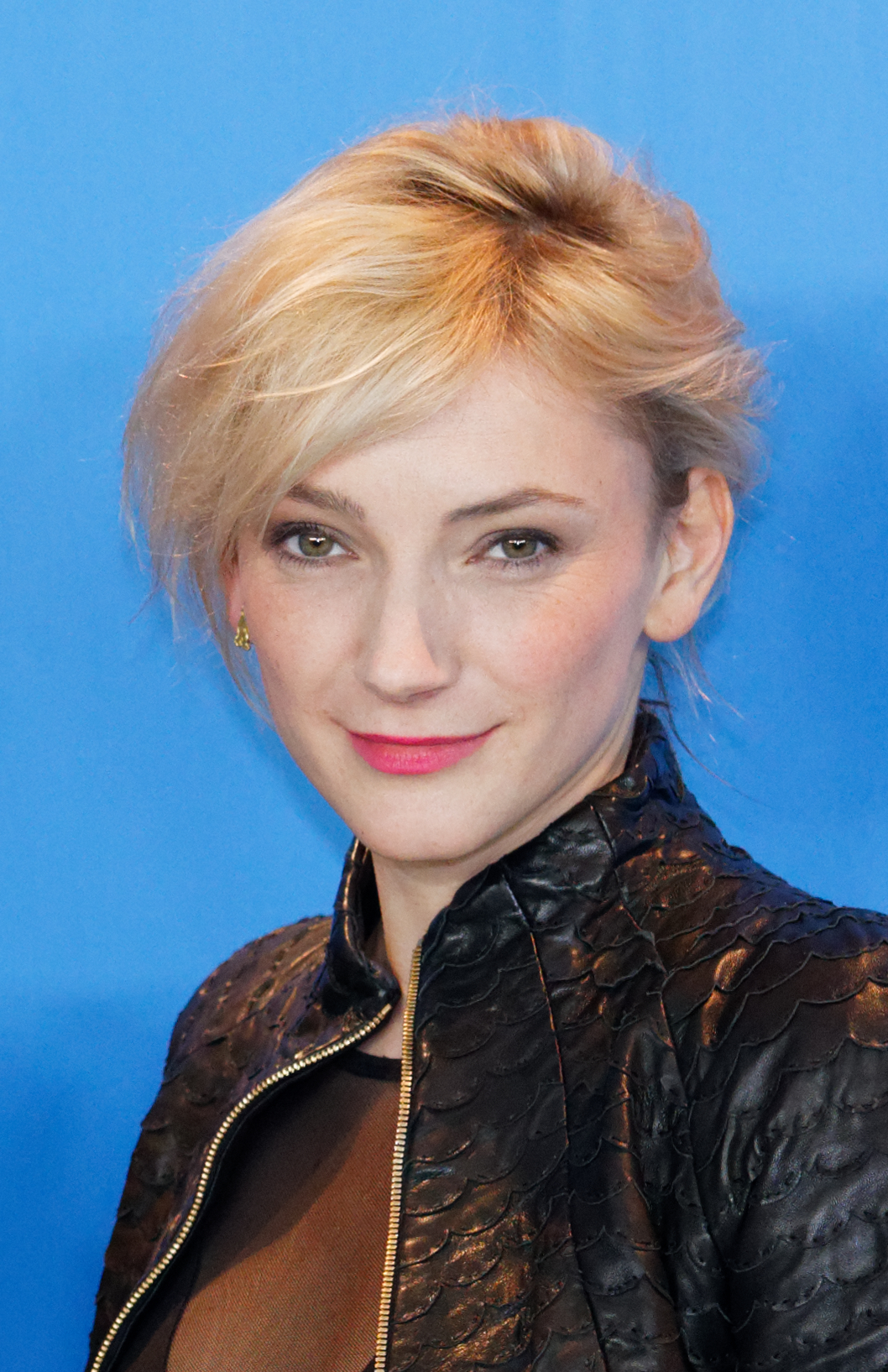
Alexandra Borbély won for her role in Testről és Lélekről (2017).

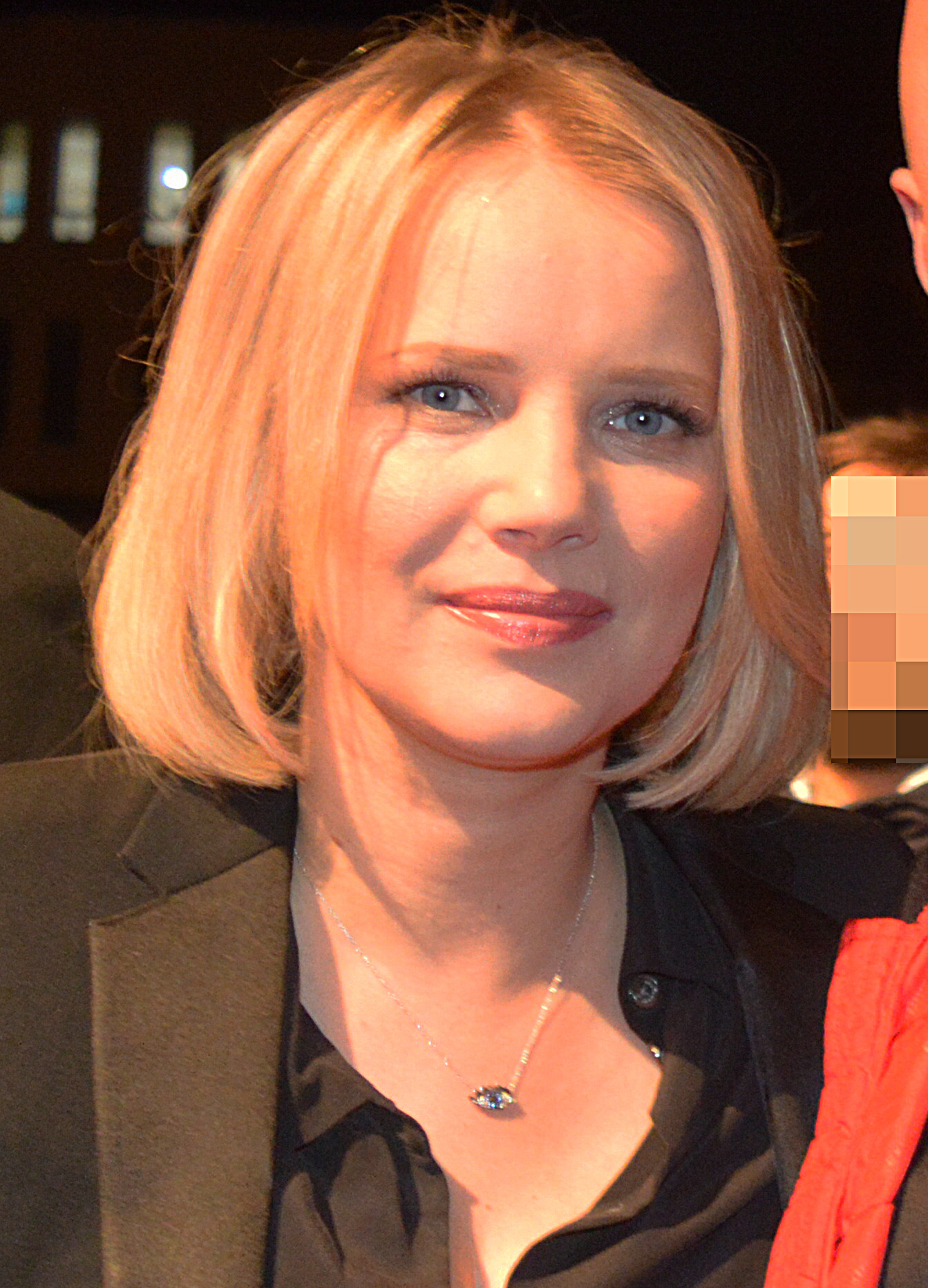
Joanna Kulig won for her role in Zimna wojna (2018).

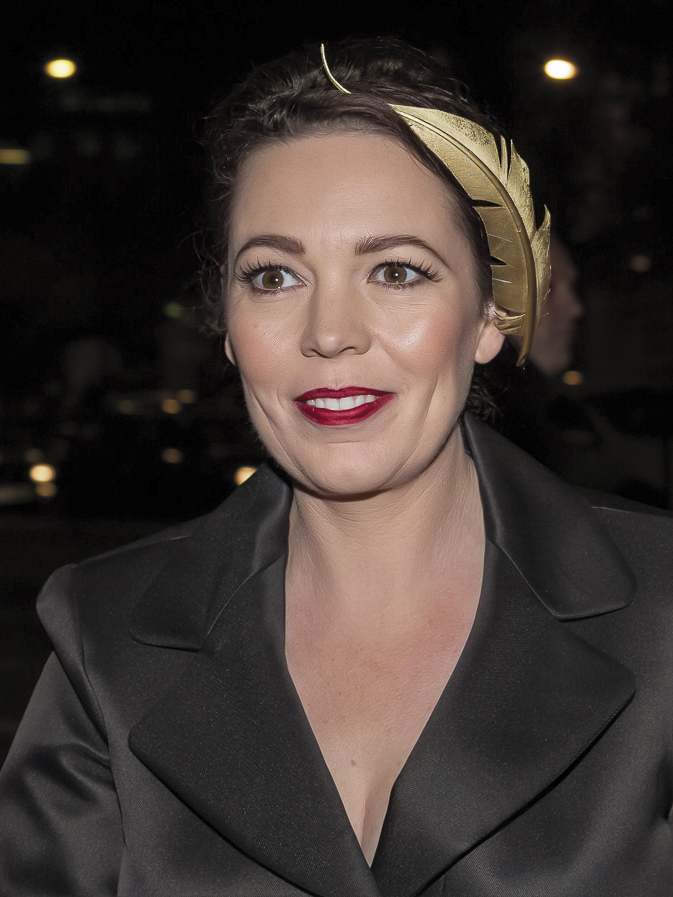
Olivia Colman won for her role in The Favourite (2018).

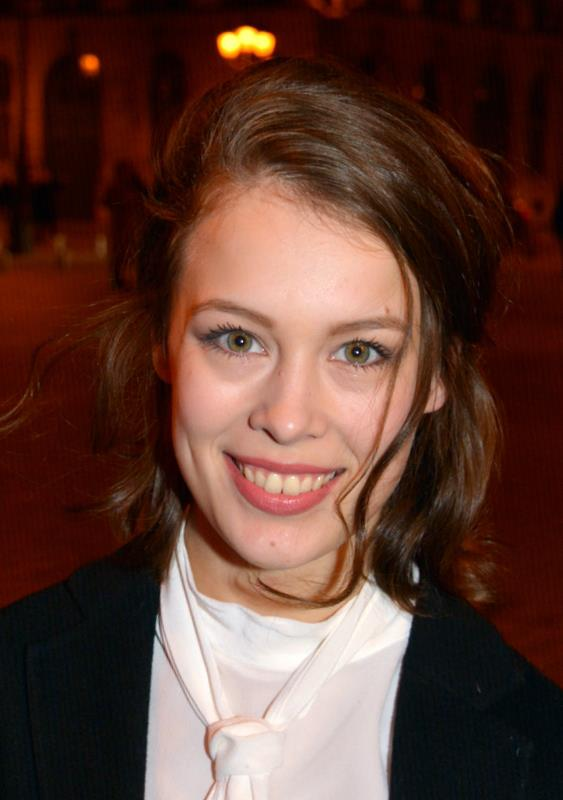
Paula Beer won for her role in Undine (2020).

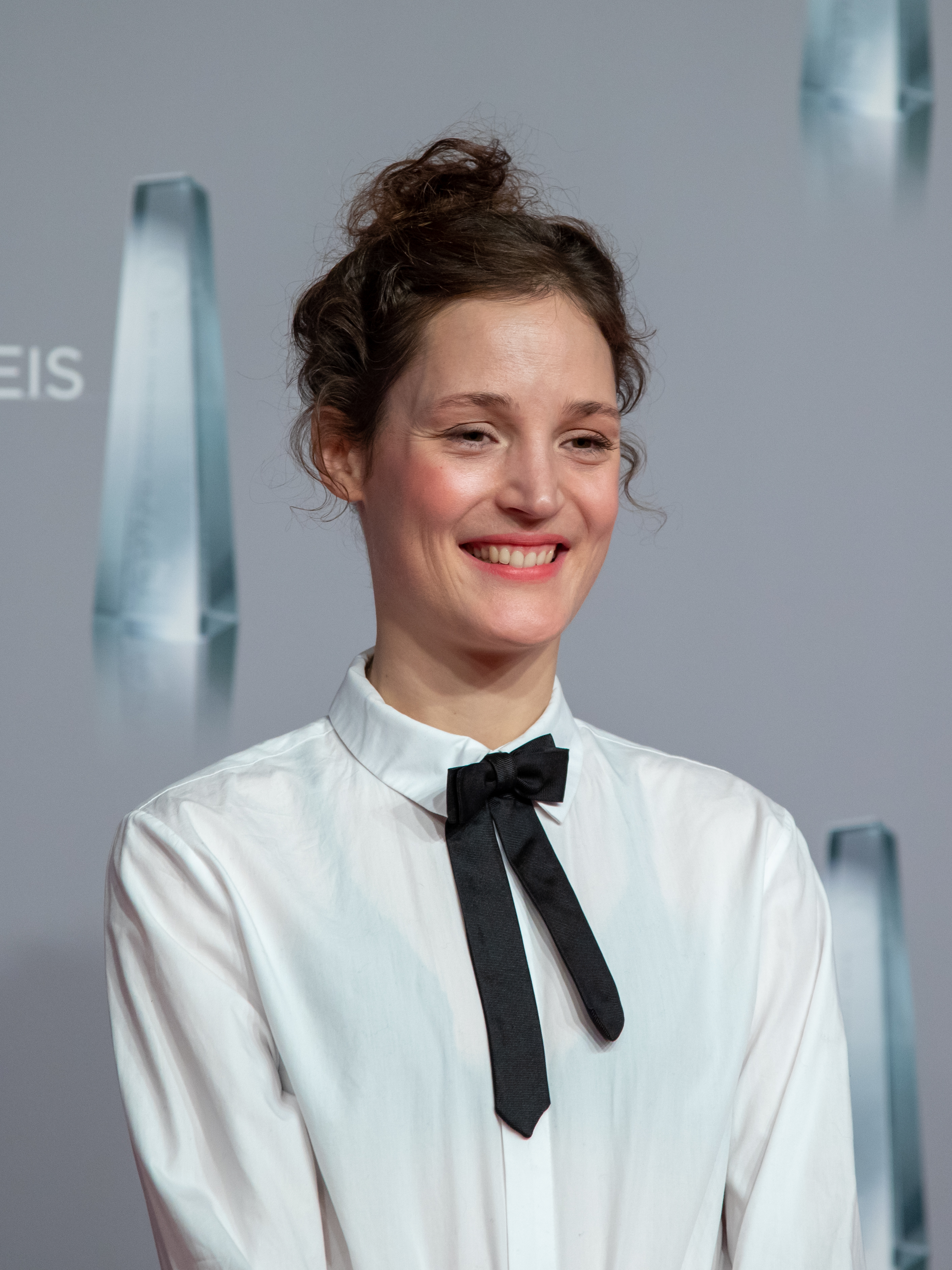
Vicky Krieps won for her role in Corsage (2022).

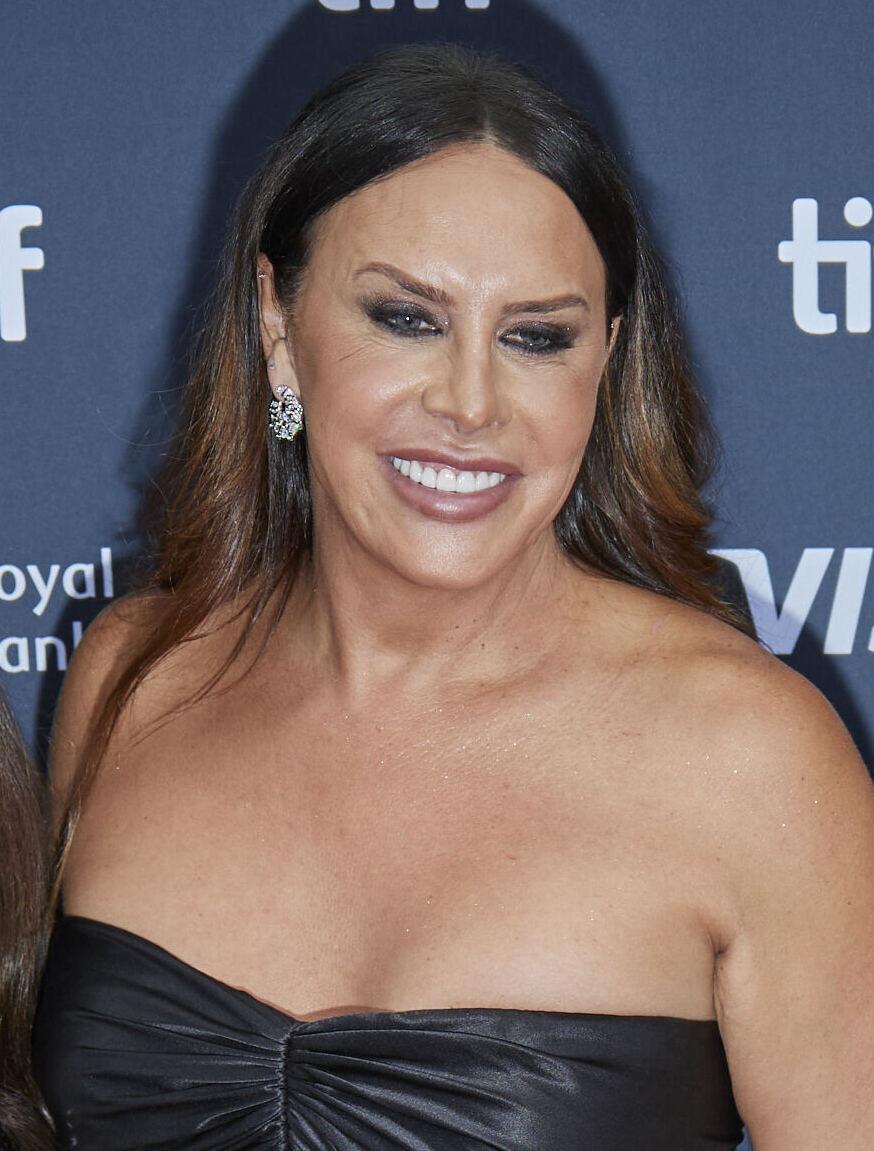
Karla Sofía Gascón won for her role in Emilia Pérez (2024).

=== 1980s ===
Year	Winner and nominees	English title	Original title	Character	Ref
1988 (1st)	Carmen Maura	Women on the Verge of a Nervous Breakdown	Mujeres al borde de un ataque de nervios	Pepa Marcos	
1988 (1st)	Tinna Gunnlaugsdóttir	In the Shadow of the Raven	Í skugga hrafnsins	Isold	
1988 (1st)	Ornella Muti	Private Access	Codice privato	Anna	
1988 (1st)	Carol Scanlan	Reefer and the Model		Teresa 'the Model'	
1989 (2nd)	Ruth Sheen	High Hopes		Shirley	
1989 (2nd)	Sabine Azéma	Life and Nothing But	La vie et rien d'autre	Irène de Courtil	
1989 (2nd)	Snežana Bogdanović	Kuduz		Badema Kuduz	
1989 (2nd)	Corinna Harfouch	Treffen in Travers		Therese Forster	
1989 (2nd)	Natalya Negoda	Little Vera	Ма́ленькая Ве́ра	Vera	

=== 1990s ===
Year	Winner and nominees	English title	Original title	Character	Ref
1990 (3rd)	Carmen Maura	¡Ay Carmela!		Carmela	
1990 (3rd)	Anne Brochet	Cyrano de Bergerac		Roxane	
1990 (3rd)	Krystyna Janda	Interrogation	Przesłuchanie	Antonina 'Tonia' Dziwisz	
1991 (4th)	Clotilde Courau	The Little Gangster	Le petit criminel	Nathalie	
1991 (4th)	Julie Delpy	Voyager	Homo Faber	Sabeth	
1991 (4th)	Sigríður Hagalín	Children of Nature	Börn náttúrunnar	Stella	
1992 (5th)	Juliette Binoche	The Lovers on the Bridge	Les amants du Pont-Neuf	Michèle	
1992 (5th)	Johanna ter Steege	Dear Emma, Sweet Böbe	Édes Emma, drága Böbe	Emma	
1992 (5th)	Barbara Sukowa	Europa		Katharina Hartmann	
1993 (6th)	Maia Morgenstern	The Oak	Balanta	Nela	
1993 (6th)	Carla Gravina	The Long Silence	Il lungo silenzio	Carla Aldrovandi	
1993 (6th)	Tilda Swinton	Orlando		Orlando	
1996 (9th)	Emily Watson	Breaking the Waves		Bess McNeill	
1997 (10th)	Juliette Binoche	The English Patient		Hana	
1997 (10th)	Katrin Cartlidge	Career Girls		Hannah Mills	
1997 (10th)	Brigitte Roüan	Post Coitum	Post coïtum animal triste	Diane Clovier	
1997 (10th)	Emma Thompson	The Winter Guest		Frances	
1998 (11th)	Elodie Bouchez; Natacha Régnier	The Dreamlife of Angels	La vie rêvée des anges	Isabelle 'Isa' Tostin; Marie Thomas	
1998 (11th)	Dinara Drukarova	Of Freaks and Men	Про уродов и людей	Liza	
1998 (11th)	Annet Malherbe	Little Tony	Kleine Teun	Keet	
1999 (12th)	Cecilia Roth	All About My Mother	Todo sobre mi madre	Manuela Echevarria	
1999 (12th)	Nathalie Baye	A Pornographic Affair	Une liaison pornographique	Her	
1999 (12th)	Penélope Cruz	The Girl of Your Dreams	La niña de tus ojos	Macarena Granada	
1999 (12th)	Emilie Dequenne	Rosetta		Rosetta	
1999 (12th)	Iben Hjejle	Mifune's Last Song	Mifune	Liva	

=== 2000s ===
Year	Winner and nominees	English title	Original title	Character	Ref
2000 (13th)	Björk	Dancer in the Dark		Selma Ježková	
2000 (13th)	Bibiana Beglau	The Legend of Rita	Die Stille nach dem Schuß	Rita Vogt	
2000 (13th)	Lena Endre	Faithless	Trolösa	Marianne	
2000 (13th)	Sylvie Testud	La Captive		Ariane	
2000 (13th)	Julie Walters	Billy Elliot		Sandra Wilkinson	
2001 (14th)	Isabelle Huppert	The Piano Teacher	La pianiste	Erika Kohut	
2001 (14th)	Ariane Ascaride	The Town Is Quiet	La ville est tranquille	Michèle	
2001 (14th)	Laura Morante	The Son's Room	La stanza del figlio	Paola	
2001 (14th)	Charlotte Rampling	Under the Sand	Sous le sable	Marie Drillon	
2001 (14th)	Stefania Sandrelli	The Last Kiss	L'ultimo bacio	Anna	
2001 (14th)	Audrey Tautou	Amélie	Le fabuleux destin d'Amélie Poulain	Amélie Poulain	
2002 (15th)	Catherine Deneuve; Isabelle Huppert; Emmanuelle Béart; Fanny Ardant; Virginie Ledoyen; Danielle Darrieux; Ludivine Sagnier; Firmine Richard	8 Women	8 femmes	Gaby; Augustine; Louise; Pierrette; Suzon; Mamy; Catherine; Madame Chanel	
2002 (15th)	Oksana Akinshina	Lilja 4-Ever		Lilya Michailova	
2002 (15th)	Emmanuelle Devos	Read My Lips	Sur mes lèvres	Carla Behm	
2002 (15th)	Martina Gedeck	Mostly Martha	Bella Martha	Martha Klein	
2002 (15th)	Laura Morante	A Journey Called Love	Un viaggio chiamato amore	Sibilla Aleramo	
2002 (15th)	Samantha Morton	Morvern Callar		Morvern Callar	
2002 (15th)	Kati Outinen	The Man Without a Past	Mies vailla menneisyyttä	Irma	
2003 (16th)	Charlotte Rampling	Swimming Pool		Sarah Morton	
2003 (16th)	Diana Dumbrava	Maria		Maria	
2003 (16th)	Helen Mirren	Calendar Girls		Chris Harper	
2003 (16th)	Anne Reid	The Mother		May	
2003 (16th)	Katja Riemann	Rosenstrasse		Lena Fischer	
2003 (16th)	Katrin Sass	Good Bye, Lenin!		Christiane Kerner	
2004 (17th)	Imelda Staunton	Vera Drake		Vera Drake	
2004 (17th)	Sarah Adler	Notre musique		Judith Lerner	
2004 (17th)	Valeria Bruni Tedeschi	5x2		Marion	
2004 (17th)	Penélope Cruz	Don't Move	Non ti muovere	Italia	
2004 (17th)	Sibel Kekilli	Head-On	Gegen die Wand	Sibel Güner	
2004 (17th)	Asi Levi	Stones	אבנים	Michale	
2005 (18th)	Julia Jentsch	Sophie Scholl - The Final Days	Sophie Scholl – Die letzten Tage	Sophia Magdalena 'Sophie' Scholl	
2005 (18th)	Juliette Binoche	Caché		Anne Laurent	
2005 (18th)	Sandra Ceccarelli	The Life I Want	La vita che vorrei	Laura / Eleonora	
2005 (18th)	Natalie Press	My Summer of Love		Mona	
2005 (18th)	Connie Nielsen	Brothers	Brødre	Sarah	
2005 (18th)	Judi Dench; Maggie Smith	Ladies in Lavender		Ursula Widdington; Janet Widdington	
2005 (18th)	Audrey Tautou	A Very Long Engagement	Un long dimanche de fiançailles	Mathilde Donnay	
2006 (19th)	Penélope Cruz	Volver		Raimunda	
2006 (19th)	Nathalie Baye	The Young Lieutenant	Le petit lieutenant	Caroline Vaudieu	
2006 (19th)	Martina Gedeck	The Lives Of Others	Das Leben der Anderen	Christa-Maria Sieland	
2006 (19th)	Sandra Hüller	Requiem		Michaela Klingler	
2006 (19th)	Mirjana Karanović	Grbavica		Esma Halilović	
2006 (19th)	Sarah Polley	The Secret Life of Words		Hanna	
2007 (20th)	Helen Mirren	The Queen		Queen Elizabeth II	
2007 (20th)	Marion Cotillard	La Vie en Rose	La môme	Édith Piaf	
2007 (20th)	Marianne Faithfull	Irina Palm		Maggie	
2007 (20th)	Carice van Houten	Black Book	Zwartboek	Rachel Stein	
2007 (20th)	Anamaria Marinca	4 Months, 3 Weeks and 2 Days	4 luni, 3 saptamani si 2 zile	Otilia Mihartescu	
2007 (20th)	Kseniya Rappoport	The Unknown Woman	La sconosciuta	Irena	
2008 (21st)	Kristin Scott Thomas	I've Loved You So Long	Il y a longtemps que je t'aime	Juliette Fontaine	
2008 (21st)	Hiam Abbass	Lemon Tree	Etz Limon	Salma Zidane	
2008 (21st)	Arta Dobroshi	Lorna's Silence	Le silence de Lorna	Lorna	
2008 (21st)	Sally Hawkins	Happy-Go-Lucky		Pauline "Poppy" Cross	
2008 (21st)	Belén Rueda	The Orphanage	El orfanato	Laura	
2008 (21st)	Ursula Werner	Cloud Nine	Wolke Neun	Inge	
2009 (22nd)	Kate Winslet	The Reader		Hanna Schmitz	
2009 (22nd)	Penélope Cruz	Broken Embraces	Los abrazos rotos	Magdalena "Lena" Rivas	
2009 (22nd)	Charlotte Gainsbourg	Antichrist		She	
2009 (22nd)	Katie Jarvis	Fish Tank		Mia Williams	
2009 (22nd)	Yolande Moreau	Séraphine		Séraphine Louis	
2009 (22nd)	Noomi Rapace	The Girl with the Dragon Tattoo	Män som hatar kvinnor	Lisbeth Salander	

=== 2010s ===
Year	Winner and nominees	English title	Original title	Character	Ref
2010 (23rd)	Sylvie Testud	Lourdes		Christine	
2010 (23rd)	Zrinka Cvitešić	On the Path	Na putu	Luna	
2010 (23rd)	Sibel Kekilli	When We Leave	Die Fremde	Umay	
2010 (23rd)	Lesley Manville	Another Year		Mary Smith	
2010 (23rd)	Lotte Verbeek	Nothing Personal		Annie	
2011 (24th)	Tilda Swinton	We Need to Talk About Kevin		Eva Khatchadourian	
2011 (24th)	Cécile de France	The Kid with a Bike	Le gamin au vélo	Samantha	
2011 (24th)	Kirsten Dunst	Melancholia		Justine	
2011 (24th)	Charlotte Gainsbourg	Melancholia		Claire	
2011 (24th)	Nadezhda Markina	Elena	Елена	Elena	
2012 (25th)	Emmanuelle Riva	Amour		Anne Laurent	
2012 (25th)	Émilie Dequenne	Our Children	À perdre la raison	Murielle	
2012 (25th)	Nina Hoss	Barbara		Barbara Wolff	
2012 (25th)	Margarethe Tiesel	Paradise: Love	Paradies: Liebe	Teresa	
2012 (25th)	Kate Winslet	Carnage		Nancy Cowan	
2013 (26th)	Veerle Baetens	The Broken Circle Breakdown		Elise Vandevelde / Alabama	
2013 (26th)	Luminița Gheorghiu	Child's Pose	Poziția copilului	Cornelia Keneres	
2013 (26th)	Keira Knightley	Anna Karenina		Anna Arkadievna Karenina	
2013 (26th)	Barbara Sukowa	Hannah Arendt		Hannah Arendt	
2013 (26th)	Naomi Watts	The Impossible	Lo Imposible	María	
2014 (27th)	Marion Cotillard	Two Days, One Night	Deux jours, une nuit	Sandra Bya	
2014 (27th)	Marian Álvarez	Wounded	La herida	Ana	
2014 (27th)	Charlotte Gainsbourg	Nymphomaniac		Joe	
2014 (27th)	Valeria Bruni Tedeschi	Human Capital	Il capitale umano	Carla Bernaschi	
2014 (27th)	Agata Kulesza	Ida		Wanda Gruz	
2014 (27th)	Agata Trzebuchowska	Ida		Anna / Ida Lebenstein	
2015 (28th)	Charlotte Rampling	45 Years		Kate Mercer	
2015 (28th)	Margherita Buy	Mia Madre		Margherita	
2015 (28th)	Laia Costa	Victoria		Victoria	
2015 (28th)	Alicia Vikander	Ex Machina		Ava	
2015 (28th)	Rachel Weisz	Youth		Lena Ballinger	
2016 (29th)	Sandra Hüller	Toni Erdmann		Ines Conradi	
2016 (29th)	Valeria Bruni Tedeschi	Like Crazy	La pazza gioia	Beatrice Morandini Valdirana	
2016 (29th)	Trine Dyrholm	The Commune	Kollektivet	Anna	
2016 (29th)	Isabelle Huppert	Elle		Michèle Leblanc	
2016 (29th)	Emma Suárez; Adriana Ugarte	Julieta		Julieta Arcos; Younger Julieta Arcos	
2017 (30th)	Alexandra Borbély	On Body and Soul	Testről és lélekről	Mária	
2017 (30th)	Juliette Binoche	Let the Sunshine In	Un beau soleil intérieur	Isabelle	
2017 (30th)	Paula Beer	Frantz		Anna	
2017 (30th)	Isabelle Huppert	Happy End		Anne Laurent	
2017 (30th)	Florence Pugh	Lady Macbeth		Katherine Lester	
2018 (31st)	Joanna Kulig	Cold War	Zimna wojna	Zuzanna "Zula" Lichoń	
2018 (31st)	Marie Bäumer	3 Days in Quiberon	3 Tage in Quiberon	Romy Schneider	
2018 (31st)	Halldóra Geirharðsdóttir	Woman at War	Kona fer í stríð	Halla	
2018 (31st)	Bárbara Lennie	Petra		Petra	
2018 (31st)	Eva Melander	Border	Gräns	Tina	
2018 (31st)	Alba Rohrwacher	Happy as Lazzaro	Lazzaro felice	Antonia	
2019 (32nd)	Olivia Colman	The Favourite		Queen Anne	
2019 (32nd)	Trine Dyrholm	Queen of Hearts	Dronningen	Anne	
2019 (32nd)	Adèle Haenel; Noémie Merlant	Portrait of a Lady on Fire	Portrait de la jeune fille en feu	Héloïse; Marianne	
2019 (32nd)	Viktoria Miroshnichenko	Beanpole	Дылда	Beanpole	
2019 (32nd)	Helena Zengel	System Crasher	Systemsprenger	Bernadette	

=== 2020s ===
Year	Winner and nominees	English title	Original title	Character	Ref
2020 (33rd)	Paula Beer	Undine		Undine Wibeau	
2020 (33rd)	Natasha Berezhnaya	DAU. Natasha	ДАУ. Наташа	Natasha	
2020 (33rd)	Andrea Bræin Hovig	Hope	Håp	Anja	
2020 (33rd)	Nina Hoss	My Little Sister	Schwesterlein	Lisa	
2020 (33rd)	Marta Nieto	Mother	Madre	Elena	
2020 (33rd)	Ane Dahl Torp	Charter		Alice	
2021 (34th)	Jasna Đuričić	Quo Vadis, Aida?		Aida Selmanagić	
2021 (34th)	Seidi Haarla	Compartment No. 6	Hytti nro 6	Laura	
2021 (34th)	Carey Mulligan	Promising Young Woman		Cassandra "Cassie" Thomas	
2021 (34th)	Renate Reinsve	The Worst Person in the World	Verdens verste menneske	Julie	
2021 (34th)	Agathe Rousselle	Titane		Alexia / Adrien	
2022 (35th)	Vicky Krieps	Corsage		Empress Elisabeth of Austria	
2022 (35th)	Penélope Cruz	Parallel Mothers	Madres Paralelas	Janis Martínez	
2022 (35th)	Zar Amir Ebrahimi	Holy Spider	عنکبوت مقدس	Arezoo Rahimi	
2022 (35th)	Meltem Kaptan	Rabiye Kurnaz vs. George W. Bush	Rabiye Kurnaz gegen George W. Bush	Rabiye Kurnaz	
2022 (35th)	Léa Seydoux	One Fine Morning	Un Beau Matin	Sandra	
2023 (36th)	Sandra Hüller	Anatomy of a Fall	Anatomie d'une chute	Sandra Voyter	
2023 (36th)	Eka Chavleishvili	Blackbird Blackbird Blackberry		Etero	
2023 (36th)	Alma Pöysti	Fallen Leaves	Kuolleet lehdet	Ansa	
2023 (36th)	Mia McKenna-Bruce	How to Have Sex		Tara	
2023 (36th)	Leonie Benesch	The Teachers' Lounge	Das Lehrerzimmer	Carla Nowak	
2023 (36th)	Sandra Hüller	The Zone of Interest		Hedwig Höss	
2024 (37th)	Karla Sofía Gascón	Emilia Pérez		Emilia Pérez / Juan "Manitas" Del Monte	
2024 (37th)	Renate Reinsve	Armand		Elisabeth	
2024 (37th)	Trine Dyrholm	The Girl with the Needle	Pigen med nålen	Dagmar Overbye	
2024 (37th)	Vic Carmen Sonne	The Girl with the Needle	Pigen med nålen	Karoline	
2024 (37th)	Tilda Swinton	The Room Next Door	La habitación de al lado	Martha / Michelle	
2025 (38th)	Renate Reinsve	Sentimental Value	Affeksjonsverdi	Nora Borg	
2025 (38th)	Leonie Benesch	Late Shift	Heldin	Floria	
2025 (38th)	Valeria Bruni Tedeschi	Duse		Eleonora Duse	
2025 (38th)	Léa Drucker	Case 137	Dossier 137	Stéphanie Bertrand	
2025 (38th)	Vicky Krieps	Love Me Tender		Clémence	
2025 (39th)	Mathilde Arcel	Woman Unknown	Kvinde ukendt	Marie	
2025 (39th)	Penélope Cruz	Bunker		Sofia	
2025 (39th)	Sandra Hüller	Fatherland		Erika Mann	
2025 (39th)	Sandra Hüller	Rose		Rose	
2025 (39th)	Renate Reinsve	Fjord		Lisbet Gheorghiu	
2025 (39th)	Léa Seydoux	Gentle Monster		Lucy Weiss	

== Multiple wins and nominations ==
=== Multiple wins ===
Wins	Actress
2	Juliette Binoche
2	Sandra Hüller
2	Isabelle Huppert
2	Carmen Maura
2	Charlotte Rampling

=== Multiple nominations ===
Nominations	Actress
6	Penélope Cruz
6	Sandra Hüller
4	Juliette Binoche
4	Valeria Bruni Tedeschi
4	Isabelle Huppert
4	Renate Reinsve
3	Trine Dyrholm
3	Charlotte Gainsbourg
3	Charlotte Rampling
3	Tilda Swinton
2	Nathalie Baye
2	Paula Beer
2	Leonie Benesch
2	Marion Cotillard
2	Émilie Dequenne
2	Martina Gedeck
2	Nina Hoss
2	Sibel Kekilli
2	Vicky Krieps
2	Carmen Maura
2	Helen Mirren
2	Laura Morante
2	Léa Seydoux
2	Barbara Sukowa
2	Audrey Tautou
2	Sylvie Testud
2	Kate Winslet

== Superlatives ==
=== Age superlatives ===
Record	Actress	Film	Age (in years)
Oldest winner	Emmanuelle Riva	Amour	85
Oldest nominee	Emmanuelle Riva	Amour	85
Youngest winner	Clotilde Courau	The Little Gangster	22
Youngest nominee	Helena Zengel	System Crasher	11

=== Multiple nominations from the same film ===
Year	Actress	Film
1998	Elodie Bouchez and Natacha Regnier	The Dreamlife of Angels
2002	Fanny Ardant, Emmanuelle Béart, Danielle Darrieux, Catherine Deneuve, Isabelle Huppert, Virginie Ledoyen, Firmine Richard and Ludivine Sagnier	8 Women
2005	Judi Dench and Maggie Smith	Ladies in Lavender
2011	Kirsten Dunst and Charlotte Gainsbourg	Melancholia
2013	Agata Kulesza and Agata Trzebuchowska	Ida
2016	Emma Suárez and Adriana Ugarte	Julieta
2019	Adèle Haenel and Noémie Merlant	Portrait of a Lady on Fire
2024	Trine Dyrholm and Vic Carmen Sonne	The Girl with the Needle

== See also ==
- BAFTA Award for Best Actress in a Leading Role
- BIFA for Best Performance by an Actress in a British Independent Film
- César Award for Best Actress
- David di Donatello for Best Actress
- Goya Award for Best Actress
- Polish Academy Award for Best Actress
- Robert Award for Best Actress in a Leading Role
