= Tenki =

Tenki may refer to:

- Dalma Tenki (born 1991), Hungarian actress
- Réka Tenki (born 1986), Hungarian actress
- Tenki, Tatarstan, villare in Tatatrstan, Russia

== See also ==
- Tenke (disambiguation)
