= 30th European Film Awards =

2017 film awards ceremony in Germany

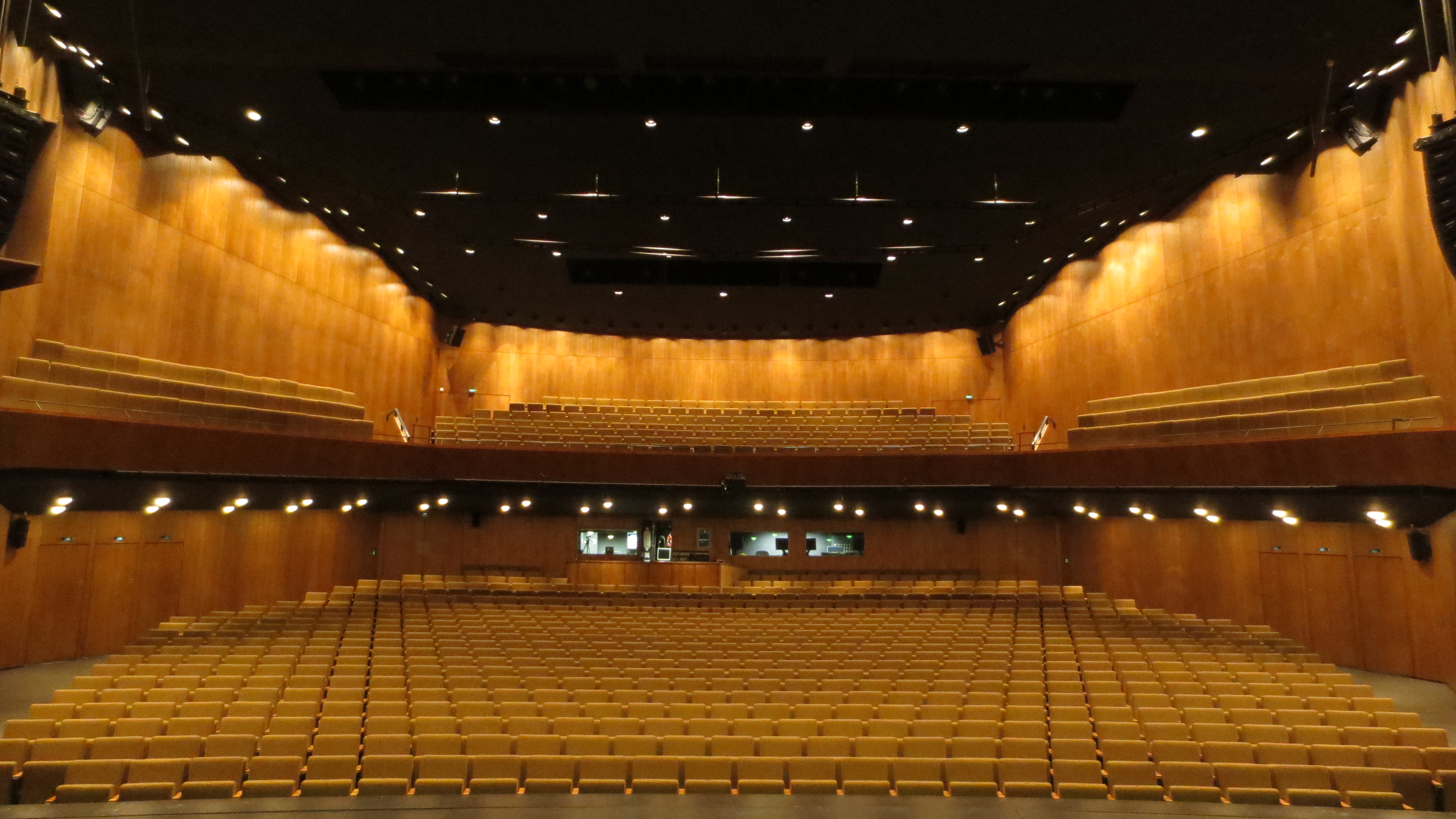
- Haus der Berliner Festspiele
- Date: 9 December 2017
- Site: Berlin, Germany
- Hosted by: Thomas Hermanns
- Organized by: European Film Academy

Highlights
- Best Picture: The Square
- Best Direction: Ruben Östlund; The Square
- Best Actor: Claes Bang; The Square
- Best Actress: Alexandra Borbély; On Body and Soul
- Most awards: The Square (5)
- Most nominations: The Square (5)

The 30th European Film Awards were presented on 9 December 2017 in Berlin, Germany. The nominations and winners are selected by more than 2,500 members of the European Film Academy.

== Selection ==
- A Ciambra
- A Date for Mad Mary
- A Gentle Creature
- A Jew Must Die
- A Monster Calls
- Afterimage
- Ana, mon amour
- Big Big World
- BPM (Beats per Minute)
- Bright Sunshine In
- Brimstone
- Fortunata
- Frantz
- Frost
- Godless
- Happy End
- Heartstone
- Home
- Ice Mother
- In Times of Fading Light
- Indivisible
- Insyriated
- Istanbul Red
- Jupiter's Moon
- Lady Macbeth
- Layla M.
- Loveless
- My Grandmother Fanny Kaplan
- On Body and Soul
- Paradise
- Requiem for Mrs. J.
- Return to Montauk
- Sami Blood
- Son of Sofia
- Spoor
- Stefan Zweig: Farewell to Europe
- Summer 1993
- The Constitution
- The Fury of a Patient Man
- The Killing of a Sacred Deer
- The King's Choice
- The Last Family
- The Nothing Factory
- The Other Side of Hope
- The Party
- The Square
- The Teacher
- Tom of Finland
- Western
- Wild Mouse
- You Disappear

== Awards voted by EFA Members ==
=== Best Film ===
The nominees were announced on 4 November 2017 in Seville, Spain at the Seville European Film Festival. Three films nominated for Best Film were premiered at the Cannes Film Festival, including the Palme d’Or winner The Square, and Grand Prix winner BPM (Beats per Minute). Four films (BPM (Beats per Minute), Loveless, On Body and Soul, The Square) had been submitted for Best Foreign Language Film at the 90th Academy Awards. Two films (Loveless, The Square) received nominations at the 19th British Independent Film Awards.

English title	Director(s)	Producer(s)	Production companies	Country	Language
The Square	Ruben Östlund	Erik Hemmendorff, Philippe Bober	Plattform Produktion, Film i Väst, Essential Films, Parisienne, Coproduction Office, Sveriges Television, Imperative Entertainment, Arte France Cinéma, ZDF	(Sweden) (France) (Germany) (Denmark)	Swedish, English, Danish
BPM (Beats per Minute)	Robin Campillo	Marie-Ange Luciani, Hugues Charbonneau	Les Films de Pierre, France 3 Cinéma, Page 114, Memento Films, FD Production, Centre National de la Cinématographie, Indéfilms 5, Cofinova 13, France Télévisions, Canal+, Ciné+	(France)	French
Loveless	Andrey Zvyagintsev	Alexander Rodnyansky, Sergey Melkumov, Gleb Fetisov	Arte France Cinéma, Fetisoff Illusion, Les Films du Fleuve, Non-Stop Production, Senator Film Produktion, Why Not Productions	(Russia) (Belgium) (Germany) (France)	Russian
On Body and Soul	Ildikó Enyedi	Ernő Mesterházy, András Muhi, Mónika Mécs	Inforg-M&M Film Kft.	(Hungary)	Hungarian
The Other Side of Hope	Aki Kaurismäki	Aki Kaurismäki	Sputnik, Oy Bufo Ab, ZDF	(Finland) (Germany)	Finnish, English, Arabic

=== Best Comedy ===
The nominees were announced on 4 November 2017.

English title	Director(s)	Producer(s)	Production companies	Country	Language
The Square	Ruben Östlund	Erik Hemmendorff, Philippe Bober	Plattform Produktion, Film i Väst, Essential Films, Parisienne, Coproduction Office, Sveriges Television, Imperative Entertainment, Arte France Cinéma, ZDF	(Sweden) (Germany) (France) (Denmark)	Swedish, English, Danish
King of the Belgians	Peter Brosens, Jessica Woodworth	Peter Brosens, Jessica Woodworth	Bo Films, Entre Chien et Loup, Topkapi Films, Art Fest	(Belgium) (Netherlands) (Bulgaria)	English, Flemish, French, Bulgarian
Vincent	Christophe van Rompaey	Dries Phlypo, Jean-Claude van Rijckeghem, Emmanuel Giraud, Aurélie Bordier	A Private View, Les Films de la Croisade	(Belgium) (France)	Dutch, French
Welcome to Germany	Simon Verhoeven	Quirin Berg, Max Wiedemann, Michael Verhoeven, Stefan Gärtner	Wiedemann & Berg, Filmproduktion GmbH & Co. KG, Sentana Film, Seven Pictures Film	(Germany)	German

=== Best Director ===
The nominees were announced on 4 November 2017

Director(s)	English title
(Sweden) Ruben Östlund	The Square
(Hungary) Ildikó Enyedi	On Body and Soul
(Finland) Aki Kaurismäki	The Other Side of Hope
(Greece) Yorgos Lanthimos	The Killing of a Sacred Deer
(Russia) Andrey Zvyagintsev	Loveless

=== Best Screenwriter ===
The nominees were announced on 4 November 2017

Screenwriter(s)	English title
(Sweden) Ruben Östlund	The Square
(Hungary) Ildikó Enyedi	On Body and Soul
(Greece) Yorgos Lanthimos, Efthymis Filippou	The Killing of a Sacred Deer
(Russia) Oleg Negin, Andrey Zvyagintsev	Loveless
(France) François Ozon	Frantz

=== Best Actress ===
The nominees were announced on 4 November 2017

Actress	English title	Role
(Slovakia) Alexandra Borbély	On Body and Soul	Mária
(Germany) Paula Beer	Frantz	Anna
(France) Juliette Binoche	Bright Sunshine In	Isabelle
(France) Isabelle Huppert	Happy End	Anne Laurent
(United Kingdom) Florence Pugh	Lady Macbeth	Katherine Lester

=== Best Actor ===
The nominees were announced on 4 November 2017.

Actor	English title	Role
(Denmark) Claes Bang	The Square	Christian
(Argentina) Nahuel Pérez Biscayart	BPM (Beats per Minute)	Sean Dalmazo
(Republic of Ireland) Colin Farrell	The Killing of a Sacred Deer	Steven Murphy
(Austria) Josef Hader	Stefan Zweig: Farewell to Europe	Stefan Zweig
(France) Jean-Louis Trintignant	Happy End	Georges Laurent

== Technical awards ==
A special seven-member jury convened in Berlin and decided on the winners in seven tech categories. The members of the jury are:

- Samir Fočo, sound designer, Bosnia & Herzegovina
- Raf Keunen, composer, Belgium
- Melanie Ann Oliver, editor, UK
- Vassilia Rozana, costume designer, Greece
- Susana Sanchez, hair & make-up artist, Spain
- Łukasz Żal, cinematographer, Poland
- Tonino Zera, production designer, Italy.

=== Best Composer ===
The winners were announced on 14 November 2017.

Winner(s)	English title
(Russia) Evgueni and Sacha Galperine	Loveless

=== Best Cinematographer ===
The winner was announced on 14 November 2017.

Winner(s)	English title
(Russia) Mikhail Krichman	Loveless

=== Best Editor ===
The winner was announced on 14 November 2017.

Winner(s)	English title
(France) Robin Campillo	BPM (Beats per Minute)

=== Best Production Designer ===
The winner was announced on 14 November 2017.

Winner(s)	English title
(Sweden) Josefin Åsberg	The Square

=== Best Costume Designer ===
The winners were announced on 14 November 2017.

English title	Winner(s)
(Poland) Katarzyna Lewińska	Spoor

=== Best Sound Designer ===
The winner was announced on 14 November 2017.

Winner(s)	English title
(Spain) Oriol Tarragó	A Monster Calls

=== Best Makeup and Hairstyling ===
The winner was announced on 14 November 2017.

Winner(s)	English title
(Netherlands) Leendert van Nimwegen	Brimstone

== Critics Award ==
=== European Discovery ===
The nominees were announced on 19 October 2017. Award given by International Federation of Film Critics - Prix FIPRESCI.

English title	Director(s)	Producer(s)	Production companies	Country	Language
Lady Macbeth	William Oldroyd	Fodhla Cronin O'Reilly	BBC Films, British Film Institute, Creative England, iFeatures, Protagonist Pictures, Sixty Six Pictures	(United Kingdom)	English
Bloody Milk	Hubert Charuel	Stéphanie Bermann, Alexis Dulguerian	Domino Films, France 2 Cinéma, Canal+, France Télévisions, Indéfilms 5, Pyramide	(France)	French
Godless	Ralitza Petrova	Rossitsa Valkanova, Eva Jakobsen, Laurence Clerc	KLAS Film, Snowglobe, Alcatraz Films, Film Factory, Aporia Filmworks	(Bulgaria) (Denmark) (France)	Bulgarian
Summer 1993	Carla Simón	Valérie Delpierre, Stefan Schmitz, María Zamora	Avalon, Fundación SGAE, Inicia Films, ICEC, ICAA, Media, Producciones Cinematográficas Cima, Sources 2, Televisión Española	(Spain)	Catalan
The Eremites	Ronny Trocker	Susanne Mann, Paul Zischler	Zischlermann Filmproduktion, Golden Girls Filmproduktion, EchoFilm, BLS Südtirol Alto Adige, Beauftragter der Bundesregierung für Angelegenheiten der Kultur und der Medien, Filmservices, Medienboard Berlin-Brandenburg, Servus TV, Österreichisches Filminstitut	(Germany) (Austria)	German

== Best Animated Feature Film ==
The nominees were announced on 24 October 2017. One film (Zombillenium) nominated for Best Animated Feature Film were premiered at the Cannes Film Festival.

English title	Director(s)	Animator(s)	Producer(s)	Production companies	Country	Language
Loving Vincent	Dorota Kobiela, Hugh Welchman	Dorota Kobiela, Lukasz Mackiewicz	Hugh Welchman, Ivan Mactaggart, Sean Bobbitt	BreakThru Productions, Trademark Films	(Poland) (United Kingdom)	English
Ethel & Ernest	Roger Mainwood	Peter Dodd	Camilla Deakin, Ruth Fielding, Stephan Roelants	BBC Films, British Film Institute, Ffilm Cymru Wales, Film Fund Luxembourg, Cloth Cat Animation, Ethel & Ernest Productions, Lupus Films, Mélusine Productions	(United Kingdom)	English
Louise by the Shore	Jean-François Laguionie	Lionel Chauvin, Joahanna Bessière	Jean-Pierre Lemouland, Galilé Marion-Gauvin	JPL Films, Unité centrale, Tchack, Arte France Cinéma	(France) (Canada)	French
Zombillenium	Arthur de Pins, Alexis Ducord	David Nasser	Henri Megalon, Léon Pérahia	Maybe Movies, Belvision, Dupuis Audiovisuel, France 3 Cinéma, Gébéka Films, 2 Minutes Animation, Pipangaï Production, Gao Shan Pictures	(France) (Belgium)	French

== Audience awards ==
=== People's Choice Award ===
The nominees were announced on 1 September 2017.

English title	Director(s)	Production country
Stefan Zweig: Farewell to Europe	Maria Schrader	(Germany) (Austria) (France)
A Monster Calls	J. A. Bayona	(Spain)
Bridget Jones's Baby	Sharon Maguire	(Republic of Ireland) (United Kingdom) (France) (United States)
Fantastic Beasts and Where to Find Them	David Yates	(United Kingdom) (United States)
Frantz	François Ozon	(France) (Germany)
Graduation	Cristian Mungiu	(Romania) (France) (Belgium)
Like Crazy	Paolo Virzì	(Italy) (France)
The Commune	Thomas Vinterberg	(Denmark) (Sweden) (Netherlands)
The Other Side of Hope	Aki Kaurismäki	(Finland) (Germany)

=== University Award ===
The announcement of the five European University Film Award nominations took place during Filmfest Hamburg on 10 October 2017. Films were selected by: Fabian Gasmia (producer / Germany), Juho Kuosmanen (director / Finland), Elli Mastorou (journalist / Belgium/Greece) and Dagmar Brunow (Linnaeus University / Sweden). Five nominated films were screened and discussed in the respective classes and each university voted its favorite film.

English title	Director(s)	Producer(s)	Production companies	Country	Language
Heartstone	Guðmundur Arnar Guðmundsson	Anton Máni Svansson, Lise Orheim Stender, Jesper Morthorst, Guðmundur Arnar Guðmundsson	SF Studios, Join Motion Pictures	(Iceland) (Denmark)	Icelandic
Home	Fien Troch	Antonino Lombardo, Jacques-Henri Bronckart, Olivier Bronckart	Prime Time, Versus Production	(Belgium)	Flemish, Dutch
Loveless	Andrey Zvyagintsev	Alexander Rodnyansky, Sergey Melkumov, Gleb Fetisov	Arte France Cinéma, Fetisoff Illusion, Les Films du Fleuve, Non-Stop Production, Senator Film Produktion, Why Not Productions	(Russia) (Belgium) (Germany) (France)	Russian
The Other Side of Hope	Aki Kaurismäki	Aki Kaurismäki	Sputnik, Oy Bufo Ab, ZDF	(Finland) (Germany)	Finnish, English, Arabic
The War Show	Andreas Dalsgaard, Obaidah Zytoon	Miriam Nørgaard, Alaa Hassan	Fridthjof Film, Oktober, Yleisradio	(Denmark) (Syria) (Finland)	Arabic

== Best Documentary ==
English title	Director(s)	Producer(s)	Production companies	Country	Language
Communion	Anna Zamecka	Anna Wydra, Anna Zamecka, Zuzanna Krol, Izabela Lopuch, Hanka Kastelicova	Wajda Studio, HBO Europe, Otter Films	(Poland)	Polish
Austerlitz	Sergei Loznitsa	Sergei Loznitsa	Imperativ Film, BKM, German Federal Film Board	(Germany)	German, English, Spanish
La Chana	Lucija Stojevic	Lucija Stojevic, Greta Olafsdottir, Deirdre Towers, Susan Muska	Noon Films S.L.	(Spain) (Iceland) (United States)	Spanish
Stranger in Paradise	Guido Hendrikx	Frank van den Engel	Zeppers Film & TV	(Netherlands)	English
The Good Postman	Tonislav Hristov	Kaarle Aho, Kai Nordberg	Making Movies Oy, Soul Food	(Finland) (Bulgaria)	Bulgarian

== Best Short Film ==
Original title	Director(s)	Type	Minutes	Production country	Language(s)
Timecode	Juanjo Giménez		15 min	(Spain)	
Copa-Loca	Christos Massalas		14 min	(Greece)	
En La Boca	Matteo Gariglio		26 min	(Switzerland) (Argentina)	
Fight on a Swedish Beach	Simon Vahlne		15 min	(Sweden)	
Information Skies	Daniel van der Velden, Vinca Kruk		24 min	(Netherlands) (South Korea)	
LOVE	Réka Bucsi		14 min	(Hungary) (France)	
Os Humores Artificiais (The Artificial Humors)	Gabriel Abrantes		29 min	(Portugal)	
HEVÊRK (The Circle)	Rûken Tekes		14 min	(Turkey)	
Los Desheredados (The Disinherited)	Laura Ferrés		19 min	(Spain)	
The Party	Andrea Harkin		14 min	(Republic of Ireland)	
Ugly	Nikita Diakur		12 min	(Germany)	
Wannabe	Jannis Lenz		30 min	(Austria) (Germany)	
SCRIS/NESCRIS (Written/Unwritten)	Adrian Silisteanu		20 min	(Romania)	
GROS CHAGRIN (You will be fine)	Céline Devaux		15 min	(France)	
Jeunes Hommes à la fenêtre (Young Men at their Window)	Loukianos Moshonas		18 min	(France)	

== European Co-Production Award — Prix Eurimages ==
Recipient	Occupation
(Croatia) Čedomir Kolar	Producer

== Honorary Awards ==
=== European Achievement in World Cinema ===
Recipient	Occupation
(France) Julie Delpy	Actress, screenwriter and director

=== Lifetime Achievement Award ===
Recipient	Occupation
(Russia) Aleksandr Sokurov	Director, screenwriter and cinematographer
