= Mesterházy =

Mesterházy is a surname. Notable people with the surname include:

- Attila Mesterházy, Hungarian parliamentarian
- Ernő Mesterházy
