= Alexandra Borbély =

Slovak-Hungarian theatre and film actress

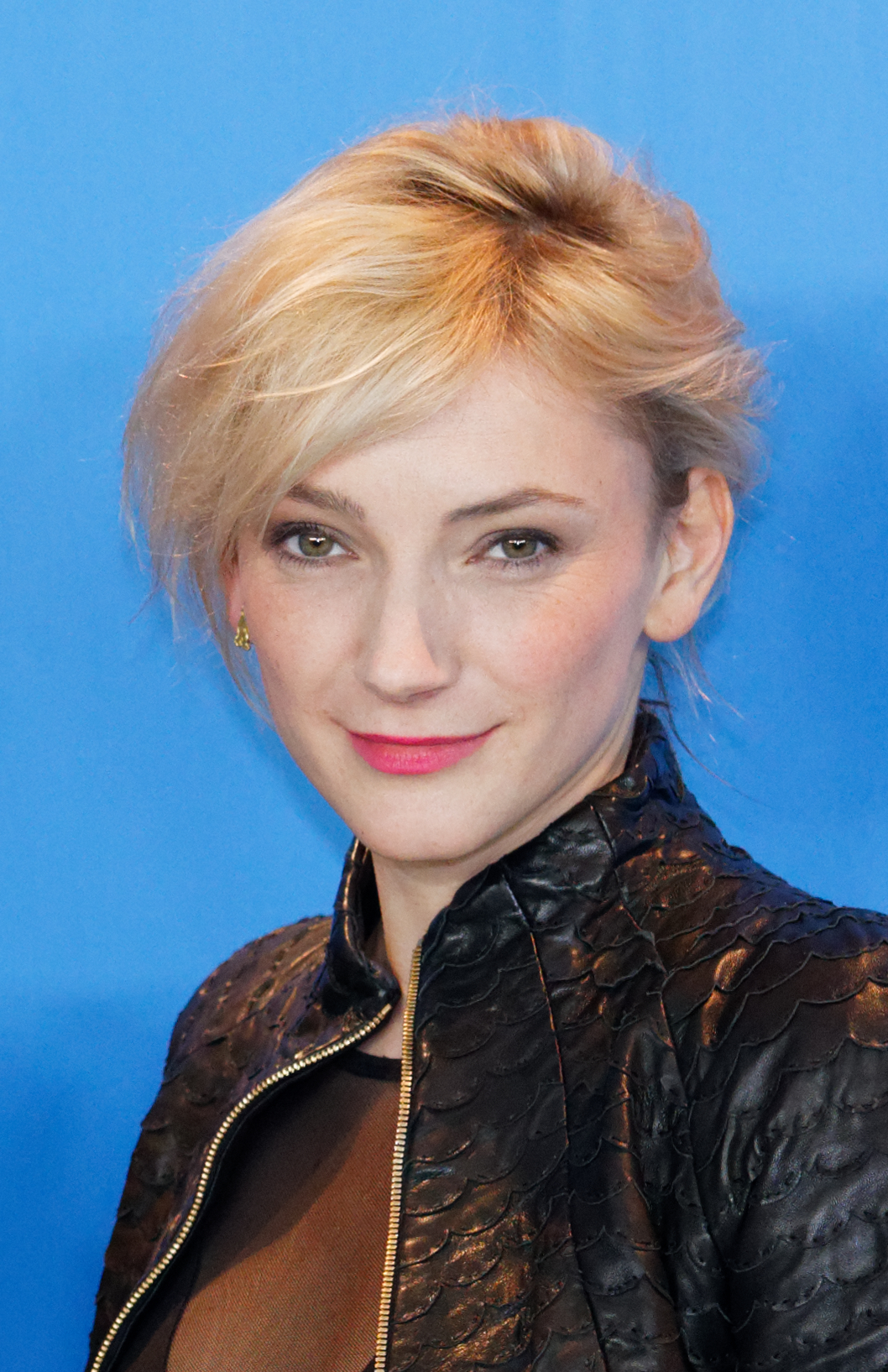
- Alexandra Borbély at press conference in 2017 at the Berlin International Film Festival
- Born: Alexandra Borbélyová; 4 September 1986 (age 40); Nitra, Czechoslovakia
- Occupation: Actress
- Years active: 2009–present
- Spouse: Ervin Nagy (m. 2021)

Alexandra Borbély, legally known as Alexandra Borbélyová (born 4 September 1986), is a Slovak theatre and film actress acting in Hungarian films, notable for playing the role of Mária in the film On Body and Soul (2017).

== Biography ==
She was born in Nitra (then part of Czechoslovakia), and has two siblings: younger brother Dávid and sister Dominika. She is a member of the Hungarian minority in Slovakia.

Borbély graduated from a high school in Komárno and from the Academy of Performing Arts in Bratislava, and subsequently went to Budapest to study acting. Since her graduation in 2012 from the University of Theatre and Film Arts, she works at the József Katona Theatre in Budapest. In 2017 she won the Best Actress award at the European Film Awards for her performance in On Body and Soul.

== Filmography ==
- Swing (2014)
- On Body and Soul (2017)
- The Hungarian Dressmaker (2024)
- Chica Checa, (2026) a comedy drama directed by Šimon Holý as Réka.
