= Tenke =

Tenke may refer to:

- Tenke, the Hungarian name for Tinca Commune, Bihor County, Romania
- Tenke, Democratic Republic of the Congo
- Tibor Tenke, (born 1953), Hungarian sports sailor

== See also ==
- Tenki (disambiguation)
- Temke
