= Carol Scanlan =

Irish film actress

- Born: Dublin, Ireland
- Known for: Reefer and the Model (1988)
- Awards: Nominated for European Film Award for Best Actress, 1988

Carol Scanlan, Carol Moore is an Irish film actress, best known for her portrayal in the 1988 film Reefer and the Model. She was nominated for European Film Award for Best Actress for the film (the first and only Irish actress to do so). She rose to prominence for her portrayal of the model "Theresa" in the film. She appeared as Moore in Five Minutes of Heaven. She wrote and directed a short documentary This Belfast Thing and directed The Farther, The Dearer.
