= Călin Peter Netzer =

Romanian film director (born 1975)

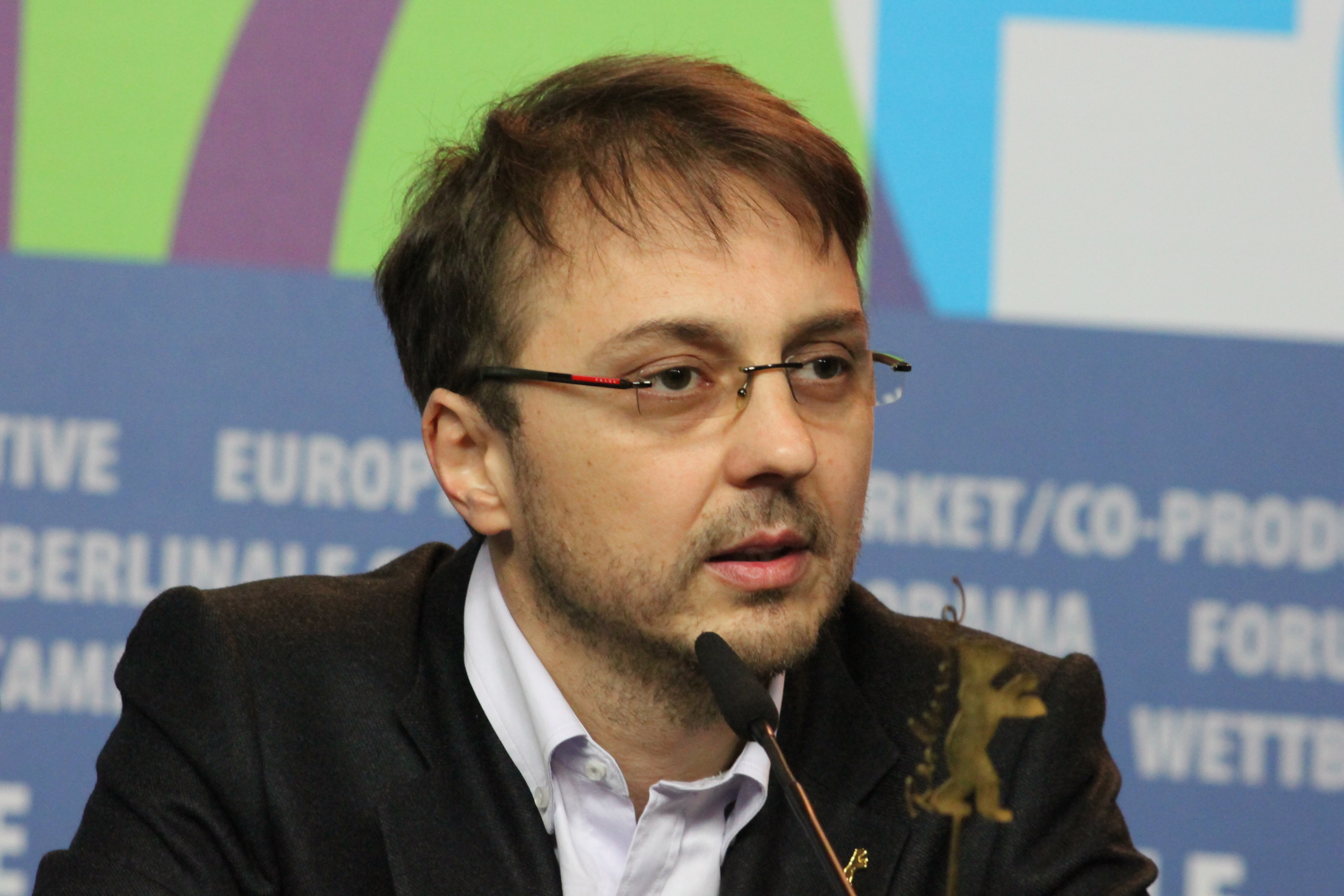
- Călin Peter Netzer at the 63rd Berlinale in February 2013
- Born: 1 May 1975 (age 51); Petroșani, Romania
- Education: Caragiale National University of Theatre and Film
- Occupation: Film director
- Years active: 2003–present

Călin Peter Netzer (Romanian: [kəˈlin ˈpetər ˈnet͡sər]; born 1 May 1975) is a Romanian film director who won the Golden Bear at the 63rd Berlin International Film Festival.

Born in Petroșani to a family of Romanian and German origins, Netzer emigrated with his family to West Germany in 1983. In 1994, he returned to Romania in order to study film direction at the Academy of Theatre and Film in Bucharest.

His first feature film, Maria (2003), won the Special Prize of the Jury at the Locarno International Film Festival, among other prizes at this and other film festivals.

Poziția copilului (Child's Pose, 2013), his third feature film, won him the Golden Bear at the 63rd Berlin International Film Festival. The film was selected as the Romanian entry for the Best Foreign Language Film at the 86th Academy Awards.

== Selected filmography ==
Year	Title	Notes
2003	Maria	
2009	Medal of Honor	
2013	Child's Pose	
2017	Ana, mon amour	
2023	Familiar	
