= 16th European Film Awards =

2003 film awards ceremony in Germany

- Date: December 6, 2003
- Site: Treptow Arena, Berlin, Germany
- Hosted by: Heino Ferch
- Organized by: European Film Academy

Highlights
- Best Picture: Good Bye, Lenin!
- Best Direction: Lars von Trier; Dogville
- Best Actor: Daniel Brühl; Good Bye, Lenin!
- Best Actress: Charlotte Rampling; Swimming Pool
- Most awards: Good Bye, Lenin! (6)
- Most nominations: Good Bye, Lenin! (8)

Television coverage
- Channel: Arte

The 16th European Film Awards were presented on December 6, 2003 in Berlin, Germany. The winners were selected by the members of the European Film Academy.

== Awards ==
=== Best Film ===
English title	Original title	Director(s)	Country
Good Bye, Lenin!		Wolfgang Becker	Germany
Dirty Pretty Things		Stephen Frears	United Kingdom
Dogville		Lars von Trier	Denmark, Netherlands, Sweden, France, United Kingdom, Germany
In This World		Michael Winterbottom	United Kingdom
My Life Without Me	Mi vida sin mí	Isabel Coixet	Spain, Canada
Swimming Pool		François Ozon	France, United Kingdom

=== Best Director ===
Nominee	English title	Original title
Lars Von Trier	Dogville	
Nuri Bilge Ceylan	Distant	Uzak
Wolfgang Becker	Good Bye, Lenin!	
Michael Winterbottom	In This World	
Isabel Coixet	My Life Without Me	Mi vida sin mí
Marco Tullio Giordana	The Best of Youth	La meglio gioventù

=== Best Screenwriter ===
Nominee(s)	English title	Original title
Bernd Lichtenberg	Good Bye, Lenin!	
Steven Knight	Dirty Pretty Things	
Lars Von Trier	Dogville	
Sandro Petraglia and Stefano Rulli	The Best of Youth	La meglio gioventù
Hanif Kureishi	The Mother	

=== Best Actor ===
Nominee	English title	Original title
Daniel Brühl	Good Bye, Lenin!	
Chiwetel Ejiofor	Dirty Pretty Things	
Bruno Tedeschi	His Brother	Son frère
Tomas Lemarquis	Noi the Albino	Nói albínói
Luigi Lo Cascio	The Best of Youth	La meglio gioventù

=== Best Actress ===
Nominee(s)	Title
Charlotte Rampling	Swimming Pool
Helen Mirren	Calendar Girls
Katrin Sass	Good Bye, Lenin!
Diana Dumbrava	Maria
Katja Riemann	Rosenstrasse
Anne Reid	The Mother

=== Best Documentary ===
English title	Original title	Director(s)	Country
S-21: The Khmer Rouge Killing Machine	S-21, la machine de mort Khmère Rouge	Rithy Panh	Cambodia, France
A Species Odyssey	L'odyssée de l'espèce	Jacques Malaterre	France, Canada, Belgium
Eat, Sleep, No Women		Heiner Stadler	Germany
Hush!	Тише!	Victor Kossakovsky	Russia
The Day I Will Never Forget		Kim Longinotto	United Kingdom
The Five Obstructions	De fem benspænd	Lars von Trier and Jørgen Leth	Denmark, Netherlands, Sweden, France, United Kingdom, Germany
The Story of the Weeping Camel	Die Geschichte vom weinenden Kame	Byambasuren Daava and Luigi Falorni	Germany
Whose Is This Song?	Chia e tazi pesen?	Adela Peeva	Italy

=== European Discovery ===
English title	Original title	Director(s)	Country
The Return	Возвращение	Andrei Zvyagintsev	Russia
Fuse	Gori vatra	Pjer Žalica	Bosnia and Herzegovina, Austria, Turkey, France
The Hours of the Day	Las horas del día	Jaime Rosales	Spain
Whatever You Say	Mon idole	Guillaume Canet	France
Reconstruction		Christoffer Boe	Denmark
Schultze Gets the Blues		Michael Schorr	Germany
Young Adam		David Mackenzie	United Kingdom, France

=== Best Cinematographer ===
Nominee(s)	English title	Original title
Anthony Dod Mantle	Dogville	
Chris Menges	Dirty Pretty Things	
Bogumil Godfrejow	Distant Lights	Lichter
Italo Petriccione	I'm Not Scared	Io non ho paura
Marcel Zyskind	In This World	
Tom Fährmann	The Miracle of Bern	Das Wunder von Bern

=== Lifetime Achievement Award ===
Recipient	Occupation
(France) Claude Chabrol	film director
