= On Body and Soul =

2017 film

- Hungarian theatrical release poster
- Hungarian: Testről és lélekről
- Directed by: Ildikó Enyedi
- Written by: Ildikó Enyedi
- Produced by: Ernő Mesterházy; András Muhi; Mónika Mécs
- Starring: Géza Morcsányi; Alexandra Borbély
- Cinematography: Máté Herbai
- Edited by: Károly Szalai
- Music by: Ádám Balázs
- Distributed by: Mozinet
- Release dates: 10 February 2017 (Berlin); 2 March 2017 (Hungary)
- Running time: 116 minutes
- Country: Hungary
- Language: Hungarian
- Box office: $2.1 million

On Body and Soul (Hungarian: Testről és lélekről) is a 2017 Hungarian drama film written and directed by Ildikó Enyedi. The story revolves around the CFO of a slaughterhouse and the newly appointed meat quality inspector who discover they can communicate with each other through their dreams, leading to an unlikely romance. It won the Golden Bear in the main competition section of the 67th Berlin International Film Festival. At Berlin it also won the FIPRESCI Prize and the Prize of the Ecumenical Jury. It was selected as the Hungarian entry for the Best Foreign Language Film and was nominated at the 90th Academy Awards. Alexandra Borbély won the European Actress award at the European Film Awards for her performance in the film.

== Plot ==
Endre, the CFO at an abattoir, and Mária, the newly hired quality inspector, experience a recurring dream of being a pair of deer in the forest, though they are not aware that it is a shared dream.

Mária is immediately unpopular at work for her autistic behavior and uncompromising grading of the abattoir's meat quality. Though Endre tries to befriend her, she quickly becomes uncomfortable with the interaction and rudely comments on his lame left arm, believing it may be a factor in his favorite food in the cafeteria. However, she repeats the conversation to herself that night, analyzing where she made her mistakes. Meanwhile, the abattoir hires a new butcher, Sanyi, who Endre takes a quick dislike to due to his cocky demeanor and unsympathetic view toward the slaughtered animals.

The abattoir is put under investigation when mating powder is stolen from the inventory; Endre and his friend Jenő both suspect that Sanyi is the culprit. A psychologist is hired to perform personality tests on the workers to discover the culprit. The workers are asked questions on the history of their sexuality and physical development, as well as what they dreamed the night before. When Endre and Mária both report the same dream, the psychologist assumes they are playing a prank. Though Endre and Mária are both skeptical, they realize that they are indeed experiencing the same dream and grow closer. Though Mária's behavior temporarily drives Endre away, they eventually form a tight bond. Endre also learns that Jenő stole the mating powder but chooses not to inform the police as there are no victims, and he apologizes to Sanyi for suspecting him.

Endre and Mária decide to fall asleep in the same room one night, but both are unable to sleep. Although she loves him, Mária shuts down when Endre touches her after a night of playing cards, leaving Endre offended and confused. The incident affects Mária, and she begins to open herself up to new experiences and sensations, such as listening to romantic music, watching pornography, and observing couples at the park.

However, Endre has grown pessimistic about their budding relationship and calls it off. He sleeps with another woman, though the encounter leaves him disappointed. A devastated Mária prepares to commit suicide at home, calmly slitting her wrist in the bathtub. The suicide is interrupted by Endre calling her, and after a short and awkward conversation, he reveals that he loves her, which Mária reciprocates. After getting her wound bandaged, she goes to Endre's home, where they have sex. After falling asleep, they wake up to realize that neither of them dreamed the night before.

== Cast ==
- Alexandra Borbély as Mária
- Géza Morcsányi as Endre
- Réka Tenki as Klára
- Zoltán Schneider as Jenő
- Ervin Nagy as Sanyi
- Itala Békés as Zsóka

== Reception ==
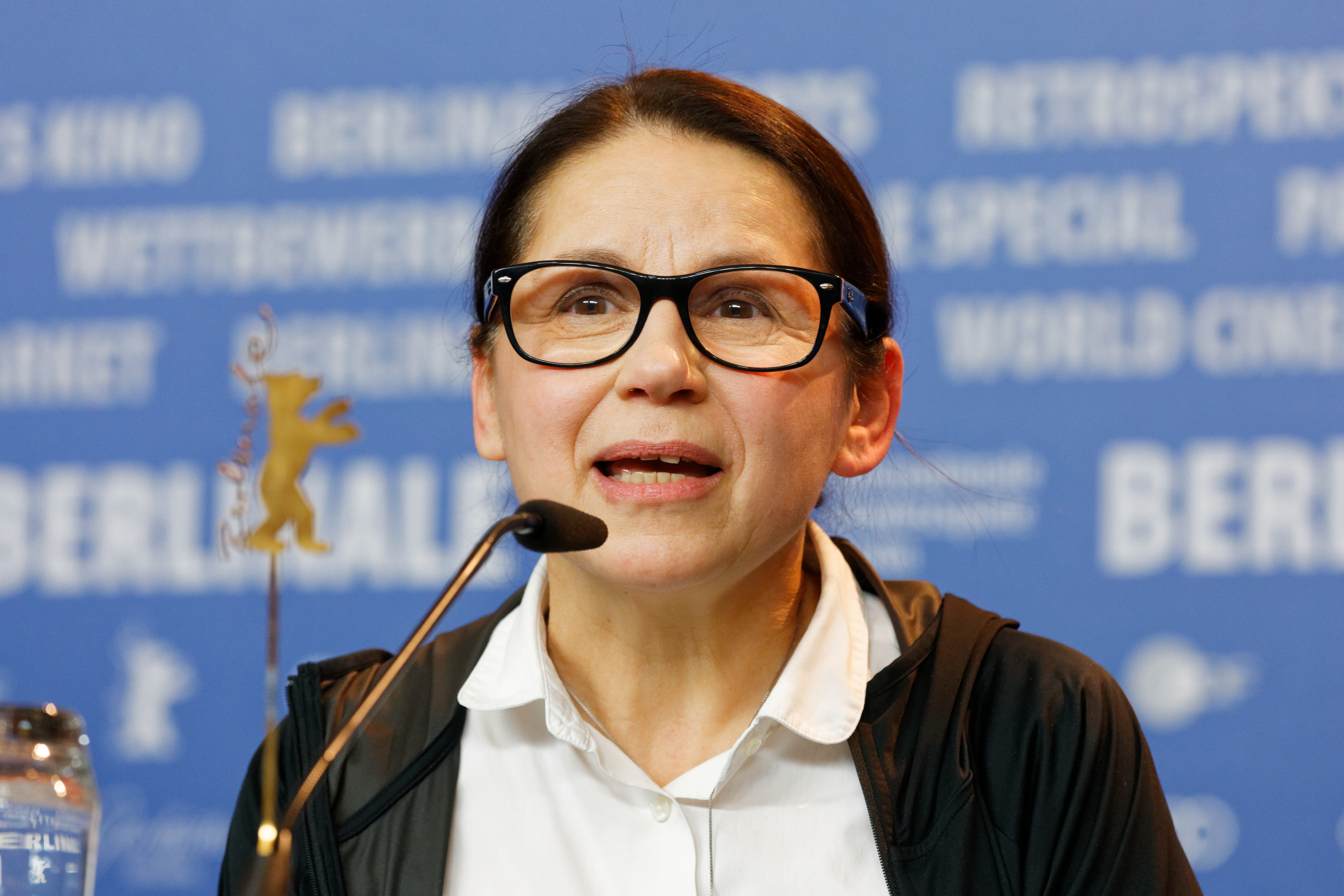
Ildikó Enyedi at the film's press conference in Berlin

On review aggregator Rotten Tomatoes, the film has an approval rating of 90%, based on 78 reviews, with an average rating of 7.3/10. The website's critical consensus reads, "Tender performances and a strong sense of style combine to create an eccentric, dreamy portrait of love and loneliness in On Body and Soul." On Metacritic, the film has a score of 77 out of 100, based on 10 critics, indicating "generally favorable reviews".

== Accolades ==
Year	Award	Category	Recipients	Result	Ref.
2018	Academy Awards	Best Foreign Language Film	On Body and Soul	Nominated	
2018	American Society of Cinematographers Awards	Spotlight Award	Máté Herbai	Nominated	
2017	Berlin International Film Festival	Golden Bear	Ildikó Enyedi	Won	
2017	Berlin International Film Festival	Prize of the Ecumenical Jury	Ildikó Enyedi	Won	
2017	Berlin International Film Festival	FIPRESCI Prize	Ildikó Enyedi	Won	
2017	Berlin International Film Festival	Reader Jury of the "Berliner Morgenpost"	Ildikó Enyedi	Won	
2017	European Film Awards	Best Film	Ernő Mesterházy, András Muhi, Mónika Mécs and Ildikó Enyedi	Nominated	
2017	European Film Awards	Best Director	Ildikó Enyedi	Nominated	
2017	European Film Awards	Best Screenwriter	Ildikó Enyedi	Nominated	
2017	European Film Awards	Best Actress	Alexandra Borbély	Won	

== See also ==
- List of submissions to the 90th Academy Awards for Best Foreign Language Film
- List of Hungarian submissions for the Academy Award for Best International Feature Film
