= Sigríður Hagalín =

Icelandic actress

Sigríður Hagalín (7 December 1926 – 26 December 1992) was an Icelandic actress. She gained global popularity for her portrayal of Stella in the 1991 film Children of Nature. She was nominated for European Film Award for Best Actress and the film was nominated for Best Foreign Language Film's Oscar.

== Career ==
She marked her debut in Icelandic film industry in 1941. She became one of the top actresses in the 1950s. In 1991, she appeared in the globally acclaimed film Children of Nature. It is the only Icelandic film ever to be nominated for Academy Award for Best Foreign Language Film. For her role Stella, she was internationally praised and was nominated for European Film Award for Best Actress in 1991 at the age of 65.
