= Child's Pose (film) =

2013 film

- Romanian theatrical release poster
- Directed by: Călin Peter Netzer
- Written by: Răzvan Rădulescu; Călin Peter Netzer
- Produced by: Ada Solomon
- Starring: Luminița Gheorghiu; Bogdan Dumitrache; Vlad Ivanov
- Cinematography: Andrei Butică
- Release dates: 11 February 2013 (Berlinale); 8 March 2013 (Romania)
- Running time: 112 minutes
- Country: Romania
- Language: Romanian
- Budget: €850,000

Child's Pose (Romanian: Poziția copilului) is a 2013 Romanian drama film directed by Călin Peter Netzer, co-written by Netzer and Răzvan Rădulescu. It follows a overprotective mother attempts to safeguard her son after a hit and run traffic accident.

The film had its world premiere in the main competition of the 63rd Berlin International Film Festival on 11 February 2013, where it won the Golden Bear. It was selected as the Romanian entry for the Best Foreign Language Film at the 86th Academy Awards, but it was not nominated. At the 26th European Film Awards, Luminița Gheorghiu was nominated as the Best Actress.

== Cast ==
- Luminița Gheorghiu as Cornelia Keneres (The Mother)
- Bogdan Dumitrache as Barbu (The Son)
- Vlad Ivanov as Dinu Laurențiu
- Florin Zamfirescu as Domnul Făgărășanu
- Ilinca Goia as Carmen
- Natașa Raab as Olga Cerchez
- Adrian Titieni as Father
- Mimi Brănescu as Policeman

== Release ==
It was screened in the Contemporary World Cinema section at the 2013 Toronto International Film Festival. The film won the Telia Film Award at the Stockholm International Film Festival 2013.

== Reception ==
=== Critical reception ===
On review aggregator website Rotten Tomatoes, the film has a 92% approval rating based on 85 reviews, and an average rating of 7.5/10. The website's critical consensus reads, "It isn't necessarily an easy watch, but thanks to Netzer's interesting direction and a riveting performance from Gheorghiu, Child's Pose is rewarding." On Metacritic, the film has a weighted average score of 67 out of 100, based on 23 critics.

=== Controversy ===
The film was initially refused financing by the Romanian film board due to its controversial depiction of the Hungarian minority in Romania. After an intervention by the Minister of Culture, Hunor Kelemen the ruling of the film board was overruled.

== Awards ==
- 2013: Golden Bear, Berlinale
- 2013: Telia Film Award, Stockholm International Film Festival

== See also ==
- Romanian New Wave
- List of submissions to the 86th Academy Awards for Best Foreign Language Film
- List of Romanian submissions for the Academy Award for Best Foreign Language Film
