= Réka Tenki =

Hungarian actress (born 1986)

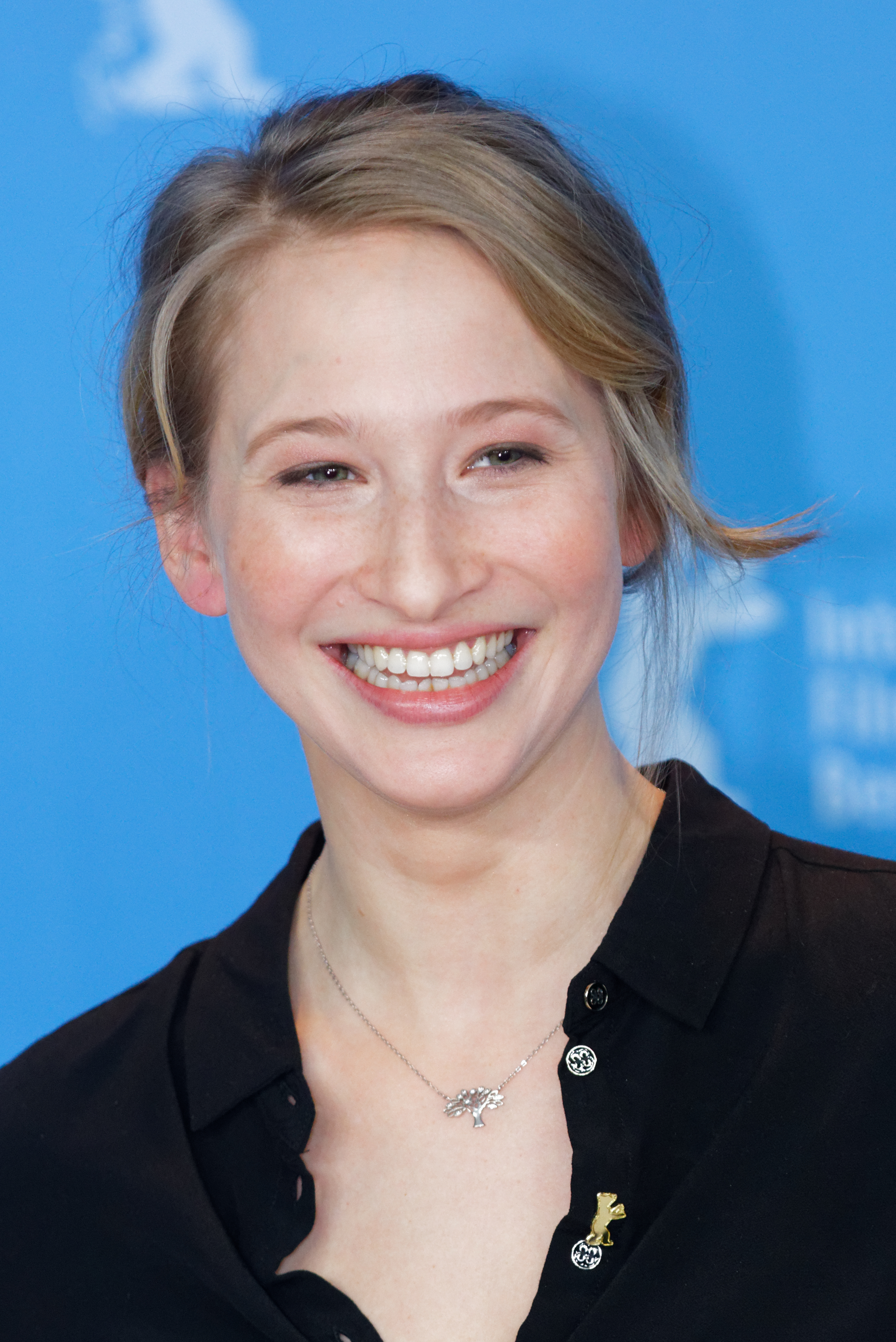
Réka Tenki Photo Call On Body and Soul Berlinale 2017.

Réka Tenki (born 18 June 1986) is a Hungarian actress. Her film credits include On Body and Soul and Budapest Noir. Her television credits include Mellékhatás (televíziós sorozat).

== Early life ==
Réka Tenki was born on 18 June 1986 in Debrecen.
