= Ernő Mesterházy =

Hungarian politician and businessman

- Born: 1963; Enese, Hungary
- Spouse: Mónika Mécs
- Children: 3

Ernő Mesterházy (not to be mistaken with Attila Mesterházy of the Hungarian Socialist Party) has been a chief counsellor to Gábor Demszky, mayor of Budapest. Mesterházy is an influential and powerful businessman, a film producer, and owns a record company too, Bahia Music.

Ernő Mesterházy has been working not only as a counsellor to Demszky but also he had an authorization, a contract to represent Demszky in financial matters of Budapest including Metro building and BKV (Budapest's public transport company). Although he's been doing this for several years his contract was signed only in summer 2009.

== Film production career ==
Mesterházy has been involved in the film industry since the early 1990s. Between 1993 and 2002 he produced a documentary series in South-East Asia called Indiék with Gábor Rohonyi, Nimród Antal and István Szaladják as the directors and István Szatmáry and Péter Vajda as cameramen.

Since 2007 together with his wife Mónika Mécs, he has actively participated in producing feature films. The first significant success was 2007 film's week surprise, where they won the audience's vote with their film called The End. After this time period they received more Hungarian and International recognition and acknowledgement. One of the most significant national prizes Mesterházy won was with the Hungarian film called Just the Wind, which was directed by Benedek Fliegauf. The film competed at the 62nd Berlin International Film Festival, where it won the Jury Grand Prix.

In 2017 at the Berlin International Film Festival they won the Golden Bear in the main competition section with their film called On Body and Soul directed by Ildikó Enyedi. Furthermore, the Sydney Film Festival wrapped up their 64th fest by naming On Body and Soul the winner of that year's Sydney Film Prize.
