= Diana Dumbrava =

Romanian actress

- Born: April 6, 1967 (age 59); Bacău, Romania
- Known for: Maria (2003)
- Awards: nominated for European Film Award for Best Actress, 2004

Diana Dumbrava (born April 06, 1967) is a Romanian film actress, better known for her portrayal in 2003 film Maria. She was nominated for European Film Award for Best Actress for the film.

== Filmography ==
- The Dot Man (2017) as Turcu
- Roxanne (2013) as Roxana
- Highschool in Less Than 54 Hours (2011) as Cristina
- California Dreamin' (2007) as Doiaru's Mother
- Orient Express (2004)
- Maria (2003)

=== TV shows ===
- Umbre (2017)
- Adina (2008)
