= Maria (2003 film) =

- Directed by: Călin Peter Netzer
- Starring: Diana Dumbrava; Horațiu Mălăele
- Release date: 13 August 2003 (LIFF)
- Running time: 1h 37min
- Countries: Romania; France; Germany
- Language: Romanian

Maria is a 2003 Romanian-French-German drama film directed by Călin Peter Netzer. The film won three awards at the 2003 Locarno International Film Festival.

== Cast ==
- Diana Dumbrava - Maria
- Horațiu Mălăele - Milco
- Șerban Ionescu - Ion
- Luminița Gheorghiu - Maia
- Rona Hartner - Nuti
- Florin Călinescu - Supervisor
- Florin Zamfirescu - Ahmed
- Alexandru Bindea - Officer
