= 2nd European Film Awards =

1989 film award ceremony in Paris, France

- Date: 25 November 1989
- Site: Théâtre des Champs-Elysées, Paris
- Hosted by: Agnès Soral and Fernando Rey
- Organized by: European Film Academy
- Official website: www.europeanfilmawards.eu

Highlights
- Best Picture: Landscape in the Mist
- Best Direction: Géza Bereményi; The Midas Touch
- Best Actor: Philippe Noiret; Cinema Paradiso; Life and Nothing But
- Best Actress: Ruth Sheen; High Hopes
- Most awards: High Hopes (3)
- Most nominations: The Midas Touch and Little Vera (5)

The 2nd Annual European Film Awards, presented by the European Film Academy, recognized excellence in European cinema. The ceremony took place on 25 November 1989 at the Théâtre des Champs-Elysées in Paris, France and was hosted by Franco-Swiss actress Agnès Soral and Spanish actor Fernando Rey.

Hungarian film The Midas Touch and Soviet film Little Vera led the nominations with five each while British film High Hopes received the most awards with three wins. Theo Angelopoulos's Landscape in the Mist received the award for Best European Film.

Italian director Federico Fellini received the Lifetime Achievement Award.

== Winners and nominees ==
The winners are in a yellow background and in bold.

=== Best European Film ===
English title	Original title	Director(s)	Producer(s)	Country
**Landscape in the Mist**	**Τοπίο στην ομίχλη**	**Theo Angelopoulos**	**Theo Angelopoulos, Eric Heumann, Amedeo Pagani & Stéphane Sorlat**	**(Greece)**
The Midas Touch	Eldorádó	Géza Bereményi	-	(Hungary)
Magnús		Þráinn Bertelsson	Þráinn Bertelsson	(Iceland)
Recollections of the Yellow House	Recordações da casa amarela	João César Monteiro	Joâo Pedro Benard & Joaquim Pinto	(Portugal)
High Hopes		Mike Leigh	Victor Glynn & Simon Channing-Williams	(United Kingdom)
Little Vera	Маленькая Вера	Vasili Pichul	Gorky Film Studio	(Soviet Union)

=== Best European Director ===
Recipient(s)	English title	Original title
**(Hungary) Géza Bereményi**	**The Midas Touch**	**Eldorádó**
(Greece) Theo Angelopoulos	Landscape in the Mist	Τοπίο στην ομίχλη
(Poland) Maciej Dejczer	300 Miles to Heaven	300 mil do nieba
(Soviet Union) Vasili Pichul	Little Vera	Маленькая Вера
(Republic of Ireland) Jim Sheridan	My Left Foot	

=== Best European Actress ===
Recipient(s)	English title	Original title	Role
**(United Kingdom) Ruth Sheen**	**High Hopes**		**Shirley**
(France) Sabine Azéma	Life and Nothing But	La vie et rien d'autre	Irène de Courtil
(Socialist Federal Republic of Yugoslavia) Snežana Bogdanović	Kuduz		Badema Kuduz
(East Germany) Corinna Harfouch	Treffen in Travers		Therese Forster
(Soviet Union) Natalya Negoda	Little Vera	Маленькая Вера	Vera

=== Best European Actor ===
Recipient(s)	English title	Original title	Role
**(France) Philippe Noiret**	**Cinema Paradiso**	**Nuovo Cinema Paradiso**	**Alfredo**
**(France) Philippe Noiret**	**Life and Nothing But**	**La vie et rien d'autre**	**Commandant Delaplane**
(Republic of Ireland) Daniel Day-Lewis	My Left Foot		Christy Brown
(Socialist Federal Republic of Yugoslavia) Davor Dujmović	Time of the Gypsies	Dom za vesanje	Perhan
(Hungary) Károly Eperjes	The Midas Touch	Eldorádó	Sándor Monori
(Czechoslovakia) Jozef Króner	Thou, Which Art in Heaven	Ти, който си на небето	Geprg Henih

=== Best Supporting Performance ===
Recipient(s)	English title	Original title	Role
**(United Kingdom) Edna Doré**	**High Hopes**		**Mrs Bender**
(Switzerland) Sabine Berg	A Wopbobaloobop a Lopbamboom		Anke Keipes
(Switzerland) Roger Jendly	The Woman from Rose Hill	La femme de Rose Hill	Marcel
(Italy) Alessandro Di Sanzo	Forever Mery	Mery per sempre	Mario "Mery" Libassi
(Soviet Union) Lyudmila Zaytseva	Little Vera	Маленькая Вера	Rita

=== Best Young Film ===
English title	Original title	Director(s)	Producer(s)	Country
**300 Miles to Heaven**	**300 mil do nieba**	**Maciej Dejczer**	**TOR Film Production**	(Poland)
My Left Foot		Jim Sheridan	Noel Pearson	(Republic of Ireland)
Cinema Paradiso	Nuovo Cinema Paradiso	Giuseppe Tornatore	Franco Cristaldi	(Italy)
Kuduz		Ademir Kenović	Bakir Tanović	(Socialist Federal Republic of Yugoslavia)
Scandal		Michael Caton-Jones	Stephen Woolley	(United Kingdom)
Waller's Last Trip	Wallers letzter Gang	Christian Wagner	Christian Wagner	(Germany)
Mist	Sis	Zülfü Livaneli	Ülker Livanelli	(Turkey)

=== Best European Screenwriter ===
Recipient(s)	English title	Original title
**(Soviet Union) Mariya Khmelik**	**Little Vera**	**Маленькая Вера**
(Greece) Thanassis Valtinos	Landscape in the Mist	Τοπίο στην ομίχλη
(Hungary) Géza Bereményi	The Midas Touch	Eldorádó
(Iceland) Þráinn Bertelsson	Magnús	
(Poland) Maciej Dejczer	300 Miles to Heaven	300 mil do nieba

=== Best European Cinematographer ===
Recipient(s)	English title	Original title
(Sweden) **Ulf Brantas and Jörgen Persson**	**The Women on the Roof**	**Kvinnorna på taket**
(Greece) Giorgos Arvanitis	Landscape in the Mist	Τοπίο στην ομίχλη
(Hungary) Sándor Kardos	The Midas Touch	Eldorádó
(Poland) Krzysztof Ptak	300 Miles to Heaven	300 mil do nieba
(Soviet Union) Yefim Reznik	Little Vera	Маленькая Вера

=== Best European Composer ===
Recipient(s)	English title	Original title
(United Kingdom) **Andrew Dickson**	**High Hopes**	
(Socialist Federal Republic of Yugoslavia) Goran Bregović	Kuduz	
(Hungary) Ferenc Darvas	The Midas Touch	Eldorádó
(Poland) Michał Lorenc	300 Miles to Heaven	300 mil do nieba
(United States) Maggie Parke (Luxembourg) Gast Waltzing	A Wopbobaloobop a Lopbamboom	

=== Best Documentary ===
Result	English title	Original title	Director(s)	Country
European Documentary Winner	**Recsk 1950-1953: The Story Of A Secret Concentration Camp In Communist Hungary**	**Recsk 1950–1953, egy titkos kényszermunkatábor története**	**Géza Böszörményi & Lívia Gyarmathy**	(Hungary)
Documentary Film Jury Special Award	**A Tale of the Wind**	**Een verhaal van de wind**	**Joris Ivens & Marceline Loridan**	(Netherlands)

=== Lifetime Achievement Award ===
- **(Italy) Federico Fellini**

=== Special Jury Award ===
- **(France) Bertrand Tavernier for Life and Nothing But**
- **(Italy) Giuseppe Tornatore for Cinema Paradiso**

=== Special Mention Film / Person ===
- **Yugoslavia – Special Mention for the creative spirit of the new films from Sarajevo.**
- **(Czech Republic) Pictures of the Old World (Obrazy starého sveta) – Dušan Hanák**
- **(Republic of Ireland) The Road to God Knows Where – Alan Gilsenan**

=== European Cinema Society Special Award ===
- (France) **Anatole Dauman**
