= European Film Award for Best Actor =

European film award

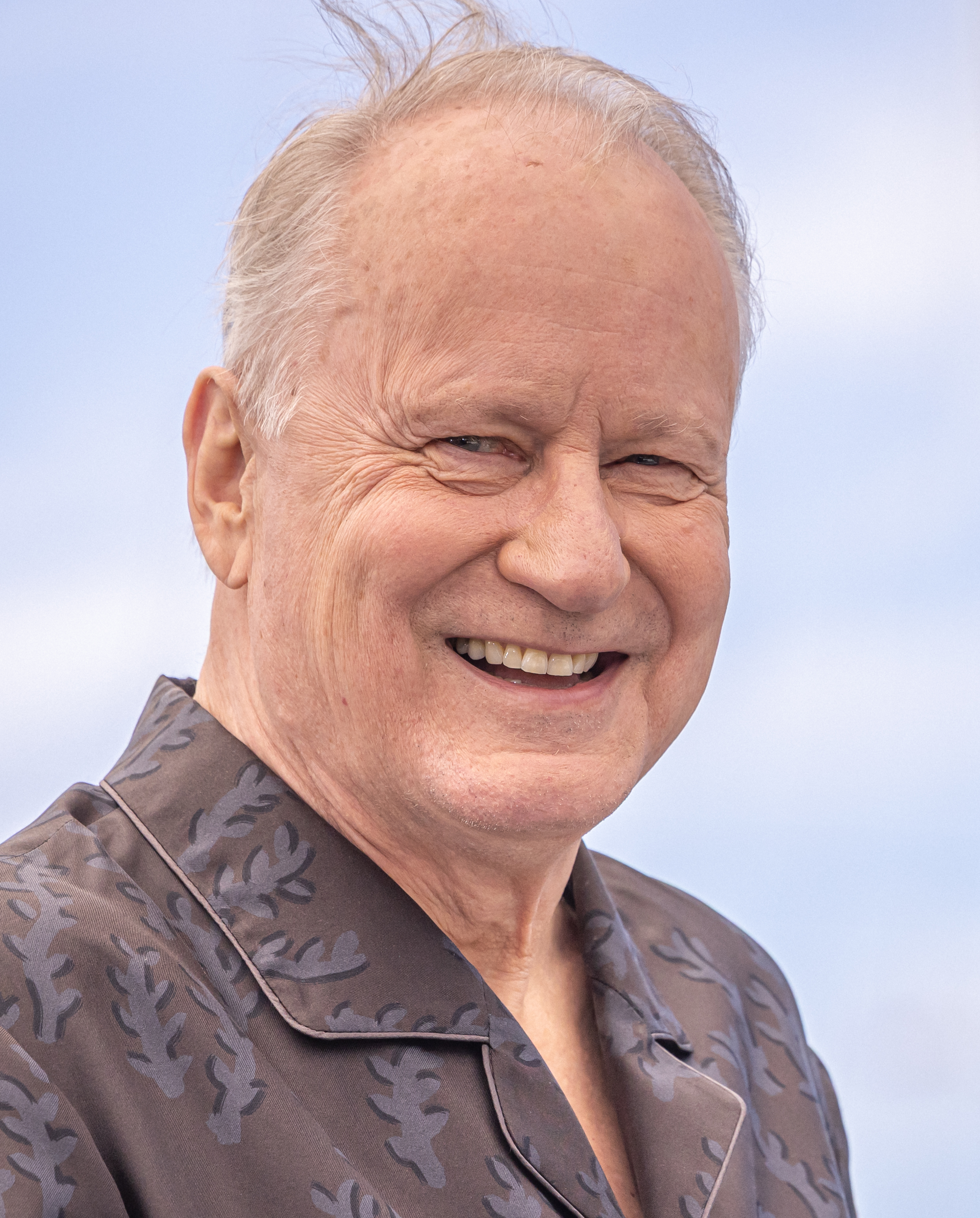
- The 2025 recipient: Stellan Skarsgård
- Awarded for: Best Performance by an Actor in a Leading Role
- Presented by: European Film Academy
- First award: Max von Sydow; Pelle the Conqueror (1988)
- Currently held by: Stellan Skarsgård; Sentimental Value (2025)
- Website: europeanfilmacademy.org

The European Film Award for Best Actor is an award given out at the annual European Film Awards to recognize an actor who has delivered an outstanding leading performance in a film industry. The awards are presented by the European Film Academy (EFA) and was first presented in 1988 to Swedish actor Max von Sydow for his role as Lassefar "Lasse" Karlsson in Pelle the Conqueror.

Daniel Auteuil, Mads Mikkelsen, and Toni Servillo are the only actors who have received this award more than once with two wins each, while Mikkelsen is the most nominated actor in the category with six nominations.

== Winners and nominees ==
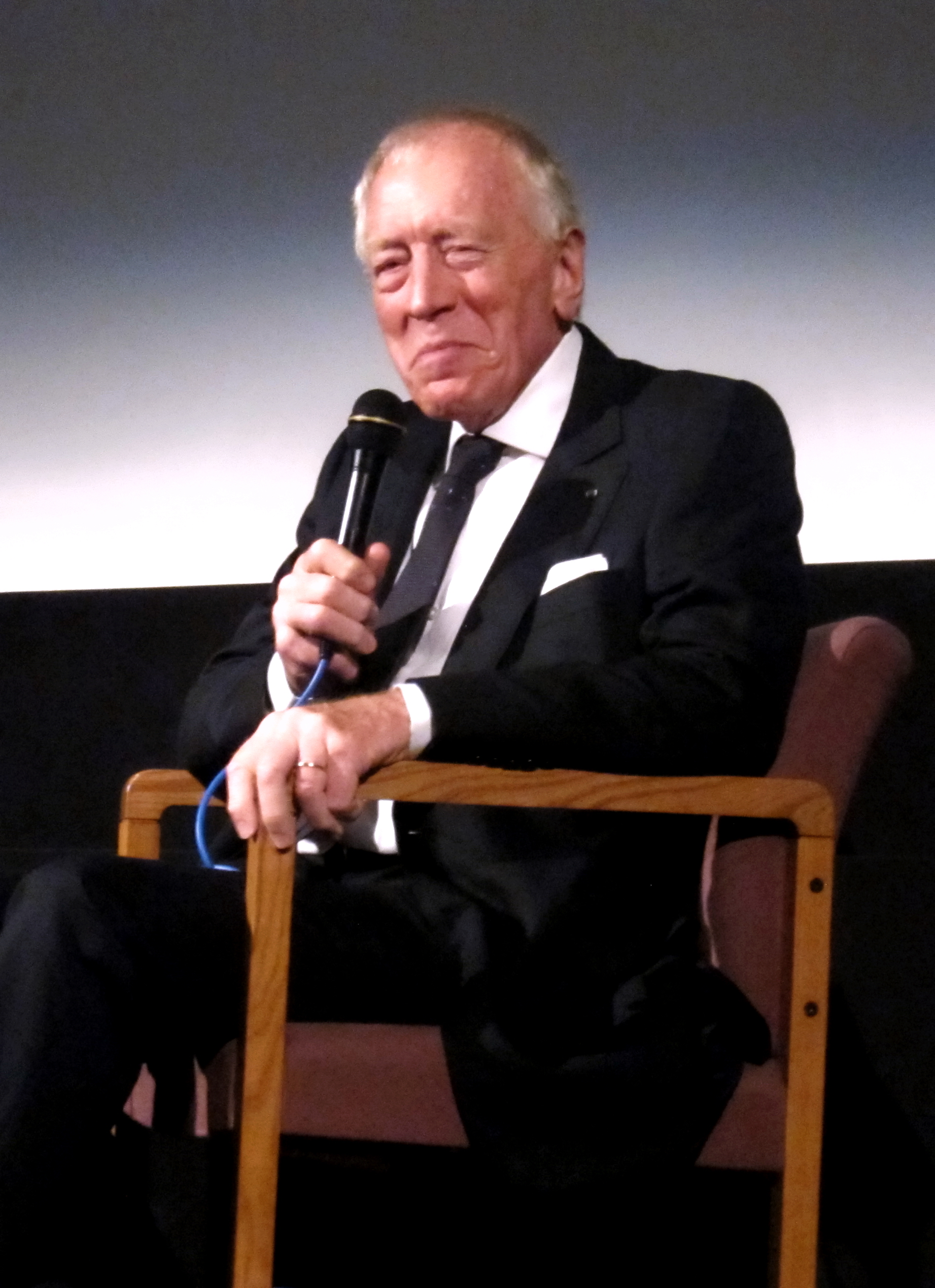
Max von Sydow won for his role in Pelle the Conqueror in 1988.

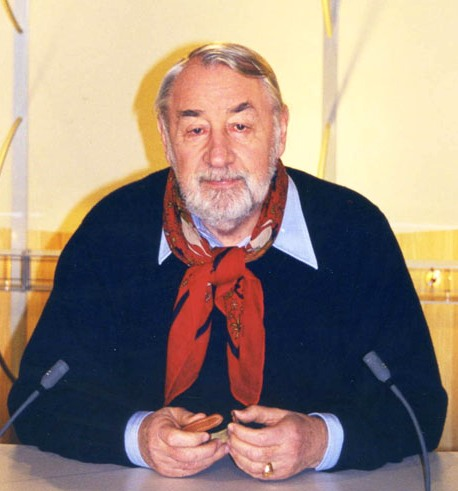
Philippe Noiret won for his roles in Life and Nothing But and Cinema Paradiso in 1989.

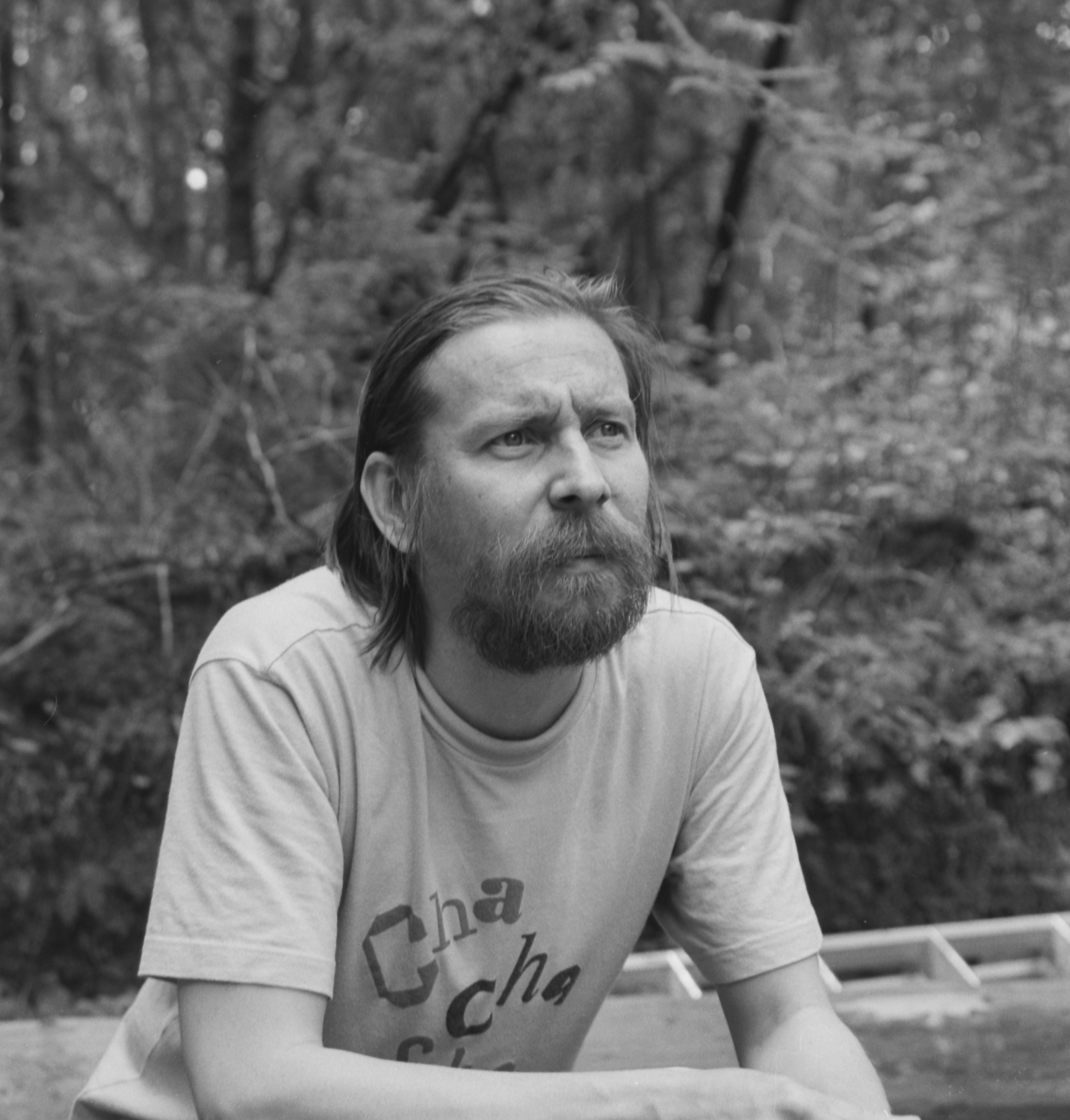
Matti Pellonpää won for his role in La Vie de bohème in 1992.

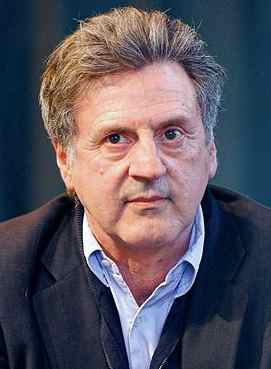
Daniel Auteuil has won twice for his roles in A Heart in Winter (1993) and Caché (2005).

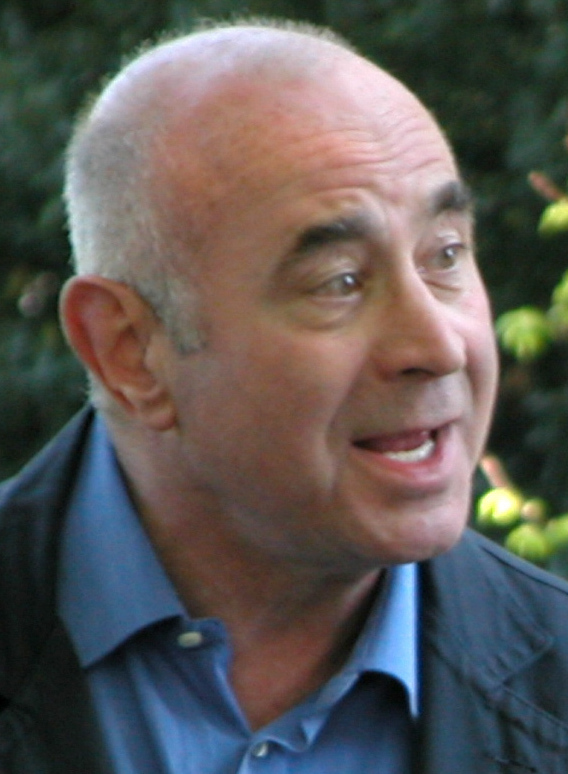
Bob Hoskins won for his role in Twenty Four Seven in 1997.

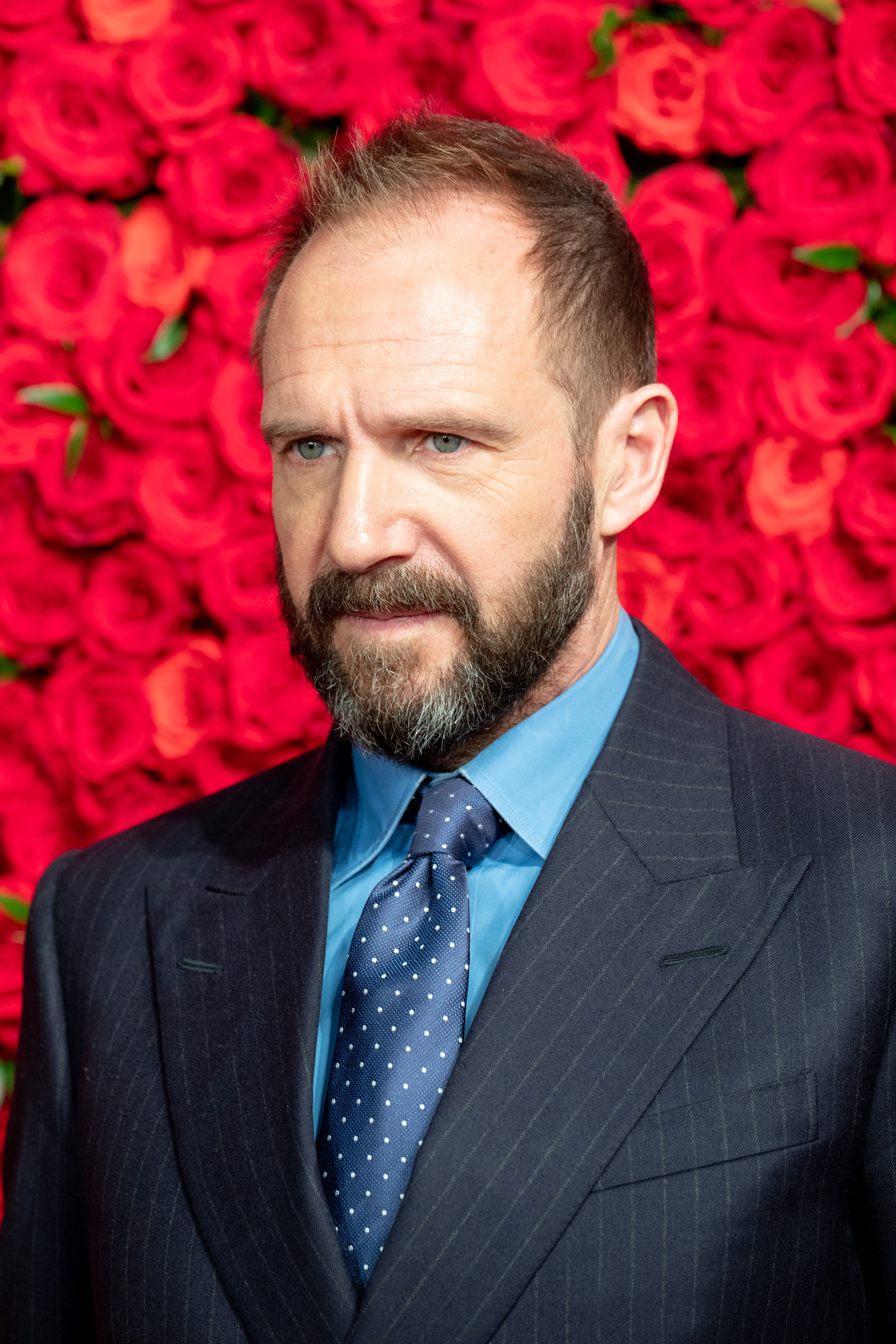
Ralph Fiennes won for his role in Sunshine in 1999.

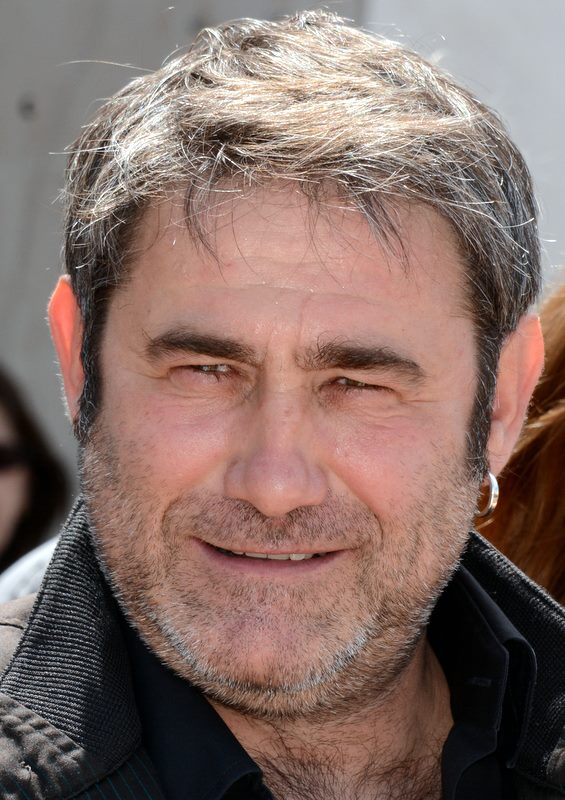
Sergi López won for his role in Harry, He's Here to Help in 2000.

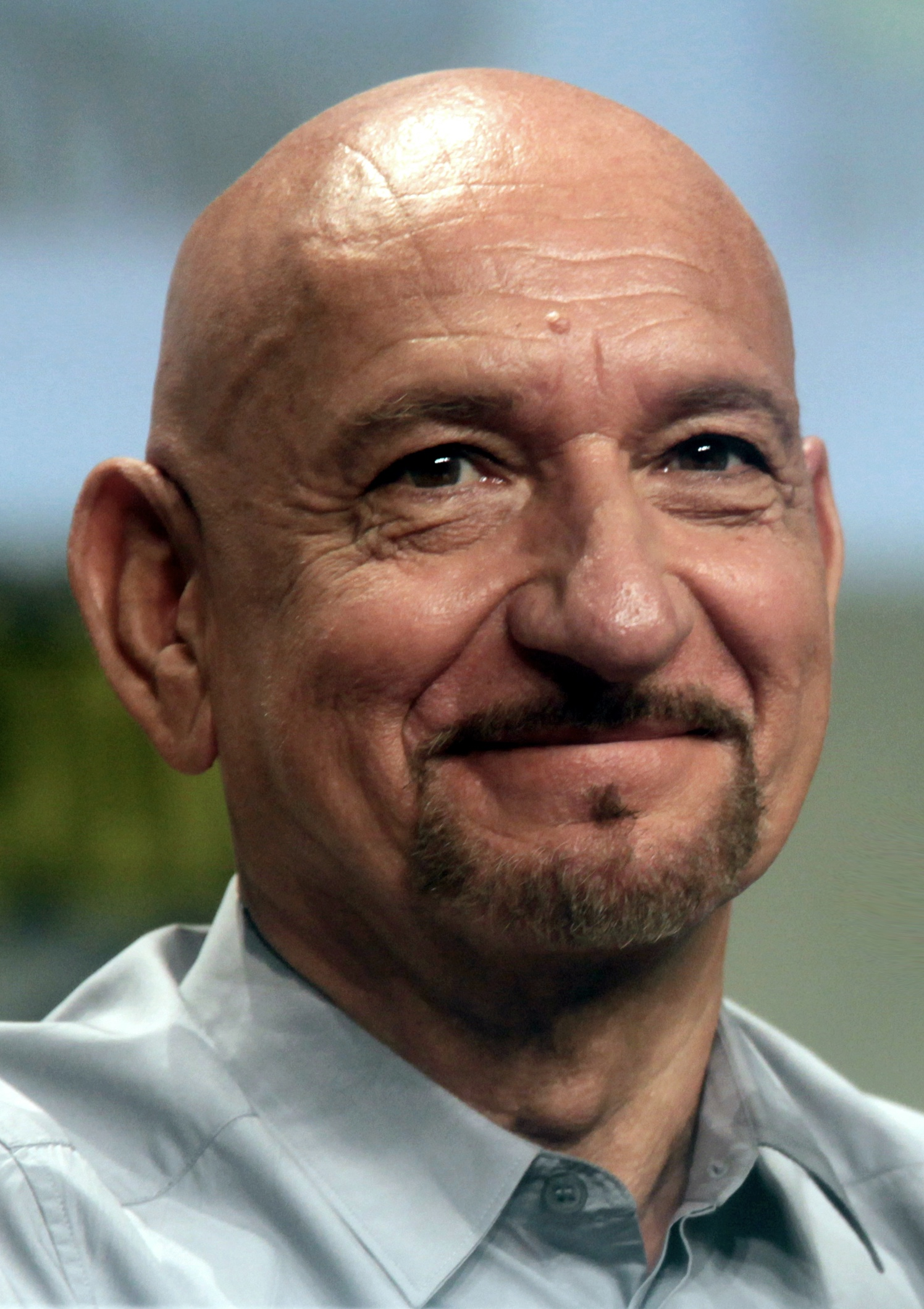
Ben Kingsley won for his role in Sexy Beast in 2001.

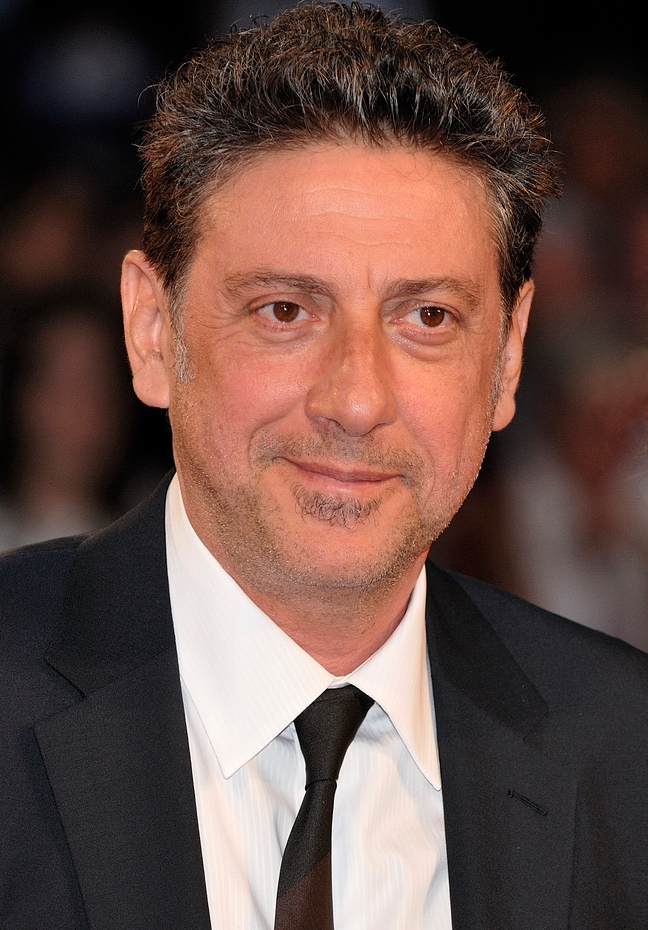
Sergio Castellitto won for his roles in Mostly Martha and My Mother's Smile in 2002.

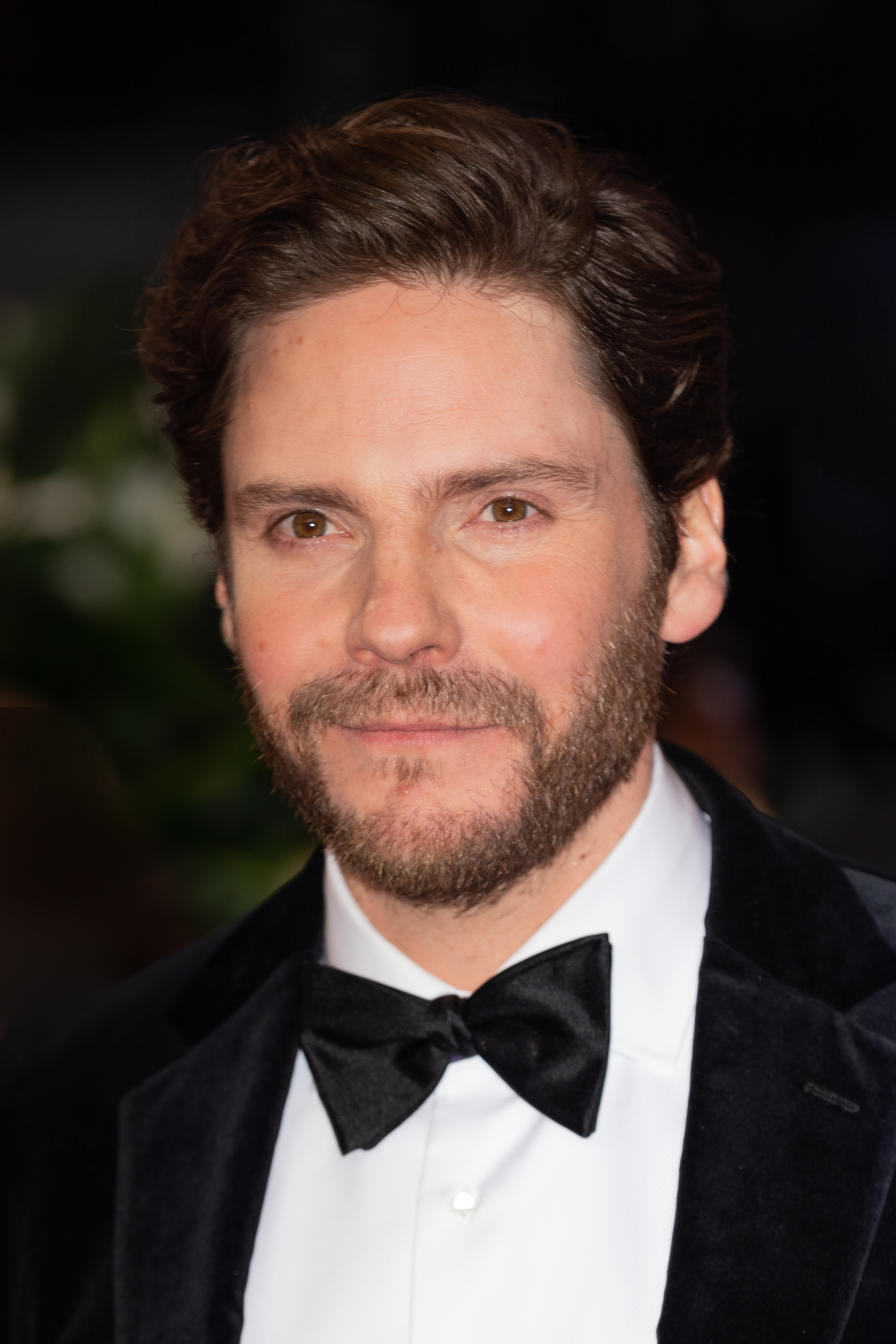
Daniel Brühl won for his role in Good Bye Lenin! in 2003.

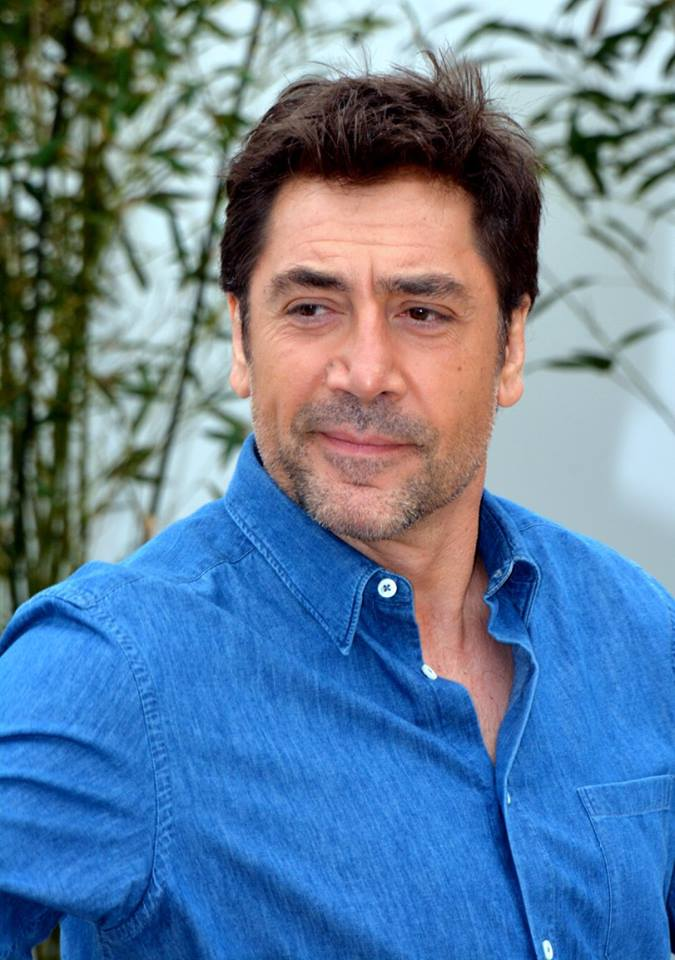
Javier Bardem won for his role in The Sea Inside in 2004.

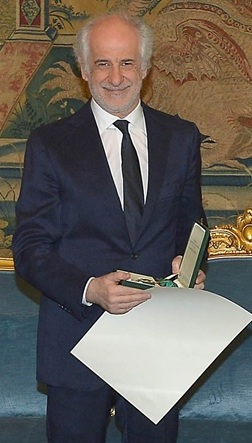
Toni Servillo has won twice for his roles in Il Divo and Gomorra (2008) and The Great Beauty (2013).

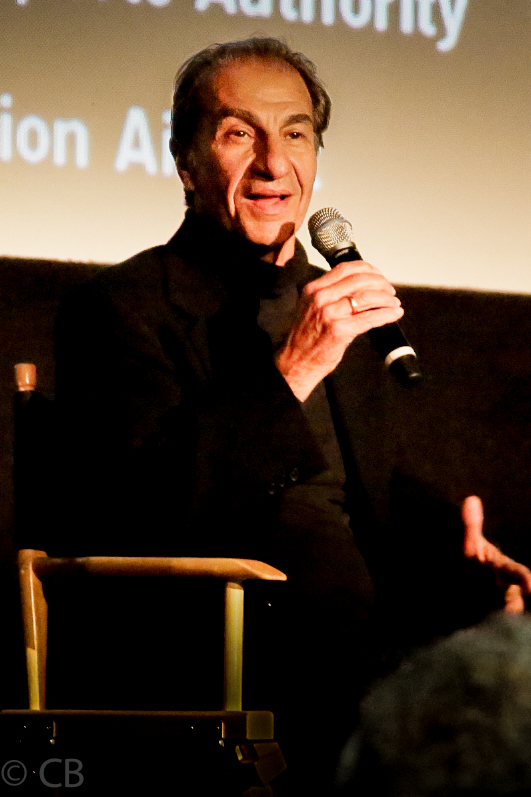
Sasson Gabai won for his role in The Band's Visit in 2007.

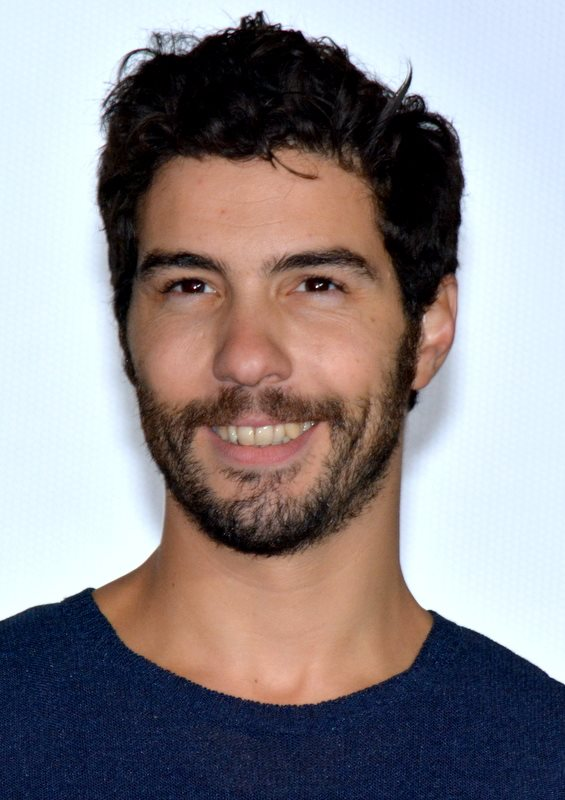
Tahar Rahim won for his role in A Prophet in 2009.

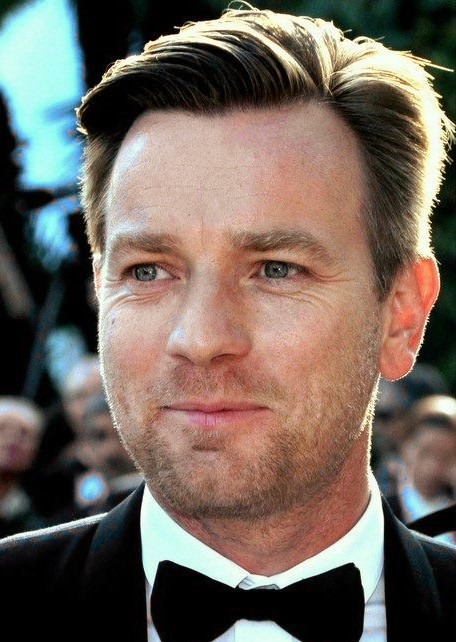
Ewan McGregor won for his role in The Ghost Writer in 2010.

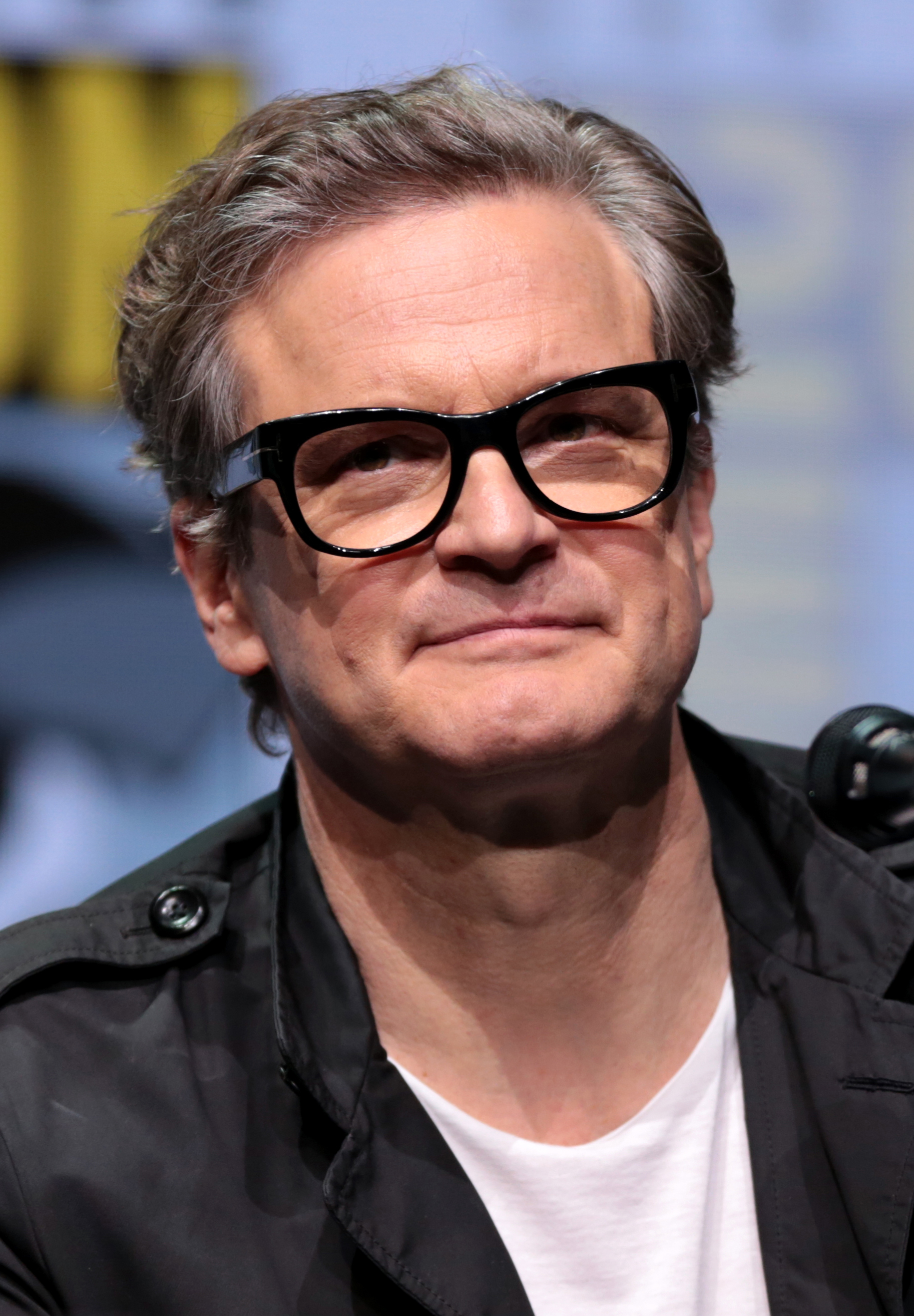
Colin Firth won for his role in The King's Speech in 2011.

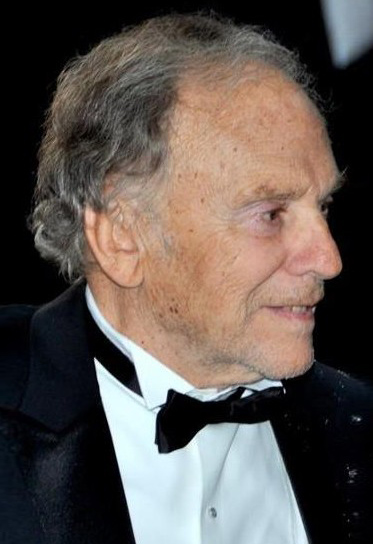
Jean-Louis Trintignant won for his role in Amour in 2012.

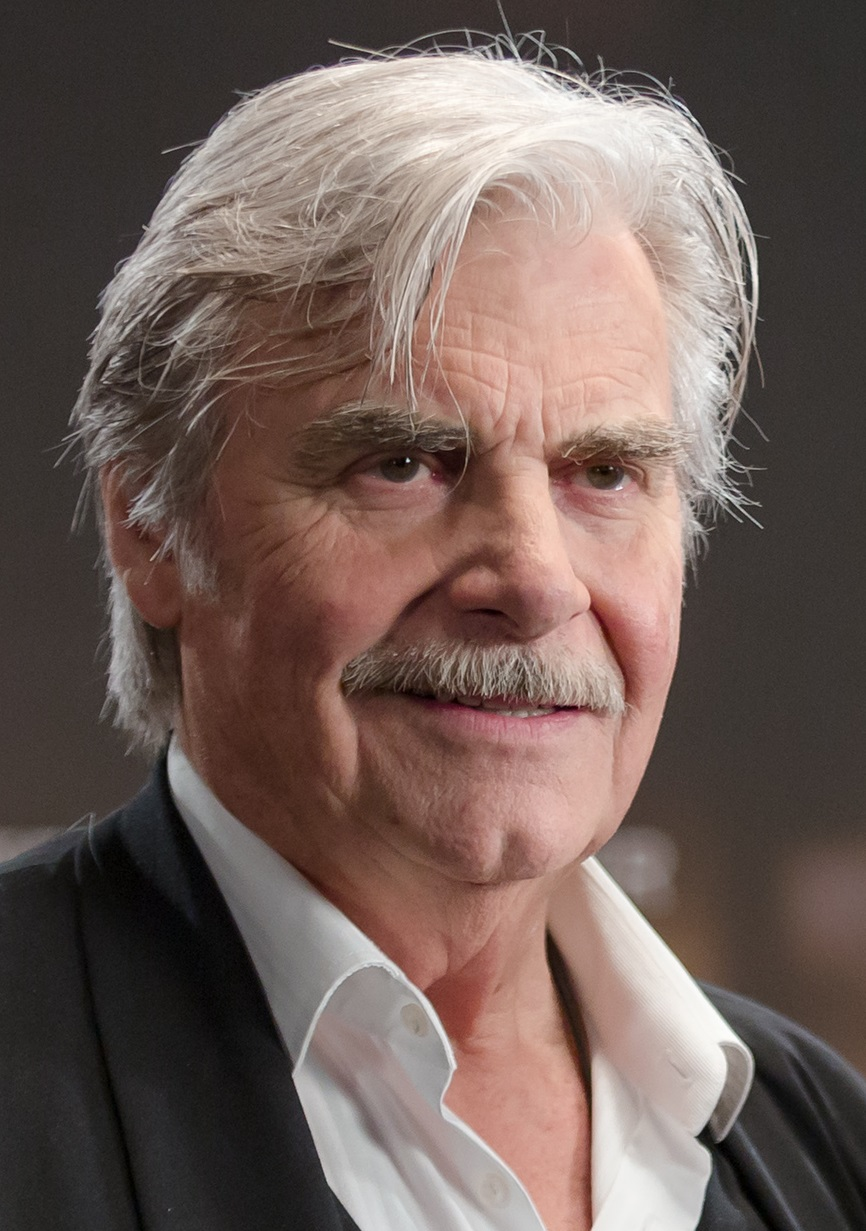
Peter Simonischek won for his role in Toni Erdmann in 2016.

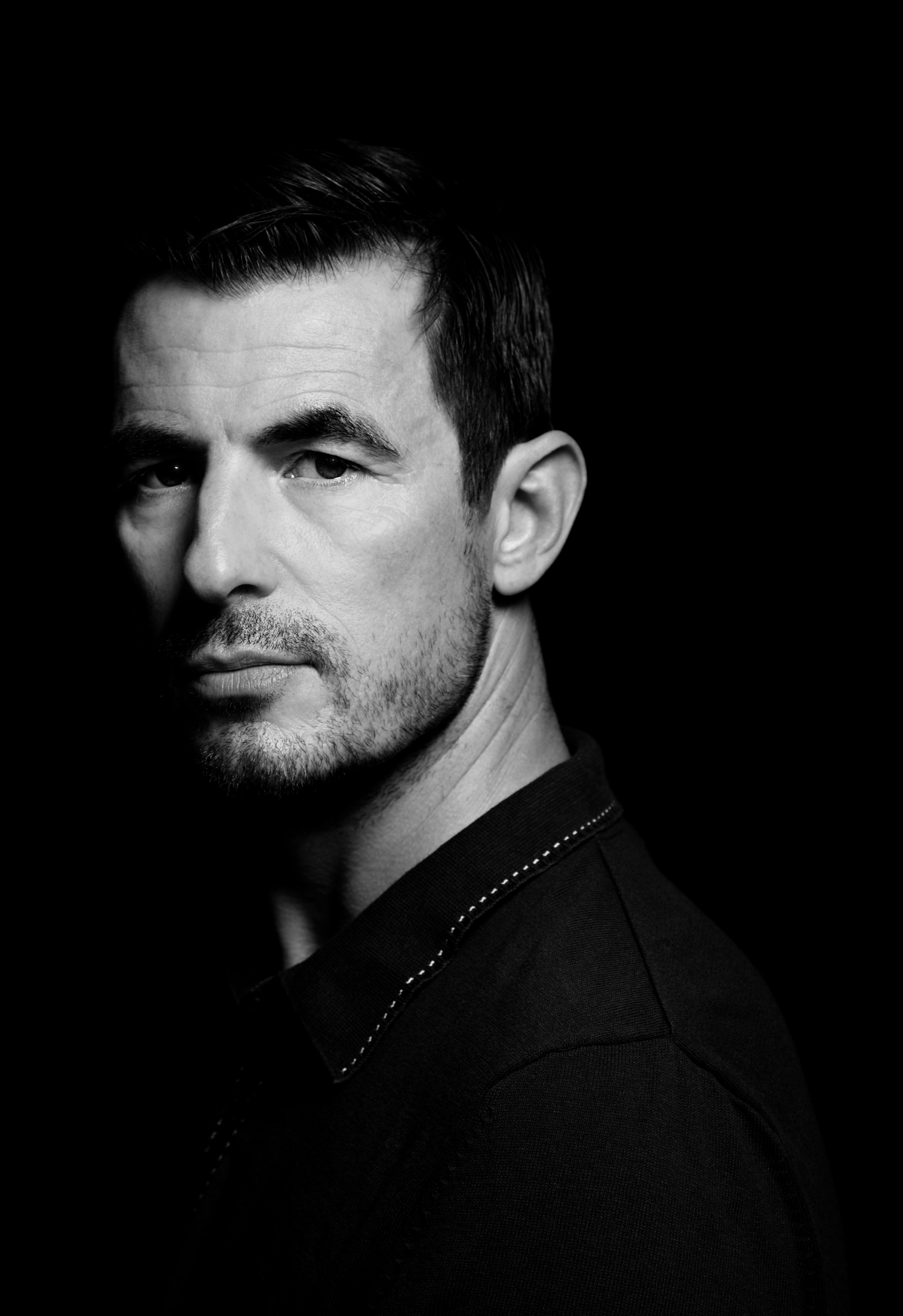
Claes Bang won for his role in The Square in 2017.

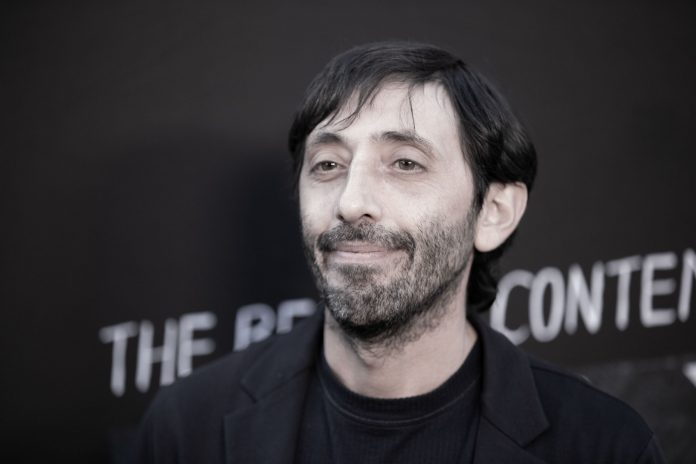
Marcello Fonte won for his role in Dogman in 2018.

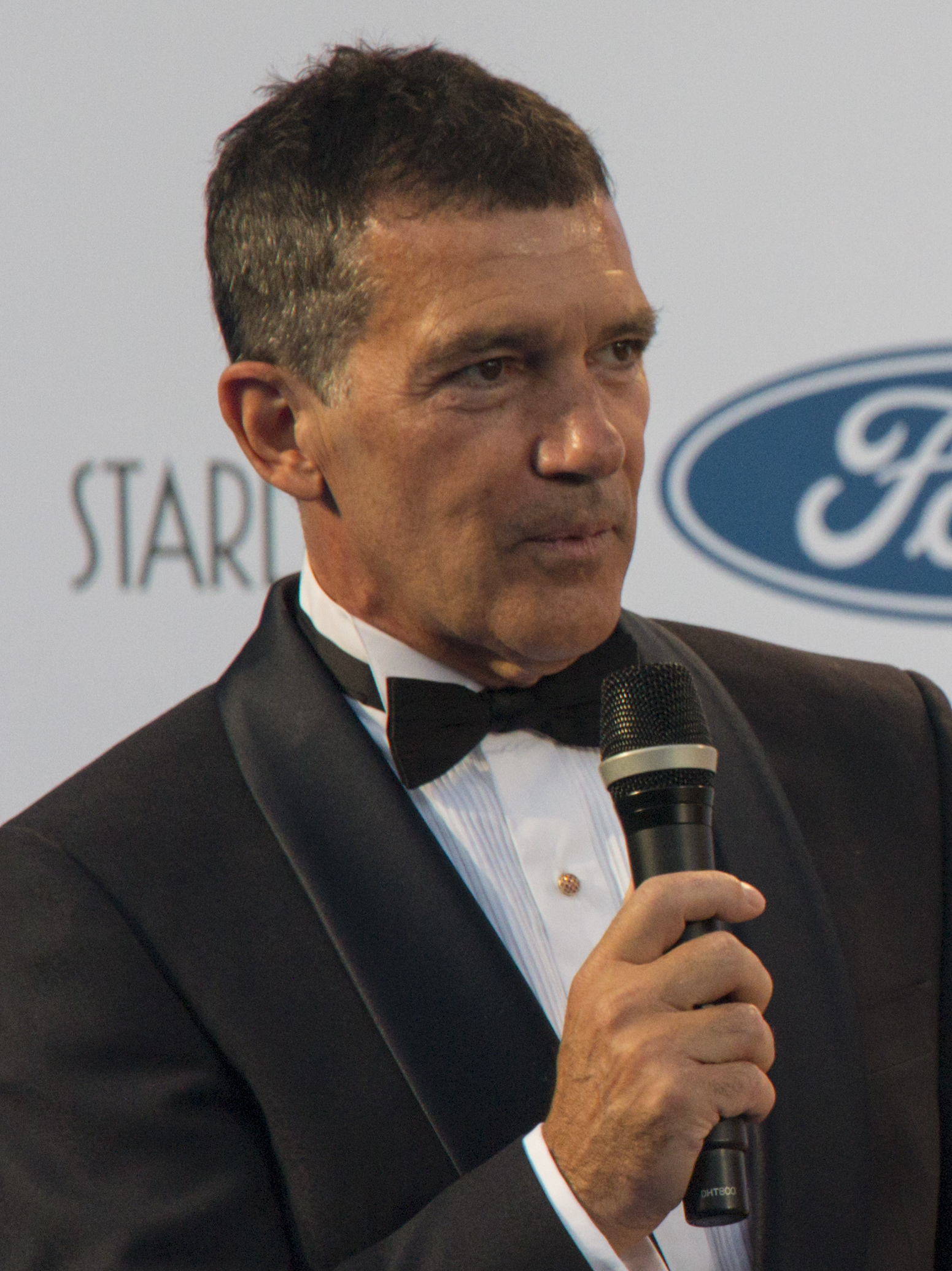
Antonio Banderas won for his role in Pain and Glory in 2019.

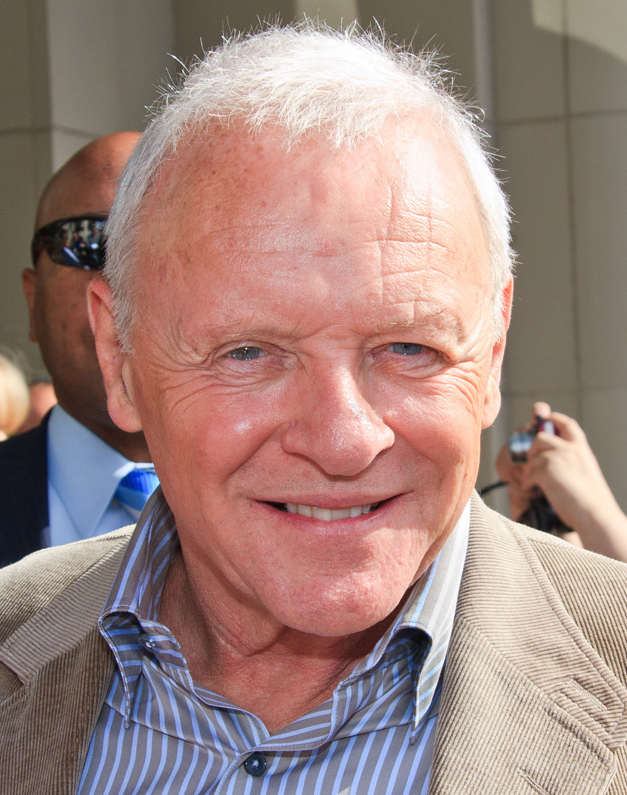
Anthony Hopkins won for his role in The Father in 2021.

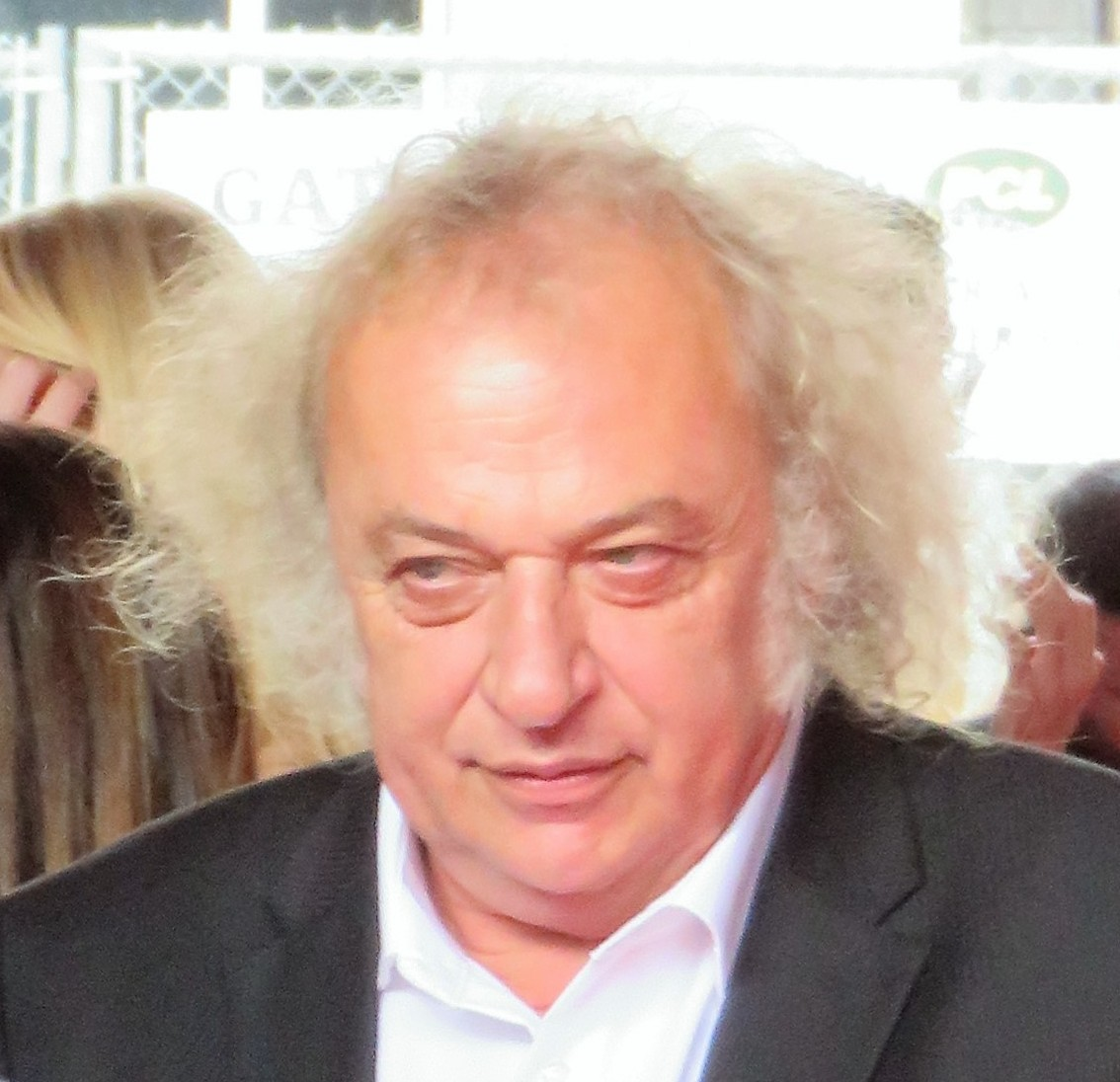
Zlatko Burić won for his role in Triangle of Sadness in 2022.

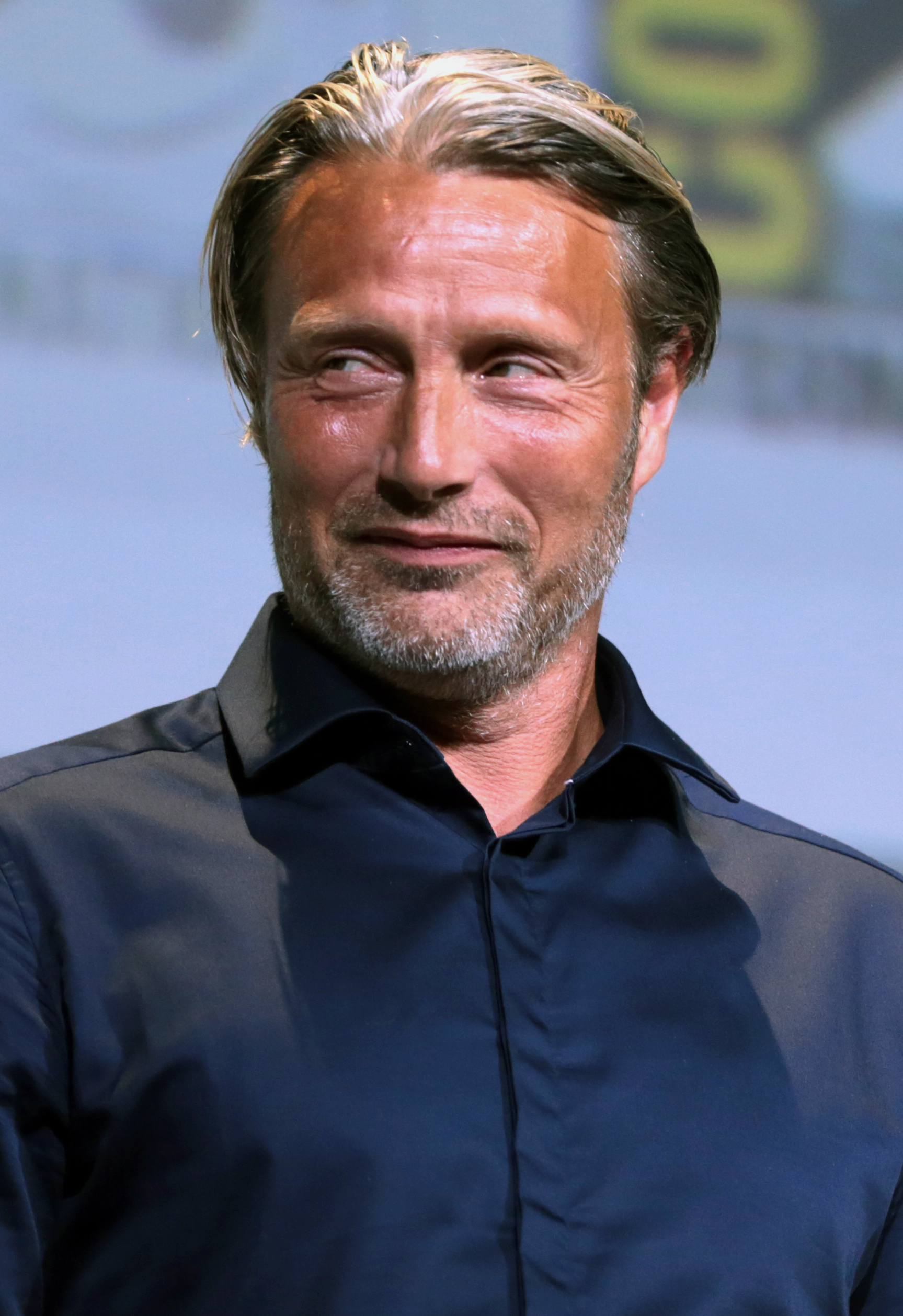
Mads Mikkelsen won for his role in The Promised Land in 2023.

=== 1980s ===
Year	Winner and nominees	English title	Original title	Character
1988 (1st)	Max von Sydow	Pelle the Conqueror	Pelle erobreren	Lassefar "Lasse" Karlsson
1988 (1st)	Klaus Maria Brandauer	Hanussen		Klaus Schneider / Erik Jan Hanussen
1988 (1st)	Alfredo Landa	El bosque animado		Malvís / Bandid Fendetestas
1988 (1st)	Udo Samel	Mit meinen heißen Tränen		Franz Schubert
1988 (1st)	Dorel Vişan	Iacob		Iacob
1989 (2nd)	Philippe Noiret	Life and Nothing But; Cinema Paradiso	La vie et rien d'autre Nuovo cinema Paradiso	Commandant Delaplane; Alfredo
1989 (2nd)	Daniel Day-Lewis	My Left Foot		Christy Brown
1989 (2nd)	Davor Dujmović	Time of the Gypsies	Dom za vesanje	Perhan
1989 (2nd)	Károly Eperjes	Eldorádó		Sándor Monori
1989 (2nd)	Jozef Króner	Thou, Which Art in Heaven	Ti, koyto si na nebeto	Georg Henih

=== 1990s ===
Year	Winner and nominees	English title	Original title	Character
1990 (3rd)	Kenneth Branagh	Henry V		King Henry V of England
1990 (3rd)	Gérard Depardieu	Cyrano de Bergerac		Cyrano de Bergerac
1990 (3rd)	Philip Zandén	Skyddsängeln		Jacob
1991 (4th)	Michel Bouquet	Toto the Hero	Toto le héros	Thomas
1991 (4th)	Claudio Amendola	Ultrà		Principe
1991 (4th)	Richard Anconina	Le Petit Criminel		Gérard
1992 (5th)	Matti Pellonpää	La Vie de Bohème		Rodolfo
1992 (5th)	Denis Lavant	The Lovers on the Bridge	Les Amants du Pont-Neuf	Alex
1992 (5th)	Enrico Lo Verso	The Stolen Children	Il ladro di bambini	Antonio
1993 (6th)	Daniel Auteuil	Un cœur en hiver		Stéphane
1993 (6th)	Carlo Cecchi	Morte di un matematico napoletano		Renato Caccioppoli
1993 (6th)	Jan Decleir	Daens		Adolf Daens
1994 (7th)	No award given			
1995 (8th)	No award given			
1996 (9th)	Ian McKellen	Richard III		Richard III of England
1997 (10th)	Bob Hoskins	Twenty Four Seven		Alan Darcy
1997 (10th)	Mario Adorf	Rossini		Paolo Rossini
1997 (10th)	Jerzy Stuhr	Love Stories	Historie miłosne	The university teacher / The priest / Col. Jerzy Matałowski / Prisoner Zdzisław Filip / Petent
1997 (10th)	Philippe Torreton	Captain Conan	Capitaine Conan	Conan
1998 (11th)	Roberto Benigni	Life Is Beautiful	La vita è bella	Guido Orefice
1998 (11th)	Javier Bardem	Live Flesh	Carne trémula	David
1998 (11th)	Peter Mullan	My Name Is Joe		Joe Kavanagh
1998 (11th)	Ulrich Thomsen	The Celebration	Festen	Christian Klingenfeldt-Hansen
1999 (12th)	Ralph Fiennes	Sunshine		Ignatz Sonnenschein (Sors) / Adam Sors / Ivan Sors
1999 (12th)	Anders W. Berthelsen	Mifune's Last Song	Mifunes sidste sang	Kresten
1999 (12th)	Rupert Everett	An Ideal Husband		Lord Arthur Goring
1999 (12th)	Götz George	After the Truth	Nichts als die Wahrheit	Josef Mengele
1999 (12th)	Philippe Torreton	Ça commence aujourd'hui		Daniel Lefebvre
1999 (12th)	Ray Winstone	The War Zone		Dad

=== 2000s ===
Year	Winner and nominees	English title	Original title	Character
2000 (13th)	Sergi López	Harry, He's Here to Help	Harry, un ami qui vous veut du bien	Harry
2000 (13th)	Jamie Bell	Billy Elliot		Billy Elliot
2000 (13th)	Bruno Ganz	Bread and Tulips	Pane e tulipani	Fernando Girasole
2000 (13th)	Ingvar Eggert Sigurðsson	Angels of the Universe	Englar alheimsins	Páll
2000 (13th)	Krzysztof Siwczyk	Wojaczek		Rafal Wojaczek
2000 (13th)	Stellan Skarsgård	Aberdeen		Tomas Heller
2001 (14th)	Ben Kingsley	Sexy Beast		Don Logan
2001 (14th)	Jesper Christensen	The Bench	Bænken	Kaj
2001 (14th)	Branko Đurić	No Man's Land		Čiki
2001 (14th)	Michael Caine; Tom Courtenay; David Hemmings; Bob Hoskins; Ray Winstone (Cast of Last Orders)	Last Orders		Jack Dodds; Vic Tucker; Lenny; Ray Johnson; Vince Dodds
2001 (14th)	Michel Piccoli	I'm Going Home	Je rentre à la maison	Gilbert Valence
2001 (14th)	Stellan Skarsgård	Taking Sides		Wilhelm Furtwängler
2002 (15th)	Sergio Castellitto	Mostly Martha; My Mother's Smile	Bella Martha; L'ora di religione (Il sorriso di mia madre)	Mario; Ernesto Picciafuocco
2002 (15th)	Javier Bardem	Mondays in the Sun	Los lunes al sol	Santa
2002 (15th)	Javier Cámara	Talk to Her	Hable con ella	Benigno Martín
2002 (15th)	Martin Compston	Sweet Sixteen		Liam
2002 (15th)	Olivier Gourmet	The Son	Le fils	Olivier
2002 (15th)	Markku Peltola	The Man Without a Past	Mies vailla menneisyyttä	M
2002 (15th)	Timothy Spall	All or Nothing		Phil
2003 (16th)	Daniel Brühl	Good Bye Lenin!		Alexander "Alex" Kerner
2003 (16th)	Chiwetel Ejiofor	Dirty Pretty Things		Okwe/Olatokumbo Fadipe
2003 (16th)	Tómas Lemarquis	Noi the Albino	Nói albinói	Nói
2003 (16th)	Luigi Lo Cascio	The Best of Youth	La meglio gioventù	Nicola Carati
2003 (16th)	Jean Rochefort	The Man on the Train	L'homme du train	Monsieur Manesquier
2003 (16th)	Bruno Todeschini	His Brother	Son frère	Thomas
2004 (17th)	Javier Bardem	The Sea Inside	Mar adentro	Ramón Sampedro
2004 (17th)	Daniel Brühl	The Edukators	Die fetten Jahre sind vorbei	Jan
2004 (17th)	Bruno Ganz	Downfall	Der Untergang	Adolf Hitler
2004 (17th)	Gérard Jugnot	The Chorus	Les choristes	Clement Mathieu
2004 (17th)	Bogdan Stupka	Our Own	Svoi	Ivan Blinov
2004 (17th)	Birol Ünel	Head-On	Gegen die Wand	Cahit Tomruk
2005 (18th)	Daniel Auteuil	Hidden	Caché	Georges Laurent
2005 (18th)	Romain Duris	The Beat That My Heart Skipped	De battre mon cœur s'est arrêté	Thomas Seyr
2005 (18th)	Henry Hübchen	Go for Zucker	Alles auf Zucker!	Jakob "Jaeckie Zucker" Zuckermann
2005 (18th)	Ulrich Matthes	The Ninth Day	Der neunte Tag	Henri Kremer
2005 (18th)	Jérémie Renier	The Child	L'enfant	Bruno
2005 (18th)	Ulrich Thomsen	Brothers	Brødre	Michael
2006 (19th)	Ulrich Mühe	The Lives of Others	Das Leben der Anderen	Hauptmann Gerd Wiesler
2006 (19th)	Patrick Chesnais	Not Here to Be Loved	Je ne suis pas là pour être aimé	Jean-Claude Delsart
2006 (19th)	Jesper Christensen	Manslaughter	Drabet	Carsten
2006 (19th)	Mads Mikkelsen	After the Wedding	Efter brylluppet	Jacob Petersen
2006 (19th)	Cillian Murphy	The Wind That Shakes the Barley		Damien O'Donovan
2006 (19th)	Cillian Murphy	Breakfast on Pluto		Patrick/Patricia "Kitten" Braden
2006 (19th)	Silvio Orlando	The Caiman	Il caimano	Bruno Bonomo
2007 (20th)	Sasson Gabai	The Band's Visit	Bikur Ha-Tizmoret	Lieutenant-colonel Tawfiq Zacharya
2007 (20th)	Elio Germano	My Brother is an Only Child	Mio fratello è figlio unico	Accio Benassi
2007 (20th)	Miki Manojlović	Irina Palm		Miklos
2007 (20th)	James McAvoy	The Last King of Scotland		Dr. Nicholas Garrigan
2007 (20th)	Michel Piccoli	Belle Toujours		Henri Husson
2007 (20th)	Ben Whishaw	Perfume: The Story of a Murderer		Jean-Baptiste Grenouille
2008 (21st)	Toni Servillo	Il Divo; Gomorra		Giulio Andreotti; Franco
2008 (21st)	Michael Fassbender	Hunger		Bobby Sands
2008 (21st)	Thure Lindhardt; Mads Mikkelsen	Flame & Citron	Flammen & Citronen	Bent Faurschou-Hviid / Flammen; Jørgen Haagen Schmith / Citronen
2008 (21st)	James McAvoy	Atonement		Robbie Turner
2008 (21st)	Jürgen Vogel	The Wave	Die Welle	Rainer Wenger
2008 (21st)	Elmar Wepper	Cherry Blossoms	Kirschbluten - Hanami	Rudi Angermeier
2009 (22nd)	Tahar Rahim	A Prophet	Un prophète	Malik El-Djebena
2009 (22nd)	Moritz Bleibtreu	The Baader Meinhof Complex	Der Baader Meinhof Komplex	Andreas Baader
2009 (22nd)	Steve Evets	Looking for Eric		Eric Bishop
2009 (22nd)	David Kross	The Reader		Michael Berg
2009 (22nd)	Dev Patel	Slumdog Millionaire		Jamal Malik
2009 (22nd)	Filippo Timi	Vincere		Benito Mussolini and Benito Albino Mussolini

=== 2010s ===
Year	Winner and nominees	English title	Original title	Character
2010 (23rd)	Ewan McGregor	The Ghost Writer		The Ghost
2010 (23rd)	Jakob Cedergren	Submarino		Nick
2010 (23rd)	Elio Germano	Our Life	La nostra vita	Claudio
2010 (23rd)	George Piştereanu	If I Want to Whistle, I Whistle	Eu când vreau să fluier, fluier	Silviu
2010 (23rd)	Luis Tosar	Cell 211	Celda 211	Malamadre
2011 (24th)	Colin Firth	The King's Speech		King George VI
2011 (24th)	Jean Dujardin	The Artist		George Valentin
2011 (24th)	Mikael Persbrandt	In a Better World	Hævnen	Anton
2011 (24th)	Michel Piccoli	We Have a Pope	Habemus Papam	Cardinal Melville/The Pope
2011 (24th)	André Wilms	Le Havre		Marcel Marx
2012 (25th)	Jean-Louis Trintignant	Amour		Georges Laurent
2012 (25th)	François Cluzet; Omar Sy	The Intouchables	Intouchables	Philippe; Driss Bassary
2012 (25th)	Michael Fassbender	Shame		Brandon Sullivan
2012 (25th)	Mads Mikkelsen	The Hunt	Jagten	Lucas
2012 (25th)	Gary Oldman	Tinker Tailor Soldier Spy		George Smiley/"Beggarman"
2013 (26th)	Toni Servillo	The Great Beauty	La grande belleza	Jep Gambardella
2013 (26th)	Jude Law	Anna Karenina		Alexei Alexandrovich Karenin
2013 (26th)	Johan Heldenbergh	The Broken Circle Breakdown		Didier Bontinck
2013 (26th)	Fabrice Luchini	In the House	Dans la maison	Germain Germain
2013 (26th)	Tom Schilling	A Coffee in Berlin	Oh Boy!	Niko Fischer
2014 (27th)	Timothy Spall	Mr. Turner		Joseph Mallord William Turner
2014 (27th)	Brendan Gleeson	Calvary		Father James
2014 (27th)	Tom Hardy	Locke		Ivan Locke
2014 (27th)	Aleksei Serebryakov	Leviathan	Левиафан	Kolya Sergeyev
2014 (27th)	Stellan Skarsgård	Nymphomaniac		Seligman
2015 (28th)	Michael Caine	Youth	Youth - La giovinezza	Fred Ballinger
2015 (28th)	Tom Courtenay	45 Years		Geoff Mercer
2015 (28th)	Colin Farrell	The Lobster		David
2015 (28th)	Christian Friedel	13 Minutes	Elser - Er hätte die Welt verändert	Georg Elser
2015 (28th)	Vincent Lindon	The Measure of a Man	La Loi du marché	Thierry Taugourdeau
2016 (29th)	Peter Simonischek	Toni Erdmann		Winfried Conradi / Toni Erdmann
2016 (29th)	Javier Cámara	Truman		Tomás
2016 (29th)	Hugh Grant	Florence Foster Jenkins		St. Clair Bayfield
2016 (29th)	Dave Johns	I, Daniel Blake		Daniel Blake
2016 (29th)	Burghart Klaußner	The People vs. Fritz Bauer	Der Staat gegen Fritz Bauer	Fritz Bauer
2016 (29th)	Rolf Lassgård	A Man Called Ove	En man som heter Ove	Ove
2017 (30th)	Claes Bang	The Square		Christian
2017 (30th)	Nahuel Pérez Biscayart	BPM (Beats per Minute)	120 battements par minute	Sean Dalmazo
2017 (30th)	Colin Farrell	The Killing of a Sacred Deer		Steven Murphy
2017 (30th)	Josef Hader	Stefan Zweig: Farewell to Europe	Vor der Morgenröte	Stefan Zweig
2017 (30th)	Jean-Louis Trintignant	Happy End		Georges Laurent
2018 (31st)	Marcello Fonte	Dogman		Marcello
2018 (31st)	Jakob Cedergren	The Guilty	Den skyldige	Asger Holm
2018 (31st)	Rupert Everett	The Happy Prince		Oscar Wilde
2018 (31st)	Sverrir Gudnason	Borg vs McEnroe	Borg	Björn Borg
2018 (31st)	Tomasz Kot	Cold War	Zimna wojna	Wiktor Warski
2018 (31st)	Victor Polster	Girl		Lara
2019 (32nd)	Antonio Banderas	Pain and Glory	Dolor y gloria	Salvador Mallo
2019 (32nd)	Jean Dujardin	An Officer and a Spy	J'accuse	Picquart
2019 (32nd)	Pierfrancesco Favino	The Traitor	Il traditore	Tommaso Buscetta
2019 (32nd)	Levan Gelbakhiani	And Then We Danced		Merab
2019 (32nd)	Alexander Scheer	Gundermann		Gerhard Gundermann
2019 (32nd)	Ingvar E. Sigurdsson	A White, White Day	Hvítur, Hvítur Dagur	Ingimundur

=== 2020s ===
Year	Winner and nominees	English title	Original title	Character
2020 (33rd)	Mads Mikkelsen	Another Round	Druk	Martin
2020 (33rd)	Bartosz Bielenia	Corpus Christi	Boże Ciało	Daniel
2020 (33rd)	Goran Bogdan	Father	Otac	Nikola
2020 (33rd)	Elio Germano	Hidden Away	Volevo nascondermi	Antonio Ligabue
2020 (33rd)	Luca Marinelli	Martin Eden		Martin Eden
2020 (33rd)	Viggo Mortensen	Falling		John Petersen
2021 (34th)	Anthony Hopkins	The Father		Anthony
2021 (34th)	Yura Borisov	Compartment No. 6	Hytti nro 6 / Купе номер шесть	Vadim
2021 (34th)	Vincent Lindon	Titane		Vincent
2021 (34th)	Tahar Rahim	The Mauritanian		Mohamedou Ould Slahi
2021 (34th)	Franz Rogowski	Great Freedom	Große Freiheit	Hans Hoffmann
2022 (35th)	Zlatko Burić	Triangle of Sadness		Dmitry
2022 (35th)	Elliott Crosset Hove	Godland		Lucas
2022 (35th)	Eden Dambrine	Close		Léo
2022 (35th)	Pierfrancesco Favino	Nostalgia		Felice Lasco
2022 (35th)	Paul Mescal	Aftersun		Calum
2023 (36th)	Mads Mikkelsen	The Promised Land		Ludvig Kahlen
2023 (36th)	Christian Friedel	The Zone of Interest		Rudolf Höss
2023 (36th)	Josh O'Connor	La chimera		Arthur
2023 (36th)	Thomas Schubert	Afire		Leon
2023 (36th)	Jussi Vatanen	Fallen Leaves		Holappa
2024 (37th)	Abou Sangaré	Souleymane's Story	L'Histoire de Souleymane	Souleymane
2024 (37th)	Daniel Craig	Queer		William Lee
2024 (37th)	Lars Eidinger	Dying	Sterben	Tom Lunies
2024 (37th)	Ralph Fiennes	Conclave		Thomas Cardinal Lawrence
2024 (37th)	Franz Rogowski	Bird		Bird
2025 (38th)	Stellan Skarsgård	Sentimental Value	Affeksjonsverdi	Gustav Borg
2025 (38th)	Sergi López	Sirāt		Luis
2025 (38th)	Mads Mikkelsen	The Last Viking	Den sidste viking	John
2025 (38th)	Toni Servillo	La grazia		Mariano De Santis
2025 (38th)	Idan Weiss	Franz		Franz Kafka
2026 (39th)	Swann Arlaud	A Man of His Time	Notre Salut	Henri Marre
2026 (39th)	Javier Bardem	The Beloved	El ser querido	Esteban Martínez
2026 (39th)	Andrew Scott	Elsinore		Ian Charleson
2026 (39th)	Sebastian Stan	Fjord		Mihai Gheorghiu
2026 (39th)	Hanns Zischler	Fatherland		Thomas Mann

== Multiple wins and nominations ==
=== Multiple wins ===
Wins	Actor
2	Daniel Auteuil
2	Mads Mikkelsen
2	Toni Servillo

=== Most nominations ===
Nominations	Actor
6	Mads Mikkelsen
4	Stellan Skarsgård
4	Javier Bardem
3	Elio Germano
3	Michel Piccoli
3	Toni Servillo
2	Daniel Auteuil
2	Daniel Brühl
2	Michael Caine
2	Javier Cámara
2	Jakob Cedergren
2	Jesper Christensen
2	Tom Courtenay
2	Jean Dujardin
2	Rupert Everett
2	Colin Farrell
2	Michael Fassbender
2	Pierfrancesco Favino
2	Ralph Fiennes
2	Bruno Ganz
2	Bob Hoskins
2	Vincent Lindon
2	Sergi López
2	James McAvoy
2	Cillian Murphy
2	Tahar Rahim
2	Franz Rogowski
2	Ingvar Eggert Sigurðsson
2	Timothy Spall
2	Ulrich Thomsen
2	Philippe Torreton
2	Jean-Louis Trintignant
2	Ray Winstone

== See also ==
- BAFTA Award for Best Actor in a Leading Role
- British Independent Film Award for Best Performance by an Actor in a British Independent Film
- César Award for Best Actor
- David di Donatello for Best Actor
- Goya Award for Best Actor
- Polish Academy Award for Best Actor
- Robert Award for Best Actor in a Leading Role
