= 13th European Film Awards =

2000 film awards ceremony in France

The 13th European Film Awards
- Date: 2 December 2000
- Location: Paris, France
- Presented by: European Film Academy

The 13th European Film Awards were given on 2 December 2000 in Paris, France.

== Winners and nominees ==
=== Best European Actor ===
(Spain) Sergi López – Harry, He's Here to Help (Harry un ami qui vous veut du bien)

- (United Kingdom) Jamie Bell – Billy Elliot
- (Switzerland) Bruno Ganz – Bread and Tulips (Pane e tulipani)
- (Iceland) Ingvar Eggert Sigurðsson – Angels of the Universe (Englar alheimsins)
- (Poland) Krzysztof Siwczyk – Wojaczek
- (Sweden) Stellan Skarsgård – Aberdeen

=== Best European Actress ===
(Iceland) Björk – Dancer in the Dark

- (Germany) Bibiana Beglau – The Legend of Rita (Die Stille nach dem Schuß)
- (Sweden) Lena Endre – Faithless (Trolösa)
- (France) Sylvie Testud – The Captive (La captive)
- (United Kingdom) Julie Walters – Billy Elliot

=== Best European Cinematographer ===
(Italy) Vittorio Storaro – Goya in Bordeaux (Goya en Burdeos)

- Aleksandr Burov – The Wedding (Свадебка)
- (France) Agnès Godard – Good Work (Beau travail)
- Éric Guichard and Jean-Paul Meurisse – Himalaya (Himalaya – l'enfance d'un chef)
- (Ukraine) Yuri Klimenko – The Barracks (Барак)
- Edgar Moura – Jaime

=== Best European Film ===
English title	Original title	Director(s)	Country
Dancer in the Dark		Lars von Trier	Denmark
Billy Elliot	—N/a	Stephen Daldry	United Kingdom
Chicken Run	—N/a	Peter Lord, Nick Park	United Kingdom
Harry, He's Here to Help	Harry, un ami qui vous veut du bien	Dominik Moll	France
The Taste of Others	Le Goût des autres	Agnès Jaoui	France
Bread and Tulips	Pane e tulipani	Silvio Soldini	Italy
Faithless	Trolösa	Liv Ullmann	Sweden

=== Best European Screenwriter ===
Agnès Jaoui and Jean-Pierre Bacri – The Taste of Others (Le goût des autres)

- Rafael Azcona – Butterfly (La lengua de las mariposas)
- Wolfgang Kohlhaase
- Maria Svereva and Nana Djordjadze – 27 Missing Kisses (27 dakarguli kotsna)
- Doriana Leondeff and Silvio Soldini – Bread and Tulips (Pane e tulipani)
- Dominik Moll and Gilles Marchand – Harry, He's Here to Help (Harry un ami qui vous veut du bien)

=== Best Documentary ===
Year	English title	Original title	Director(s)	Country
2000 (12th)
2000 (12th)	The Gleaners and I	Les glaneurs et la glaneuse	Agnès Varda	France
2000 (12th)	Calle 54		Fernando Trueba	Spain
2000 (12th)	Gulag	Goulag	Iossif Pasternak, Hélène Châtelain	France
2000 (12th)	Home Game	Heimspiel	Pepe Danquart	Germany
2000 (12th)	One Day in September±	–	Kevin Macdonald	United Kingdom
2000 (12th)	Working Women of the World	Ouvrières du monde	Marie-France Collard	France
