= Ćpaj Stajl =

Polish musical collective based in Kraków

Ćpaj Stajl are a musical collective based in Kraków co-created by Kony and Cool P (also known as Pesh, Alick and his birth name Aleksander Kwaśniewski, the son of guitarist Rafał Kwaśniewski). Their first recordings were released in 2013. In 2025, their album Białe szaleństwo earned a Fryderyki nomination for the best hip-hop album of the year. Their music has been characterized as a combination of rap, electronics and experimental sounds. They have collaborated with artists such as Kaz Bałagane, Kukon, Pikers, Zdechły Osa, Hałastra, Wini and Młody Dzban. Kony and Cool P. co-created soundtrack for the 2023 film Freestyle.

== Discography ==
- Lato W Ghettcie (2018)
- Melodramat (2019)
- Złoty Strzał (2022)
- Białe szaleństwo (2024)
- Melina (2025)
