= Ti, koyto si na nebeto =

1990 Bulgarian film

Ти, който си на небето Thou, Who Art in Heaven
- Directed by: Viktor Paskov; Docho Bodzhakov
- Written by: Viktor Paskov
- Starring: Jozef Kroner; Lyuben Chatalov
- Release date: 22 January 1990
- Running time: 102 minutes
- Country: Bulgaria
- Language: Bulgarian

Thou, Who Art in Heaven (Bulgarian: Ти, който си на небето, Ti, koyto si na nebeto) is a 1990 Bulgarian film directed by Viktor Paskov and Docho Bodzhakov. The film's lead actor Jozef Kroner was nominated for European Film Award for Best Actor.

== Cast ==
- Jozef Kroner as Geprg Henih
- Boyan Kovachev as Viktor
- Lyuben Chatalov as Viktor's father

== Synopsis ==
А dying man reveals to his young friend, a child of 8, the fairy world of music.

== Awards ==
- European Film Award for Best Actor - Jozef Kroner (nominated)
