= Zdechły Osa =

Musician (born 1997)

- Also known as: Zdechły Osa, formerly also known as Młody Osa
- Born: Daniel Wójtowicz; 25 April 1997 (age 29); Wrocław
- Genres: Rap, hardcore hip hop, trap, emo rap
- Occupations: Lyricist, performer
- Years active: since 2014
- Label: Warner Music Group

Zdechły Osa (born Daniel Wójtowicz; 25 April 1997 in Wrocław) is a Polish singer and lyricist, creating spoken word performances in a style bordering on new age and several other music genres (rap, hardcore hip hop, trap, emo rap).

He is associated with Wrocław (the Gądów estate, called "the cosmonauts' estate" or "cosmos" by Wrocław residents, which often appears in his work). Critics link him with the poetics of Arthur Rimbaud, Rafał Wojaczek, and the works of the band Dezerter.

He received three nominations to Fryderyki.

== Discography ==
=== LPs ===
- Sprzedałem dupe (2021)
- Breslau Hardcore (2023)
- Trash Tape (2025)

=== EPs ===
- young_typical_jesus (2016)
- Stage_diving (2016)
- poznaj osę (2018)
- 123 (2018)
- And Destroy (2018)
- HELLONLINE (2019)
