= Géza Bereményi =

Hungarian writer, lyricist, screenwriter, playwriter, theater/film director (born 1946)

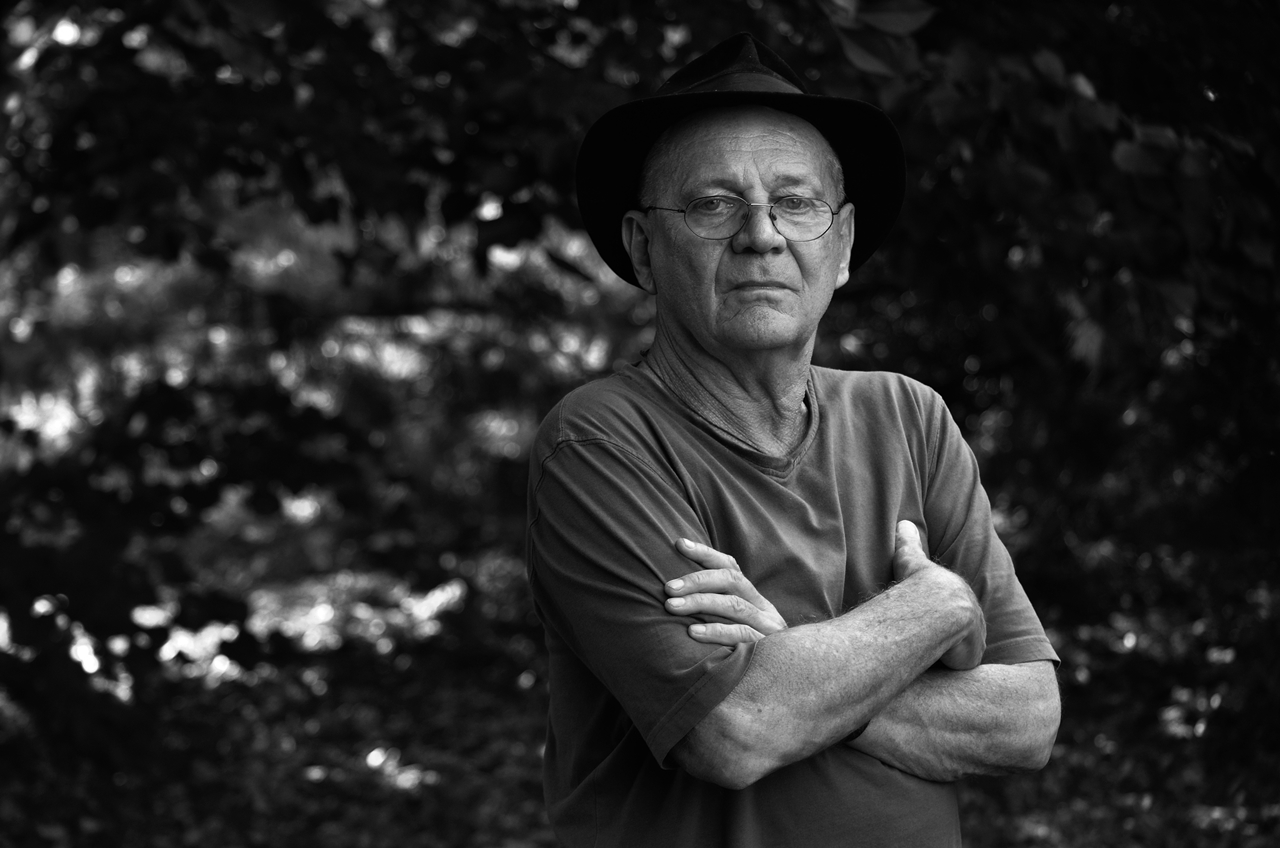
- Born: Géza Vetró; 25 January 1946 (age 80); Budapest, Hungary
- Years active: 1972-present
- Spouses: Tünde Hámos (1999-present) (2 children); Eszter Balás (1976-1999) (divorced) (1 child); Udvarnoki Edit (1970-1972) (divorced) (1 child); Szász-Bogdán Gyöngyvér (?-1976) (divorced)

Géza Sándor Bereményi (born 25 January 1946) is a Hungarian writer, play- and screenwriter, lyricist, film- and theatre director. He was awarded Best European Director for his film Eldorado at the 2nd European Film Awards.

== Biography ==
Born Géza Sándor Vetró in Budapest, Hungary. He studied Hungarian and Italian Literature and Linguistics at Eötvös Loránd University in Budapest, graduating in 1970. His first job was at the marketing department of a publishing house in Budapest, which he held for a few years; then he got a job translating films and fitting the text to the movement of actors' lips for dubbing. He worked on the Hungarian version of The Graduate among many others. He quit in 1978 to become a freelance writer.

In the seventies he began publishing short stories and novels. He also wrote plays and screenplays. Among his first performed plays were Poremba (1976, Stúdió K Theatre), Légköbméter (1978, Pest Theatre) and Halmi (1979).

His best known realized film script is Time Stands Still (1981, directed by Péter Gothár). He started working as a film director in the eighties. His biggest success was Eldorado (Midas Touch).

In 1995, he joined Szigligeti Theatre in Szolnok as a director and playwright. Between 1997 and 2006, he was artistic director of Hevesi Sándor Theatre in Zalaegerszeg. Between 2012 and 2017, he ran Thália Theatre in Budapest; he has been artistic advisor there since 2017.

He is a member of The Hungarian Academy of Arts.
