= Rafał Wojaczek =

Polish poet

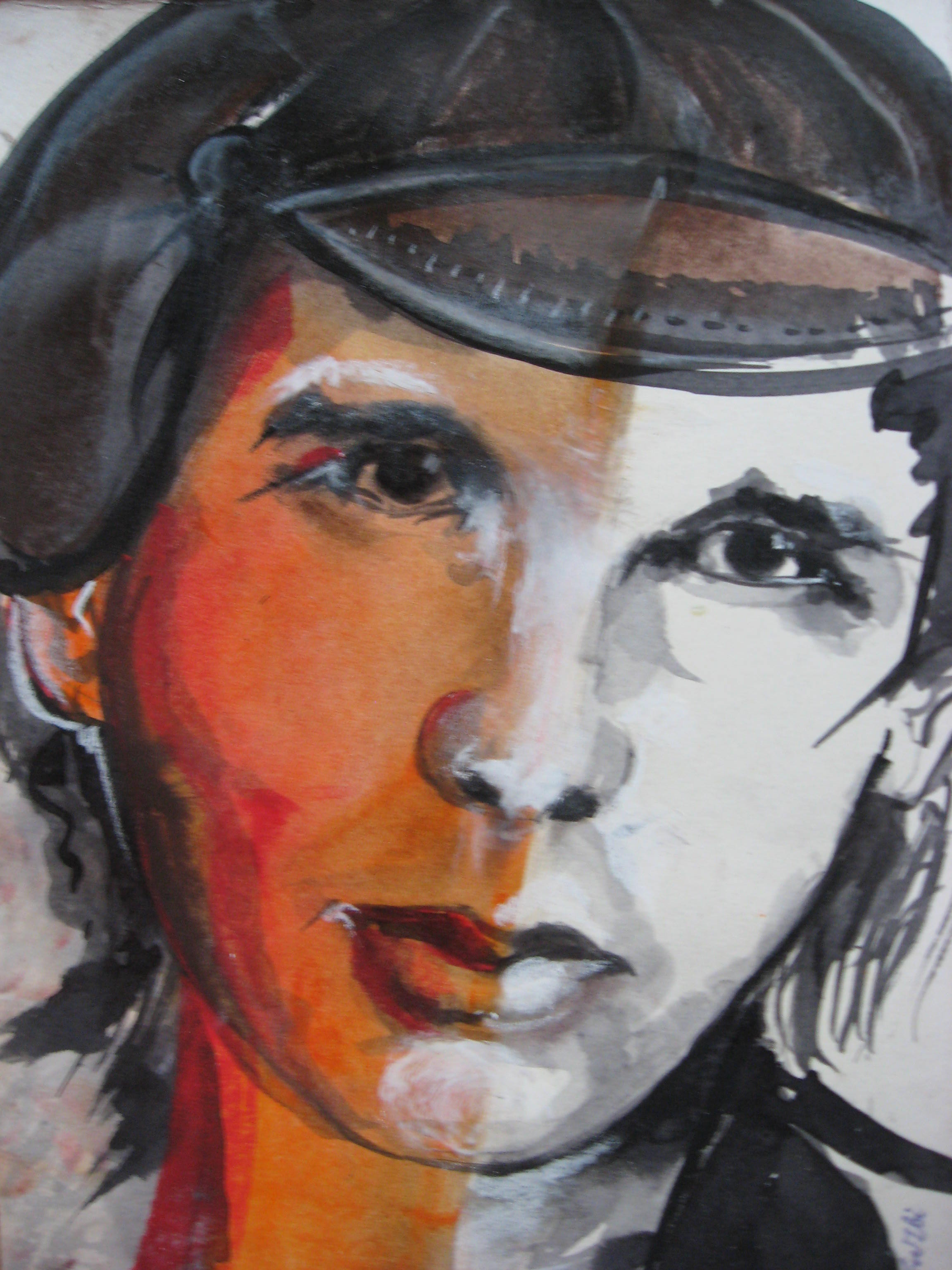
- Portrait of Wojaczek by Zbigniew Kresowaty
- Born: December 6, 1945; Mikołów, Silesian Voivodeship, Republic of Poland
- Died: May 11, 1971 (aged 25); Wrocław, Polish People's Republic
- Cause of death: Suicide
- Education: Jagiellonian University
- Writing career
- Years active: 1965 - 1971
- Genre: Confessional poetry

Rafał Wojaczek (December 6, 1945 – May 11, 1971) was a Polish poet of the postwar generation. He was a son of a respected family in Upper Silesia. His life was marked by abortive studies, alcoholism, depression and suicide attempts, the last one of which was successful. His short career took place during the turbulent years of modern Poland when the younger generation began to realize that they were trapped in a mendacious political system. Other Polish poets and writers with comparable biographies include Edward Stachura, Marek Hłasko and Tadeusz Borowski.

== Work ==
Wojaczek's work translates the political and practical circumstances of life in Poland into universal and existential terms. His lyrical subject is often preoccupied with the brutality of the physical body along with its suffering and pleasures. By placing the physicality and sexuality of the individual in the context of the practical and political he achieves a depth of erotic and existential expression. His work has been compared by some to that of Lautréamont and Rimbaud, but was strongly connected with international trends of his time, particularly confessional poetry and the Beats. His earlier work was chiefly what Robert Lowell would have referred to as "raw," but his late style became well "cooked," with increasing attention to structure and subtle rhyme schemes using for example assonance between related (but not identical) Polish vowels, with no loss of emotional intensity.

Wojaczek debuted with seven poems in the very first issue of the poetry journal Poezja (December 1965). Individual volumes of poetry include:

- Sezon (Season), 1969
- Inna bajka (Another Tale), 1970
- Nie skończona krucjata (Unfinished Crusade), 1972
- Którego nie było (Who Was Not), 1972

Wojaczek's collected works were published by PIW in 1999 and in a more complete Zebra edition in 2005.

== In popular culture ==
The 1999 Polish film Wojaczek is his biopic, and loosely based on his life and works. Actor Krzysztof Siwczyk played his role and was consequently nominated for a European Film Award for Best Actor.

== See also ==
- Polish poets
