= Eldorado (1988 film) =

- Directed by: Géza Bereményi
- Written by: Géza Bereményi
- Starring: Károly Eperjes
- Cinematography: Sándor Kardos
- Music by: Ferenc Darvas
- Release date: 1988
- Language: Hungarian

Eldorado (Hungarian: Eldorádó, also known as The Midas Touch) is a 1988 Hungarian drama film written and directed by Géza Bereményi.

The film was entered into the main competition at the 45th edition of the Venice Film Festival. For this film Bereményi won the European Film Award for Best Director at the 2nd European Film Awards.

== Plot ==
The story takes place in the urban districts of Pest focusing on the marketplace on Teleki square (which was still existing mostly unchanged when the movie was made) from after the end of World War II in 1945 until the Hungarian Revolution of 1956. The main character is the head of the black market in Budapest. He thinks he can buy everyone and everything but at the end he must face that he can't buy life. The movie contains some archive footage of the events in the revolution.

== Cast ==
- Károly Eperjes as Sándor Monori
- Judit Pogány as Mrs. Monori
- Enikő Eszenyi as Marika Monori
- Barnabás Tóth as Imi Valkó
