= Wojaczek (film) =

- Directed by: Lech Majewski
- Starring: Krzysztof Siwczyk; Dominika Ostalowska
- Cinematography: Adam Sikora
- Release date: 1999
- Country: Poland
- Language: Polish

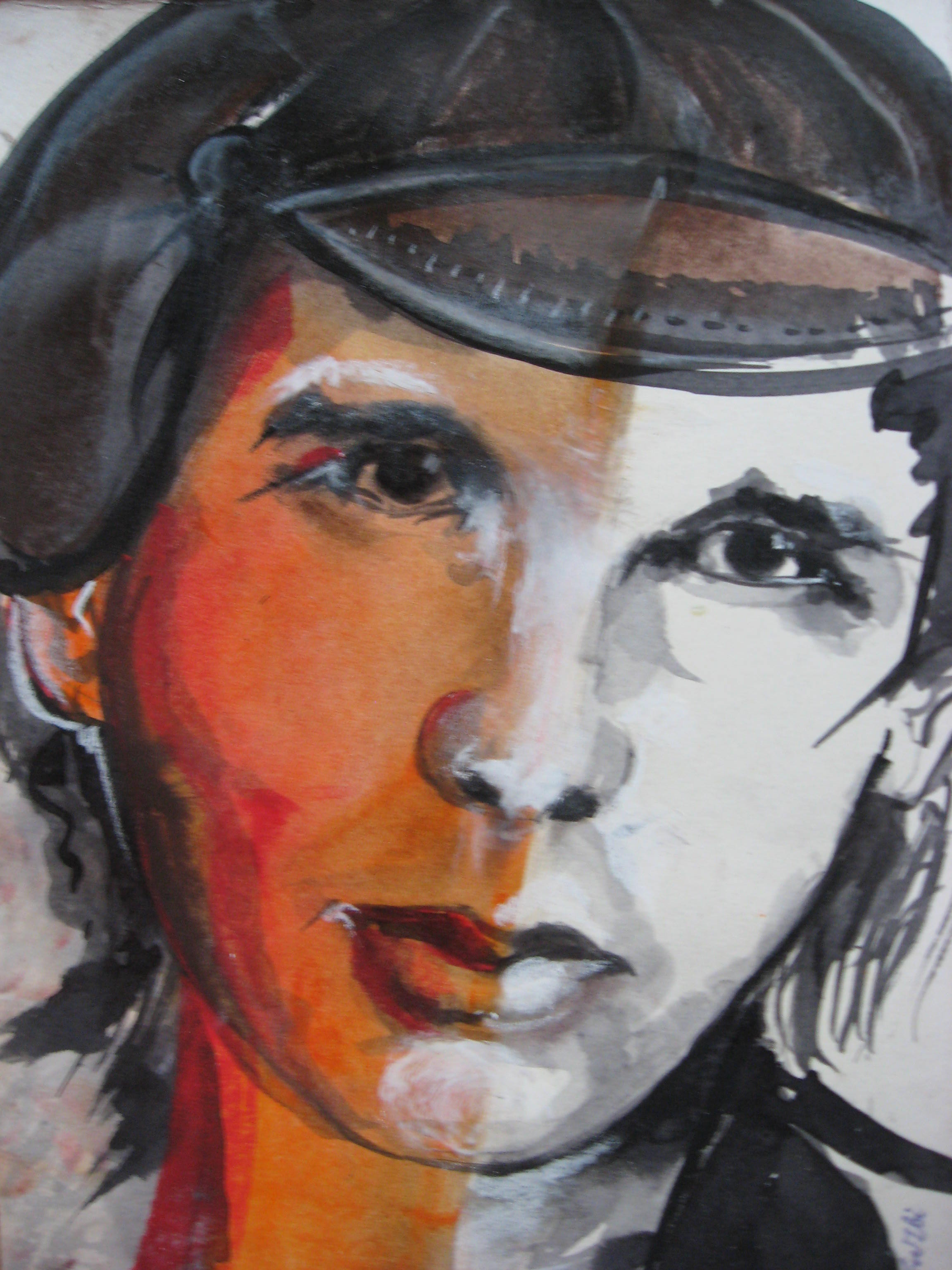
Rafał Wojaczek (1945-1971)

Wojaczek is a 1999 Polish film directed by Lech Majewski and starring Krzysztof Siwczyk in the title role. It is the biopic of rebellious Polish poet Rafał Wojaczek. The film's lead actor Krzysztof Siwczyk was nominated for European Film Award for Best Actor.

== Synopsis ==
The film depicts the life of Polish poet Rafał Wojaczek.

== Cast ==
- Krzysztof Siwczyk as Rafał Wojaczek
- Dominika Ostalowska as Mała

== Awards ==
- European Film Award for Best Actor - Krzysztof Siwczyk (nominated)
