= Viktor Paskov =

Viktor Marinov Paskov (Bulgarian: Виктор Маринов Пасков; 10 September 1949 – 16 April 2009) was a Bulgarian writer, musician, musicologist and screenwriter.

== Biography ==
Paskov was born in the capital Sofia and finished high school in the city. He graduated from what is today the Felix Mendelssohn College of Music and Theatre in Leipzig, East Germany in 1976 and was part of several jazz bands. Viktor Paskov was in Germany as a composer, opera singer and critician until 1980, when he became literature and music editor with the Sofia Press publishing house, a position he held until 1987. In 1987, Paskov joined the Boyana Film Studio as an editor and screenwriter.

The years from 1990 to 1992 Paskov spent in Paris, France. He also worked as director of the Bulgarian Cultural Centre in Berlin from 2002 to 2004. Paskov died from lung cancer in Bern, Switzerland, aged 59. He was buried in the Central Sofia Cemetery.

Paskov's early poems were published in the Rodna rech magazine in 1964. His first book Nevrastni ubiystva (Juvenile Murders) was released in 1986. Viktor Paskov has also written five other books and four screenplays.

His second and probably best known book, Balada za Georg Henih (A Ballad for Georg Henig), published in 1987, won the foreign literature award at the Bordeaux book exhibition. In the novella set in 1950s Sofia, the quasi-autobiographical character Viktor tells the story of an elderly Czech emigre, master luthier Georg Henig. Destitute and lonely, rejected by his Bulgarian former apprentices but embraced by Viktor's family, the skilled violin maker passes on to young Viktor the values of art, faith and love, virtues severely lacking in the financially and culturally impoverished Sofia neighborhood in the early years of communism.
