= Krzysztof Siwczyk =

Polish poet and actor (born 1977)

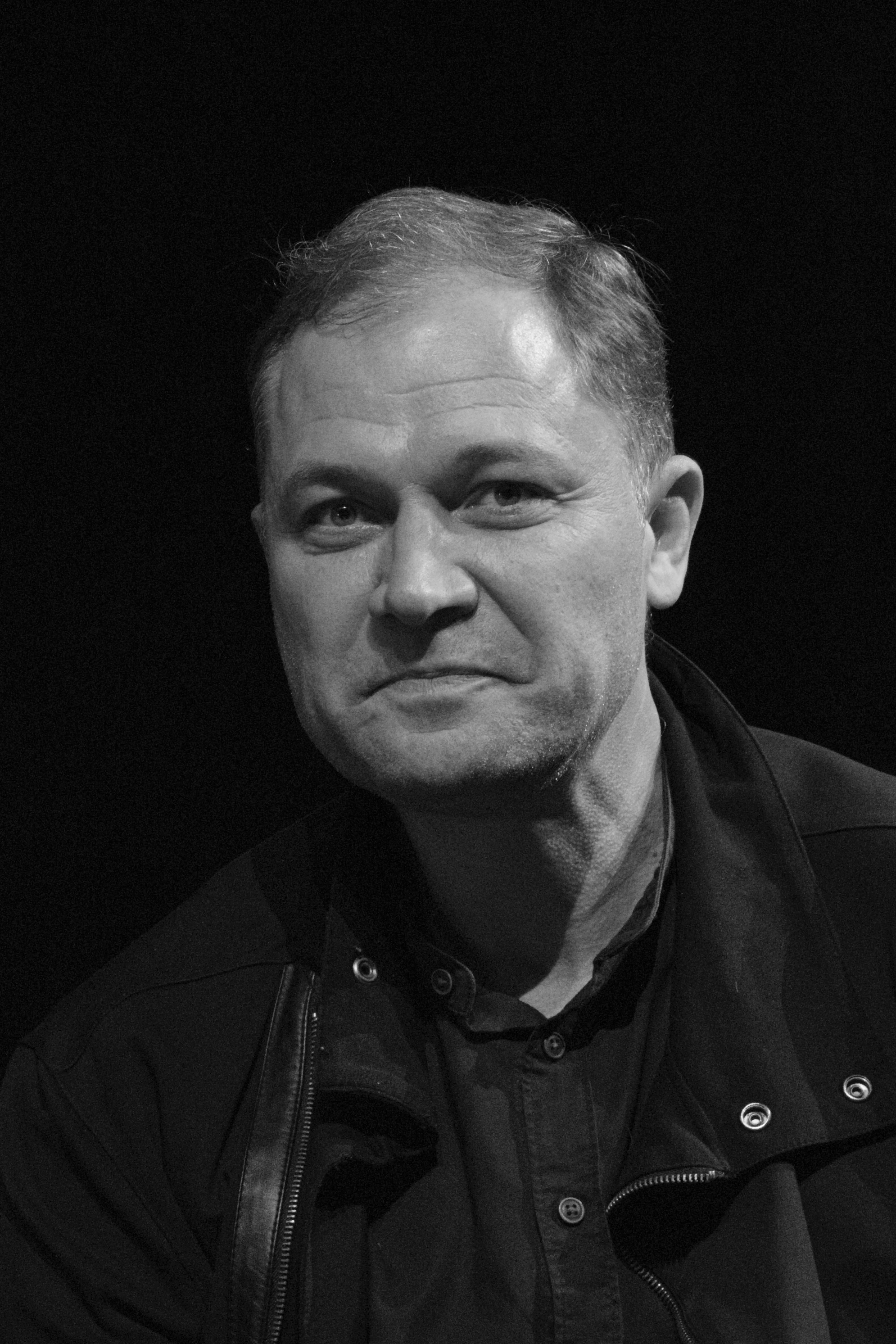
- Krzysztof Siwczyk, 2025
- Born: 1977 (age 48–49)
- Citizenship: Polish
- Occupations: Poet, actor, literary critic, essayist
- Awards: Kościelski Award (2014), Gdynia Literary Prize (2017), Wrocław Silesius Poetry Award (2022)

Krzysztof Siwczyk (born 1977) is a Polish poet, actor, literary critic and essayist. He was nominated for European Film Award for Best Actor his role in the film Wojaczek in 2000.

== Biography ==
The son of the engineer Edward Siwczyk and the teacher Stefania, née Nicz. He studied political science, cultural studies and philosophy at the University of Silesia (UŚ) in Gliwice; he did not graduate from any of the subjects. He joined the Polish Writers Association (SPP) in 2001. He joined the Polish PEN Club in 2012. In 2014, he became programme director of the Miłosz Festival in Kraków. In August 2020 he left the Polish Writers Association (SPP). He married in 2005 and has a daughter, Nina (born 2014).

== Literary work ==
He made his debut in Czas Kultury in 1995. Then he published several poetry books like Dzikie dzieci (1995), "Emil i my" (1999), Dane dni (2001), Wiersze dla palących (2001).

== Filmography ==
- Wojaczek (2000) as Rafał Wojaczek
- Bluesmani (2000)
- Wydalony (2010)

== Poetry books ==
- Dzikie dzieci. Stowarzyszenie Pisarzy Polskich Oddział w Łodzi. 1995.
- Emil i my. Wydawnictwo Czarne. 1999.
- Dane dni. Biuro Literackie. 2001.
- Wiersze dla palących. Instytut Mikołowski. 2001.
- Zdania z treścią. Biuro Literackie. 2003.
- W państwie środka. Biuro Literackie. 2005.
- List otwarty. Wiersze zebrane 1995-2005. Biuro Literackie. 2006.
- Centrum likwidacji szkód. Biuro Literackie. 2008.
- Koncentrat. Wojewódzka Biblioteka Publiczna i Centrum Animacji Kultury w Poznaniu. 2010.
- Gdzie indziej jest teraz. Wojewódzka Biblioteka Publiczna i Centrum Animacji Kultury w Poznaniu. 2011. Selection of poems.
- Gody. Wojewódzka Biblioteka Publiczna i Centrum Animacji Kultury w Poznaniu. 2012.
- Dokąd bądź. Wydawnictwo a5. 2014.
- Jasnopis. Wydawnictwo a5. 2016.
- Mediany. Wydawnictwo a5. 2018.
- Osobnikt. Wydawnictwo a5. 2020.
- Krematoria I / Krematoria II. Wydawnictwo Austeria. 2021.
- Krematoria III. Wydawnictwo Austeria. 2022.
- Ludzie z taksydermii. Wydawnictwo Literackie. 2024.

== Literary criticism, essays and prose books ==
- Ulotne obiekty ataku. Instytut Mikołowski. 2010.
- Kinkiety w piekle. Instytut Mikołowski. 2012.
- Koło miejsca / Elementarz. Czytelnia Sztuki. 2016.
- Bezduch. Wydawnictwo Austeria. 2018.
- Manuał. Felietony i szkice z lat 2013–2019. Wojewódzka Biblioteka Publiczna i Centrum Animacji Kultury w Poznaniu. 2020.
- Sygnał w zenicie. Wydawnictwo Austeria. 2022.
- Manuał II. Felietony, szkice, portrety z lat 2020–2022. Wojewódzka Biblioteka Publiczna i Centrum Animacji Kultury w Poznaniu. 2024.
- Na przecięciu arterii. Biuro Literackie. 2024.

== Awards and nominations ==
- laureate of "Czas Kultury" (1995)
- Laureate of the Jacek Bierezin National Poetry Competition for the volume Dzikie dzieci (1995)
- Laureate of the Culture Foundation (1999)
- Audience Award in the category of Best Acting (Wojaczek, 1999) at the National Film Festival Prowincjonalia (2000)
- Nominated for the European Film Award for Best Actor (Wojaczek, 1999) by the European Film Academy (2000)
- Laureate of the Książka Wiosny (Book of the Spring) title of the Poznański Przegląd Nowości Wydawniczych (2003)
- Nomination for the Wroclaw Silesius Poetry Award for the volume Koncentrat (2011)
- Laureate of the Kościelski Award (2014)
- Nomination for the Wroclaw Silesius Poetry Award for the volume Dokąd bądź (2015)
- Gdynia Literary Prize in the essay category for Koło miejsca (2017)
- Nomination to the Wroclaw Silesius Poetry Award for the volume "Mediany" (2019)
- Nomination for the Wisława Szymborska Award for the volume Krematoria (2022)
- Wroclaw Silesius Poetry Award for the volume Krematoria (2022)
