= Károly Eperjes =

Hungarian actor

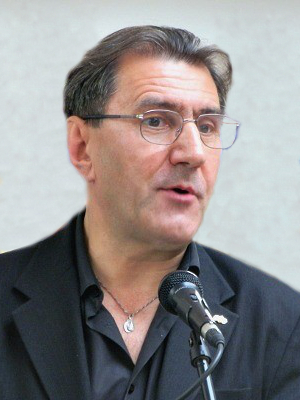
- Born: 17 February 1954 (age 72); Hegykő, Hungary
- Occupation: Actor
- Years active: 1979-present
- Spouse: Erzsébet Balogh
- Children: Krisztián; Borbála

Károly Eperjes (born 17 February 1954 in Hegykő) is a Kossuth Prize winner Hungarian stage and film actor, member of the National Theatre in Budapest. Eperjes appeared in more than fifty films since 1982.

== Selected filmography ==
Film
Year	Title	Role	Notes
2012	The Door	Tibor	
2011	Adventure	Dr. Szekeres	
2006	Relatives	Soma Kardics	
1999	6:3 Play It Again Tutti	Tutti	
1992	Csapd le csacsi!		
1990	Good Evening, Mr. Wallenberg	László Szamosi	
1989	Laurin		
1988	Hanussen	Captain Tibor Nowotny	
1988	Eldorádó	Sándor Monori	
1985	Colonel Redl	Lieutenant Jaromil Schorm	
1983	Tight Quarters	Csaba	

== Awards ==
- Jászai Mari Prize (1986)
- Kossuth Prize (1999)
- Honorary Citizen of Budapest (2011)
- Order of Merit of Hungary – Officer's Cross (2017)
