= European Film Award for Best Documentary =

Award for documentary films

European Film Award Prix Arte
- Awarded for: Best Documentary
- Presented by: European Film Academy
- First award: 1989 (to Recsk 1950-1953: The Story Of A Secret Concentration Camp In Communist Hungary)
- Currently held by: Fiume o morte! (2025)
- Website: www.europeanfilmawards.eu

The European Film Award for Best Documentary or Prix Arte has been awarded annually since 1989 by the European Film Academy. Special Mentions were presented alongside the winner of the award until 1993, since 1999 a set of nominees are presented out of which a winner is chosen.

== Criteria ==
Documentary films taken into consideration must have a minimum length of 70 minutes. They must have either had a theatrical release in at least one European country, at a European competitive feature film festival accredited by FIAPF or been screened at one of the following documentary festivals:

- Cinéma du Réel (France)
- Copenhagen International Documentary Festival (Denmark)
- Doclisboa (Portugal)
- Dok Leipzig (Germany)
- International Documentary Film Festival Amsterdam (The Netherlands)
- Jihlava International Documentary Film Festival (Czech Republic)
- Kraków Film Festival (Poland)
- Sheffield Doc/Fest (UK)
- Thessaloniki Documentary Festival (Greece)
- Visions du Réel (Switzerland)

== Winners and nominees ==
The winners are in a yellow background and in bold.

=== 1980s ===
Year	English title	Original title	Director(s)	Production country
1989 (2nd)	**Recsk 1950-1953: The Story Of A Secret Concentration Camp In Communist Hungary**	**Recsk 1950–1953, egy titkos kényszermunkatábor története**	**Géza Böszörményi and Lívia Gyarmathy**	**Hungary**
1989 (2nd)	A Story of the Wind ^{[J]}	Een verhaal van de wind	Joris Ivens & Marceline Loridan	Netherlands
1989 (2nd)	The Road to God Knows Where ^{[S]}		Alan Gilsenan	Ireland
1989 (2nd)	Pictures of the Old World ^{[S]}	Obrazy starého sveta	Dušan Hanák	Czechoslovakia

=== 1990s ===
Year	English title	Original title	Director(s)	Production country
1990 (3rd)	**The Crossroad**	**Šķērsiela**	**Ivars Seleckis**	**Soviet Union**
1990 (3rd)	Step Across the Border^{[S]}		Nicholas Humbert & Werner Penzel	Switzerland
1991 (4th)	**Hear My Cry**	**Usłyszcie mój krzyk**	**Maciej Drygas**	**Poland**
1991 (4th)	Crimes and passions - the scar^{[S]}	Crimes et passions - la cicatrice	Mireille Dumas	France
1991 (4th)	The Wall^{[S]}	Die Mauer	Jürgen Böttcher	Germany
1992 (5th)	**Earth of the Blind**	**Neregiu zeme**	**Audrius Stonys**	**Czech Republic**
1992 (5th)	Dostoyevsky’s Travels^{[S]}		Paweł Pawlikowski	United Kingdom
1992 (5th)	Lovers on Trial^{[S]}	Les amants d'assises	Manu Bonmariage	Belgium
1993 (6th)	**Misfits To Yuppies**	**Det sociala arvet**	**Stefan Jarl**	**Sweden**
1993 (6th)	The Man Who Loves Gary Lineker^{[S]}		Ylli Hasani, Steve Sklair	United Kingdom
1993 (6th)	89mm from Europe^{[S]}	89mm od Europy	Marcel Łoziński	Poland
1994 (7th)	**Angels of Sarajevo**	**Anđeli u Sarajevu**	**Saga-Group Sarajevo**	**Bosnia and Herzegovina**
1995 (8th)	**Viva Stalin**		**Jens Meurer**	**Germany**
1996 (9th)	**Vendetta - Blood Revenge in Albania**	**Vendetta - Blutrache in Albanien**	**Jerzy Sladkowski, Stanislav Krzeminski**	**Germany**
1997 (10th)	**Gigi, Monica... and Bianca**	**Gigi, Monica... et Bianca**	**Yasmina Abdellaoui, Benoît Dervaux**	**Belgium, Romania**
1998 (11th)	**Painting with Falls**	**Tableau avec chutes**	**Claudio Pazienza**	**Belgium, France**
1999 (12th)	**Buena Vista Social Club**		**Wim Wenders**	**Germany, United States, United Kingdom, Cuba, France**
1999 (12th)	Mr Zwilling und Mrs Zuckermann	Herr Zwilling und Frau Zuckermann	Volker Koepp	Germany
1999 (12th)	My Best Fiend	Mein liebster Feind - Klaus Kinski	Werner Herzog	Germany
1999 (12th)	Bach in Auschwitz	La chaconne d'Auschwitz	Michel Daeron	France
1999 (12th)	The Truth Commission	La commission de la vérité	André van In	Belgium
1999 (12th)	Mobutu, king of Zaire	Mobutu, roi du Zaïre	Thierry Michel	Belgium
1999 (12th)	Pripyat		Nikolaus Geyrhalter	Austria

^{^[J]}Jury Special Award
^{^[S]}Special Mention

=== 2000s ===
Year	English title	Original title	Director(s)	Production country
2000 (12th)	**The Gleaners and I**	**Les glaneurs et la glaneuse**	**Agnès Varda**	**France**
2000 (12th)	Calle 54		Fernando Trueba	Spain
2000 (12th)	Gulag	Goulag	Iossif Pasternak, Hélène Châtelain	France
2000 (12th)	Working Women of the World	Ouvrières du monde	Marie-France Collard	France
2000 (12th)	Home Game	Heimspiel	Pepe Danquart	Germany
2000 (12th)	One Day in September		Kevin Macdonald	United Kingdom
2001 (13th)	**Black Box BRD**		**Andres Veiel**	**Germany**
2002 (14th)	**To Be and to Have**	**Être et avoir**	**Nicolas Philibert**	**France**
2003 (16th)	**S21: The Khmer Rouge Death Machine**	**S-21, la machine de mort Khmère rouge**	**Rithy Panh**	**France, Cambodia**
2003 (16th)	The Five Obstructions	De fem benspænd	Lars Von Trier, Jørgen Leth	Denmark, Belgium, Switzerland, France
2003 (16th)	Whose Is This Song?	Chia e tazi pesen?	Adela Peeva	Bulgaria, Belgium
2003 (16th)	Eat, Sleep, No Women	Essen, schlafen, keine Frauen	Heiner Stadler	Germany
2003 (16th)	A Species' Odyssey	L'odyssée de l'espèce	Jacques Malaterre, Javier G. Salanova	France, Canada, Italy, Switzerland, Belgium
2003 (16th)	The Day I Will Never Forget		Kim Longinotto	United Kingdom
2003 (16th)	The Story of the Weeping Camel	Die Geschichte vom weinenden Kamel	Byambasuren Davaa, Luigi Falorni	Germany, Mongolia
2003 (16th)	Hush!	Tishe!	Viktor Kossakovsky	Russia
2004 (17th)	**Darwin's Nightmare**		**Hubert Sauper**	**Austria, France, Belgium**
2004 (17th)	Aileen: Life and Death of a Serial Killer		Nick Broomfield, Joan Churchill	United Kingdom
2004 (17th)	Addicted to Acting	Die Spielwütigen	Andres Veiel	Germany
2004 (17th)	Basque Ball, Skin Against Stone	La pelota vasca, la piel contra la piedra	Julio Medem	Spain
2004 (17th)	The World According to Bush	Le monde selon Bush	William Karel	France
2004 (17th)	Checkpoint	Mahssomim	Yoav Shamir	Israel
2004 (17th)	The Last Victory		John Appel	Netherlands
2004 (17th)	Touch the Sound		Thomas Riedelsheimer	Germany, United Kingdom, Finland
2005 (18th)	**The Pipeline Next Door**	**Un dragon dans les eaux**	**Nino Kirtadzé**	**France**
2005 (18th)	Stroke	Am seidenen Faden	Katarina Peters	Germany
2005 (18th)	The Devil's Miner	Berg des Teufels	Richard Ladkani, Kief Davidson	Germany
2005 (18th)	Dreamland	Leiputrija	Laila Pakalnina	Latvia, Germany
2005 (18th)	Raw Youth	Ungdommens råskap	Margreth Olin	Norway, Denmark
2005 (18th)	Melodias		François Bovy	Switzerland
2005 (18th)	Before Flying Back to the Earth	Pries parskrendant i zeme	Arunas Matelis	Lithuania, Germany
2005 (18th)	Workingman's Death		Michael Glawogger	Austria, Germany
2005 (18th)	Rehearsals	Repetitioner	Michal Leszczylowsky, Gunnar Källström	Sweden
2005 (18th)	The Swenkas		Jeppe Rønde	Denmark,
2005 (18th)	Viva Zapatero!		Sabina Guzzanti	Italy, Denmark
2006 (19th)	**Into Great Silence**	**Die Grosse Stile**	**Philip Gröning**	**Germany**
2006 (19th)	37 Uses for a Dead Sheep		Ben Hopkins	United Kingdom
2006 (19th)	Dreaming by Numbers		Anna Bucchetti	Netherlands
2006 (19th)	Grandmother's House	La casa de mi abuela	Adán Aliaga	Spain
2006 (19th)	Maradona, the Golden Kid	Maradona, un gamin en or	Jean-Christophe Rosé	France
2006 (19th)	The Cemetery Club	Moadon beit hakvarot	Tali Shemesh	Israel
2006 (19th)	The Fisherman and the Dancing Girl	Rybak i tantsovshitsa	Valeriy Solomin	Russia
2006 (19th)	Our Daily Bread	Unser täglich Brot	Nikolaus Geyrhalter	Austria
2007 (20th)	**Paper Cannot Wrap Up Embers**	**Le papier ne peut pas envelopper la braise**	**Rithy Panh**	**France**
2007 (20th)	To the Limit	Am Limit	Pepe Danquart	Germany, Austria
2007 (20th)	Belarusian Waltz		Andrzej Fidyk	Norway
2007 (20th)	Forever		Heddy Honigmann	Netherlands
2007 (20th)	Echoes of Home	Heimatklänge	Stefan Schwietert	Switzerland, Germany
2007 (20th)	9 Star Hotel	Malon 9 Kochavim	Ido Haar	Israel
2007 (20th)	The Monastery		Pernille Rose Grønkjær	Denmark
2007 (20th)	Divorce Albanian Style	Razvod Po Albanski	Adela Peeva	Bulgaria
2007 (20th)	The Champagne Spy	Meragel Hashampaniya	Nadav Schirman	Israel, Germany
2007 (20th)	Where is the Love in the Palmgrove?	Où est l'amour dans la palmeraie?	Jérôme Le Maire	Belgium
2008 (21st)	**René**		**Helena Trestikova**	**Czech Republic**
2008 (21st)	Durakovo – Village of Fools	Durakovo – Le village des fous	Nino Kirtadzé	France
2008 (21st)	Fados		Carlos Saura	Portugal, Spain
2008 (21st)	Children. As Time Flies.	Kinder. Wie Zeit vergeht.	Thomas Heise	Germany
2008 (21st)	The Mother	La mère	Antoine Cattin, Pavel Kostomarov	Switzerland
2008 (21st)	Man on Wire		James Marsh	United Kingdom, United States
2008 (21st)	Stranded: I've Come from a Plane That Crashed on the Mountains	Naufragés des Andes	Gonzalo Arijón	France
2008 (21st)	Citizen Havel	Obcan Václav Havel	Pavel Koutecký, Miroslav Janek	Czech Republic
2008 (21st)	Shadow of the Holy Book	Pyhän kirjan varjo	Arto Halonen	Finland
2008 (21st)	The Dictator Hunter		Klaartje Quirijns	Netherlands
2009 (22nd)	**The Sound of Insects – Records of a Mummy**	**Das Summen der Insekten – Bericht einer Mumie**	**Peter Liechti**	**Switzerland**
2009 (22nd)	Cooking History	Ako sa varia dejiny	Peter Kerekes	Slovakia, Austria, Czech Republic
2009 (22nd)	Pianomania		Lilian Franck, Robert Cibis	Germany, Austria
2009 (22nd)	Below Sea Level		Gianfranco Rosi	Italy, United States
2009 (22nd)	Burma VJ		Anders Østergaard	Denmark
2009 (22nd)	The Heart of Jenin	Das Herz von Jenin	Leon Geller, Marcus Vetter	Germany
2009 (22nd)	The Damned of the Sea	Les damnes de la mer	Jawad Rhalib	Belgium
2009 (22nd)	Defamation		Yoav Shamir	Denmark, Austria, Israel, United States
2009 (22nd)	The Woman with the 5 Elephants	Die Frau mit den 5 Elefanten	Vadim Jendreyko	Switzerland, Germany
2009 (22nd)	The Beaches of Agnès	Les plages d'Agnès	Agnès Varda	France

=== 2010s ===
Year	English title	Original title	Director(s)	Production country
2010 (23rd)	**Nostalgia for the Light**	**Nostalgia de la luz**	**Patricio Guzmán**	**France, Germany, Chile**
2010 (23rd)	Armadillo		Janus Metz	Denmark, Sweden
2010 (23rd)	Steam of Life	Miesten vuoro	Joonas Berghäll, Mika Hotakainen	Finland, Sweden
2011 (24th)	**Pina**		**Wim Wenders**	**Germany**
2011 (24th)	Position Among the Stars	Stand van de sterren	Leonard Retel Helmrich	Netherlands
2011 (24th)	¡Vivan las Antipodas!		Viktor Kossakovsky	Germany, Netherlands, Argentina, Chile
2012 (25th)	**Winter Nomad**	**Hiver Nomade**	**Manuel von Stürler**	**Switzerland**
2012 (25th)	London – The Modern Babylon		Julien Temple	United Kingdom
2012 (25th)	Tea or Electricity	Le thé ou l'électricité	Jerome Lemaire	Belgium, France, Morocco
2013 (26th)	**The Act of Killing**	**Jagal**	**Joshua Oppenheimer**	**Denmark, Norway, United Kingdom**
2013 (26th)	Stop-Over	L'escale	Kaveh Bakhtiari	Switzerland, France
2013 (26th)	The Missing Picture	L'image manquante	Rithy Panh	France, Cambodia
2014 (27th)	**Master of the Universe**		**Marc Bauder**	**Germany, Austria**
2014 (27th)	Just the Right Amount of Violence		Jon Bang Carlsen	Denmark
2014 (27th)	Of Men and War	Des hommes et de la guerre	Laurent Bécue-Renard	France, Switzerland
2014 (27th)	Sacro GRA		Gianfranco Rosi	Italy, France
2014 (27th)	Waiting For August		Teodora Ana Mihai	Belgium, Romania
2014 (27th)	We Come as Friends		Hubert Sauper	Austria, France
2015 (28th)	**Amy**		**Asif Kapadia**	**United Kingdom**
2015 (28th)	Dancing with Maria		Ivan Gergolet	Italy, Argentina, Slovenia
2015 (28th)	A Syrian Love Story		Sean McAllister	United Kingdom, France
2015 (28th)	The Look of Silence	Senyap	Joshua Oppenheimer	Denmark, Finland, Indonesia, Norway, United Kingdom
2015 (28th)	Toto and His Sisters		Alexander Nanau	Romania
2016 (29th)	**Fire at Sea**	**Fuocoammare**	**Gianfranco Rosi**	**Italy, France**
2016 (29th)	21 x New York	21 x Nowy Jork	Piotr Stasik	Poland
2016 (29th)	A Family Affair		Tom Fassaertr	Netherlands, Belgium
2016 (29th)	Mr. Gaga		Tomer Heymann	Israel, Sweden, Germany, Netherlands
2016 (29th)	S Is for Stanley	Trent'anni dietro al volante per Stanley Kubrick	Alex Infascelli	Italy
2016 (29th)	The Land of the Enlightened		Pieter-Jan De Pue	Belgium, Ireland, Netherlands, Germany
2017 (30th)	**Communion**	**Komunia**	**Anna Zamecka**	**Poland**
2017 (30th)	Austerlitz		Sergei Loznitsa	Germany
2017 (30th)	La Chana		Lucija Stojevic	Spain, Iceland, United States
2017 (30th)	Stranger in Paradise		Guido Hendrikx	Netherlands
2017 (30th)	The Good Postman	Hyvä postimies	Tonislav Hristov	Finland, Bulgaria
2018 (31st)	**Bergman: A Year in a Life**	**Bergman - ett år, ett liv**	**Jane Magnusson**	**Sweden, Norway**
2018 (31st)	A Woman Captured	Egy nő fogságban	Tuza-Ritter	Romania, Germany
2018 (31st)	The Distant Barking of Dogs	Olegs krig	Simon Lering Wilmont	Denmark, Finland, Sweden
2018 (31st)	Of Fathers and Sons	عن الآباء والأبناء	Talal Derki	Germany, Syria, Lebanon, Qatar
2018 (31st)	The Silence of Others	El silencio de otros	Almudena Carracedo and Robert Bahar	Spain, United States
2019 (32nd)	**For Sama**	**من أجل سما**	**Waad al-Kateab and Edward Wat**	**United Kingdom, United States**
2019 (32nd)	Honeyland	Медена земја	Ljubomir Stefanov and Tamara Kotevska	North Macedonia
2019 (32nd)	Selfie		Agostino Ferrente	France, Italy
2019 (32nd)	Putin's Witnesses		Vitaly Mansky	Latvia, Switzerland, Czech Republic
2019 (32nd)	The Disappearance of my Mother		Beniamino Barrese	Italy, United States

=== 2020s ===
Year	English title	Original title	Director(s)	Country
2020 (33rd)	**Collective**	**Colectiv**	**Alexander Nanau**	**Romania, Luxembourg**
2020 (33rd)	Acasă, My Home	Acasă	Radu Ciorniciuc	Romania, Germany, Finland
2020 (33rd)	The Cave	الكهف	Feras Fayyad	Syria, Denmark
2020 (33rd)	Gunda		Viktor Kossakovsky	Norway, Russia
2020 (33rd)	Little Girl	Petite fille	Sébastien Lifshitz	France
2020 (33rd)	Saudi Runaway		Susanne Regina Meures	Switzerland
2021 (34th)	**Flee**	**Flugt**	**Jonas Poher Rasmussen**	**Denmark, France, Sweden, Norway**
2021 (34th)	Babi Yar. Context		Sergei Loznitsa	Netherlands, Germany
2021 (34th)	Mr Bachmann and His Class	Herr Bachmann und Seine Klasse	Maria Speth	Germany
2021 (34th)	Taming the Garden		Salomé Jashi	Switzerland, Germany, Georgia
2021 (34th)	The Most Beautiful Boy in the World	Världens vackraste pojke	Kristina Lindström and Kristian Petri	Sweden
2022 (35th)	**Mariupolis 2**		**Mantas Kvedaravičius**	Lithuania, France, Germany
2022 (35th)	The Balcony Movie	Film balkonowy	Paweł Łoziński	Poland
2022 (35th)	Girl Gang		Susanne Regina Meures	Switzerland
2022 (35th)	A House Made of Splinters	Будинок із трісок	Simon Lereng Wilmont	Denmark, Sweden, Finland, Ukraine
2022 (35th)	The March on Rome		Mark Cousins	Italy
2023 (36th)	**Smoke Sauna Sisterhood**	**Savvusanna sõsarad**	**Anna Hints**	**Estonia**
2023 (36th)	Apolonia, Apolonia		Lea Glob	Denmark
2023 (36th)	Four Daughters	Les Filles d'Olfa	Kaouther Ben Hania	Tunisia
2023 (36th)	Motherland		Hanna Badziaka & Alexander Mihalkovich	Belarus
2023 (36th)	On the Adamant	Sur l’Adamant	Nicolas Philibert	France
2024 (37th)	**No Other Land**		**Yuval Abraham,** **Rachel Szor,** **Basel Adra, and** **Hamdan Ballal**	**Palestine, Norway**
2024 (37th)	Bye Bye Tiberias	باي باي طبريا	Lina Soualem	France, Belgium, Palestine, Qatar
2024 (37th)	Dahomey		Mati Diop	France, Senegal
2024 (37th)	In Limbo	W zawieszeniu	Alina Maksimenko	Poland
2024 (37th)	Soundtrack to a Coup d'Etat		Johan Grimonprez	France, Belgium, Netherlands
2025 (38th)	**Fiume o morte!**		**Igor Bezinović**	**Croatia, Italy, Slovenia**
2025 (38th)	Afternoons of Solitude	Tardes de soledad	Albert Serra	France, Spain
2025 (38th)	Riefenstahl		Andres Veiel	Germany
2025 (38th)	Songs of Slow Burning Earth		Olha Zhurba	Denmark, France, Sweden, Ukraine
2025 (38th)	With Hasan in Gaza	مع حسن في غزّة	Kamal Aljafari	Palestine, Germany, Switzerland, France, Qatar
2026 (39th)	Letters from the Silenced Country	Listy	Andrei Kutsila	Poland, Germany, Lithuania
2026 (39th)	NAZA		Yuval Abraham and Rachel Szor	United Kingdom
2026 (39th)	Rehearsals for a Revolution	خاطرات ایران	Pegah Ahangarani	Czech Republic, Spain
2026 (39th)	To Hold a Mountain	Planina	Biljana Tutorov and Petar Glomazić	Montenegro, Serbia, France, Slovenia, Croatia
2026 (39th)	Whispers in the Woods	Le Chant des forêt	Vincent Munier	France
