= György Gábori =

Hungarian writer, politician (1924–1997)

György Gábori (George Gabori) (1924, Putnok – 1997, Toronto) was a Hungarian Jewish author. His best known book is When evils were most free, which is essentially a biography. He was a lifetime friend of fellow Hungarian poet György Faludy. In his difficult youth, he was put into the Dachau concentration camp, and he also survived the Communist Recsk concentration camp. After the Hungarian Revolution of 1956, he first moved to Montreal, then in the wake of Quebec separatism he finally moved to Toronto, Ontario.

== Early life ==
He was born in 1924 in Putnok, Hungary to a Jewish family getting a Humanist upbringing from his father and Jewish religious lectures from his grandfather. Their predecessors, the Grosz family arrived in Hungary at the beginning of the 19th century fleeing the 'swords of Cossacks'. On their way they left behind accessories of Yiddish life. His great-grandfather worked himself into early death as a winedealer. As the region was mostly antisemitic at the time, the Putnok people were angry at the local Earl for always greeting the Jewish dealer.

By the time György Gábori was born, the family Grosz had been very rich, strongly Jewish and professedly Hungarian. That was enough reason for hatred coming from the Zionists and the gentries, the Communists and the Nazis.

== Main work ==
- Amikor elszabadult a gonosz (Magyar Világ Kiadó ISBN 963-7815-34-1)
