= Faludy =

Faludy is a Hungarian surname. People with the surname include:

- Alexander Faludy (born 1983), English former child prodigy
- György Faludy (1910–2006), Hungarian-born poet, writer and translator

== See also ==
- Susan Faludi (born 1959), American journalist and author
