= Flipping Out (film) =

- Film poster
- Directed by: Yoav Shamir
- Written by: Yoav Shamir
- Produced by: Leon Edery; Moshe Edery; Philippa Kowarsky; Kent Martin; Michael Sharfstein
- Cinematography: Yoav Shamir, Jonathan Ofek
- Edited by: Era Lapid
- Music by: Ophir Leibovitch
- Production company: Topia Communications
- Release date: September 30, 2007 (HIFF)
- Running time: 84 minutes
- Countries: Israel; Canada
- Languages: Hebrew; English

Flipping Out is a 2007 Israeli-Canadian documentary film directed by Yoav Shamir describing the drug use of Israeli men and women in India. It follows Israeli soldiers who take their discharge bonus and travel to India, where 90 percent will take drugs and around 2,000 will eventually need professional help after experiencing drug-induced mental breakdowns, or "flipping out".

== Summary ==
The documentary shows the response of Israeli agencies to the growing problem of settlements in India with ex-soldiers involved in drug use. One encounter in Flipping Out is the meeting between the Israeli Deputy Prime Minister Eli Yishai and former soldiers. One female soldier tells him that she is on her second trip to India and that "...here one can feel normal again .no bombings, no corruption, none of that pressure [faced] back in Israel... one comes here and feels normal again".

== Production ==
The film was produced by Israel's Topia Communications and Cinephil and the National Film Board of Canada. Yoav Shamir described it as a sequel to his 2003 documentary Checkpoint, which follows Israeli soldiers in disputed Green Zone territories. His intention was to show what happens to the soldiers after they have gone through what he portrayed in the previous film.

== Release ==
The film premiered on September 30, 2007 at the Haifa International Film Festival. It was screened in the Forum section of the 58th Berlin International Film Festival. It was also shown on the Sundance Channel.

== Reception ==
Variety wrote that the film has a slower pace than Shamir's previous films, and that it "doesn't compensate by offering richer dramatic meat or particularly useful psychological insight." The critic continued:

Too many storylines tend to dilute the strongest strands, while pic misses a trick by scrimping on viewpoints of local Indians. Lensing by Yoav Shamir himself is competent, but transfer to 35mm looks blurry and curiously drab given the story's colorful setting. Abundant use of onscreen textual information contributes to pic's general made-for-TV look.
