= Hear My Cry =

Hear My Cry may refer to:

- Hear My Cry (film), a 1991 Polish documentary film
- Hear My Cry (album), a 2000 album by Sonique
- Hear My Cry, a 1997 album by Rayvon
