= Abraham Foxman =

American lawyer and activist (1940–2026)

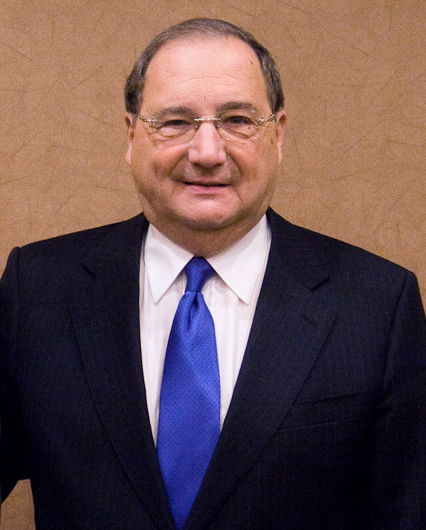
- Foxman in 2011

5th Director of the Anti-Defamation League
- In office 1987–2015
- Preceded by: Nathan Perlmutter
- Succeeded by: Jonathan Greenblatt

Personal details
- Born: Avraham Chanoch Hanach Fuksman; May 1, 1940 Baranovichi, Byelorussian SSR, Soviet Union
- Died: May 10, 2026 (aged 86) New York City, U.S.
- Spouse: Golda Bauman
- Children: 2
- Education: City College of New York (BA); New York University (JD)

Abraham Henry Foxman (born Avraham Chanoch Hanach Fuksman; May 1, 1940 – May 10, 2026) was an American lawyer and activist. He served as the national director of the Anti-Defamation League (ADL) from 1987 to 2015, and was most recently the organization's national director emeritus. From 2016 to 2021, he served as vice-chair of the board of trustees at the Museum of Jewish Heritage in New York City in order to lead its efforts against antisemitism.

== Early life ==
Foxman, the only son of Yelena and Iosif Fuksman, was born on May 1, 1940, in Baranovichi (now Belarus) just months after the Soviet Union conquered the town from Poland in the Molotov–Ribbentrop Pact and incorporated it into the Byelorussian Soviet Socialist Republic. Foxman's parents were Polish Jews.

When ordered by the Germans to enter a ghetto in 1941, Foxman's parents left him with his nanny, Bronisława Kurpi, a Catholic Pole. Foxman was baptized into Christianity by the Catholic Church, given the Polish Christian name of Henryk Stanisław Kurpi, and raised as a Catholic in Vilnius until he was returned to his parents in 1944.

== Education and career ==
The Foxman family immigrated to the United States in 1950. Foxman graduated from the Yeshivah of Flatbush in Brooklyn, New York City, earned a Bachelor of Arts degree in political science from the City College of New York and graduated with honors in history. Foxman also held a J.D. degree from the New York University School of Law. He did graduate work in Jewish studies at the Jewish Theological Seminary of America, and in international economics at The New School.

In 1965, Foxman was hired by ADL legal representative Arnold Forster as a legal assistant in the ADL's international affairs division. He rose through the ranks of the organization, becoming the head of its Middle Eastern affairs and later its international affairs. In 1987, Foxman was the consensus choice of the Board to become its new National Director, replacing long-time director Nathan Perlmutter. Also that year, he was appointed to the council of the United States Holocaust Memorial Museum by U.S. President Ronald Reagan, and was reappointed by subsequent U.S. Presidents George H. W. Bush, Bill Clinton, and Joe Biden.

As the then head of the ADL, he is credited by the Jewish Telegraphic Agency for having transformed the organization "from a division of B'nai Brith into a muscular juggernaut" that offered anti-bias and training programs, combatted antisemitism in the U.S. and worldwide, and pushed for anti-discrimination laws across several locations. In 1999, amid a wave of antisemitic violence in Europe, he criticized the leaders of France and Germany for failing to address the issue. Such remarks earned him access to world leaders and figures such as Pope John Paul II, with whom he would meet frequently. He also met with diplomats, celebrities, and CEOs, and heard apologies from figures who made anti-Jewish remarks, stating that it was essential to accept apologies, especially from those who can serve as prominent allies for Jews.

Foxman retired as head of the ADL in 2015, being succeeded by Jonathan Greenblatt. He later served as vice chair on New York's Museum of Jewish Heritage board of trustees between 2016 and 2021.

He was co-author of the 2013 book, Viral hate: containing its spread on the Internet.

== Personal life and death ==
He was married to Golda Bauman, and had two children: a son and a daughter. Foxman died in Manhattan, New York, on May 10, 2026, at the age of 86.

== Recognition ==
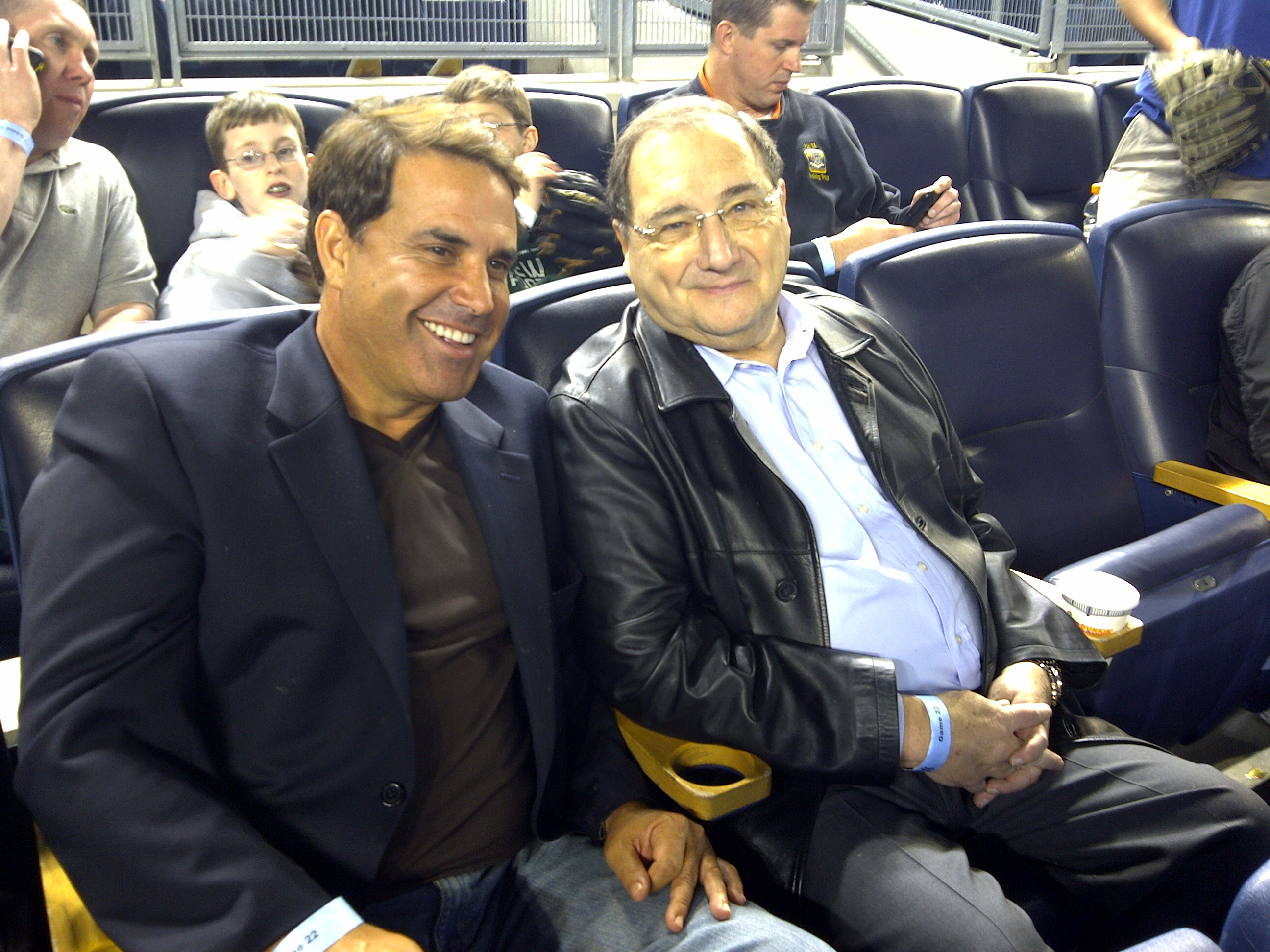
Foxman with Rick Sanchez in New York City at Yankee Stadium in 2011.

Foxman was awarded several honors from nonprofit groups, religious figures, and statesmen. In 1998, Foxman received the Interfaith Committee of Remembrance Lifetime Achievement Award "as a leader in the fight against anti-Semitism, bigotry, and discrimination". Foxman won the Raoul Wallenberg Humanitarian Leadership Award on April 18, 2002, from the Center for Holocaust and Genocide Studies at Ramapo College of New Jersey.

On October 16, 2006, Foxman was named a Knight of the Legion of Honor by French President Jacques Chirac. This award is France's highest civilian honor.

During a May 22, 2008, ceremony, Foxman was awarded an honorary doctoral degree from Yeshiva University by its president Richard Joel.

American President George W. Bush appointed Foxman to serve on the honorary delegation to accompany him to Jerusalem for the celebration of the 60th anniversary of Israel in May 2008.

== Political stances ==
=== Support for gay rights ===
Foxman's support for gay rights in America placed him at odds with many Orthodox Jews. For example, he protested the 2000 ruling by the Supreme Court in Boy Scouts of America v. Dale—a case in which "the Supreme Court ruled that the Boy Scouts of America could exclude a gay scoutmaster because of his sexual orientation". It was reported that, "Within the Jewish community, Orthodox groups supported the ruling, saying civic organizations should be empowered to determine their own message – but most Jewish organizations condemned it as endorsing discrimination." According to a report published a year later, "'We are stunned that in the year 2000, the Supreme Court could issue such a decision,' the Anti-Defamation League's national director, Abraham Foxman, and its national chairman, Howard Berkowitz, said in a statement at the time. 'This decision effectively states that as long as an organization avows an anti-homosexual position, it is free to discriminate against gay and lesbian Americans.'"

=== Criticism of Mel Gibson ===
Foxman received criticism from Jewish and non-Jewish quarters for his antagonism towards the 2004 film The Passion of the Christ and its director, Mel Gibson. In September 2003, during the pre-release controversy, Foxman called Gibson "the portrait of an anti-Semite". The next day he said, "I'm not ready to say he's an anti-Semite", but that Gibson "entertains views that can only be described as anti-Semitic". In November 2003, Foxman said of Gibson, "I think he's infected, seriously infected, with some very, very serious anti-Semitic views." In a letter to the National Review published in the March 8, 2004, issue, Foxman compared the film to the Nazi-supported 1934 Oberammergau Passion Play, concerning that "the film could legitimize anti-Semitism through its depiction of Jews."

Foxman was also criticized for his initial response to Gibson's apology for his behavior during his 2006 DUI arrest, and for giving second billing to the Seattle Jewish Federation shooting that occurred on the same day. Foxman accepted Gibson's second apology, although he continued to censure Gibson publicly, saying in 2008, "In his heyday, he was No. 1 in Hollywood, the most sought-after star, the people's choice, the icon. Then he revealed himself as an anti-Semite, and look where he is today. That's the beauty of America." Foxman continued to condemn Gibson for The Passion of the Christ, saying in 2008, "What he was doing was giving credibility, on film, in our lifetime, to deicide. Where is Mel Gibson today? He did his movie, and one day, he revealed himself to the American people. He's no icon anymore."

=== Opposition to congressional resolution recognizing the Armenian genocide ===
In July 2007, Foxman opposed a congressional resolution recognizing the Armenian genocide. "I don't think congressional action will help reconcile the issue. The resolution takes a position; it comes to a judgement", said Foxman in a statement issued to the Jewish Telegraphic Agency. "The Turks and Armenians need to revisit their past. The Jewish community shouldn't be the arbiter of that history, nor should the U.S. Congress."

Sharistan Melkonian, chairwoman of the Armenian National Committee of Eastern Massachusetts, accused Foxman of engaging in "genocide denial" in an interview with The Boston Globe. Various New England communities threatened to sever ties with the ADL-sponsored "No Place for Hate" program in response. In August 2007, Foxman publicly affirmed the position of the Anti-Defamation League, "that the consequences of [the Ottoman government's] actions were indeed tantamount to genocide", but that a United States Congressional recognition of this history was unnecessary, and not helpful. He went on to state, "We continue to firmly believe that a Congressional Resolution on such matters is a counterproductive diversion and will not foster reconciliation between Turks and Armenians. We will not hesitate to apply the term 'genocide' in the future." Foxman additionally sent a letter to Turkish Prime Minister Recep Tayyip Erdoğan expressing regret over the difficulty his position caused for the government of Turkey: "We had no intention to put the Turkish people or its leaders in a difficult position."

=== Opposition to Park51 ===
Foxman opposed the Park51 Islamic community center near the World Trade Center site. Fareed Zakaria, a recipient of ADL's Hubert H. Humphrey First Amendment Freedoms Prize, returned the prize and its $10,000 honorarium, saying that he "cannot in good conscience hold onto the award or the honorarium that came with it". Zakaria has "urged the ADL to reverse its decision".

=== Simone Zimmerman ===
Foxman called for the firing of anti-Zionist activist Simone Zimmerman, subject of the 2023 film Israelism and the then-Jewish outreach coordinator for the Bernie Sanders 2016 presidential campaign. She was only in the position for 30 hours and was terminated due to making what some considered inflammatory remarks about Benjamin Netanyahu and Hillary Clinton on social media. Foxman and Malcolm Hoenlein had called for her firing before it was revealed the remarks had been made.

=== Support for Joe Biden ===
In 2020, Foxman for the first time publicly endorsed a presidential candidate, backing Joe Biden in his race against Donald Trump. Foxman called Trump a "demagogue" whose reelection would be a "body blow for our country and our community."

== Books ==
- The Deadliest Lies: The Israel Lobby and the Myth of Jewish Control, Palgrave MacMillan, ISBN 978-1-4039-8492-0, ISBN 978-0-230-60404-9 (written as a response to Mearsheimer, John; Walt, Stephen (2007). The Israel Lobby and U.S. Foreign Policy.)
- Jews and Money: The Story of a Stereotype, Palgrave Macmillan, 2010 ISBN 978-0-230-62385-9
- A Nation of Immigrants, John F. Kennedy (Foreword), Harper Perennial, ISBN 978-0-06-144754-9
- Never Again? The Threat of the New Anti-Semitism, HarperCollins, 2003, ISBN 978-0-06-073069-7
- Viral Hate: Containing Its Spread on the Internet, written with Christopher Wolf, Palgrave Macmillan, 2013 ISBN 978-0-230-34217-0

== Films ==
- Defamation (2009): Filmmaker Yoav Shamir profiles Anti-Defamation League director Abraham Foxman in this documentary about antisemitism.
