= Recsk 1950–1953: The Story of a Secret Concentration Camp in Communist Hungary =

Recsk 1950–1953: The Story Of A Secret Concentration Camp In Communist Hungary
- Hungarian: Recsk 1950-1953, egy titkos kényszermunkatábor története
- Directed by: Géza Böszörményi, Lívia Gyarmathy
- Release date: 1988
- Country: Hungary
- Language: Hungarian

Recsk 1950–1953: The Story Of A Secret Concentration Camp In Communist Hungary, Hungarian: Recsk 1950–1953, egy titkos kényszermunkatábor története is a 1988 Hungarian documentary film directed by Lívia Gyarmathy and her husband Géza Böszörményi. Documentary tells the story of Recsk, Hungary's most notorious political prison camp, the Recsk forced labor camp, which operated between 1950 and 1953. During the early 1950s the very existence of this camp for political prisoners was one of the Hungarian communist regime's deepest secrets.

This was the first Hungarian documentary about the political prison camps of the 1950s in Hungary, and helped prepare the ground for the so-called "system change", the end of socialism in Hungary. In the film, director Lívia Gyarmathy interviews both former guards and prisoners of Recsk. The idea for the film came from Géza Böszörményi, who himself was imprisoned in Recsk.

== Awards and accolades ==
Date	Ceremony	Category	Recipient(s)	Result	Ref.
25 November 1989	2nd European Film Awards	Best Documentary	Recsk 1950-1953: The Story Of A Secret Concentration Camp In Communist Hungary	Won	
