= 10%: What Makes a Hero? =

- Directed by: Yoav Shamir
- Written by: Yoav Shamir
- Produced by: Tanya Aizikovich, Yoav Shamir, Michael Moore, Karina Rotenstein
- Starring: Philip Zimbardo
- Narrated by: Yoav Shamir
- Production company: Yoav Shamir Films
- Release date: 2013
- Running time: 88 minutes
- Countries: Israel, United States, South Africa, Germany, Congo
- Language: English

10%: What Makes a Hero? (Hebrew: 10% – מה הופך אדם לגיבור?, 10% – Mah Hofech Adam Lagibor?) is a 2013 Israeli documentary film directed by Yoav Shamir. The film focuses on the concept of heroism, which the director sets out to define and locate. The title refers to the Milgram experiment where 10% of the subjects were shown to go against authorities for the sake of moral conviction.

The film was screened at a number of international film festivals. It received the Documentary Excellence Award at the 2013 South Film Festival in Israel.

== Production ==
The film was partially financed by the filmmaker Michael Moore, who is credited as an executive producer. Shamir crowdfunded a part of the film's budget, and Moore offered to donate the same amount of money as the crowdfunding campaign was able to raise. According to Moore, he had become an admirer of Shamir after watching Shamir's 2009 film Defamation, a documentary on antisemitism and its political uses.
