= Five Days =

Five Days may refer to:

- Five Days (1954 film), a British film noir directed by Montgomery Tully
- Five Days (TV series), a British BBC/HBO TV series made between 2007 and 2010
- 5 Days (film), a documentary film by Yoav Shamir
- The Five Days of the ancient Egyptian calendar, another name for its intercalary month
