= Drygas =

Drygas is a Polish surname. Notable people with the surname include:

- Kamil Drygas (born 1991), Polish footballer
- Maciej Drygas (born 1956), Polish film director
