= Amit Breuer =

Canadian filmmaker

- עמית ברויאר
- Born: Israel
- Education: Tel-Aviv University, 1983; Beit Tzvi Institute of Cinema
- Occupations: Documentary filmmaker Producer
- Known for: Founder of Amythos Media

Amit Breuer (Hebrew: עמית ברויאר) is a Canadian-Israeli documentary filmmaker and producer. She is the founder of Amythos Media, formerly known as Amythos Films.

== Early life ==
Amit Breuer was born in Israel and received her Bachelor of Arts in general history of art from the Tel-Aviv University in 1983. Following her graduation, Breuer studied cinematography at Beit Zvi Institute of Cinema, Ramat Gan.

== Career ==
Breuer founded Amythos Films, an Israeli independent documentary production company, in 1993. In 2004, she moved to Toronto, Ontario, Canada and brought her company with her. The company was later renamed Amythos Media. Amythos Media has produced award-winning documentaries including Testimonies, St. Jean, On the Edge of Peace, The Guantanamo Trap, Sentenced to Marriage, Junction, Checkpoint, and Purity.

In 2006, Breuer cofounded the Voices Forward Festival with Stacey Donen, which they aimed to build a bridge between Israeli and Palestinian communities. The festival featured movies, art exhibits, music performances, lectures and plays. Amit served as the artistic director until 2009.

In 2006, Amit Breuer co-founded the DocAgora Association, an organization that hosts events and forums on the documentary film industry at festivals and markets worldwide. She also served as the association's president until 2009.

Breuer produced Planet Sin, a series of short films centered around the seven deadly sins in 2011. The shorts were screened at Shorts Under the Stars in Toronto, Ontario, Canada. Later that year, she co-produced Love Letters to the Future, a transmedia project designed to send messages about climate change to future generations.

== Selected projects ==
=== Production filmography ===
- Exile: A Myth Unearthed (2012)
- The Guantanamo Trap (2011)
- Kurt Masur: Adventures in Listening (2008)
- Le Blues de l'Orient/Between Two Notes (2006)
- Mekudeshet/Sentenced to Marriage (2004)
- The Junction (Video Documentary) (2003)
- Checkpoint (2003)
- Tehora/Purity: Breaking the Codes of Silence (2002)
- Human Weapon (2002)
- Sumud (2001)
- The Specialist (1999)
- King David Hotel, Jerusalem (1998)
- Baba Luba (1996)
- All Hell Broke Loose (1995)
- Mendelssohn Returns to Leipzig (1994)
- On the Edge of Peace (1994)
- Itgabar/He Will Overcome (1993)
- St. Jean (Documentary) (1993)
- Testimonies (1993)
- The Unpromised Land (1992)

=== Direction filmography ===
- Kurt Masur: Adventures in Listening (2008)
- Introitus short (2006) Director

=== Television and transmedia ===
- My September 11 (2011) Producer
- Seven Sins/Planet Sin (2011) Producer
- Love Letters to the Future (2009) Producer, Co-Creator

== Awards ==
In 1993, St. Jean won Best Documentary for the Wolgin Award for Israeli Cinema, Jerusalem film Festival and the Israel Academy Awards. Human Weapon was featured in the Middle East Studies Association FilmFest and won Special Commendation from Prix Europa in 2002.

In 2003, Checkpoint won many awards including Best International Documentary at the Docs Canadian International Documentary Festival; best feature-length documentary at the International Documentary Film Festival Amsterdam; the Golden Gate Award for Documentary Feature at the San Francisco International Film Festival; and the Docupolis Award for Best Documentary in Barcelona Docupolis. Later that year, Purity won the Fipa d'Or Award for Creative Documentary; the International Documentary Film Festival's Special Documentary Award; the Jerusalem Internal Film Festival's Mayor Award for Best Documentary Film; the SCAM Prize's Discovery of the Year; and both the Citizens Prize and Special Prize from the Yamagata International Documentary Film.

Love Letters to the Future won two Webby Awards for the Green Category and the People's Choice Award in 2010. It also won a Gemini award for Best Non-fiction Series Online. In 2011, The Guantanamo Trap won the Best Canadian Documentary Award from the National Film Board of Canada and the Special Jury Prize at Hot Docs Film Festival.

== Other ventures ==
In 2001, Breuer served as a member of the jury to select award winners for the International Documentary Film Festival Amsterdam.

She also served as a moderator in 2012 and a presenter in 2013 at South By Southwest, an annual film, interactive media and music festival in Austin, Texas. She has also served as a juror for the CPH DOX Copenhagen Amnesty Award.
