= Recsk forced labor camp =

Historical place

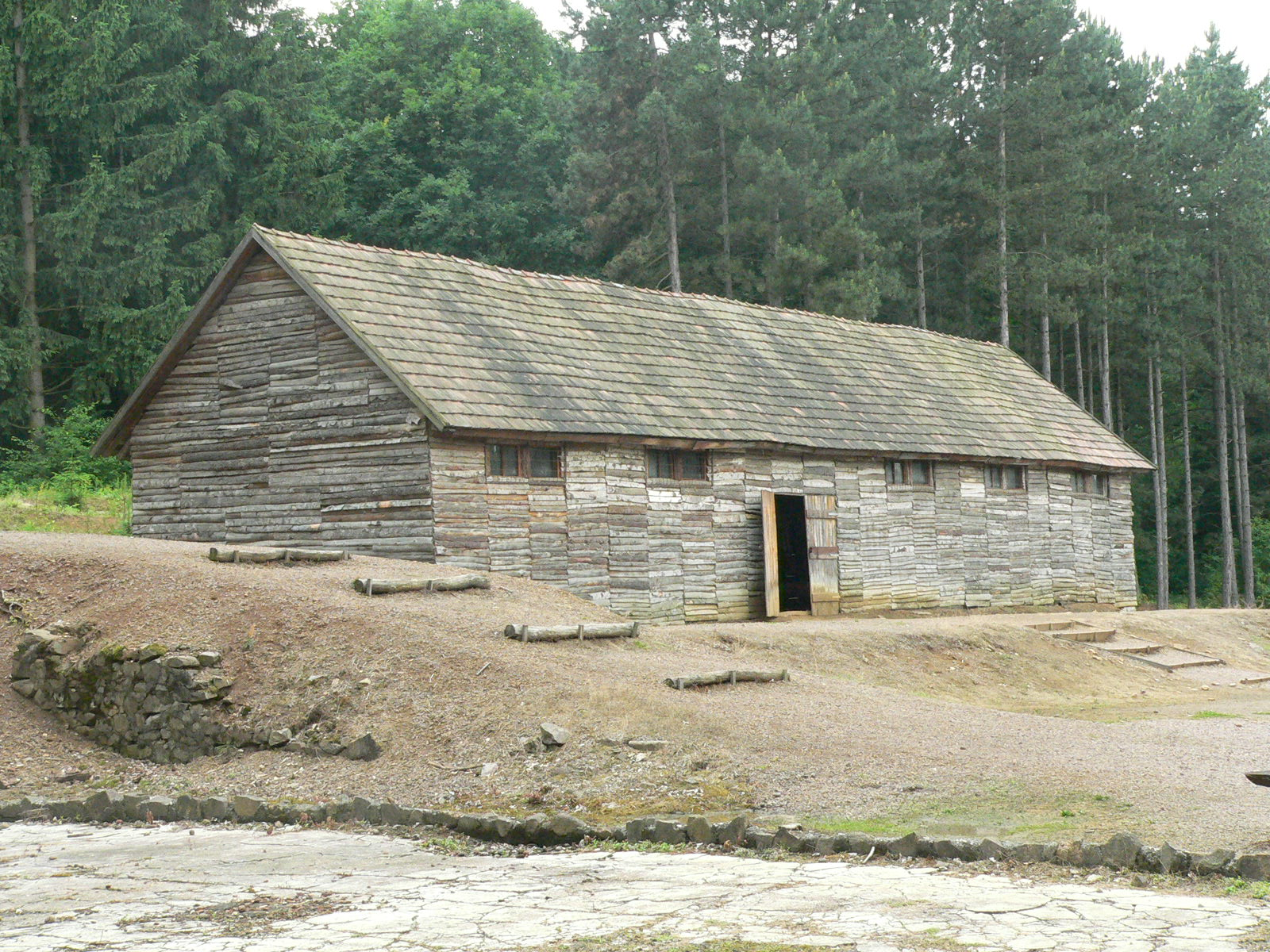
Barracks of the inmates

Recsk forced labor camp was a forced labor camp in the communist era in Hungary operated by the State Protection Authority (ÁVH) between October 1950 and the fall of 1953, near the quarry of the Csákány-kő hill, next to the village of Recsk in Heves county. It is the most infamous of the approximately 100 communist era internment and labor camps of various sizes in Hungary.

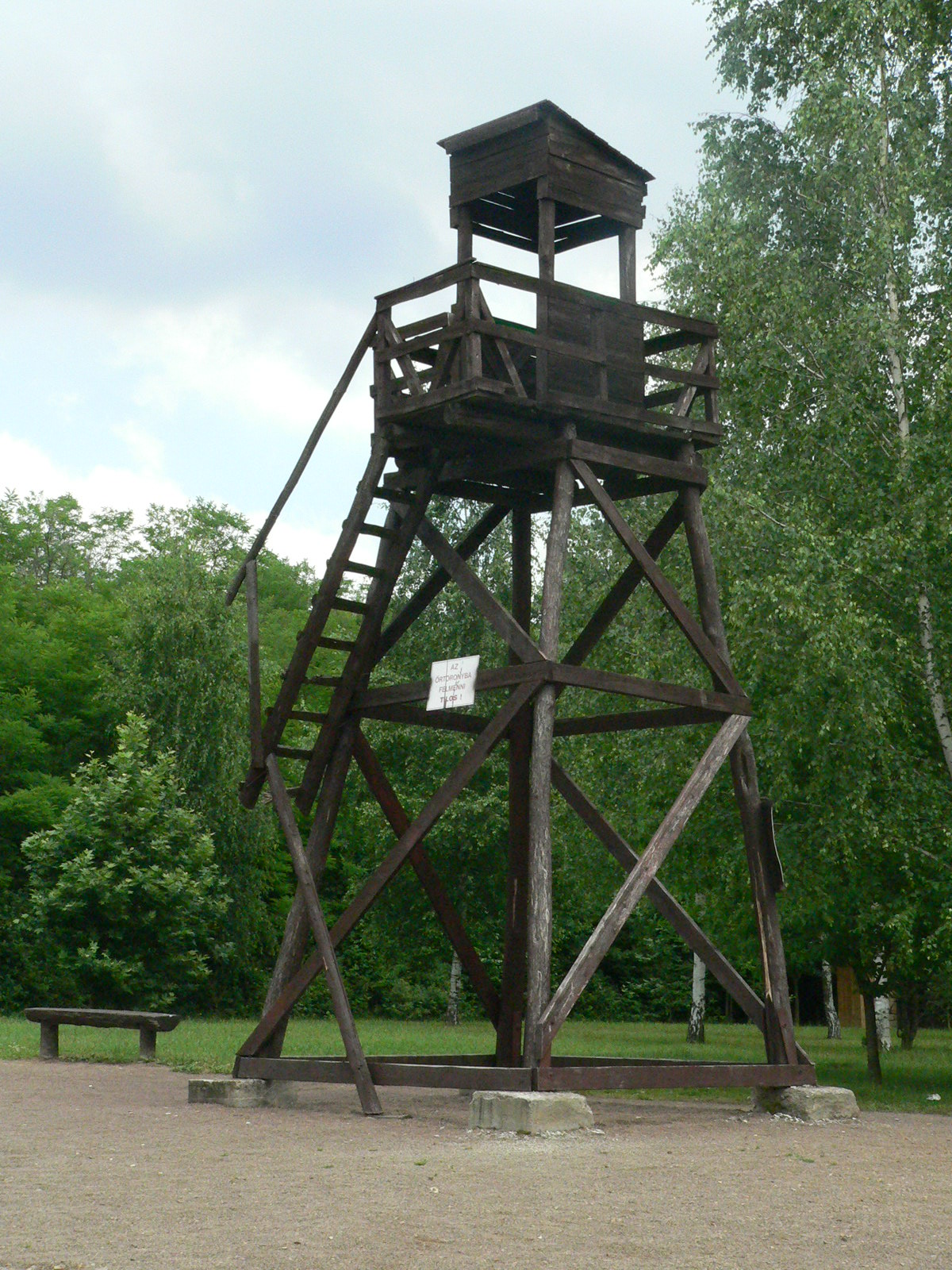
Guard tower of the camp

== Location ==
The camp is located in the county of Heves, 3 kilometers (1.8 miles) southwest of the center of the village of Recsk, near the quarry of the Csákány hill (Hungarian: Csákány-kő) in Mátra, at an altitude of 400 meters (1312 feet) above sea level (47°54′18.61″N 20°5′37.24″E). The quarry is 600 meters (approx 0.4 mile) south of the camp (47°54′3.54″N 20°5′35″E).

== History ==
The camp was organized according to the model of the Soviet Gulags; its mere existence was kept in secret.

About 1,300 – 1,700 prisoners were brought here without any court verdict.

The internees were forced to work in the quarry under minimal living conditions. The prisoners were often handled with bestial cruelty, tortured and starved. There were prisoners from all walks of life in the camp, and everyone had their own story of why they were detained.

The world was unaware of the camp and its brutal conditions till 1951, when Gyula Michnay managed to escape and get out of the country. While his seven fellow escapees were promptly captured, he successfully evaded the nationwide manhunt and crossed the border to Austria. He reached Vienna and then travelled to Munich, West Germany, where, in a broadcast on Radio Free Europe, he talked about the camp and read out the names of several hundred fellow prisoners. This was when West learnt about the existence of the camp, and some of relatives in Hungary received information about their loved ones who had disappeared without any explanation.

The last internees were set free in 1953, with the obligation of reporting at the police station nearest to their permanent residence where most of them were placed under police surveillance. At the same time, some persons were prohibited from returning their former place of residence.

All former inmates were forced to sign a statement of secrecy on their release, acknowledging that all "news and data" about the camp constitutes "state secret" and telling anything about their detention is punishable with up to 10 years in prison, in case their action is "not classified as a more serious offence".

[...] he warned us that the law promised six to ten years’ imprisonment should we drop but one word about the circumstances, place, or reasons for our imprisonment. He would advise us to report anyone who asked insistent questions and to tell our families that we had been on a study trip in the Soviet Union.

— George Faludy, My Happy Days in Hell (1962)

== Prisoners ==
George Faludy, Hungarian poet, writer and translator had been detained on fabricated charges and imprisoned in the Recsk forced labour camp, where he served years. He described his observations of the prisoners in his memoir, 'My Happy Days in Hell.' According to him:

The largest groups were the social democrats – usually old trade-union men, strike leaders, who could not get used to having to serve the interests of the state instead of those of the working class; former army officers who had gone over to the Russians in 1944 and believed that they would be able to organize an independent Hungarian army; the leading men of the different parties whom the communists had asked in 1945 to organize local smallholder or social democratic cells and who, three years later, had been arrested for having done so; kulaks, who were made to disappear in order that their lands might be expropriated, and poor peasants who were appointed kulaks, so that when the real thing was lacking they in turn could be made to disappear; so-called undisciplined workers from large factories who were arrested in order to frighten their fellow-workers; and élite workers who were arrested to frighten their fellow-workers even more.

Then there were smaller groups – for instance, almost all the officers from sea-going ships, arrested for espionage; peasants and artisans of Serbian extraction from the environment of Pécs who had participated in the banquet given by Rakosi when Tito visited Hungary, arrested for high treason; [...]

— George Faludy, My Happy Days in Hell (1962)

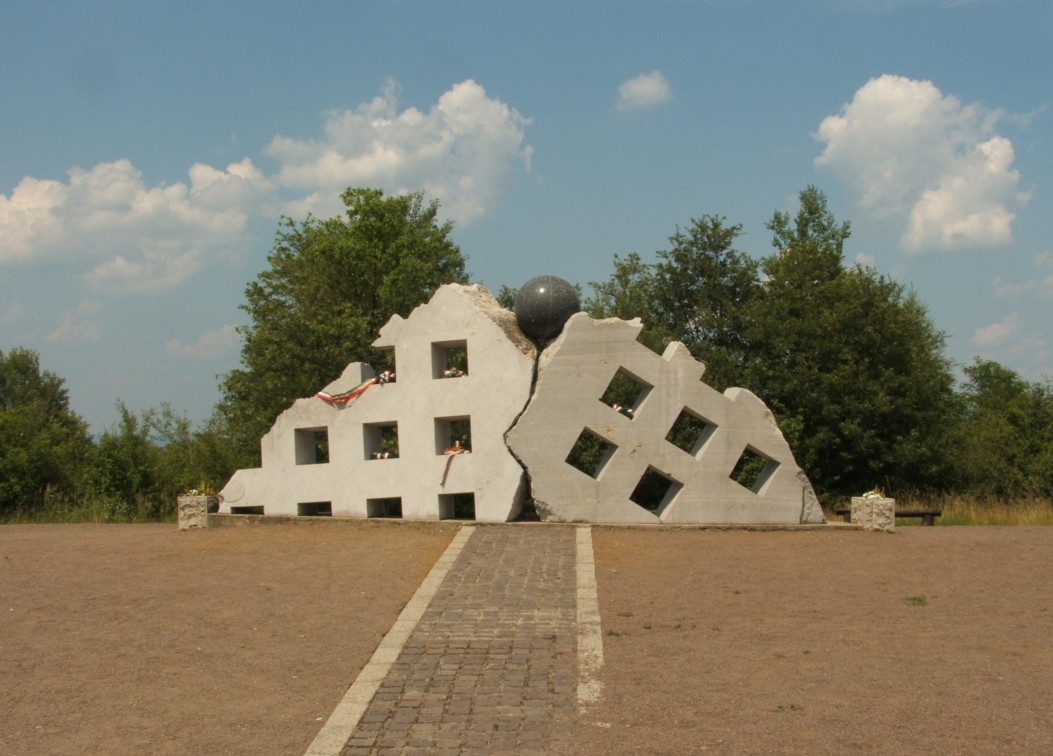
Recsk forced labour camp memorial

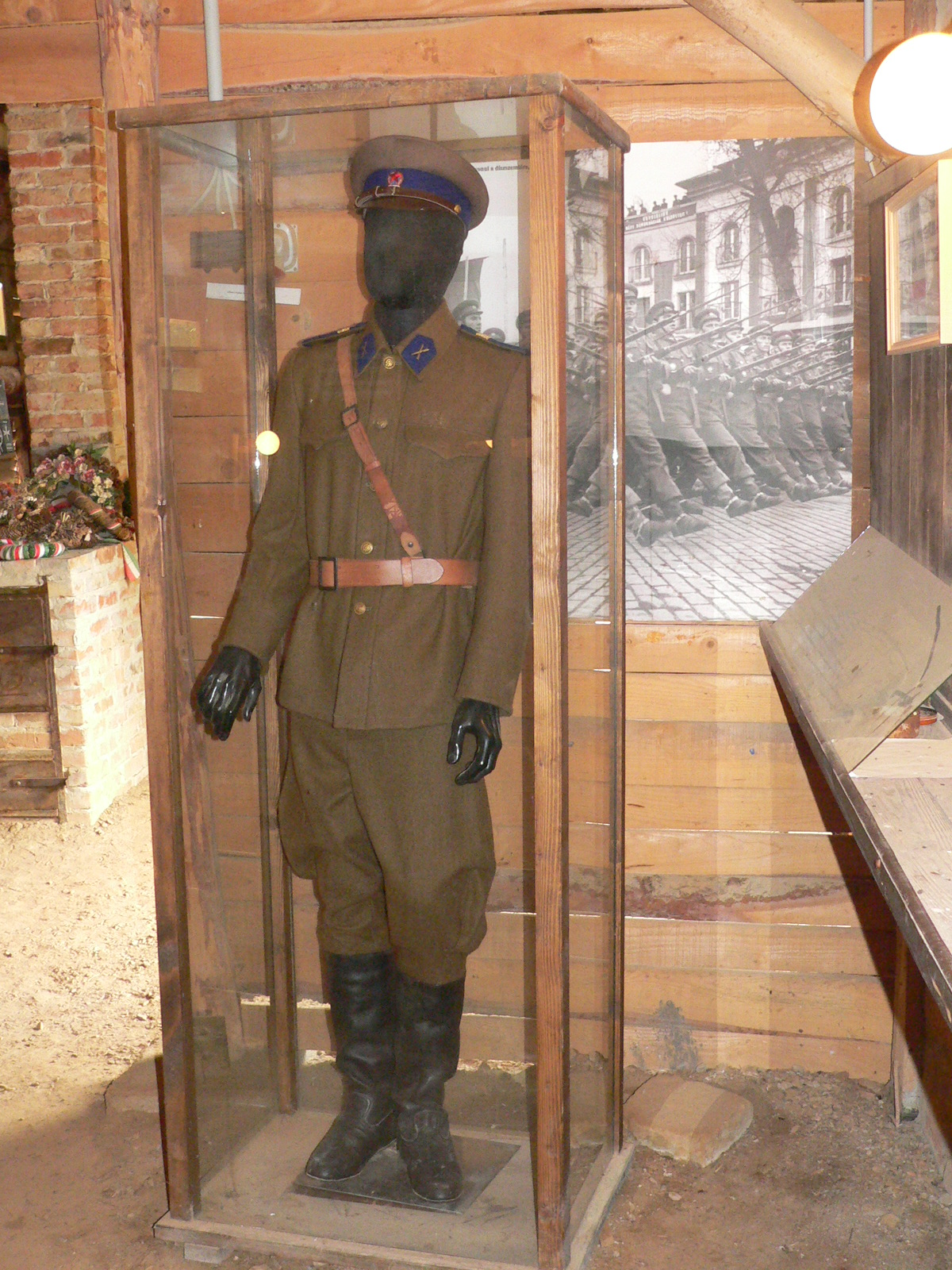
Exhibition inside the museum

== See also ==
- Recsk 1950-1953: The Story Of A Secret Concentration Camp In Communist Hungary

== Additional sources ==
- "Victims of Communism: The Nightmarish Forced Labor Camp Recsk, the 'Hungarian Gulag'"
- "Panadea > Travel guide - Photo gallery - National Memorial Park of Recsk - Recsk (Mátra Mountains, Northern Hungary, Hungary, Europe)"
- "Az egykori recski munkatábor - The former labour camp in Recsk Photo Gallery by Zoltán Balogh at pbase.com"
- "Internment - House of Terror Museum"
- "Nemzeti Örökség Intézete - Recsk, az egykori munkatábor"
- "Recsk National Memorial Park"
