= A Woman Captured =

- Directed by: Bernadett Tuza-Ritter
- Produced by: Julianna Ugrin, Viki Reka Kiss
- Edited by: Bernadett Tuza-Ritter
- Music by: Csaba Kalotás
- Production companies: Éclipse Film; Corso Film
- Release date: 19 November 2017 (IDFA)
- Running time: 89 minutes
- Country: Hungary
- Language: Hungarian

A Woman Captured (Hungarian: Egy nő fogságban) is a 2017 Hungarian documentary film directed by Bernadett Tuza-Ritter about a woman who is kept as a domestic slave in Europe. It was the first Hungarian feature-length documentary to compete at the Sundance Film Festival.

== Overview ==
The film follows Marish, a 52-year-old woman in Hungary who is kept as a modern-day slave. She decides to escape the oppression and become free again.

== Release and critical reception ==
A Woman Captured had its world premiere at the International Feature-Length Competition of the International Documentary Film Festival Amsterdam on 19 November 2017. Later it competed at Sundance, where it was nominated for Grand Jury Prize, and won the award for the Best Documentary at the Athens International Film Festival. The film was one of the five nominees for the 2018 European Film Award for Best Documentary.

== See also ==
- List of films featuring slavery
