= Nathan Perlmutter =

American Jewish leader and advocate

4th Director of the Anti-Defamation League
- In office 1979–1987
- Preceded by: Benjamin Epstein
- Succeeded by: Abraham Foxman

Personal details
- Born: March 2, 1923
- Died: July 12, 1987 (aged 64) New York, New York, U.S.
- Spouse: Ruthann Osofsky

Nathan Perlmutter (March 2, 1923 – July 12, 1987) was the American executive director of the Anti-Defamation League (ADL) from 1979 to 1987. Perlmutter joined the ADL in 1949, serving as regional director in Detroit, Miami, and New York until 1964. He became associate national director of the American Jewish Committee from 1965 to 1969. After that, he rejoined the ADL as assistant national director from 1973 to 1979, at which point he became national director. He served as ADL national director until his death in 1987. From 1969 to 1973 Perlmutter was vice president of Brandeis University.

Perlmutter received the Presidential Medal of Freedom from Ronald Reagan.

== ADL presidency (1979–1987) ==
In 1979, Nathan Perlmutter took the role of national director, serving until his death in 1987.

Before Perlmutter's tenure, the ADL had been critical of the religious Christian right and criticized the American Jewish Congress for its pursuit of evangelical support for Israel, concerned about rise in their belief in a "Christian America". Under the leadership of Perlmutter and his 1978-1983 co-director of interreligious affairs Yechiel Eckstein, the ADL shifted its approach. In the words of Eckstin, the organization began establishing "lines of communication" to Christians and people on the political right, leading to "implications for Jewish-Evangelical relations and for the question of support for Israel". Though tensions in the relations of the ADL to the religious right never eased entirely, collaboration increased. The ADL under Perlmutter began ignoring some of the more contentious policy positions on the religious right. Perlmutter said: "Jews can live with all the domestic priorities of the Christian Right on which liberal Jews differ so radically, because none of these concerns is as important as Israel". This shift reflected a similar shift occurring among other Jewish leaders, including those at the AJC, AIPAC, and the Conference of Presidents of Major American Jewish Organizations. This acquiescence to the right in favor of its support of Israel was continued under the subsequent Foxman administration. Perlmutter also made direct appeals in the Jewish press, such as in the liberal monthly the Reconstructionist.

Through the 1970s, Perlmutter opposed affirmative action in colleges. He was part of a Jewish community cohort that compared affirmative action to the quota system that had limited Jewish involvement in American and European higher education in the 1920s. Perlmutter promoted a ban on all race-based admissions criteria. This opposition caused friction with black groups the ADL had allied with through the 1960s.

In 1980, Perlmutter called on the Republican Party for a "prompt and unequivocal repudiation" of the Ku Klux Klan's endorsement of then-presidential candidate Ronald Reagan. He expressed distress at "the unfortunate stalling, buck passing and refusal to comment" on the part of white house aides questioned about the matter.

In 1980, Perlmutter said the ADL would not attend the discussions held by the National Council of Churches (NCC). He said that the NCC had organized a "predetermined outcome" in favor of the Palestine Liberation Organization in a vote. He announced this withdrawal with a note on his "deep regret", noting the long relationship between the ADL and NCC in collaborations "for human rights and interreligious and interracial friendship and understanding".

In 1980, Perlmutter criticized Union of American Hebrew Congregations president Alexander Schindler alongside similar criticisms by Rabbi Abraham Hecht, president of the Rabbinical Alliance of America. Schindler had criticized Jerry Falwell, head of the Moral Majority, arguing that Falwell's right-wing religious fundamentalism was fostering the growth of antisemitism in the United States. Perlmutter criticized Schindler for "looking at the fundamentalists as a monolithic group" and argued that one should look to the Soviet Union, rather than to Christian fundamentalism, as the main spreader of antisemitism.

In 1983, Perlmutter criticized the movie Women Under Siege, arguing that it "glorifies the PLO".

In 1984, Perlmutter said that Reverend Jesse Jackson, Sr. was antisemitic after Jackson referred to New York City as "Hymietown". Perlmutter felt that Jackson's statement would have sparked harsher criticism from Jewish community leaders in the past and accused Jackson of "continued reluctance...to repudiate his political ally Louis Farrakhan". He said that this lack of repudiation "appears to have emboldened Farrakhan into spewing his poison wantonly and without restraint".

At the same time as Perlmutter led the ADL, Israeli politics were roiling under joint governance of Likud leader Yitzhak Shamir and Labor leader Shimon Peres following a split election and formation of a cross-party coalition. Amid the associated political and organizational intrigue, Perlmutter and the ADL supported Shamir, working against the Peres strategy of land for peace and for Shamir's support of the settler movement.

== Publications ==
Perlmutter's first book, How to Win at the Races, published in 1964, was about horse racing. He later wrote the 1972 book A Bias of Reflections and co-authored the 1982 book The Real Anti-Semitism in America with his wife Ruth Ann Perlmutter.

== Childhood ==
Perlmutter grew up in Williamsburg, a neighborhood in New York City. At age 19 he began work at the Pentagon as a typist. He studied at Georgetown University School of Diplomatic and Consular Practice and Villanova College and later received a law degree from New York University Law School. During World War II, Perlmutter served in China with the United States Marine Corps.

== Family ==
Perlmutter's father Hyman was a tailor who worked for the Works Progress Administration during the Great Depression. His mother, Bella Perlmutter of the Finkelstein family, tended a pushcart that sold ices. Perlmutter's wife was Ruthann Perlmutter of the Osofsky family. His children are Dean and Nina. His brother Philip was a prominent scholar and activist in the field of inter-ethnic relations and Jewish civil rights.
