= 5 Days (film) =

2005 Israeli documentary film

- Directed by: Yoav Shamir
- Produced by: Moshe Levinson
- Cinematography: Yoav Shamir, Nadav Lapid, Amit Shalev, Gil Mezuman, Alon Zingman, Eitan Haris, Yossi Aviram, Claudio Steinberg, Shai Goldman
- Edited by: Arik Lahav-Leibovich
- Music by: Ofir Leibovich
- Release date: 2005

5 Days is a 2005 Israeli documentary film directed by Yoav Shamir. It is about the withdrawal of Israeli settlers from the Gaza Strip that took place from 14 to 18 August 2005.

== Background ==
The film follows the complexities surrounding the Israeli withdrawal from the Gaza Strip in 2005, and the internal conflict between the Israeli soldiers and the jewish settlers who forcibly evacuated from their home. The movie skillfully captures the mounting tension during a critical five-day period marked by a stand-off between Israeli soldiers and hardline settlers. Against the backdrop of a politically charged atmosphere, the withdrawal was a part of the Israeli disengagement from Gaza implemented by the Israeli government, led by then-Prime Minister Ariel Sharon. The political backdrop of the withdrawal involved the contentious decision to evacuate all Israeli civilians and military presence from the Gaza Strip, marking a significant shift in the region's geopolitical landscape. During the making of the film, the production team joined Israeli forces and settlers documenting various facets of the withdrawal.

== Reception ==
=== Festivals ===
- International Documentary Film Festival Amsterdam - 2005 - World Cinema Audience Award: Documentary Nominee
- Sundance Film Festival - 2006 Mar del Plata International Film Festival - 2006
- Melbourne International Film Festival

=== Critical response ===
Leslie Felperin of Variety reviewed the film:

Pic might have ended up playing like a rehash of yesterday’s headlines, but impressively intimate access to subjects turns this into proper drama that captures the essence of the conflict over resettlement — for liberal viewers, at least. Hard-liners may feel the settlers come off slightly worse here than the Israeli military, who acted the heavies more in Checkpoint. ... Use of overlapping sound to bridge scenes and a glowering, ominous soundtrack build up tension adroitly in last 45 minutes, as the clash between settlers and soldiers grows more combustible.
