= Maciej Drygas =

Polish documentary filmmaker

- Born: April 3, 1956 (age 70); Łódź, Poland
- Education: Gerasimov Institute of Cinematography
- Occupation: Filmmaker
- Years active: 1991–2012

Maciej Drygas (born 1956 in Łódź) is a Polish documentary filmmaker.

== Career ==
Following graduation from the Directing Department of the Moscow All-Russian State Institute of Cinematography (VGIK), also known as the Gerasimov Institute of Cinematography, he worked as an assistant to Krzysztof Zanussi and Krzysztof Kieślowski. His first documentary as director was Hear My Cry, about Ryszard Siwiec, who, in September 1968, protested against communist totalitarianism, and in particular the entry of Warsaw Pact forces into Czechoslovakia, by setting fire to himself (self-immolation) in front of thousands of people during the harvest festival at the 10th Anniversary Stadium in Warsaw, an incident that was censored in the media at the time.

His follow-up film, Weightless, looks at the human cost of the Russian space programme.

Drygas is currently director of the radio drama section at the Reportage Laboratory at Warsaw University and also teaches regularly at the Łódź Film School.

=== Documentaries ===
- Trains - 2024
- Abu Haraz - 2012
- Cudze listy / Violated Letters - 2011
- Usłysz nas wszystkich / Hear Us All - 2009
- Po tamtej stronie / The Outer Limits – 2007
- Jeden dzień w PRL / One Day in People's Poland – 2005
- Głos nadziei / Voice of Hope – 2002
- Schizofrenia / Schizophrenia – 2001
- Stan nieważkości / Weightless – 1994
- Usłyszcie mój krzyk / Hear My Cry - 1991

=== Awards ===
Stan nieważkosci / State of Weightlessness

- Prix Italia, 1994
- Grand Prix at the Lódź Media Festival, 1994
- First Prize at the Balticum Film and Television Festival in Bornholm, 1995
- Grand Prix at the International Monte-Carlo TV Festival, 1995
- Prix Europa, 1995
- First Prize at the International Film Festival Strasbourg, 1995
- Grand Prix & Press Award at the Ismailia Festival For Documentary And Short Films, 1995

Usłyszcie mój krzyk / Hear My Cry

- Felix - European Film Award for Best Documentary, 1991
- Silver Dragon at the Cracow Festival of Documentaries and Short Films, 1991
- Main Award at the Media Festival "Man under Threat" in Łódź, 1991
- Andrzej Munk Award - awarded by the Film School in Łódź, 1991
- Silver Sesterce at the International Documentary Film Festival in Nyon, 1991
- Grand Prix at the International Documentary Film Festival in Melbourne, 1991
- Golden Gate Award at the International Film Festival in San Francisco, 1991

== Other work ==
- Psychoterapia (1983 TV movie)

== See also ==
- Documentary film
