= Alexander Faludy =

British-Hungarian Anglican priest and journalist (born 1983)

Alexander Faludy (born 1983), son of English schoolteachers, Andrew and Tanya Faludy, and grandson of the Hungarian poet, György Faludy, is an Anglican priest and freelance journalist. A dual British and Hungarian national, he was a critic of the regime of prime minister Viktor Orbán (2010–2026) in Hungary. Notable as a child prodigy, in 1998, despite having dyslexia, he became the youngest undergraduate at the University of Cambridge since 1773. He was also the subject of a test case that established that the obligation of local authorities to fund education for students under the age of eighteen did not apply in respect of university education.

== Early life, dyslexia and studies at Cambridge ==
The son of two teachers from Portsmouth, Faludy attended Milton Abbey School, a boarding school in Dorset. In October 1998, when he joined Peterhouse at the age of 15 years and 7 months, Faludy became the youngest undergraduate at the University of Cambridge since the arrival there of William Pitt the Younger in 1773.

Faludy has dyslexia and developmental coordination disorder (dyspraxia). In August 1998, Faludy's parents lost a battle in the High Court of Justice which sought to force Portsmouth City Council to assess their son for special educational needs. However, the council announced it would help him financially through its Student Awards system, with money for books and specialist equipment and with a disability student award grant to pay for a personal helper.

In 2000, while studying art history and theology at Peterhouse, Faludy received a prize as best arts journalist in the Cambridge Student Journalism Awards. After Cambridge, Faludy went on to graduate studies in theology at University of Oxford, then trained for the priesthood at College of the Resurrection, Mirfield, and served as parish priest in the Diocese of Newcastle, 2008 - 2018. In 2018 he was pursuing studies in law. As of 2024, he was working as a freelance journalist. He has written against the appropriation of Christian democracy by Hungary's prime minister, Viktor Orbán, as well as the efforts of the Hungarian government media to influence the arts.
