= Hear My Cry (film) =

- Polish: Usłyszcie mój krzyk
- Directed by: Maciej Drygas
- Screenplay by: Maciej Drygas
- Produced by: Zbigniew Grefkowicz
- Cinematography: Stanisław Śliskowski
- Edited by: Dorota Wardęszkiewicz
- Production companies: Studio Filmowe Logos, Zespół Filmowy "Zodiak"
- Distributed by: TVP
- Release date: May 1991 (Poland)
- Running time: 46 minutes
- Country: Poland
- Language: Polish

Hear My Cry, (Polish: Usłyszcie mój krzyk, literally "Hear My Scream") is a 1991 Polish documentary film directed by Maciej Drygas.

== Storyline ==
The story of an ordinary accountant from south-east Poland, Ryszard Siwiec, who set himself on fire during the large harvest festival at the Warsaw stadium in 1968. He did it to protest against the military invasion in Czechoslovakia.

== Production ==
The film's director, Maciej Drygas, first learned of Ryszard Siwiec in the summer of 1989 when he read an interview in Gazeta Wyborcza with Adam Macedoński who worked to further Polish-Czech relations. Drygas was currently writing a screenplay which included the story of the self-immolation of Romas Kalanta and became interested in the phenomenon and the lack of information on Siwiec's death. He started by looking through newspapers from 1968, but didn't find any information. The first clue he found was in the Central Agency of Photography where he found that two photographs of the sector in which Siwiec set himself on fire had been destroyed. He continued his search and eventually met Siwiec's wife, Maria, and her daughter Elżbieta in Przemyśl, thanks to them gaining access to the recording that Siwiec had made two days before his departure for Warsaw.

== Cast ==
- Ryszard Siwiec – Himself (archive footage)
- Maria Siwiec – Herself
- Innocenta Siwiec – Herself
- Elżbieta Siwiec – Herself
- Wit Siwiec – Himself
- Adam Siwiec – Himself
- Mariusz Siwiec – Himself
- Maria Wojciechowska – Herself
- Tadeusz Kamiński – Himself
- Jan Janiszewski – Himself
- Zbigniew Wojciechowski – Himself
- Grażyna Niezgoda – Herself
- Zbigniew Skoczek – Himself
- Stanisława Końska – Herself
- Michał Szymłowski – Himself
- Jan Dyjak – Himself
- Leszek Łożyński – Himself
- Hubert Uszyński – Himself
- Halina Łagowska – Herself
- Józef Tischner – Himself

== Awards and accolades ==
| Date | Ceremony | Category | Recipient(s) | Result | Ref. |
|---|---|---|---|---|---|
| 9 December 2017 | 3rd European Film Awards | Best Documentary | Hear My Cry | Won | |
