= Recsk =

- Large village
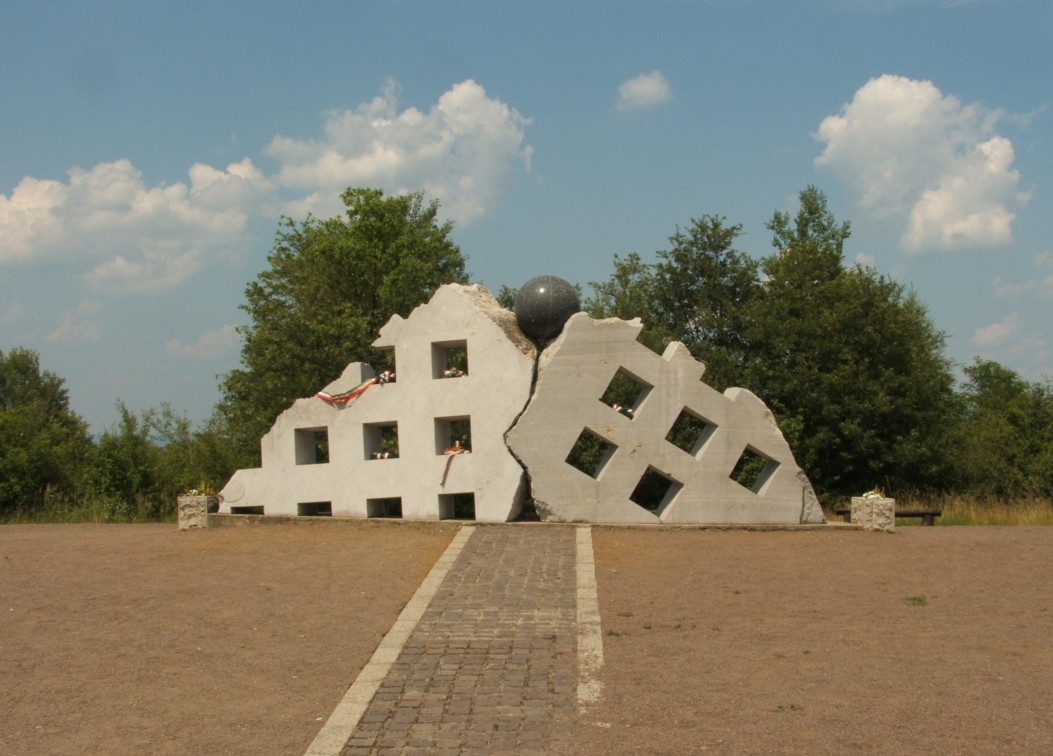
- Recsk National Memorial Park

- Coat of arms

- Location in Hungary
- Coordinates: 47°56′02″N 20°06′40″E
- Country: Hungary
- County: Heves
- District: Pétervására
- First mentioned: 1329

Government
  - Mayor: Sámdor Nagy (Ind.)

Area
  - Total: 45.37 km^{2} (17.52 sq mi)

Population (2022)
  - Total: 2,497
  - Density: 55.04/km^{2} (142.5/sq mi)
- Time zone: UTC+1 (CET)
  - Summer (DST): UTC+2 (CEST)
- Postal code: 3245
- Area code: 36
- Website: www.recsk.hu

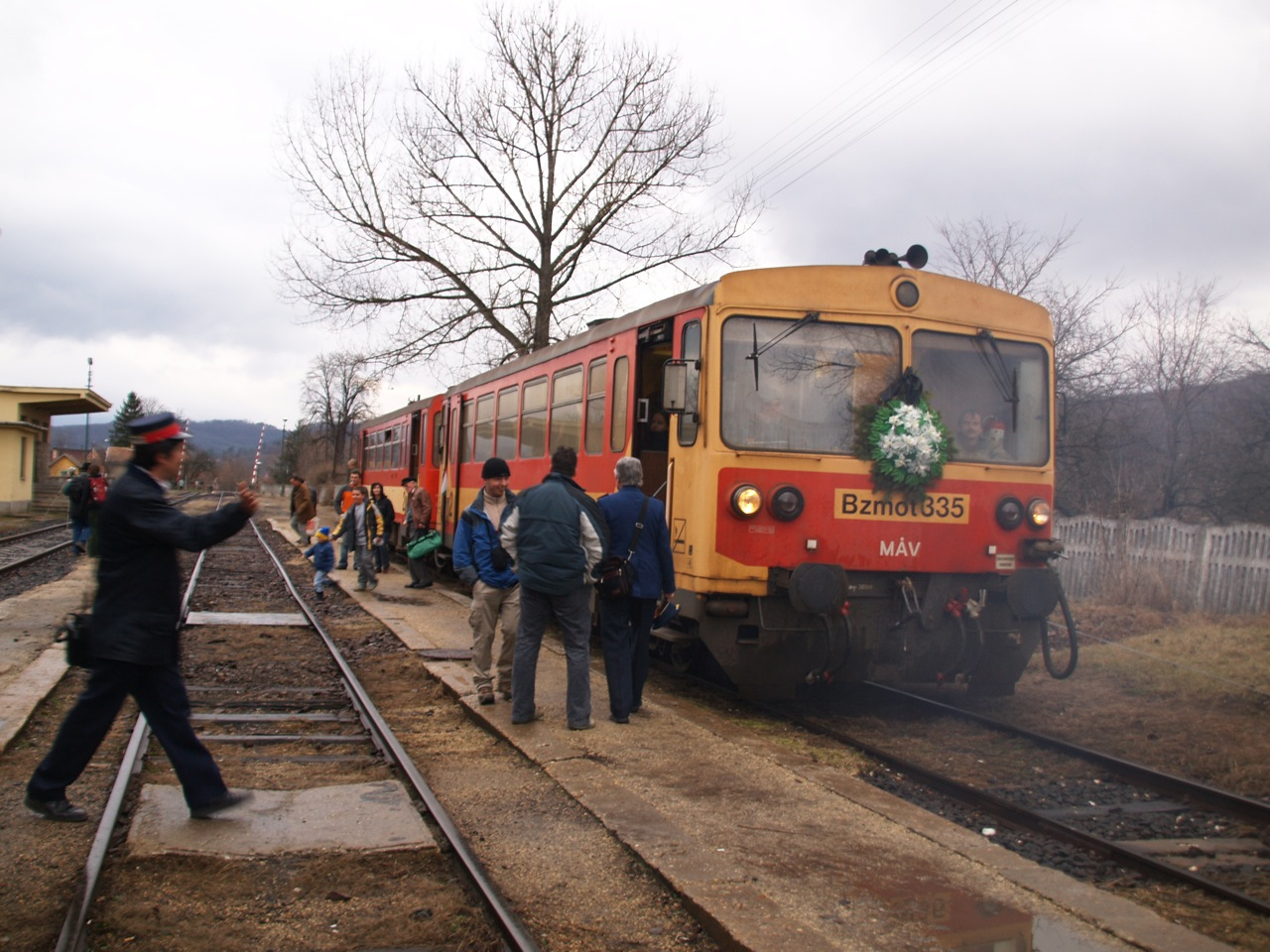
One of the last trains to Kál-Kápolna on 3 March in 2007

Recsk is a large village in Heves County, Hungary, under the Mátra mountain range, beside of the Parádi-Tarna creek. As of 2022 census, it has a population of 2497 (see Demographics). The village located beside of the (Nr. 84) Kisterenye–Kál-Kápolna railway line, 27.5 km from the main road 3 and 32.0 km from the M25 expressway. Although the settlement has its own railway station, public transport on the railway line ceased on 3 March 2007. The closest train station with public transport is in Bátonyterenye 27.2 km away.

== History ==
The first documented mention of the settlement dates from 1329, when it was mentioned as Rexy and the landlord was Demeter Recsky. The name of the village appears as Rekch in 1478. 4 ports were counted in the Ottoman tax censuses. During 1700-1701, John II Almásy and Ádám Vay acquired property rights, but even in the 1720s only 13 serf families lived in the village. The owners of the area in the 18th century were the Orczys, Recsky, Kubinyi, Lipthay, Boronkay, Tahy families, who were later replaced by the Károlyi's and Barkóczy's. In the middle of the 19th century, most of the village was owned by Ferenc Repeczky. The population increased, mainly due to the start of ore mining. The first church was built in 1696, the present-day St. George church was built in 1891, based on the plans of István Kiss and known for its gilded copper monstrance. At the beginning of the 20th century, emigration was significant, a Hungarian-language paper from Cleveland lists 873 emigrants from Recsk in 1912. The neighboring Mátraderecske became independent from Recsk in 1921.
The copper mine played an important role in the life of the settlement. Ferenc Markhot, Heves county medical officer, established that the alum spring in Parád originates from ore rocks. Ore exploration and production began at Vörösvár, Fehérkő and Hegyestető in 1780. Copper deposits were found in the lower reaches of the Baj stream and on the Lahóca hill, which boosted production in 1849. The Parád-Mátra Mining Company was founded in 1852, which began mining and research work on the siliceous clay mineral, sulphide-strewn outcrops. The Mátra Mining Association continued research from 1862 in the southern part of Lahóca, and then they built an ore processing plant, a roasting plant and a smelting plant. Technical and economic problems made extraction difficult. Gold-rich pyrite ore bodies related to blue shale were discovered in 1925, so a flotation plant was built. At the end of 1926, the state bought the mine. The mine closed in 1979. After 1991, new research began, which was stopped after 1997 due to the drop in the world market price of gold. In 1998, the deep mine was flooded with water. Recsk represents one of the largest copper reserves in Hungary and in the world, having an estimated reserve of 770 million tonnes of ore grading 0.65% copper.

== Recsk National Memorial Park ==
In the summer of 1950, the Hungarian State Protection Authority established a punitive forced labor camp modeled after the Soviet Gulag camps without any legal authorization. Among the 1700 forced laborers were workers, intellectuals, soldiers, former landowners and politicians. The most famous imprisoned person was György Faludy. None of them were brought to trial or convicted. Forced laborers detained for political reasons built the forced labor camp themselves with multiple barbed wire fences. Barracks and camp watchtowers were built from the trees of the forest. In the andesite mine, rock was quarried with hand tools and stone was broken for road construction. They worked 12-14 hours a day while their food ration was 1000 calories. Due to starvation, he supplemented his diet with forest mushrooms, green shoots, roots, berries, lizards and snails. Due to insufficient nutrition, many lost their teeth and lost 40% of their body weight. The medical care was insufficient, they hardly had access to medicine. Many died of starvation, they lost their lives in an accident in the andesite mine, and some were shot dead by the guards. No one knows exactly where the dead were buried. During its three-year existence, the camp was hermetically sealed off from the outside world. The survivors were released in 1953 in return for a declaration of confidentiality. The camp was demolished and the place of the barracks was boarded up so that no trace would remain. The communist regime denied the existence of the camp until 1989. The survivors founded the Recsk Association in 1988. In memory of the victims, a memorial was inaugurated on the site of the camp in 1991, and then in 1996 a memorial park was created in which one of the camp's barracks and one of the watchtowers were rebuilt. The Recsk National Memorial Park is located 6 km south of the settlement.

== Demographics ==
According the 2022 census, 91.1% of the population were of Hungarian ethnicity, 9.7% were Gypsies, 0.5% were Germans and 8.7% were did not wish to answer. The religious distribution was as follows: 45.2% Roman Catholic, 2.5% Calvinist, 15.5% non-denominational, and 32.2% did not wish to answer. The Gypsies have a local nationality government. 2475 inhabitants live in the village and 52 people in 7 farms. Two other inhabited outskirts are west to the village the Ércbánya and the Kenyeres utca to 2.0 and 2.5 km with 102 and 9 inhabitants.

Population by years:

Year	1870	1880	1890	1900	1910	1920	1930	1941
Population	1745	1704	2144	2425	2382	2695	2636	2799
Year	1949	1960	1970	1980	1990	2001	2011	2022
Population	2824	3499	3496	3452	3333	3094	2850	2497

== Politics ==
Mayors since 1990:

- 1990–2002: József Fekete (SZDSZ, between 1990-1994 supported by the MDF and the FKgP too)
- 2002–2010: Imre Holló (MSZP)
- 2010–2014: István Pócs (independent)
- 2014–: Sándor Nagy (until 2019 Jobbik, but from 2019 independent)
