= Yoav Shamir =

Israeli documentary filmmaker

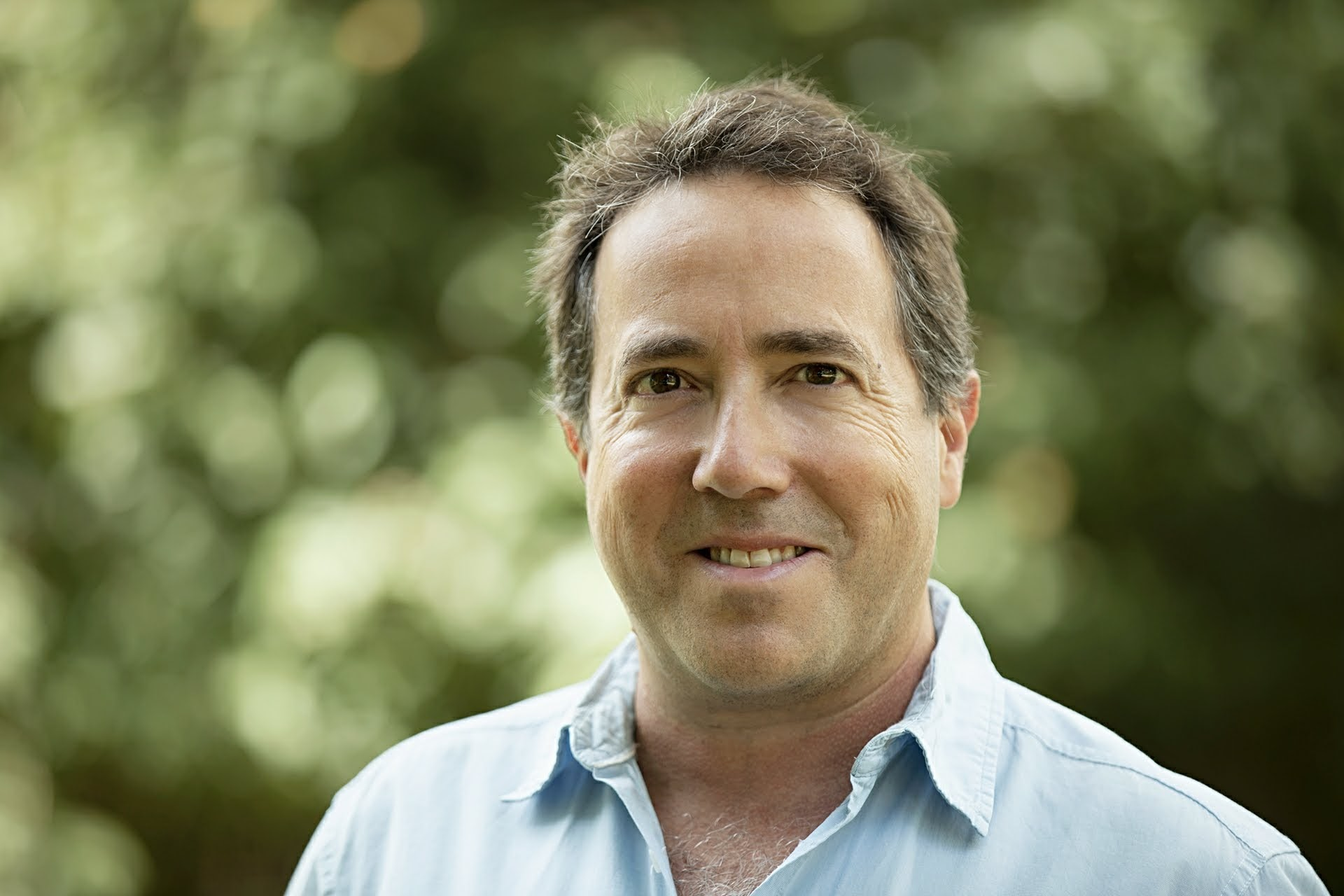
Image of Yoav Shamir

Yoav Shamir (Hebrew: יואב שמיר) is an Israeli documentary filmmaker most noted for the films Checkpoint and Defamation.

== Personal life ==
Yoav Shamir was born in Tel Aviv in 1970. A ninth-generation Israeli from Tel Aviv, he is the son of two elementary school teachers. He graduated from Tel Aviv University with a BA in History and philosophy. He obtained a MFA in cinema with honours. He served as an Israeli soldier in the Israeli-occupied territories.

== Career ==
Shamir's films have received awards from independent film festivals including Best Feature Documentary at the International Documentary Film Festival Amsterdam, Best International Documentary at the Hot Docs Canadian International Documentary Festival, and the Golden Gate Award for Documentary Feature at the San Francisco International Film Festival.

Shamir's documentaries made him a focal point of criticism and garnered accusations of antisemitism. After the success of Checkpoint, Shamir was referred to as the "Israeli Mel Gibson" by American journalists and accused of antisemitism, a fact that he described as "total nonsense and a very offensive term for me". This inspired him to do a project about contemporary antisemitism, the film Defamation.

His latest film, 10%: What Makes a Hero?, is focused on the premise that a small minority of people, less than 10%, will always fight for what is just regardless of circumstance.

== Filmography ==
- Machssomim (International title: Checkpoint) (2003)
- 5 Days (2005)
- Flipping Out (2007)
- Hashmatsa (International title: Defamation) (2008)
- Full Gas (2010)
- 10%: What Makes a Hero? (2013)
- The Prophet and the Space Aliens (2020) Documentary about Raëlism.
