= Defamation (film) =

2009 Israeli documentary film

- השמצה
- Directed by: Yoav Shamir
- Produced by: Sandra Itkoff; Karoline Leth; Philippa Kowarsky; Knut Ogris
- Distributed by: First Run Features
- Release dates: February 5, 2009 (Berlinale); November 20, 2009 (United States)
- Running time: 91 minutes
- Country: Israel
- Languages: English; Hebrew

Defamation (Hebrew: השמצה; translit. Hashmatsa) is a 2009 documentary film by Israeli filmmaker Yoav Shamir. It examines antisemitism, the way perceptions of antisemitism affect Israeli and U.S. politics, and explores the suggestion that claims of antisemitism are exaggerated or weaponized to stifle dissent against Israel. A major focus of the film is the Anti-Defamation League. Defamation won Best Documentary Feature Film at the 2009 Asia Pacific Screen Awards.

== Content ==
The film examines whether antisemitic has become an all purpose label for anyone who criticizes Israel and the idea that some Jews' preoccupation with the past—i.e., the Holocaust—is preventing progress today. Shamir decided to make Defamation after a critic of an earlier film accused him of antisemitism.

Filmmaker Yoav Shamir states in the beginning of the film that as an Israeli he has never experienced antisemitism himself and wants to learn more about it since references to antisemitism in countries all over the world are common in the Israeli media.

The film includes interviews with Abraham Foxman, the head of the Anti-Defamation League, John J. Mearsheimer, co-author of New York Times best seller The Israel Lobby and U.S. Foreign Policy, Norman Finkelstein, a critic of Israeli government policy, as well as many other individuals. Defamation follows a group of Israeli high school students on a class trip to Poland where they tour Auschwitz, as well as a number of other notable Holocaust locations.

The film says that in 2007, the ADL reported a spike in antisemitism, claiming that there were 1,500 antisemitic incidents in the United States, yet when Shamir contacts the ADL they can only list minor incidents such as websites with inflammatory comments, letters from employees denied time off for a Jewish holiday, or people offended by a cop's use of the word "Jew." A case presented concerns about a group of African American boys, ages between 10 and 12, who pelted a school bus with rocks, breaking two windows.

Shamir interviews a rabbi who says that the hypervigilance of the ADL inflames relations between Jews and non-Jews in the United States. He finds that among his interviewees there is more sensitivity to antisemitism among secular Jews than religious ones.

== Reception ==
After it was screened at the Tribeca Film Festival, the Anti-Defamation League's Abraham Foxman issued a statement denouncing the film, stating that it "belittles the issue (of antisemitism) ... and cheapens the Holocaust. It is Shamir's perverse, personal, political perspective and a missed opportunity to document a serious and important issue."

The New York Times reviewer Neil Genzlinger states that while these ideas deserve a thorough and dispassionate discussion, Shamir has not provided it: "it feels like just another day on the Op-Ed page." The Boston Globe reviewer Ty Burr wrote "Unlike many agit-docs, Defamation wants to get you thinking, and it knows the epithet "self-hating Jew" can be used as a club by those who don't want you to think at all." His review was positive, highlighting how the film argues that raising "Israelis to define themselves as a nation of victims ... is a disservice to modern complexities—and, not coincidentally, makes it almost impossible to see any other people as victims." The review in the Los Angeles Times praised the documentary for showing "how accusations of anti-Semitism can easily be exploited for political purposes." The reviewer commended the filmmaker for his fairness writing that "even though Defamation, which is sprinkled with unexpected moments of wry humor, will be inescapably controversial, Yoav Shamir strives admirably to be evenhanded."

In an interview for The Jerusalem Post about criticism on the film, Shamir said: "At the end of Defamation both Finkelstein and Foxman were cross with me. I felt like I did a good job".
