= Checkpoint (2003 film) =

- Directed by: Yoav Shamir
- Produced by: Amit Breuer; Edna Kowarsky; Elinor Kowarsky
- Cinematography: Yoav Shamir
- Edited by: Era Lapid
- Release dates: November 23, 2003 (Amsterdam International Documentary Film Festival)
- Running time: 80 minutes
- Country: Israel
- Languages: Hebrew, Arabic, English

Checkpoint (original title: Machssomim) is a 2003 documentary film by Israeli filmmaker Yoav Shamir, showing the everyday interaction between Israeli soldiers and Palestinian civilians at several of the region's Israel Defense Forces checkpoints. The film won five awards at various film festivals, including Best International Documentary at the Hot Docs Canadian International Documentary Festival, best feature-length documentary at the International Documentary Film Festival Amsterdam, and the Golden Gate Award for Documentary Feature at the San Francisco International Film Festival. Although the film was generally well received, the depictions of the check points were controversial and provoked strong reactions.

The film was produced with the support of The New Israeli Foundation for Cinema and Television.

== Synopsis ==
Checkpoint is shot in cinéma vérité style with no narration and very little context. Shamir himself is absent from the film except for one scene in which a border guard asks him to try to make him "look good," and Shamir asks how he should do that.

The camera films the people trying to cross at various checkpoints. At some checkpoints, such as the high-tech fortress at the Gaza Strip crossing, there are hundreds of people crowded and waiting to get through. At other checkpoints, such as South Jenin, there is just a truck blocking the road while people trickle by. Interactions vary, sometimes people show their identification cards without incident, but much of what Shamir has chosen to include are the more confrontational incidents. The film shows a school bus full of children pass several times at South Jenin. The bus driver says that every day the bus is emptied and told that it cannot proceed. In another instance, a family is separated at the checkpoint because a border guard does not see the need for the father to accompany his family to the doctor because he is not sick. Several similar situations are portrayed in this film. Although sometimes it seems the soldiers are obviously taunting the people they are monitoring, it often seems that they are following arbitrary orders that are outside their control. A common source of tension between parties at the checkpoints is the language barrier between guards and civilians. The entire film is spoken in patches of Arabic, Hebrew and English.

== Significance ==
Checkpoint is a part of the independent digital documentary movement in the early 2000s, in part due to the introduction of relatively inexpensive digital tape-based video cameras and the sudden affordability of powerful desktop video editing systems. This in-the-trenches filmmaking lent itself to direct cinema, or cinéma vérité, a definition that spans from reality television to the Pennebaker films of the 1960s. This approach is evident in the popular documentaries in the 2000s such as Fahrenheit 9/11 and Super Size Me, which while driven by narrative and personal point of view, deploy a camera style which draws on the vérité trope of letting reality play out before the camera. Recalled as The Year of the Documentary, these films came out in 2004 during a convergence of new media possibilities and world conflict including 9/11 and the rising tensions in the Middle East during the Second Intifada, according to Paul Falzone in his dissertation, Documentary of Change. "From this conflict emerges a generation of muckraking filmmakers and a new style of documenting filmmaking," wrote Falzone. Maxine Baker in her book, Documenting in the Digital Age goes a bit further. She refers to the digital revolution as no less as explosive as the Lumiere Brothers’ invention of the cinematograph during the turn of the 19th century. According to Falzone, a specific kind of documentary was forged by filmmakers looking to challenge mainstream media's interpretation of events. She observed that this new batch of films tended to replace the protagonist with antagonist. In Checkpoint’s case, the director Shamir replaced the antagonist with the subject, who in turn served as the antagonist. While the director may have omitted narration or any stated point of view, he adheres to the vérité technique of hammering home a focused point. Checkpoint follows the looming sense of futility from shutting down access between two groups of people. In an interview with Documentary Film Quarterly in 2004, Shamir says, "Everybody is like a victim; the soldiers, the Palestinians. I want to show what effects the occupation has on the Palestinians but even more what the effects are on society."

== Awards ==
The film received five festival awards, including Best Feature Documentary at the International Documentary Film Festival Amsterdam, Best International Feature Documentary at the 2004 Hot Docs Canadian International Documentary Festival, and the Golden Gate Award for Documentary Feature at the San Francisco International Film Festival.

== Bibliography ==
Zanger, Anat. "Blind Space: Roadblock Movies in the Contemporary Film." Shofar: An Interdisciplinary Journal of Jewish Studies 24.1 (2005): 37–48. American University Library. Web.
