= Amy Fisher: My Story =

- Written by: Phil Penningroth
- Directed by: Bradford May
- Starring: Ed Marinaro; Noelle Parker; Boyd Kestner; Pierrette Grace; Lawrence Dane; Kate Lynch; Kathleen Laskey
- Composer: Fred Mollin
- Country of origin: United States
- Original language: English

Production
- Producers: Howard Braunstein; John Danylkiw; Phillip Levitan
- Cinematography: Bradford May
- Editor: Ron Wisman
- Running time: 93 minutes
- Production companies: Jaffe/Braunstein Films; KLM Productions; Spectacor Films

Original release
- Network: NBC
- Release: December 28, 1992

Amy Fisher: My Story is a 1992 American drama film directed by Bradford May and written by Phil Penningroth. The film stars Ed Marinaro, Noelle Parker, Boyd Kestner, Pierrette Grace, Lawrence Dane, Kate Lynch and Kathleen Laskey. The film premiered on NBC on December 28, 1992.

It is one of three television films produced based on the story of Amy Fisher's affair with Joey Buttafuoco, and her conviction for aggravated assault for shooting Buttafuoco's wife. The other two being The Amy Fisher Story and Casualties of Love: The "Long Island Lolita" Story, both broadcast in 1993.

== Plot ==
Told from the viewpoint of teen Amy Fisher who claims Joey Buttafuoco seduced her, prostituted her, and coerced her into killing his wife.

== Cast ==
- Ed Marinaro as Joey Buttafuoco
- Noelle Parker as Amy Fisher
- Boyd Kestner as Paul Makely
- Pierrette Grace as Crystal
- Lawrence Dane as Elliot Fisher
- Kate Lynch as Roseann Fisher
- Kathleen Laskey as Mary Jo
- Rino Romano as Mick
- Gemma Barry as Theresa
- Kirsten Kieferle as Ellen
- Tyley Ross as Tom
- Henriette Ivanans as Darlene
- Marianna Pascal as Aunt Violet
- Jason Blicker as Darren
- Lynn MacKenzie as Linda
- Mario Di Iorio as Bobby
- Jack Jessop as Joseph
- Jessica Booker as Josephine
