= Babak Azizzadeh =

American facial plastic & reconstructive surgeon

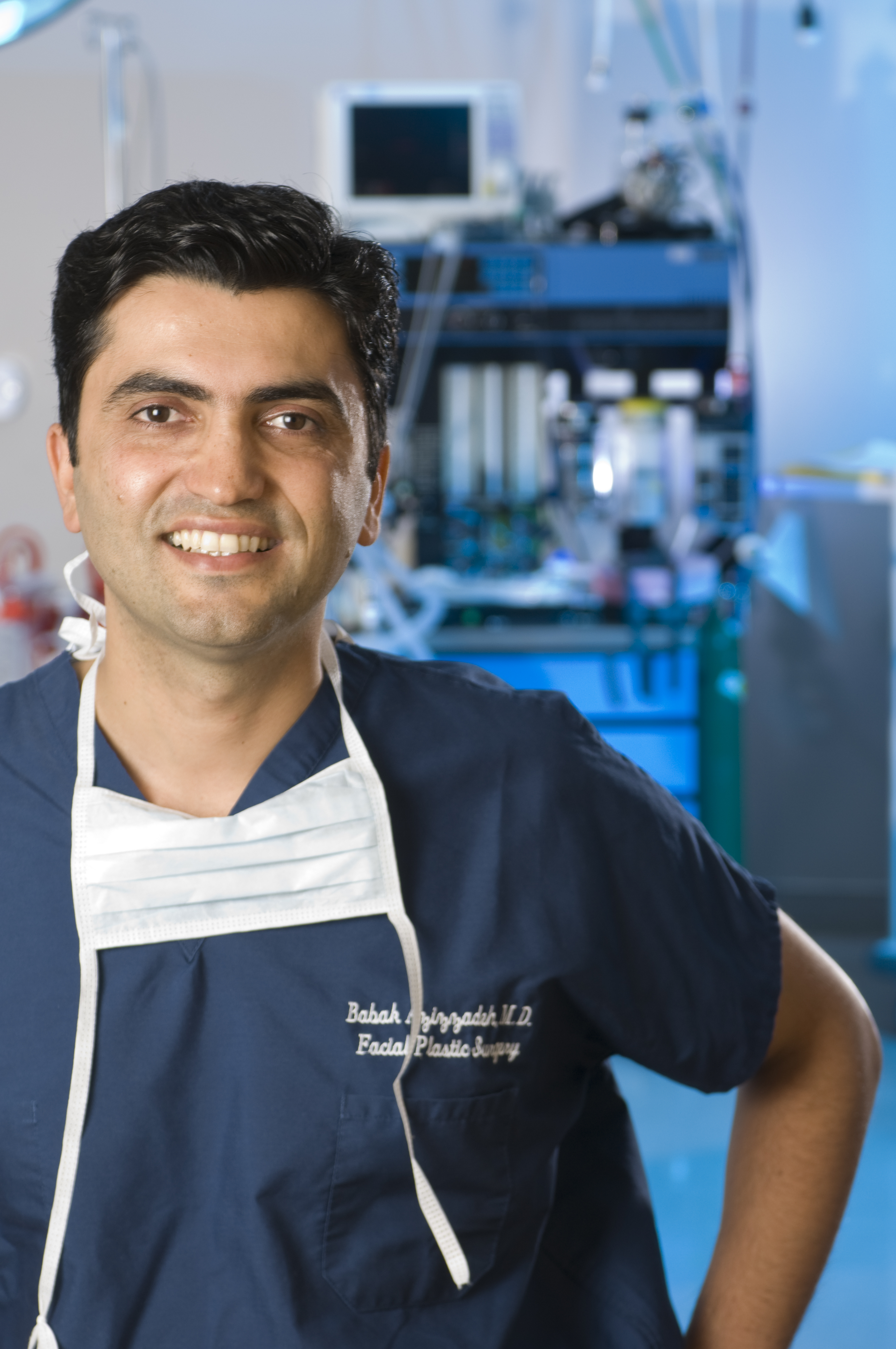
- Education: University of California, Los Angeles (B.S.) David Geffen School of Medicine at UCLA (M.D.)
- Occupations: Facial plastic surgery and reconstructive surgeon; otolaryngologist
- Known for: Facial reanimation and facial nerve surgery
- Website: www.facialplasticsbh.com

Babak Azizzadeh is an American facial plastic and reconstructive surgeon and otolaryngologist based in Beverly Hills, California. He is Clinical Chief of Otolaryngology–Head and Neck Surgery at Cedars-Sinai Medical Center and an Associate Clinical Professor at the David Geffen School of Medicine at UCLA. He is president-elect of the American Academy of Facial Plastic and Reconstructive Surgery (AAFPRS) and president of the Sir Charles Bell Society, an international society for facial nerve specialists. As president-elect he sits on the Academy's Executive Committee.

Azizzadeh's work centers on disorders of the facial nerve and facial reanimation. He founded The Facial Paralysis Institute (the Institute), a Beverly Hills treatment center, and the Facial Paralysis & Bell's Palsy Foundation (the Foundation), a non-profit organization focused on the treatment of people with facial nerve paralysis and Bell's palsy. He has edited textbooks and journal issues on facial plastic surgery and facial nerve disorders, has co-authored peer-reviewed research, and co-founded the clinical research company MACRO Trials.

== Early life and education ==
Azizzadeh earned a B.S. in microbiology and molecular genetics, summa cum laude and Phi Beta Kappa, from the University of California, Los Angeles, in 1992, and an M.D. from the David Geffen School of Medicine at UCLA in 1996, where he was elected to the Alpha Omega Alpha medical honor society. He completed a general surgery rotating internship at UCLA in 1996 and 1997, followed by a residency in otolaryngology–head and neck surgery in the UCLA Division of Head and Neck Surgery from 1998 to 2002, according to his curriculum vitae; the U.S. News physician directory lists the residency as 1996 to 2002. He then completed a postgraduate fellowship in facial plastic and reconstructive surgery at Harvard Medical School from 2002 to 2003, with an emphasis on the facial nerve and facial reanimation. He was chief resident at UCLA in 2002 and received the division's Outstanding Resident Teaching Award. Earlier biographical material also described his surgical training as taking place at Harvard Medical School, Cedars-Sinai Medical Center, and UCLA; his Cedars-Sinai role began as an attending surgeon in 2003.

== Academic and clinical career ==
=== UCLA and Harvard ===
Azizzadeh joined the faculty of the David Geffen School of Medicine at UCLA in 2003 as an Assistant Clinical Professor of Surgery in the Division of Head and Neck Surgery. According to his curriculum vitae he was promoted to Associate Clinical Professor in 2011, the rank he holds in the Department of Head and Neck Surgery, and the Sir Charles Bell Society lists him by that rank. Elsevier's author biography for a book published in December 2014 still gave his rank as Assistant Clinical Professor of Surgery. From 2003 to 2011 he also held an appointment as Clinical Instructor in facial plastic and reconstructive surgery at Harvard Medical School. Since 2018 he has served on the UCLA Faculty Executive Committee, Volunteer Faculty Subcommittee. He was a visiting professor at the Department of Otolaryngology–Head and Neck Surgery at UT Southwestern Medical Center in May 2020.

=== Cedars-Sinai ===
Azizzadeh has been an attending surgeon in facial plastic and reconstructive surgery at Cedars-Sinai Medical Center since 2003, according to his curriculum vitae, and the AAFPRS fellowship handbook and the U.S. News physician directory list him as an attending surgeon in the Division of Otolaryngology there. He serves as Clinical Chief of the Division of Otolaryngology–Head and Neck Surgery in the Department of Surgery. Cedars-Sinai lists him as fellowship director of the AAFPRS Fellowship Program, an AAFPRS-accredited facial plastic and reconstructive surgery fellowship (described under Surgical education and mentoring). He has co-directed the annual Cedars-Sinai Multispecialty Aesthetic and Reconstructive Surgery Symposium since the mid-2000s.

=== Private practice ===
Azizzadeh directs the CENTER for Advanced Facial Plastic Surgery in Beverly Hills and co-owns La Peer Health Systems, a medical organization offering plastic and reconstructive surgery. His practice includes facial rejuvenation, rhinoplasty, and facial reconstruction. He is board certified by the American Board of Facial Plastic and Reconstructive Surgery and the American Board of Otolaryngology.

== Leadership and professional appointments ==
=== American Academy of Facial Plastic and Reconstructive Surgery ===
Azizzadeh has held several positions in the AAFPRS, a national medical society for otolaryngologists and plastic surgeons. His service has included membership of the Academy's Membership and Residency Relations Committee, Multimedia Committee, CME Committee, Emerging Trends and Technology Committee, Regulatory and Socioeconomic Affairs Committee, and Strategic Development Committee, and he has chaired and served as senior advisor to the Specialty Surgery Committee's Microvascular and Reconstructive Surgery Subcommittee. He has been a member of the Academy's Face to Face Homeland Response Team.

His principal positions in the Academy, in approximate chronological order and distinguishing former from current roles, are:

- Fellowship director, from 2010, of an AAFPRS-accredited facial plastic and reconstructive surgery fellowship program. This is a training-program role rather than an Academy office, and the sources describing it are discussed under Surgical education and mentoring.
- Chair of the Specialty Surgery Committee's Microvascular and Reconstructive Surgery Subcommittee from 2013 to 2015, and senior advisor to it from 2015.
- Former Western Regional Director and member of the Board of Directors, from 2022. His April 2024 curriculum vitae lists both roles as ongoing, his practice biography describes the Western Regional Director role as one he previously held, and the Academy's current leadership page lists a different Western Regional Director. No source located gives the end date of his term.
- Co-chair of the AAFPRS Annual Fall Meeting in 2023, held in Las Vegas, during his term as Western Regional Director.
- Current President-elect and member of the Academy's Executive Committee.

=== Sir Charles Bell Society ===
The Sir Charles Bell Society is an international professional society devoted to the facial nerve and its disorders, with members and leaders drawn from several countries. Azizzadeh was originally listed as a member. He has served as its president and as a member of its board of directors since 2022. The society is associated with the International Facial Nerve Symposium, which is held every four years. In 2017 Azizzadeh was co-chair, with neurotologist William H. Slattery III, of the 13th International Facial Nerve Symposium, held from 3 to 6 August 2017 at the Loews Hollywood Hotel in Los Angeles. The symposium was sponsored by the House Ear Institute and the Foundation, and its program included sessions on facial reanimation, eyelid reconstruction, botulinum toxin for facial palsy, and a day for patients. Azizzadeh presented seven papers or panels at the symposium and, in 2022, gave a keynote lecture and won the best video presentation award at the 14th International Facial Nerve Symposium.

=== Other professional memberships ===
Azizzadeh is a fellow of the American College of Surgeons and a member of the American Academy of Otolaryngology–Head and Neck Surgery, the American Medical Association, the California Society of Facial Plastic Surgery (board of directors since 2019), the California Medical Association, the Los Angeles County Medical Association, and the Los Angeles Society of Otolaryngology–Head and Neck Surgery. He is also a member of the European Academy of Facial Plastic and Reconstructive Surgery and of the Microvascular Committee, Facial Nerve Group, of the American Academy of Otolaryngology–Head and Neck Surgery, and is listed as an honorary member of the Spanish Society of Facial Plastic Surgery.

== Facial nerve research and clinical contributions ==
Azizzadeh founded the Institute, a Beverly Hills center for the treatment of facial nerve disorders, and serves as its director. He has worked as a facial reanimation surgeon at the House Clinic Center for Facial Nerve Function in Los Angeles, a center directed by William H. Slattery III, who also collaborates with the Institute. The Institute lists parotid tumors, Möbius syndrome, and Bell's palsy among the conditions it treats. Azizzadeh is among the few surgeons in the United States who perform repair of facial paralysis.

The Institute's biography of Azizzadeh states that his initiatives established the first facial nerve center in South America, and publisher biographies of his books credit him with establishing multidisciplinary facial nerve centers internationally. The Sir Charles Bell Society's biography describes a narrower contribution, saying that he developed a pro bono facial nerve program in Ecuador and Peru, and the AAFPRS fellowship handbook states that fellows may travel with him and Peng to South America through the Global Smile Foundation for craniofacial and facial reanimation missions. He has also traveled to Southern and Central America to treat children with craniofacial deformities, and has lectured to plastic surgery societies in Mexico, El Salvador, and Spain.

Cedars-Sinai lists management of post-facial paralysis synkinesis, facial reanimation, and facial rejuvenation among his research areas. With Charles Nduka he edited the 2021 textbook Management of Post-Facial Paralysis Synkinesis, which covers assessment, grading, and surgical and non-surgical management of synkinesis and describes a surgical approach to lower facial synkinesis that he developed. In 2024 he and Richard J. Lu published a review of facial nerve anatomy relevant to deep plane facelift and neck lift surgery.

An early reconstructive case that drew national media attention was his treatment of Mary Jo Buttafuoco, who had facial paralysis and ear damage after being shot in the face on May 19, 1992. Azizzadeh described a staged procedure that included an asymmetric facelift, eyelid surgery, and a procedure to widen the ear canal, combined with physical therapy, and told ABC News that the aim was to even out her face and suspend the drooping corner of her mouth.

== Research and publications ==
According to publisher and institutional biographies, Azizzadeh has published more than 80 peer-reviewed scientific articles and has been lead editor of more than ten plastic surgery textbooks. Some profiles give higher totals, stating more than 100 peer-reviewed publications and a dozen textbooks. His April 2024 curriculum vitae lists 64 papers under peer-reviewed research, 28 non-peer-reviewed scientific publications, 19 book chapters, and twelve editorships of multi-author texts, one of them in progress. His selected research is summarized below.

=== Nitric oxide and microvascular thrombosis ===
As a resident, Azizzadeh received a 2001 AAFPRS Resident Research Grant for a project on the role of nitric oxide in acute microvascular thrombosis, and a research grant from the James Bashor Research Foundation for work on nitric oxide in head and neck surgery.The work was done with Louis J. Ignarro, who shared the 1998 Nobel Prize in Physiology or Medicine for work on nitric oxide as a signaling molecule in the cardiovascular system, with Robert F. Furchgott and Ferid Murad. Ignarro is a co-author of several of the resulting papers, including a 2001 Laryngoscope study of whether nitric oxide improves cisplatin cytotoxicity in head and neck squamous cell carcinoma and a 2003 paper in Archives of Facial Plastic Surgery on which Azizzadeh was first author. The 2003 paper, "Inhibitors of nitric oxide promote microvascular thrombosis," began from the observation that most free flap failures are initiated by platelet-mediated clotting at microvascular anastomoses, and that nitric oxide helps prevent such clotting by inhibiting platelet adhesion and aggregation. Its research question was the role of nitric oxide in microvascular thrombosis, which the authors tested in a rabbit model of arterial-graft-induced thrombosis. It reported that intravenous nitric oxide inhibitors appeared to increase the short-term rate of thrombosis, while the nitric oxide precursor L-arginine did not produce a statistically different rate from controls. The authors concluded that nitric oxide plays a role in microvascular anastomotic thrombosis and that the results may have applications to human microvascular surgery.

=== Gracilis free flap and facial reanimation ===
In 2015 Azizzadeh and colleagues published an article in the Journal of Craniofacial Surgery on the gracilis free flap in head and neck reconstruction. Its subtitle describes it as a historical overview of uses of the flap outside of facial reanimation. Free transfer of the gracilis muscle, introduced in 1971, is the most widely used procedure for long-standing flaccid facial paralysis, using a neurotized muscle transferred by microsurgery to restore a smile. A 2023 systematic review and meta-analysis of donor-nerve strategies found that most studies used a cross-face nerve graft as the first choice, with the motor nerve to the masseter used mainly in bilateral palsy and in older patients. Azizzadeh's own 2016 chapter with K. J. Pettijohn, "The Gracilis Free Flap," in Facial Plastic Surgery Clinics of North America, discusses the anatomy of the gracilis muscle, alternative neural sources including the masseteric nerve, and technical aspects of the procedure, and advocates a two-stage operation, a cross-face nerve graft followed by inset of the flap, for patients with a viable contralateral facial nerve. His CV also lists conference presentations on gracilis transfer in an ambulatory surgery center. His profile in the Newsweek ranking lists facial reanimation combining gracilis transfer, selective neurolysis, and botulinum toxin among his specialties. In 2015 he also co-authored a study of the genetics of congenital facial paralysis, with a focus on Moebius syndrome.

=== Modified selective neurectomy for synkinesis ===
In 2019 Azizzadeh and colleagues reported in Plastic and Reconstructive Surgery on "modified selective neurectomy," a procedure on the buccal and cervical divisions of the facial nerve that the senior author (Azizzadeh) had offered as a long-term treatment for smile dysfunction in patients with post-facial paralysis synkinesis, a condition in which regenerating nerve fibers reinnervate the wrong muscles. The authors concluded that the procedure was an effective long-term treatment. The Institute describes the technique, which it also calls selective neurolysis, as his innovation, and a later textbook describes a new surgical approach to lower facial synkinesis that he developed. Later systematic reviews have evaluated selective neurectomy for post-facial paralysis synkinesis.

=== The eFACE grading scale ===
The electronic clinician-graded facial paralysis assessment, known as eFACE, was developed and described in 2015 by Caroline A. Banks, P. K. Bhama, J. Park, C. R. Hadlock, and Tessa A. Hadlock, as a digital instrument for assessing facial function; the authors' institutions include Massachusetts Eye and Ear. Azizzadeh was not an author of the development paper. Azizzadeh's involvement came later, as one of 20 co-authors of a 2017 study in Plastic and Reconstructive Surgery that introduced eFACE to experienced facial nerve clinicians worldwide. Participants rated videos of 30 patients with facial palsy, and the study examined whether watching a tutorial improved agreement. The authors concluded that eFACE may be a suitable, cross-platform digital instrument for facial function assessment that was well received by facial nerve experts.

=== Deep plane facelift and revision facelift ===
Azizzadeh has coauthored publications addressing facial nerve anatomy and preservation during deep plane facelift surgery, extended deep plane techniques, and structural neck contouring. In 2024 he and Richard J. Lu published "Facial Nerve Considerations for the Deep Plane Facelift and Neck Lift" in Facial Plastic Surgery, and in 2026 VandeWater and Azizzadeh published "Extended Deep Plane Facelift and Structural Neck Contouring: Technical Considerations for Comprehensive Surgical Facial Rejuvenation" in Facial Plastic Surgery Clinics of North America. He also coauthored a review of revision facelift surgery that addresses altered facial anatomy, changes in facial nerve landmarks, and technical considerations after previous facelift and neck procedures. The article examines complications including cobra neck deformity, pixie ear deformity, and synkinesis, with attention to revision surgery following deep plane facelifts.In 2026 Azizzadeh and Neal Deot published a multilevel anatomical classification framework for facelift and neck rejuvenation surgery, "The Multilevel Facial Anatomic Classification System: A Comprehensive Framework for Contemporary Facelift and Neck Rejuvenation Surgery", in Facial Plastic Surgery & Aesthetic Medicine. The paper was accompanied by an invited commentary by Benjamin Marcus.

=== Selected publications ===
Azizzadeh has also co-authored articles on eyelid surgery, rhinoplasty, injectable fillers, and botulinum toxin.

== Academic editing and surgical education ==
=== Editing ===
Azizzadeh edited the Facial Plastic Surgery Clinics of North America issue Comprehensive Periorbital and Midface Rejuvenation. He edited issues of Clinics in Plastic Surgery on the brow and upper eyelid in 2013, the lower lid and midface in 2014, and rhinoplasty in 2015, and with Babak Larian edited a 2016 issue of Otolaryngologic Clinics of North America on parotid disorders. With William H. Slattery III he edited The Facial Nerve (Thieme, 2014), and he has edited several editions of the Master Techniques series in facial rejuvenation, rhinoplasty, and blepharoplasty. The second edition of Master Techniques in Facial Rejuvenation, which he co-edited, includes chapters on deep plane facelift surgery and modifications of deep plane rhytidectomy. His curriculum vitae also lists service on the editorial advisory board of WebMD Plastic Surgery & Aesthetic Medicine, as a founding board member of Modern Aesthetics, and as a peer reviewer for journals including Facial Plastic Surgery & Aesthetic Medicine, Head and Neck, and Aesthetic Plastic Surgery.

=== Surgical education and mentoring ===
Sources describe his fellowship role in three ways that appear to refer to one program. The AAFPRS fellowship handbook lists a single program, "Babak Azizzadeh/Grace Lee Peng," with Azizzadeh as director, Peng as co-director and Cedars-Sinai Medical Center as hospital affiliation, and describes its fellows as supervising Cedars-Sinai otolaryngology residents and presenting at the Cedars-Sinai symposium. His curriculum vitae lists the same position as director of the AAFPRS fellowship program since 2010, and Cedars-Sinai and the Sir Charles Bell Society describe him as its fellowship director or co-director. The USC description appears in the Institute's biography, which calls him co-director of the USC Facial Plastic Surgery Fellowship Program sanctioned by the AAFPRS, and in earlier biographical material that placed the co-directorship at the Keck School of Medicine of the University of Southern California. A 2024 recruitment announcement by Azizzadeh names Paul S. Nassif (clinical faculty at USC) and Peng as co-directors alongside him. No source located lists a separate USC-administered program, and none explains how the USC description relates to the Cedars-Sinai-based program. Programs in the AAFPRS Foundation's fellowship system are reviewed for accreditation by the Accreditation Council for Post-Residency Specialty Education (ACPSE), and Azizzadeh has served on the ACPSE Fellowship Review Committee since 2022. His practice biography and his member profile on the California Pacific Society of Facial Plastic Surgery website state that he has trained more than 20 facial plastic surgeons or fellows; these are self-reported figures, and his curriculum vitae lists 19 fellows from 2010–2011 through 2024–2025. He has also been clinical faculty for the American Society of Ophthalmic Plastic and Reconstructive Surgery fellowship program since 2018, and has precepted students from the Harvard-Westlake School summer internship program. He has taught residents and medical students at UCLA and Harvard, received the UCLA Outstanding Resident Teaching Award in 2002, and organizes continuing medical education courses, including the Cedars-Sinai symposium and the 2017 symposium he co-chaired.

== Clinical research initiatives ==
Azizzadeh is a co-founder of MACRO Trials, a Los Angeles-based clinical research company. Its publicly announced launch in 2023 described a clinical research platform that works with pharmaceutical companies, contract research organizations, physicians, and health systems to run trials of high-value therapeutics, using a "hub-and-spoke" distributed model that supports both in-person and decentralized studies. The company reported raising $6 million in seed funding. The company says it provides infrastructure and research personnel so that physicians and institutions can take part in FDA-regulated clinical trials, and its early trials reported higher enrollment of Hispanic participants than is typical in clinical research. Cedars-Sinai lists Azizzadeh as co-director of the Multispecialty Aesthetic Clinical Research Organization (MACRO), which focuses on FDA clinical trials, and a California Pacific Society of Facial Plastic Surgery profile gives that name for MACRO Trials, describing it as providing infrastructure for FDA-regulated clinical trials. The AAFPRS fellowship handbook describes MACRO Trials as a venture-backed clinical trial infrastructure company in which the fellowship directors are involved.

== Philanthropy ==
Azizzadeh has served as president and chair of the board of the Foundation (the Facial Paralysis & Bell's Palsy Foundation) since 2008. The Foundation describes itself as a non-profit organization that supports research in facial nerve disorders and provides pro bono surgery for patients in need. He has been a member of the craniofacial reconstruction team of Medical Missions for Children (2002 to 2011) and of the Global Smile Foundation (since 2011), and has sat on the Global Smile medical advisory board since 2017. He has also volunteered with Operation of Hope, from which he received a humanitarian award in 2009, and with Face to Face, the AAFPRS Foundation's humanitarian program, which the Academy describes as including international and domestic initiatives. His CV lists him as a member of the Academy's Face to Face Homeland Response Team. A 2008 profile in People described his surgical role in the treatment of a Zimbabwean teenager whose face was disfigured by a land mine and who was brought to California for reconstruction.

His curriculum vitae also lists membership in the reconstructive surgery program of the R.O.S.E. Fund (Regaining One's Self-Esteem), a Boston-based non-profit that arranges free facial reconstructive surgery for women survivors of domestic violence through partner hospitals in several states including California, and service as a physician participant for the Los Angeles Free Clinic. According to the same CV, he was founder and, from 1990 to 1992, president of a UCLA Flying Samaritans group. The Flying Samaritans is a volunteer organization founded in 1961 that provides free medical care in communities in Baja California.

== Recognition and media coverage ==
=== Media appearances ===
Azizzadeh's treatment of Mary Jo Buttafuoco was covered by media across the United States. Buttafuoco appeared on The Oprah Winfrey Show in November 2005 to discuss the shooting by Amy Fisher and its aftermath, and later returned with Azizzadeh, who explained the reconstructive surgery. The follow-up segment is archived on Oprah.com as "Ultimate Betrayals" and is dated 2006. A&E reports that Buttafuoco appeared on Entertainment Tonight in 2006. The Institute's website lists a segment titled "Mary Jo Story on Entertainment Tonight" among its videos, and earlier biographical material stated that Azizzadeh appeared on the program with her.

In July 2005 United Press International reported on a The New York Times article of 14 July 2005 that described his "cosmetic cocktail" regimen of combined injectable treatments. In August 2020 the newspaper quoted him in a Style section article on trends in rhinoplasty. In September 2026 The Wall Street Journal quoted him in an article by Beth Landman on lower-intervention cosmetic procedures, in which he said that the number of incisions used in endoscopic brow lifts had been reduced since the procedure was introduced and that patient interest in brow lifts at his practice had begun to surpass interest in eyelid surgery. In July 2023 he appeared on CBS CBS Mornings to discuss Bell's palsy in pregnant and postpartum women after the actress and martial artist Tiffany Chen disclosed her diagnosis, saying that people should seek emergency care promptly when facial movement changes. According to the Institute, Discovery Health is among the outlets that have featured him, and earlier biographical material stated that in 2009 he appeared on the Discovery Health Channel to discuss revision rhinoplasty. In August 2025 Town & Country reported on Azizzadeh's transition from SMAS to deep plane techniques, research he coauthored, and a patient's experience undergoing a deep plane facelift with him. In January 2026 The Hollywood Reporter described him, in a feature on deep plane facelift surgery, as "a leader in facial nerve repair and deep plane facelifts."

=== Rankings and awards ===
Newsweek lists Azizzadeh in its annual "America's Best Plastic Surgeons" ranking, produced with the data firm Statista. Newsweek and Statista included Azizzadeh in the Facelift category of the rankings in 2025 and 2026. The ranking is compiled from an online survey of thousands of medical experts, quality scores, and board certification data, and recognizes surgeons by procedure. These inputs reflect professional recommendation, quality scores, and certification, and the ranking does not independently establish clinical outcomes. His practice states that he has been listed among top plastic surgeons by U.S. News & World Report and Newsweek for more than a decade, and his society profile lists a U.S. News & World Report Top Doctor designation. Castle Connolly states that its Top Doctors are identified through physician nominations and screening by its physician-led research team, and it named him a Top Doctor in facial plastic surgery and otolaryngology for 2026. He received a humanitarian award from Operation of Hope in 2009, the UCLA Outstanding Resident Teaching Award in 2002, and the AAFPRS Resident Research Award in 2001.The Hollywood Reporter included Azizzadeh in its 2025 and 2026 cosmetic doctor selections, and its 2026 profile identifies deep plane and revision facelifts among his areas of work.

== Publications ==
=== Books ===
- Master Techniques in Facial Rejuvenation (1st ed.). With Mark R. Murphy and Calvin M. Johnson. Saunders, 2007.
- Beverly Hills Beauty Secrets. With Douglas Hamilton. Wiley, 2007 (listed as 2009 in some records). ISBN 0470294035.
- Master Techniques in Rhinoplasty (1st ed.). With Mark R. Murphy, Calvin M. Johnson Jr., and William Numa. Saunders, 2011. ISBN 1416062629.
- Master Techniques in Blepharoplasty and Periorbital Rejuvenation. With Guy G. Massry and Mark R. Murphy. Springer, 2011. ISBN 146140066X.
- Azizzadeh B, Massry G, eds. Multispecialty Approach to Brow and Upper Eyelid Surgery. Clinics in Plastic Surgery. Elsevier, 2013.
- Slattery WH, Azizzadeh B, eds. The Facial Nerve. Thieme, 2014.
- Azizzadeh B, ed. Lower Lid and Midface: Multispecialty Approach. Clinics in Plastic Surgery 42(1). Elsevier, 2014. ISBN 978-0-323-34182-0.
- Azizzadeh B, ed. Rhinoplasty: A Multispecialty Approach. Clinics in Plastic Surgery 43(1). Elsevier, 2015. ISBN 0323414648.
- Azizzadeh B, Murphy MR, Johnson CM, Massry GG, Fitzgerald R, eds. Master Techniques in Facial Rejuvenation, 2nd ed. Elsevier, 2018. ISBN 9780323358767.
- Larian B, Azizzadeh B, eds. Comprehensive Management of Parotid Disorders. Otolaryngologic Clinics of North America 49(2). Elsevier, 2016.
- Azizzadeh B, Nduka C, eds. Management of Post-Facial Paralysis Synkinesis. Elsevier, 2021. ISBN 978-0-323-67331-0.
- Azizzadeh B, ed. Master Techniques in Rhinoplasty. Elsevier. ISBN 978-0-323-82436-1.
- Azizzadeh B, ed. Comprehensive Periorbital and Midface Rejuvenation. Facial Plastic Surgery Clinics of North America. Elsevier. ISBN 978-0-443-31746-0.

=== Selected journal articles ===
- Azizzadeh B, Buga GM, Berke GS, Larian B, Ignarro LJ, Blackwell KE (2003). "Inhibitors of nitric oxide promote microvascular thrombosis". Arch Facial Plast Surg. 5 (1): 31–35. doi:10.1001/archfaci.5.1.31. PMID 12533135.
- Griffin G, Azizzadeh B, Massry GG (2014). "New insights into physical findings associated with postblepharoplasty lower eyelid retraction". Aesthetic Surgery Journal. 34 (7): 995–1004. doi:10.1177/1090820X14544306. PMID 25168805.
- Yoo DB, Azizzadeh B, Massry GG (2015). "Injectable 5-FU with or Without Added Steroid in Periorbital Skin Grafting". Ophthalmic Plastic & Reconstructive Surgery. 31 (2): 122–126. doi:10.1097/IOP.0000000000000214. PMID 25025385.
- Yoo DB, Peng GL, Azizzadeh B, Nassif PS (2015). "Microbiology and Antibiotic Prophylaxis in Rhinoplasty". JAMA Facial Plastic Surgery. 17 (1): 23–27. doi:10.1001/jamafacial.2014.1021. PMID 25503811.
- Kadakia S, Helman SN, Schwedhelm T, Saman M, Azizzadeh B (2015). "Examining the genetics of congenital facial paralysis: a closer look at Moebius syndrome". Oral and Maxillofacial Surgery. 19 (2): 109–116. doi:10.1007/s10006-015-0485-6. PMID 25663568.
- Kadakia S, Saman M, Smith M, Azizzadeh B (2015). "The Gracilis Free Flap in Head and Neck Reconstruction: A Historical Overview of Uses Outside of Facial Reanimation". Journal of Craniofacial Surgery. 26 (5): 1724–1726. doi:10.1097/SCS.0000000000001794. PMID 26167991.
- Braz A, Humphrey S, Weinkle S, et al. (2015). "Lower Face: Clinical Anatomy and Regional Approaches with Injectable Fillers". Plast Reconstr Surg. 136 (5 Suppl): 235S–257S. doi:10.1097/PRS.0000000000001836. PMID 26441104.
- Durand PD, Couto RA, Isakov R, Yoo DB, Azizzadeh B, Guyuron B, Zins JE (2016). "Botulinum Toxin and Muscle Atrophy: A Wanted or Unwanted Effect". Aesthetic Surgery Journal. 36 (4): 482–487. doi:10.1093/asj/sjv208. PMID 26780946.
- Larian B, Azizzadeh B (2016). "Comprehensive Management of Parotid Disorders". Otolaryngol Clin North Am. 49 (2): xv–xvi. doi:10.1016/j.otc.2016.01.001. PMID 27040590.
- Sinha KR, Rootman DB, Azizzadeh B, Goldberg RA (2016). "Association of Eyelid Position and Facial Nerve Palsy With Unresolved Weakness". JAMA Facial Plastic Surgery. 18 (5): 379–384. doi:10.1001/jamafacial.2016.0533. PMID 27311069.
- Banks CA, Jowett N, Azizzadeh B, et al. (2017). "Worldwide Testing of the eFACE Facial Nerve Clinician-Graded Scale". Plast Reconstr Surg. 139 (2): 491e–498e. doi:10.1097/PRS.0000000000002954. PMID 28121888.
- Kossler AL, Peng GL, Yoo DB, Azizzadeh B, Massry GG (2018). "Current Trends in Upper and Lower Eyelid Blepharoplasty Among American Society of Ophthalmic Plastic and Reconstructive Surgery Members". Ophthalmic Plast Reconstr Surg. 34 (1): 37–42. doi:10.1097/IOP.0000000000000849. PMID 28151825.
- Azizzadeh B, Irvine LE, Diels J, et al. (2019). "Modified Selective Neurectomy for the Treatment of Post–Facial Paralysis Synkinesis". Plast Reconstr Surg. 143 (5): 1483–1496. doi:10.1097/PRS.0000000000005590. PMID 30807497.
- Ziai K, Azizzadeh B (2023). "Revision Rhytidectomy: Pearls and Pitfalls". Facial Plastic Surgery. doi:10.1055/a-2190-8558. PMID 37827505.
- Azizzadeh B, Lu RJ (2024). "Facial Nerve Considerations for the Deep Plane Facelift and Neck Lift". Facial Plastic Surgery. 40 (6): 687–693. doi:10.1055/s-0043-1777801. PMID 38198817.
- VandeWater T, Azizzadeh B (2026). "Extended Deep Plane Facelift and Structural Neck Contouring: Technical Considerations for Comprehensive Surgical Facial Rejuvenation". Facial Plastic Surgery Clinics of North America. 34 (1): 1–16. doi:10.1016/j.fsc.2025.08.007.
- Azizzadeh B, Deot N (2026). "The Multilevel Facial Anatomic Classification System: A Comprehensive Framework for Contemporary Facelift and Neck Rejuvenation Surgery". Facial Plastic Surgery & Aesthetic Medicine. Published online 31 July 2026. doi:10.1177/26893614261453792.

=== Book chapters ===
- Griffin G, Azizzadeh B. "Rhytidectomy". In Facial Surgery: Plastic and Reconstructive. CRC Press, 2014. pp. 857–881.
- Azizzadeh B, Lee KJ. "Lower Facial Reanimation". In Slattery WH, Azizzadeh B, eds. The Facial Nerve. Thieme, 2014.
- Azizzadeh B, Kulbersh JS, O'Connell BP. "Examination of the Facial Nerve". In Slattery WH, Azizzadeh B, eds. The Facial Nerve. Thieme, 2014.
- Griffin GR, Azizzadeh B. "Masseteric-Facial Anastomosis for Dynamic Lower Eyelid Reanimation in Facial Paralysis". In Pearls and Pitfalls in Cosmetic Oculoplastic Surgery. Springer, 2015. pp. 621–624.
- Undavia S, Azizzadeh B. "Rhytidectomy in Dark-Skinned Patients". In Ethnic Considerations in Facial Plastic Surgery. 2015.
