= List of 1993 films based on actual events =

This is a list of films and miniseries released in 1993 that are based on actual events. All films on this list are from American production unless indicated otherwise.

== 1993 ==
- A Bronx Tale (1993) – coming-of-age crime drama film largely based on Chazz Palminteri's childhood
- A Child Too Many (1993) – Canadian drama television film exploring the story of a family impacted by an ethical dilemma when they agree to get involved in surrogacy with a wealthy older couple, allegedly based on true events
- A Home of Our Own (1993) – comedy drama film based on the story on Patrick Sheane Duncan's childhood experiences as one of twelve children growing up in the Midwest with a single mother
- A Matter of Justice (1993) – thriller drama television film based on a true story about the mother of a murder victim seeking to bring her son's widow to justice and gain custody of her granddaughter
- A Place to Be Loved (1993) – biographical drama television film about Gregory Kingsley, a boy who is abused by his father and placed with social services
- A Year in Provence (1993) – biographical comedy drama miniseries based on the 1989 best-selling memoir by Peter Mayle about his first year in Provence, and the local events and customs
- Abraham (1993) – Christian drama television film based on the life of the Biblical patriarch Abraham
- Alex Haley's Queen (1993) – biographical romantic drama miniseries based on the life of Queen Jackson Haley, showing the problems which biracial slaves and former slaves faced in the United States during the 19th and 20th centuries
- Alive (1993) – biographical survival drama film detailing a Uruguayan rugby team's crash aboard Uruguayan Air Force Flight 571 into the Andes mountains on 13 October 1972
- The Amy Fisher Story (1993) – crime drama television film dramatizing the events surrounding Amy Fisher's teenage affair with Joey Buttafuoco and her conviction for aggravated assault for shooting Buttafuoco's wife
- And the Band Played On (1993) – historical drama television film depicting the story of the discovery of the AIDS epidemic, and the political infighting of the scientific community hampering the early fight with it
- The Ballad of Little Jo (1993) – Western drama film inspired by the real-life story of Josephine Monaghan, a young woman who lived as a man in the late 19th century
- Barbarians at the Gate (1993) – biographical comedy drama television film about the leveraged buyout of RJR Nabisco
- Belle van Zuylen – Madame de Charrière (1993) – Dutch historical drama film about Isabelle de Charrière and her friendship with Benjamin Constant
- Benito (Italian: Il Giovane Mussolini) (1993) – Italian biographical drama miniseries regarding the story of Benito Mussolini's early rise to power in the Socialist International and his relationship with Angelica Balabanoff
- Beyond the Law (1993) – crime drama film telling the story of Dan Saxon, an undercover cop who infiltrates a group of criminal outlaw bikers behind a drug-smuggling and arms-dealing operation, based on a true story
- Black Widow Murders: The Blanche Taylor Moore Story (1993) – crime drama television film based on the true story of a North Carolina woman (Blanche Taylor Moore) who murdered her first husband and a lover with arsenic
- Blood in Blood Out (1993) – epic crime drama film based on the true life experiences of poet Jimmy Santiago Baca, focusing on step-brothers Paco and Cruz, and their bi-racial cousin Miklo
- Bloom in the Moonlight (Japanese: わが愛の譜 滝廉太郎物語) (1993) – Japanese biographical drama film about the life of pianist Rentarō Taki
- Blue (1993) – British biographical drama film about Derek Jarman
- The Blue Exile (Turkish: Mavi Sürgün) (1993) – Turkish biographical drama film inspired by the autobiographical memoir, also titled Mavi Sürgün, of Cevat Şakir Kabaağaçlı, who wrote under the pen name Halikarnas Balıkçısı – the Fisherman of Halicarnassus
- Bread and Roses (1993) – New Zealander biographical drama film showing significant episodes in the political life of socialist and feminist Sonja Davies
- Cannibal! The Musical (1993) – black comedy musical film depicting a heavily fabricated version on the true story of Alferd Packer and the sordid details of the trip from Utah to Colorado that left his five fellow travellers dead and partially eaten
- Casualties of Love: The "Long Island Lolita" Story (1993) – crime drama television film based on the story of Amy Fisher and Joey Buttafuoco
- Charlemagne (French: Charlemagne, le prince à cheval) (1993) – French action biographical miniseries about the life of Charlemagne, covering the period from the death of Charlemagne's father Pepin the Short in AD 768 to his coronation as the first Holy Roman Emperor on Christmas Day, AD 800
- Cool Runnings (1993) – sport comedy film loosely based on the debut of the Jamaican national bobsleigh team at the 1988 Winter Olympics
- Countess Dora (Croatian: Kontesa Dora) (1993) – Croatian biographical drama film about Croatian composer Dora Pejačević
- Crime Story (Cantonese: 重案組) (1993) – Hong Kong action crime thriller film based on actual events surrounding the 1990 kidnapping of Chinese businessman Teddy Wang
- The Crush (1993) – romantic crime drama film based on events from, writer and director, Alan Shapiro's real life
- Dead Before Dawn (1993) – thriller drama television film based on a true event involving the publicized mid-1980s bitter divorce of Linda and Robert Edelman
- Deadly Relations (1993) – crime drama television film about Leonard Fagot, a New Orleans attorney whose obsession with controlling his daughters led to him murdering their husbands for hefty insurance pay outs
- Dear Diary (Italian: Caro diario) (1993) – Italian-French biographical comedy drama film based on three incidents in, or three aspects of, Nanni Moretti's life
- Desperate Rescue: The Cathy Mahone Story (1993) – action drama television film based on a true story of a woman who tries to rescue her 7-year-old daughter from the Middle East after she is abducted by her Jordanian father
- Diana: Her True Story (1993) – biographical drama television film based on the life of Diana, Princess of Wales
- Dragon: The Bruce Lee Story (1993) – biographical drama film following the life of actor and martial artist Bruce Lee, from his relocation to the United States from Hong Kong to his career as a martial arts teacher, and then as a television and film actor
- The Ernest Green Story (1993) – biographical drama television film following the true story of Ernest Green and eight other African-American high-school students (dubbed the "Little Rock Nine") as they embark on their historic journey to integrate Little Rock Central High School in Little Rock, Arkansas, in 1957
- The Escort (Italian: La scorta) (1993) – Italian crime drama film based on the true story of a magistrate who became isolated and threatened after he sniffed out mob infiltration of a local city government
- Fatal Deception: Mrs. Lee Harvey Oswald (1993) – biographical drama television film telling the story of Marina Oswald, the widow of Kennedy's assassin Lee Harvey Oswald
- Fire in the Sky (1993) – biographical science fiction mystery film based on the alleged alien abduction of Travis Walton in 1975
- Fong Sai-yuk (Cantonese: 方世玉) (1993) – Hong Kong action comedy film about the life of semi-fictional Chinese martial artist and folk hero from Zhaoqing City, Guangdong Province of the Qing dynasty
- Gatica, the Monkey (Spanish: Gatica, el Mono) (1993) – Argentine biographical drama film about Argentine boxer José María Gatica
- Geronimo (1993) – Western historical drama television film depicting a fictionalized account of the Apache leader Geronimo
- Geronimo: An American Legend (1993) – Western historical drama film depicting a fictionalized account of the Apache Wars and how First Lieutenant Charles B. Gatewood convinced Apache leader Geronimo to surrender in 1886
- Gettysburg (1993) – epic war drama film about the Battle of Gettysburg in the American Civil War
- Giovanni Falcone (1993) – Italian biographical drama film based on real life events of the prosecuting magistrate Giovanni Falcone who was killed by mafia in 1992
- The Gray Wolves (Russian: Серые волки) (1993) – Russian political drama film centring on the displacement of Nikita Khrushchev, against which the story of a man who tried to uncover a plot against him is told
- Gross Misconduct (1993) – Australian thriller drama film inspired by a 1955 scandal in Hobart, where university professor Sydney Orr had been sacked from his job on grounds of gross misconduct
- Gypsy (1993) – biographical musical drama television film about the life of Gypsy Rose Lee
- Heaven & Earth (1993) – biographical war drama film about Le Ly Hayslip's experiences during and after the Vietnam War
- I Can Make You Love Me (1993) – psychological thriller television film based on the real-life story of American mass murderer Richard Farley, a former employee of ESL Incorporated whose romantic obsession and subsequent stalking of co-worker Laura Black culminated in the mass murder of several co-workers at ESL's headquarters in California, resulting in the first anti-stalking laws to be enacted in the United States
- In the Line of Duty: Ambush in Waco (1993) – action drama television film portraying the events leading up to and at the start of the Waco siege
- In the Name of the Father (1993) – biographical crime drama film based on the true story of the Guildford Four, four people falsely convicted of the 1974 Guildford pub bombings that killed four off-duty British soldiers and a civilian
- JFK: Reckless Youth (1993) – biographical drama miniseries portraying the early life of American president John F. Kennedy
- Johnny 100 Pesos (Spanish: Johnny cien pesos) (1993) – Chilean crime drama film based on the first ever hostage taking robbery in Chile by Juan García, a 17-year-old thief
- Jonah Who Lived in the Whale (Italian: Jona che visse nella balena) (1993) – Italian-French drama film based on the autobiographical novel by the writer Jona Oberski entitled Childhood (Dutch: Kinderjaren), focusing on the drama of the Holocaust
- Judgment Day: The John List Story (1993) – crime drama television film depicting a fictionalized version of the crime of John List, who killed his mother, wife, and three children in 1971, before assuming a new identity, and eluding capture for over 17 years
- Just a Matter of Duty (German: Die Denunziantin) (1993) – German war drama film about a German war crimes trial following World War II
- The Last Lieutenant (Norwegian: Secondløitnanten) (1993) – Norwegian war film loosely based on the actions of 2nd Lt. Thor O. Hannevig, Norwegian Army (Reserve)
- Lost in the Wild (1993) – adventure drama television film based on a true story about a life-saving mission that turned into a life-threatening ordeal when a plane carrying a group of doctors and nurses crashes in the jungles of Mexico
- Lost in Transit (French: Tombés du ciel) (1993) – French comedy drama film about a man who loses his passport and spends a couple of days at a Paris airport – inspired by the predicament of Mehran Karimi Nasseri
- Louis, the Child King (French: Louis, enfant roi) (1993) – French historical drama film about the formative years of the young king Louis XIV, before he became the Sun-king at Versailles
- M. Butterfly (1993) – romantic drama film loosely based on true events which involved French diplomat Bernard Boursicot and Chinese opera singer Shi Pei Pu
- Mancao (1993) – Filipino biographical action film based on the life of former policeman Cezar Mancao and his encounter with Red Scorpion Gang leader Joey de Leon
- Moment of Truth: Stalking Back (1993) – crime drama television film based on the true story of a teen girl who is stalked and harassed by a perverted man ten years older than she is, but despite help from her family, there's little the police can do to get rid of him
- Money for Nothing (1993) – biographical comedy crime film loosely based on the life of Joey Coyle who, in 1981, discovered $1.2 million that had fallen out of an armored van in Philadelphia, Pennsylvania
- Murder in the Heartland (1993) – crime drama miniseries based on the 1957–58 murder spree carried out by 19-year-old Charles Starkweather throughout Nebraska and Wyoming
- My Life and Times with Antonin Artaud (French: En compagnie d'Antonin Artaud) (1993) – French biographical drama film following Jacques Prevel's journal of a two-year friendship with Antonin Artaud until his death in 1948
- Once Upon a Time in China III (Cantonese: 黃飛鴻之三獅王爭霸) (1993) – Hong Kong martial arts film about Chinese martial arts master and folk hero of Cantonese ethnicity, Wong Fei-hung
- Ordeal in the Arctic (1993) – drama television film depicting the events of when a Canadian military flight from Thule Air Base to Edmonton crashed on Ellesmere Island resulting in the death of four of the 18 passengers and crew
- The Positively True Adventures of the Alleged Texas Cheerleader-Murdering Mom (1993) – biographical black comedy television film based on the true story of Wanda Holloway, a woman who tried to put out a hit on one of her daughter's classmates (and the girl's mother) to advance her own daughter's Middle school cheerleading career
- Precious Victims (1993) – crime mystery television film based on the investigation of the death of two baby girls Lorelei and Heather Sims who were claimed to have been snatched from their bassinets by unknown kidnappers
- Pugoy – Hostage: Davao (1993) – Filipino action drama film based on the 1989 Davao hostage crisis
- The Puppetmaster (1993) – Taiwanese biographical drama film about Li Tian-lu, Taiwan's most celebrated puppeteer
- Rail of the Star (Japanese: お星さまのレール) (1993) – Japanese animated biographical drama film based on Chitose Kobayashi's autobiographical novel of the same name, narrating the vicissitudes suffered by the Kobayashi family after the armed conflict of the World War II, focused according to Chitose's vision at the time
- The Rainbow Warrior (1993) – drama television film based on the true story of the Greenpeace ship Rainbow Warrior, which was sunk in Waitematā Harbour in Auckland, New Zealand on 10 July 1985 by French DGSE operatives, when it was preparing for a Pacific voyage to protest against French nuclear testing
- Rudy (1993) – biographical sport drama film depicting the life of Daniel "Rudy" Ruettiger, who harbored dreams of playing football at the University of Notre Dame despite significant obstacles
- Sakay (1993) – Filipino historical drama film portraying the latter part of the life of Filipino patriot and hero Macario Sakay, who was declared an outlaw and a criminal for continuing hostilities against the United States after the "official" end of the Philippine–American War
- Sardar (Hindi: सरदार) (1993) – Indian Hindi-language biographical drama film about Sardar Vallabhbhai Patel, one of India's greatest freedom fighters
- Scattered Dreams (1993) – drama television film based on a true story of a loving couple trying to make a living in 1951 Florida, when they are arrested for a crime they didn't commit
- Schindler's List (1993) – epic historical drama film following Oskar Schindler, a German industrialist who saved more than a thousand mostly Polish–Jewish refugees from the Holocaust by employing them in his factories during World War II
- Searching for Bobby Fischer (1993) – biographical sport drama film based on the life of prodigy chess player Joshua Waitzkin
- The Secret Life: Jeffrey Dahmer (1993) – biographical crime drama film based on the life of notorious serial killer Jeffrey Dahmer, who murdered 17 men and ate many of them before he was caught in 1991
- Shadowlands (1993) – British biographical romantic drama film about the relationship between academic C. S. Lewis and Jewish American poet Joy Davidman, her death from cancer, and how this challenged his Christianity
- Six Degrees of Separation (1993) – comedy drama film inspired by the real-life story of David Hampton, a con man and robber who convinced a number of people in the 1980s that he was the son of actor Sidney Poitier
- Stalingrad (1993) – German war film portraying the Battle of Stalingrad
- Telling Secrets (1993) – mystery crime television film based on the true story of Joy Aylor, who plots the murder of her adulterous husband's mistress
- Thirty Two Short Films About Glenn Gould (1993) – Canadian biographical anthology film about the pianist Glenn Gould
- This Boy's Life (1993) – biographical coming-of-age drama film about the relationship between a rebellious 1950s teenager and his abusive stepfather, based on the memoirs of writer Professor Tobias Wolff
- Tombstone (1993) – Western biographical drama film loosely based on real events that took place in the 1880s in Southeast Arizona, including the Gunfight at the O.K. Corral and the Earp Vendetta Ride
- Triumph Over Disaster: The Hurricane Andrew Story (1993) – disaster drama television film about Hurricane Andrew
- The Trust (1993) – crime drama film depicting the story of William Marsh Rice's mysterious death in 1900 and the people involved with it
- Wild Tango (Spanish: Tango Feroz) (1993) – Argentine biographical musical drama film loosely based in the life of Tanguito, one of the first artists of Argentine rock
- The Visual Bible: Matthew (1993) – Christian drama film portraying the life of Jesus as it is found in the Gospel of Matthew
- What's Love Got to Do with It (1993) – biographical drama film based on the life of American singer-songwriter Tina Turner
- Wide-Eyed and Legless (1993) – British drama television film telling the story of the final years of Deric Longden's marriage to his wife, Diana, who contracted a degenerative illness which left her unable to walk and in almost constant pain and which medical officials were unable to understand at the time, though now believed to be a form of chronic fatigue syndrome or myalgic encephalomyelitis
- Without Warning: Terror in the Towers (1993) - American drama film based on the 1993 World Trade Center Bombing.
- Wittgenstein (1993) – experimental comedy drama film loosely based on the life story, as well as the philosophical thinking of philosopher Ludwig Wittgenstein
- Woman on the Run: The Lawrencia Bembenek Story (1993) – biographical drama television film based on the true story of Laurie Bembenek, an American former police officer, convicted for the 1981 murder of her husband's ex-wife
- Zelda (1993) – biographical drama television film based on the lives of author F. Scott Fitzgerald and his wife Zelda Fitzgerald, artist and fellow author
