= 2 Days in the Valley =

1996 film by John Herzfeld

- Theatrical release poster
- Directed by: John Herzfeld
- Written by: John Herzfeld
- Produced by: Herb Nanas; Jeff Wald
- Starring: Danny Aiello; Greg Cruttwell; Jeff Daniels; Teri Hatcher; Glenne Headly; Peter Horton; Marsha Mason; Paul Mazursky; James Spader; Eric Stoltz; Charlize Theron
- Cinematography: Oliver Wood
- Edited by: Jim Miller; Wayne Wahrman
- Music by: Anthony Marinelli
- Production company: Rysher Entertainment
- Distributed by: MGM/UA Distribution Co. (Note: Distributed under the Metro-Goldwyn-Mayer banner.)
- Release date: September 27, 1996 (United States)
- Running time: 105 minutes
- Country: United States
- Language: English
- Box office: $11 million

2 Days in the Valley is a 1996 American neo noir crime black comedy film written and directed by John Herzfeld. The film stars Danny Aiello, Greg Cruttwell, Jeff Daniels, Teri Hatcher, Glenne Headly, Peter Horton, Marsha Mason, Paul Mazursky, James Spader, Eric Stoltz, and Charlize Theron. Marketed in the UK as Two Days in the Valley.

== Plot ==
Two hitmen, Lee Woods and mafioso Dosmo Pizzo, walk into a bedroom where a sleeping couple, Olympic athlete Becky Foxx and her ex-husband Roy Foxx, are in bed. Lee injects Becky with a tranquilizer and then shoots Roy in the head. Lee and Dosmo then drive to an abandoned area off Mulholland Drive, where Lee shoots Dosmo to set him up as the fall guy. Lee then blows up the car and flees the scene with his girlfriend and accomplice, Helga Svelgen.

Dosmo survives, escaping the car and revealed to have been wearing a bulletproof vest. He takes shelter at the mansion of wealthy art dealer Allan Hopper, where he takes Hopper and his assistant Susan Parish hostage. Dosmo is unaware that Hopper has called his sister Audrey Hopper, a nurse, to come to the house. On her way, Audrey picks up Teddy Peppers, a down-and-out TV director contemplating suicide.

Meanwhile, Becky awakens and discovers Roy's body in bed beside her. She runs from her house and flags down policemen Wes Taylor and Alvin Strayer. Although sympathetic, Wes begins to suspect that Becky knows more than she is saying. After being interviewed by detectives Creighton and Valenzuela, Becky is picked up by Helga and revealed to have hired Lee to kill Roy for $30,000 but was unaware that the hit would be done in her own house. Alvin later returns to his home and becomes frustrated after his window is broken by a golfer. Later that night, after wrapping a birthday present for his son, he reads a letter from his department for his resignation, making him more frustrated.

Meanwhile, Lee goes back to the house to get the money and kills Creighton and Valenzuela in the process. Wes then arrives to see if he can offer any insight on the case. Masquerading as one of the detectives, Lee lures Wes outside, and knocks him out. At Lee's hotel, Becky and Helga get into a fight, in which Helga is shot and wounded. Becky escapes with Helga firing after her. Helga finds her way to Becky's house, where Lee decides to kill Helga instead of taking her to the hospital, concluding that her wound is too severe to be treated, but his gun jams. He turns to retrieve Wes's gun but finds that Helga has escaped and has flagged down a passing car, where two people get out to try and help her. Another car approaches which happens to carry Dosmo and his hostages. Audrey attempts to help Helga but she dies. Wes is caught in the middle of a shootout between Dosmo and Lee and is shot in the leg. Just before Lee can kill Dosmo, Teddy shoots Lee, killing him.

A grateful Wes allows Dosmo to take the $30,000 and escape with Susan. The following day, Teddy shows up at an anniversary party that Audrey is attending. As Susan and Dosmo drive down a highway, Dosmo contemplates using the money to start a pizzeria in Brooklyn.

== Cast ==
- Danny Aiello as Dosmo Pizzo
- Greg Cruttwell as Allan Hopper
- Jeff Daniels as Alvin Strayer
- Teri Hatcher as Becky Foxx
- Glenne Headly as Susan Parish
- Peter Horton as Roy Foxx
- Marsha Mason as Audrey Hopper
- Paul Mazursky as Teddy Peppers
- James Spader as Lee Woods
- Eric Stoltz as Wes Taylor
- Charlize Theron as Helga Svelgen
- Keith Carradine as Detective Creighton
- Louise Fletcher as Evelyn
- Austin Pendleton as Ralph Crupi
- Kathleen Luong as Midori
- Michael Jai White as Buck
- Cress Williams as Golfer
- Lawrence Tierney as Older Man
- Micole Mercurio as Older Woman
- Ada Maris as Detective Carla Valenzuela

== Production ==
The film was written and directed by John Herzfeld with production design by Catherine Hardwicke. It was the first credited film role by Charlize Theron (she had made an earlier uncredited debut in 1995s Children of the Corn III: Urban Harvest) Theron says it was only her third ever audition. Theron claims she accidentally hit Teri Hatcher during the filming of their fight scene. That fight scene was number 17 on Rotten Tomatoes' "The 20 Greatest Fight Scenes Ever."

== Reception ==
The film was given mixed reviews from critics, with a 60% rating on Rotten Tomatoes, based on 57 reviews. The site's critics consensus reads, "A labyrinthine thriller with a host of memorable characters, 2 Days in the Valley is an uneven but intriguing thriller/black comedy." Metacritic, which uses a weighted average, assigned the film a score of 56 out of 100, based on 23 critics, indicating "mixed or average" reviews.

Writing in The New York Times, Stephen Holden wrote the film "lacks the humanity of Short Cuts or the edgy hipness of Pulp Fiction, but it is still a sleek, amusingly nasty screen debut by a filmmaker whose television credits include an Amy Fisher melodrama." Roger Ebert gave the film three stars out of four on his rating scale, saying that it "looks like a crime movie, but crime is the medium, not the message". Teri Hatcher's performance in this film, as well as in Heaven's Prisoners, earned her a nomination for Golden Raspberry Award for Worst Supporting Actress at the 17th Golden Raspberry Awards.

== Music and score ==
Jerry Goldsmith composed an original orchestral score for 2 Days in the Valley that was rejected in post-production. The released film features a rock-oriented score composed by Anthony Marinelli. Goldsmith's score was released in complete form by the soundtrack label Intrada Records in 2012. A track from the soundtrack, "Rolling on the Sea", was taken from Water Lily Acoustic's album, Mumtaz Mahal, featuring Taj Mahal, Chitravina N. Ravikiran and Vishwa Mohan Byatt.

== See also ==
- Tarantinoesque film
