= Bad Girl (Madonna song) =

1993 single by Madonna

Single by Madonna

from the album Erotica
- B-side: "Fever"
- Released: February 2, 1993
- Recorded: 1992
- Studio: Soundworks (New York City)
- Genre: Pop
- Length: 5:23 (album); 4:38 (single)
- Label: Maverick; Sire; Warner Bros.
- Songwriters: Madonna; Shep Pettibone; Anthony Shimkin
- Producers: Madonna; Shep Pettibone

Madonna singles chronology
"Deeper and Deeper" (1992)	"Bad Girl" (1993)	"Fever" (1993)

Music video
- "Bad Girl" on YouTube

"Bad Girl" is a song recorded by American singer and songwriter Madonna for her fifth studio album, Erotica (1992). Maverick, Sire, and Warner Records issued it as the album's third single on February 2, 1993. Madonna and Shep Pettibone wrote the song and they produced it with Anthony Shimkin. The lyrics of "Bad Girl" depict a woman in a toxic relationship who tries to escape from reality by engaging in self-destructive behaviors, including one-night stands, drinking, and chain-smoking. Featuring synthesizers, drum programming, and piano, "Bad Girl" is a pop ballad, on which Madonna sings in a low vocal register.

Music critics evaluated the level of emotion in "Bad Girl" and complimented its introspective lyrics. Others felt that the song exposed the limited range of her vocals. In the United States, it peaked at number thirty-six on the Billboard Hot 100 Singles chart and ended Madonna's streak of twenty-seven consecutive top-twenty singles dating to "Holiday" (1983). A moderate success internationally, "Bad Girl" reached the top three of the charts in Ecuador, Iceland, Italy, and the Netherlands, and peaked in the top ten in Finland and the United Kingdom.

David Fincher directed the music video for "Bad Girl". Madonna depicts a successful businesswoman who engages in one-night stands with men until one of them murders her. Christopher Walken appears as a guardian angel who watches over her. Madonna performed "Bad Girl" during a visit to Saturday Night Live in 1993 and on the Celebration Tour in 2023. It has been included in retrospective lists of her best songs; critics regard it as an underrated entry within her discography.

== Background and recording ==
Sire Records released American singer and songwriter Madonna's fourth studio album, Like a Prayer, in 1989. It spent six weeks atop the US Billboard 200 and sold over 15 million copies worldwide. Critics universally acclaimed Like a Prayer and believed it established Madonna as a credible artist rather than just a pop star, as she had been previously perceived. Madonna founded the entertainment company Maverick in 1992. It included a record label, film production unit, and divisions for music publishing, television, book publishing, and merchandising. The company's first two ventures were Madonna's fifth studio album and a coffee table book, respectively titled Erotica (1992) and Sex (1992).

Madonna recruited Shep Pettibone to remix some of her songs throughout the 1980s, and the two co-wrote and co-produced her 1990 single "Vogue". She then enlisted him to work with her on some songs for Erotica. A year after the release of "Vogue", Madonna began working on demos with Pettibone in New York City. Among the first songs they created for the album were "Erotica", "Deeper and Deeper", "Thief of Hearts", "Rain", "In This Life", and "Bad Girl". According to Pettibone, the latter two tracks were the result of a period in December 1991, during which Madonna's songwriting became more personal and serious. (Note: "In This Life" was inspired by Madonna's gay friends who died to AIDS.) He believed he may have influenced both "Bad Girl" and "In This Life" as he composed them in a minor key.

== Composition ==
=== Music and vocals ===
"Bad Girl" (1993)
Synthesizers characterize the composition of "Bad Girl".

"Bad Girl" is a pop song influenced by R&B and disco music. The album version of the song lasts five minutes and twenty-three seconds and the single version is four minutes and thirty-eight seconds. "Bad Girl" is a ballad set to a slow tempo. Critics have compared the track to Madonna's other compositions, including "Live to Tell" (1986) and "This Used to Be My Playground" (1992). A writer for the Journal and Courier specifically observed that it was Madonna's vocal performance on "Bad Girl" that resembled "Live to Tell". She mostly sings in a low vocal register and occasionally uses falsetto when the melody rises into higher notes.

"Bad Girl" begins with a slow arrangement featuring a swing-style piano and wind chimes. Synthesizers and understated drum programming begin to dominate the track soon after. Parry Gettelman of The Orlando Sentinel wrote that the production evoked the sound of string synthesizers. Madonna and Pettibone produced "Bad Girl" and wrote it with Anthony Shimkin. The song was recorded at the Soundworks Recording Studio in New York City, with Dennis Mitchell and Robin Hancock acting as recording engineers. Pettibone and Shimkin arranged the keyboards to, sequenced, and programmed "Bad Girl"; Joe Moskowitz contributed additional keyboards. Goh Hotoda mixed the song, and then Ted Jensen conducted mastering at Sterling Sound in New Jersey.

=== Lyrics and themes ===
Madonna explained that the lyrics of "Bad Girl" describe a woman in a toxic relationship who attempts to escape from reality. To do so, she engages in self-destructive behaviours such as one-night stands, chain-smoking, and intoxication, singing: "Bad girl drunk by six / Kissing someone else's lips / Smoked too many cigarettes today". However, she is still dissatisfied with these behaviours and declares: "I'm not happy when I act this way". Critics gave different interpretations of the narrator's motivations: Adam Sweeting of The Guardian thought that it was because her boyfriend had cheated on her; Harry Tafoya of Pitchfork believed it was due to her drifting apart from her partner but being reluctant to tell him; and Chuck Campbell of The Knoxville News-Sentinel concluded that it was caused by "bitter loneliness".

Reviewers considered "Bad Girl" melancholic, haunting, and intimate. They variously characterized it as a melodrama and a hymn, and have discussed it in relation to the other tracks on Erotica. Some observed that "Bad Girl" departs from the album's main theme of sexual intercourse and instead explores the consequences of the act. (Note: Attributed to Billboard critics, Scott Kearnan of Boston.com, and J. D. Considine of The Baltimore Sun) Others viewed it as revealing a more genuine and remorseful side of Madonna on the album. (Note: Attributed to Steve Dollar of The Atlanta Journal, J. D. Considine of The Baltimore Sun, Arion Berger of Rolling Stone, and Tom Moon of the Edmonton Journal) According to Newsday's Frank Owen, the song contributed to Erotica's character as one of Madonna's darkest albums despite its dance-oriented sound. Pettibone never thought of "Bad Girl" as an autobiographical composition but one that many could relate to. Shimkin compared it to her other vulnerable songs such as "Papa Don't Preach" (1986) and "Oh Father" (1989).

== Release and artwork ==
Maverick and Sire Records released Erotica on October 19, 1992; "Bad Girl" is its sixth track. The labels promoted the song as the album's third single and issued it on February 2, 1993. Maverick and Sire provided it to American adult contemporary and contemporary hit radio stations that month. The radio edit of "Bad Girl" was distributed to retailers as a 7-inch vinyl, 12-inch vinyl, cassette single, and CD single. In the United States, "Fever" is the B-side on the 7‑inch and cassette, and is included as an additional track on the CD single. (Note: For B-sides and additional tracks in other countries, see § Track listings and formats.) Maverick issued "Bad Girl" as a 3-inch mini CD in Japan on March 10, 1993, with "Fever" once again included as an additional track.

Steven Meisel shot the artwork for the single cover of "Bad Girl". Inspired by Eve Arnold's 1960 portrait of Marilyn Monroe, Meisel's photo depicts an unclothed Madonna caressing her left breast with a cigarette dangling from her mouth. José I. Prieto‐Arranz, writing in The Journal of Popular Culture, called the photo a "clear sign of postcoital satisfaction".

== Critical reception ==
Music critics deemed "Bad Girl" one of the best songs on Erotica. (Note: Attributed to Liz Saylor of the Asheville Citizen-Times, Chuck Arnold of Billboard, Chris Willman of the Los Angeles Times,) The song has been included in retrospective rankings of Madonna's work. On lists of her best songs, it ranked fourth (The Independent), twenty-seventh (Gay Star News), fortieth (Billboard), and forty-second (Rolling Stone). Slant Magazine, Entertainment Weekly and The Guardian placed it at numbers thirty-five, forty-five, and forty-nine on their respective lists of Madonna's best singles. Critics consider "Bad Girl" an underrated entry in her discography (Note: Attributed to Queerty, Chuck Arnold of Billboard, and Michael Slezak of Entertainment Weekly) and a deep cut enjoyed primarily by her fans. (Note: Attributed to Chuck Arnold of Entertainment Weekly, Alexis Petridis of The Guardian, and Caryn Ganz of The New York Times)

The song's lyrics were a topic of commentary. Neil Randall of the Waterloo Region Record found their ambiguity intriguing and argued that it offset what he considered the clichéd and dull lyrics of the preceding tracks "Fever", "Bye Bye Baby", and "Deeper and Deeper". In contrast, Rick de Yampert thought the lyrics were marred by clichés and argued that its depiction of romance evoked the teen drama series Beverly Hills, 90210. Critics assessed the emotional depth of "Bad Girl"; some found its level of vulnerability unexpected for Erotica. (Note: Chuck Campbell of The Knoxville News-Sentinel, Jay Lustig of the Star-Ledger, and Tom Moon of the Edmonton Journal) Considine found the song thematically compatible with the album because it examines the emotional consequences of sexual relationships. Tom Ford of the Toledo Blade viewed its sentiments of love as more teasing. Telegram & Gazette's Craig S. Semon called it histrionic and Edmonton Journal writer Tom Moon found it boring.

Madonna's vocal performance on "Bad Girl" received mixed reviews. Semon and Newsday's Frank Owen agreed that the track showed how limited her vocal range was. For Sweeting and Lynden Barber of The Sydney Morning Herald, it demonstrated Madonna's average singing voice. Conversely, Lafoya judged it to be one of her best vocal performances and believed it captured the "subtle agonies of her character's joyless spiral from guilt and loneliness to heartbreak and resignation". Considine wrote that the tremble in her voice on the line "You'll always be my baby" could "break any listener's heart". In reviews concerning its production, Priya Elan of New Musical Express found "Bad Girl" sonically lacking finesse, and Gettelman felt that its synthesizers overwhelmed the song.

== Chart performance ==
In the United States, "Bad Girl" debuted on the Billboard Hot 100 at number 75, in the issue dated February 20, 1993. As the weeks went by, the song climbed places and finally peaked at number 36 on the week of March 27. "Bad Girl" became Madonna's first single to not reach the top 30 or top 20 of the Hot 100, breaking a streak of 27 consecutive top 20 singles that began with "Holiday" (1983) and ended with "Deeper and Deeper", as well as her lowest-charting song since "Oh Father" (1989). Fred Bronson attributed the single's poor chart performance to the controversy surrounding Madonna with Erotica, the Sex book, and the film Body of Evidence (1993). Similarly, Promis felt that the public was tired of the artist's "bratty bad girl posturing", which was in "full swing" at the time of the single's release. Matthew Rettenmund pointed out that, "record-buyers rejected what was perceived as Madonna's attempt at atonement for her wicked, wicked [Sex] ways". On the Hot 100 component charts Top 40 Radio Monitor and Top Singles Sales, it reached numbers 44 and 36, respectively. "Bad Girl" peaked at number 26 on the Mainstream/Top 40 chart. The "Fever"/"Bad Girl" release reached the first position of Billboard's Maxi-Singles Sales chart, and came in at number 46 on the year-end chart. In Canada, the single peaked at number 20 of RPM's 100 Hit Tracks chart on the week of March 27, 1993.

In the United Kingdom, "Bad Girl" debuted at number 11 on the UK Singles Chart and peaked at number 10 on March 13, 1993; it was present on the chart for a total of seven weeks. According to Music Week magazine, over 74,915 copies of the single have been sold in the UK as of 2008. In other European countries, such as France, Germany, and Belgium, the single saw a weak commercial reception as it failed to crack the top 30. The song fared better in the charts of Switzerland and Ireland, peaking at 25 and 20, respectively. In Australia, "Bad Girl" entered the ARIA Singles Chart at number 40, eventually peaking at 32 and lasting seven weeks on the chart. In countries like Italy, Iceland, and Ecuador, the song reached the top 3 of the charts.

== Music video ==
=== Background and synopsis ===
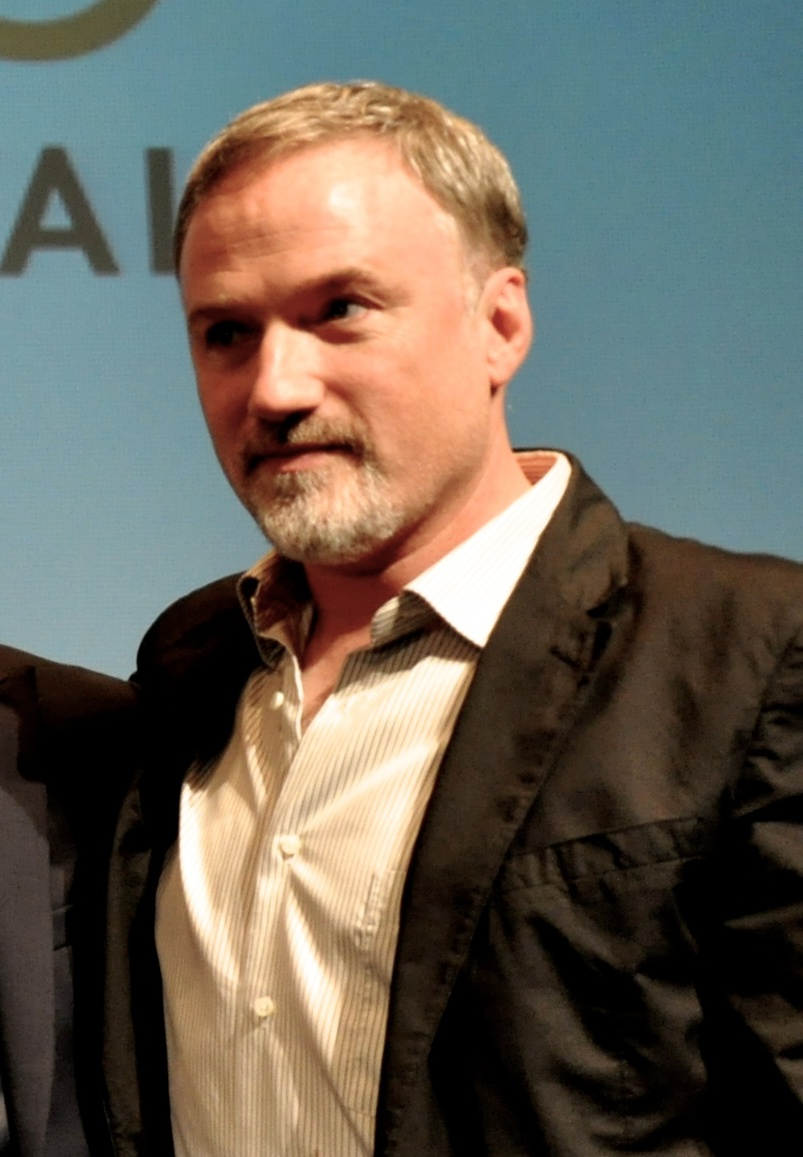
"Bad Girl" marked Madonna's final collaboration with director David Fincher (pictured).

The "Bad Girl" music video was filmed on location in New York in January 1993, under the direction of American film director David Fincher, who had previously worked with Madonna on "Express Yourself" (1989), "Oh Father", and "Vogue" (1990). The singer had previously asked Tim Burton to direct the video, but he turned the offer down; Mark Romanek, who would go on to direct the videos for "Rain" and "Bedtime Story" (1995), was also approached. Personnel working on the clip included Bob Jenkins in editing, Juan Ruiz Anchía in cinematography, and Jeffrey Beecroft as production designer. The plot was inspired by Richard Brooks' Looking for Mr. Goodbar (1977) and Wim Wenders' Wings of Desire (1987). In the video, Madonna plays Louise Oriole, a "promiscuous, chainsmoking Manhattan career woman"; Louise is the singer's middle name, while Oriole likely references Oriole Way, a Los Angeles street in which she lived with her ex-husband Sean Penn. Actor Christopher Walken played the role of the singer's guardian angel. Walken recalled his participation as being "kind of fun." Actors Mark Margolis, Tomas Arana, James Rebhorn, Rob Campbell, and Matt Dillon also appeared on the music video; Dillon plays a police detective, but was uncredited.

The video begins with the police finding Madonna's dead body. Louise Oriole is a successful, chain smoking alcoholic businesswoman, who engages in one-night stands with multiple men. She behaves this way in order to try and deal with the depression and sadness over a failed relationship; all throughout the video, her guardian angel watches over her. In one scene, Louise wakes up alone in her bed after a one-night stand with a bartender and discovers a hand-written note laying on the pillow beside her. She gets upset after reading its content and tosses the note to the ground; her angel picks it up, revealing its content: "Thank you, whoever you are", the paper reads. Towards the end of the video, Louise picks up another stranger. All of a sudden, the song stops, a cat hisses, a can of breath freshener is sprayed, and the angel kisses her on the lips. It is then implied that the man murdered Louise with her stockings; after her death, she reappears as a spirit along with her guardian angel, overseeing the police taking her body away to the morgue. The final shot shows Louise and her angel being lifted away on a director's chair.

=== Reception and analysis ===
Screenshot of the "Bad Girl" music video, depicting Louise Oriole (Madonna) after her guardian angel (Christopher Walken) has given her what Georges-Claude Guilbert considered to be a "kiss of death"

The video was acclaimed by critics. Georges-Claude Guilbert considered it a "masterpiece of the genre". The Odyssey's Rocco Papa named the visual Madonna's "most cinematic", as it "features a plot in a way videos rarely do today". He ranked the video her fifth best. Louis Virtel from The Backlot placed it at number 21 of his ranking of the singer's videos; "beautifully shot, dramatically acted [...] unexpectedly emotional". Parade's Samuel Murrian highlighted the performances: "[Madonna] can be such a brilliant actor, and her performance as a broken, unhappy woman whose self-destructive behavior gets her killed is one of her best." He also noted that the "sad [and] disturbing" clip "lingers in the memory long after you’ve seen it—like all of [Fincher's] best work"; he considered it Madonna's 16th greatest music video. The Independent's Adam White also praised the singer's performance and the directing, writing that, "[Fincher directs] her to express all kinds of contradictory emotions through mere glances or expressions. It is a remarkable performance full of self-loathing, withdrawal and, finally, child-like bliss". "Bad Girl" was considered one of Madonna's most underrated music videos by both VH1's Christopher Rosa and Idolator's Mike Neid; the latter one called it her most "over-the-top". "Bad Girl" came in the ninth position of a poll conducted by Billboard of the singer's 10 greatest videos. For Sal Cinquemani, it's Madonna's 18th greatest music video. White said it was Fincher's "most important venture", noting a "short, stylish erotic thriller" that nods toward the work the filmmaker would go on to do in the future. He furthered compared it to Madonna and Fincher's collaboration in 1989's "Oh Father", as both videos feel like "personal exorcism for [Madonna]" that only Fincher could capture. White concluded by referring to "Bad Girl" as an "unexpected final chapter in the Madonna/Fincher saga [...] something of a twisted funeral for their love story – emotive and affectionate, yet filled with bloody murder". Vulture named "Bad Girl" the 9th best music video directed by Fincher.

"David Fincher’s work with Madonna has been all over his filmmaking, their music video collaborations regularly gesturing towards the movies that would make him internationally famous. [...] But it is 'Bad Girl', full of the psychological depth, visual symbolism and pulpy thrills that would dominate much of Fincher’s filmography, that is his unheralded masterpiece."

— The Independent's Adam White on the music video.

David Denby deemed the music video a "premature summation of Fincher's work in miniature", pointing out references to other works by the director: the police discovering Madonna's corpse referenced Seven (1995); the "backward-running timepiece" image of Walken's angel of death character looking at his watch became the "key visual and metaphysical idea" in The Curious Case of Benjamin Button (2008). Finally, Madonna being murdered by a seeming serial killer was a reference to both Seven and Zodiac (2007). In a similar note, Vice's Raza Syed wrote that the music video "has many of the hallmarks of David Fincher's style of cinematography that would dominate much of his subsequent filmography: air-tight camerawork, brushed-metal visual palette, corporate intrigue, a palpable sense of emotional isolation... and murder". White compared the Louise Oriole character to Amy Elliott Dunne from Gone Girl (2014), as both women share a "troubled antihero quality". According to Mark Browning, the shot of Walken and the singer in an elevated director's chair signifies a "God-like" presence in the actor's character; the author also felt this particular shot was an intentional, tongue-in-cheek reference by Fincher to "the responsibility and pressure that comes with directing". In Experiencing Music Video: Aesthetics and Cultural Context (2004), Carol Vernallis pointed out that, through "iconic imagery", the viewer can predict the fate of Madonna's character: her black dress in a dry cleaner's plastic bag alludes the body bag she will be wrapped in; the cat hissing at her suggest she's already a "ghost or figure who bears a curse"; finally, a door Madonna walks through resembles the "entrance to Hades". The music video can be found on Madonna's 1999 compilation The Video Collection 93:99.

== Live performances and cover versions ==
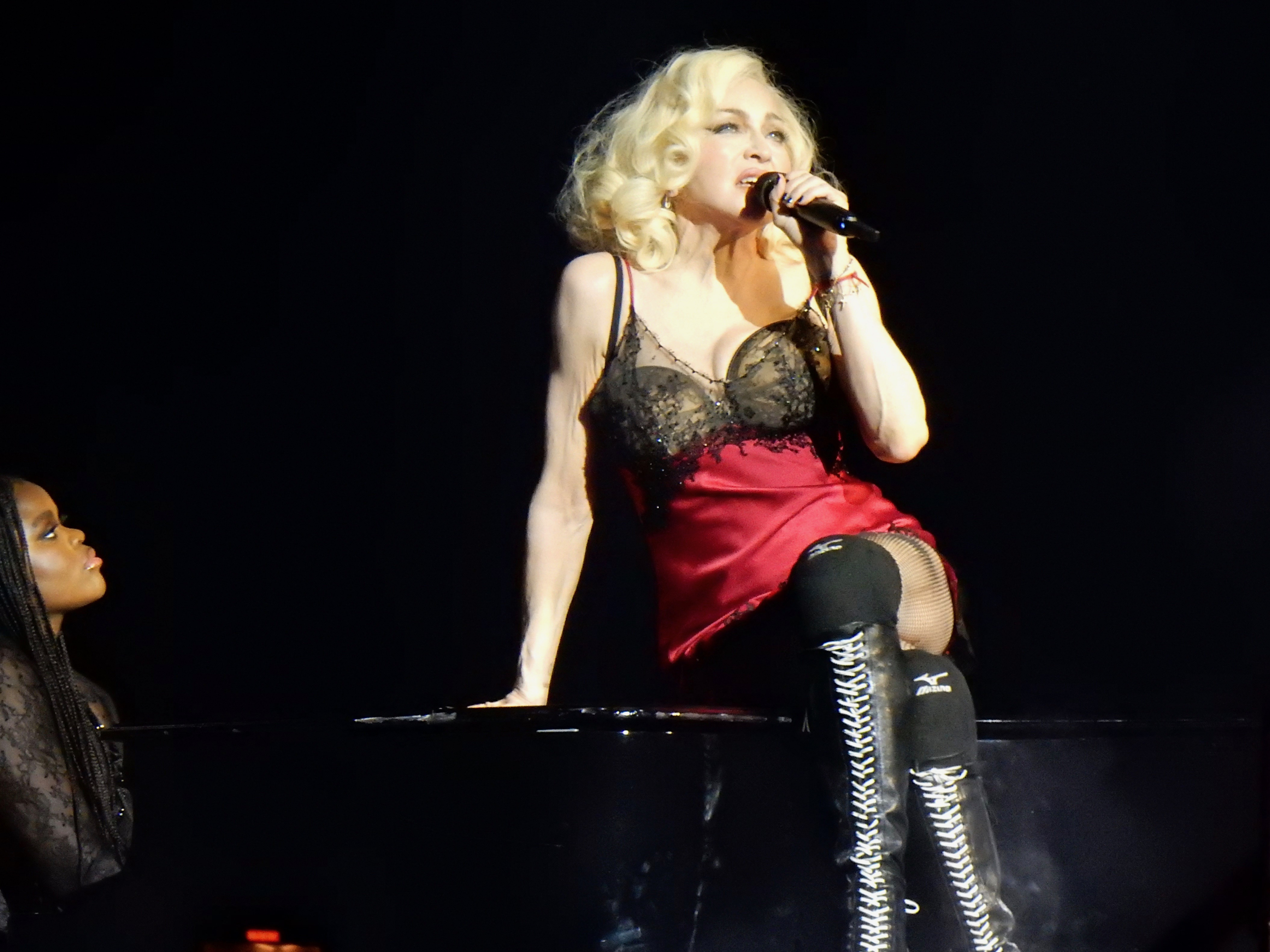
Madonna singing "Bad Girl" during one of the concerts of the Celebration Tour (2023–2024)

The first live performance of "Bad Girl" took place on January 16, 1993, on the late-night live television show Saturday Night Live. After finishing the song, Madonna tore up a photograph of Joey Buttafuoco – the alleged lover of Amy Fisher, the Long Island teenager who shot Buttafuoco's wife Mary Jo – and yelled, "Fight the real enemy!" This echoed Sinéad O'Connor, who ripped apart a photograph of Pope John Paul II and yelled the same thing when she was the show's musical guest in October 1992. HuffPost considered this one of Madonna's "most legendary" performances, and Myers said it had one of her "very best live vocals".

Thirty years later, "Bad Girl" was included on the Celebration Tour. Dressed in a red silk slip dress with black lace, and knee-high boots, Madonna sang as her daughter Mercy James played piano. The number was named one of the best moments of the concert by Billboard's Joe Lynch, who added that, "watching [her daughter] sit down at a grand piano and effortlessly tickle the ivories during 'Bad Girl' [...] was pretty damn impressive. On April 24, 2024, Madonna stated in an interview with W magazine that she saw the performance as a, "strange poetic juxtaposition of hedonism [and] erotic exploration emerging into the light of Mercy, sitting stoically at her grand piano playing Chopin as she beckoned me towards her".

A cover by Boy George, Amanda Ghost, and James Hardway, was included on the tribute albums Virgin Voices: A Tribute to Madonna, Vol. 1 (1999), A Tribute to Madonna: Virgin Voices (2003), Tribute to Madonna: Like a Virgin (2005), and The World's Greatest 80's Tribute to Madonna (2006). A rendition by Semi Moore was included on 2000's Truly Blue: Tribute to Madonna. Covers by Cruzer and Strike a Pose were included Immaculate Deception: A Tribute to the Music of Madonna (2004) and A Tribute To Madonna Vol 1 (2006), respectively.

== Track listings and formats ==
- US 7-inch vinyl, cassette, and CD single; Japanese 3-inch CD single
1. "Bad Girl" (edit) – 4:38
2. "Fever" – 5:00
- US 12-inch maxi-single
1. "Bad Girl" (extended mix) – 6:29
2. "Fever" (extended 12-inch mix) – 6:08
3. "Fever" (Shep's Remedy Dub) – 4:29
4. "Fever" (Murk Boys Miami Mix) – 7:10
5. "Fever" (Murk Boys Deep South Mix) – 6:28
6. "Fever" (Oscar G's Dope Mix) – 4:55
- US and Australian CD maxi-single
1. "Bad Girl" (edit) – 4:38
2. "Fever" (Murk Boys Miami Mix) – 7:10
3. "Fever" (extended 12-inch mix) – 6:08
4. "Bad Girl" (extended mix) – 6:29
5. "Fever" (Murk Boys Deep South Mix) – 6:28
6. "Fever" (Hot Sweat 12-inch mix) – 7:55
- European CD single
1. "Bad Girl" (edit) – 4:38
2. "Deeper and Deeper" (Shep's Deep Bass Dub) – 5:00
3. "Deeper and Deeper" (instrumental) – 5:31
- UK 7-inch vinyl single

A. "Bad Girl" (edit) – 4:38
B. "Erotica" (William Orbit dub) – 4:53

- UK 12-inch vinyl single

A1. "Bad Girl" (LP Version) – 5:23
A2. "Erotica" (William Orbit 12-inch) – 6:07
B1. "Erotica" (William Orbit dub) – 4:53
B2. "Erotica" (Madonna's In My Jeep mix) – 5:46

- Digital single – "Bad Girl" / "Fever" (2022)
1. "Bad Girl" (edit) – 4:35
2. "Bad Girl" (extended mix) – 6:29
3. "Fever" (album edit) – 4:30
4. "Fever" (edit one) – 4:05
5. "Fever" (extended 12-inch mix) – 6:07
6. "Fever" (Hot Sweat 12-inch mix) – 7:58
7. "Fever" (Murk Boys Deep South Mix) – 6:28
8. "Fever" (Murk Boys Miami Mix) – 7:10
9. "Fever" (Murk Boys Miami Dub) – 7:12
10. "Fever" (radio edit/remix) – 5:09
11. "Fever" (Shep's Remedy Dub) – 4:31
12. "Fever" (Oscar G's Dope Mix) – 4:55

== Credits and personnel ==
Credits are adapted from the album's liner notes.

- Madonna – lead vocals, songwriter, producer
- Shep Pettibone – songwriter, producer, sequencing, keyboard, programming
- Joe Moskowitz – keyboards
- P. Dennis Mitchell – recording engineer
- Robin Hancock – recording engineer
- Goh Hotoda – mixing engineer
- Ted Jensen – mastering

== Charts ==
=== Weekly charts ===
Weekly chart performance
Chart (1993)	Peak position
Australia (ARIA)	32
Belgium (Ultratop 50 Flanders)	40
Canada Retail Singles (The Record)	5
Canada Contemporary Hit Radio (The Record)	8
Canada Top Singles (RPM)	20
Ecuador (El Siglo de Torreón)	2
Europe (Eurochart Hot 100)	26
Europe (European Hit Radio)	5
Finland (Suomen virallinen lista)	8
France (SNEP)	44
Germany (GfK)	47
Iceland (Íslenski Listinn Topp 40)	3
Ireland (IRMA)	20
Israel (Israeli Singles Chart)	7
Italy (Musica e dischi)	3
Netherlands (Dutch Top 40 Tipparade)	2
Netherlands (Single Top 100)	34
New Zealand (Recorded Music NZ)	35
Switzerland (Schweizer Hitparade)	25
UK Singles (Official Charts)	10
UK Airplay (Music Week)	4
UK Dance (Music Week)	10
UK (MRIB)	7
US Billboard Hot 100	36
US Dance Singles Sales (Billboard) With "Fever"	1
US Pop Airplay (Billboard)	26
US Cash Box Top 100	27
US Adult Contemporary (Gavin Report)	28
US Top 40 (Gavin Report)	10
US Contemporary Hit Radio (Radio & Records)	18

=== Year-end charts ===
Year-end chart performance for "Bad Girl"
Chart (1993)	Position
Iceland (Íslenski Listinn Topp 40)	46
US Maxi-Singles Sales (Billboard) with "Fever"	46

== Bibliography ==
- Bego, Mark (2000). Madonna: Blonde Ambition. Cooper Square Press. ISBN 978-0-8154-1051-5.
- Browning, Mark (2010). David Fincher: Films that Scar. ABC-Clio. ISBN 978-0-313-37772-3.
- Burgess, Richard James (2013). The Art of Music Production: The Theory and Practice. Oxford University Press. ISBN 978-0-19-992172-0.
- Denby, David (2012). Do the Movies Have a Future?. Simon & Schuster. ISBN 978-1-4165-9947-0.
- Guilbert, Georges-Claude (2002). Madonna as Postmodern Myth. McFarland. ISBN 0-7864-1408-1.
- Metz, Allen; Benson, Carol (1999). The Madonna Companion: Two Decades of Commentary. Music Sales Group. ISBN 978-0-8256-7194-4.
- Rettenmund, Matthew (1995). Encyclopedia Madonnica. St. Martin's Press. ISBN 0-312-11782-5.
- Schnakenberg, Robert (2014). Christopher Walken A to Z: The Man, the Movies, the Legend. Quirk Books. ISBN 978-1-59474-259-0.
- Tropiano, Stephen (2013). Saturday Night Live FAQ: Everything Left to Know About Television's Longest Running Comedy. Rowman & Littlefield. ISBN 978-1-55783-951-0.
- Vernallis, Carol (2004). Experiencing Music Video: Aesthetics and Cultural Context. Columbia University Press. ISBN 978-0-231-11799-9.
