= John Herzfeld =

American film and television director, screenwriter, actor, and producer

- Born: August 22, 1948 (age 78); Newark, New Jersey, U.S.
- Occupations: Director; screenwriter; actor; producer
- Years active: 1972–present
- Spouse: Rebekah Chaney (m. 2010)

John Herzfeld (born August 22, 1948) is an American film and television director, screenwriter, actor and producer. His film, [Don King: Only in America] received two Golden Globe nominations, winning one Golden Globe, and winning Herzfeld, the Director's Guild award, two Emmys, a peabody award and a Critics' Choice Award. Herzfeld's feature credits began with his first feature film that he wrote in 1979,Voices.

== Early life ==
Herzfeld was born on August 22, 1948, in Newark, New Jersey and grew up in West Orange, New Jersey. His father ran a small maintenance company.

== Career ==
=== ABC Afterschool Specials ===
Herzfeld began his directing career with two ABC Afterschool Specials. He won a Daytime Emmy for best directing in children's programming for his work on the 1980 film Stoned, the story of a shy, bullied high school student (played by Scott Baio) who becomes involved with marijuana. He also won the first annual "Scott Newman Drug Abuse Prevention Award" for his writing on Stoned. In addition to writing and directing, Herzfeld also played the part of a concerned teacher in Stoned. His second Afterschool Special, Run, Don't Walk, also starred Scott Baio about two teenager learning to cope with their life in wheelchairs.

=== Two of a Kind ===
In 1983, Herzfeld made his debut as a feature film director in the romantic comedy, Two of a Kind, starring Olivia Newton-John and John Travolta. Travolta plays a failed inventor who robs a bank, and Newton-John is a teller who puts deposit slips in Travolta's bag and keeps the cash for herself. In heaven, a group of angels (including two portrayed by Charles Durning and Scatman Crothers) try to persuade God (voice by Gene Hackman) not to send a new plague to the Earth if these two characters can be reformed.

=== Television movies ===
In the late 1980s and 1990s, Herzfeld directed and wrote several made-for-TV movies, including:

- Daddy (1987): Herzfeld wrote and directed this drama about teen pregnancy starring Dermot Mulrooney, Tess Harper, Patricia Arquette and Danny Aiello.
- A Father's Revenge (1988): Herzfeld directed this thriller about German terrorists kidnapping an airplane crew, starring Brian Dennehy and Ron Silver.
- The Ryan White Story (1989): Herzfeld wrote and directed this biographical drama about 13-year-old hemophiliac and AIDS victim Ryan White starring Lukas Haas, Judith Light and Sarah Jessica Parker.
- The Preppie Murder (1989): Herzfeld wrote and directed this crime drama based on the Central Park murder of Jennifer Levin by Robert Chambers, a heavily publicized murder that became known as the "Preppie Murder" case. William Baldwin starred as Chambers with Lara Flynn Boyle portraying Levin.
- Casualties of Love: The "Long Island Lolita" Story (1993): Herzfeld wrote and directed this dramatization of the Amy Fisher-Joey Buttafuoco story starring Alyssa Milano as Fisher and Jack Scalia as Buttafuoco.
- Remember (1993): Herzfeld wrote and directed this adaptation of the Barbara Taylor Bradford novel starring Donna Mills, Stephen Collins and Ian Richardson.

=== 2 Days in the Valley ===
In 1996, Herzfeld returned to feature films as the director and screenwriter of the crime thriller 2 Days in the Valley with an all-star cast that included Danny Aiello, Jeff Daniels, Teri Hatcher, Charlize Theron, Keith Carradine, Eric Stoltz, Marsha Mason, James Spader, Paul Mazursky and Louise Fletcher. The film was Charlize Theron's feature film debut.

Herzfeld described the movie, which follows ten characters over 48 hours in the San Fernando Valley, as follows: "The movie is about a lot of people who either never achieved their goals, or screwed up their lives, or dropped the football the first time it was thrown to them. What a lot of characters share in common is this unrealized potential".

When the press kit and advance newspaper stories for 2 Days in the Valley depicted Herzfeld as "a first-time feature filmmaker" moving from the small screen to the big screen, the Los Angeles Times published a story focusing on the omission of Herzfeld's earlier work on Two of a Kind.

=== Don King: Only in America ===
In 1997, Herzfeld directed Don King: Only in America, a biographical dramatization of the life of boxing promoter Don King aired by HBO. The film starred Ving Rhames as King and Jeremy Piven in a supporting role as closed-circuit promoter Hank Schwartz. The film received much critical success winning the Emmy Award for Outstanding Made for Television Movie, as well as the Director's Guild of America's DGA Award for Outstanding Directorial Achievement in Dramatic Specials.

=== 15 Minutes ===
Herzfeld also wrote and directed the 2001 feature 15 Minutes pairing Robert De Niro and Edward Burns. Herzfeld wrote at the time that he intended the film as a study of the country's fascination with celebrity—thus the title's reference to Andy Warhol's famous quote about "15 minutes of fame". The film received a mixed review from the Los Angeles Times.

=== Later works ===
From 2004 to 2006, Herzfeld returned to television, writing and directing multiple episodes of the Rob Lowe series, Dr. Vegas.

In 2007, Herzfeld directed the crime thriller The Death and Life of Bobby Z starring Paul Walker and Laurence Fishburne. Walker plays a prisoner offered a deal by the DEA in which he can win his freedom by impersonating a legendary drug dealer as part of a prisoner exchange.

In 2008, he wrote and directed the made-for-television feature SIS, about the Special Investigation Squad, an elite secret police force that hunts down criminals on the streets of Los Angeles.

In 2009, Herzfeld directed the 90-minute documentary Inferno: The Making Of The Expendables for his friend Sylvester Stallone. The two first worked together in 1969 on a low-budget self-produced film called Horses, and later again on Cobra, where Herzfeld played a goon that Stallone's character sets on fire during the film's climax.

In 2014, Herzfeld directed the feature film Reach Me, which included a stellar cast including Sylvester Stallone, Kyra Sedgwick, Thomas Jane, Terry Crews, Danny Aiello, Kelsey Grammar, Lauren Cohan, Omari Hardwick, David O'Hara, Nelly, Cary Elwes, Kevin Connolly, Tom Bergener, Tom Sizemore, Danny Trejo, Rebekah Chaney, Frank Stallone, Scarlet Stallone, Ryan Kwanten and Meadow Williams. The ensemble drama centers on an anonymous motivational book, which gains massive internet attraction, bringing together a diverse group of troubled individuals with interconnected lives.

In 2019, John Herzfeld wrote and directed the feature film Escape Plan: The Extractors starring Sylvester Stallone, Dave Bautista, 50 Cent, Jin Zhang and Daniel Bernhardt. The plot involves a security team who must rescue kidnapped hostages from a formidable Latvian prison known as Devil's Station. The film became a massive hit on streaming services, frequently entering Netflix Top 10 rankings.

In 2026, Herzfeld wrote the feature film Specimen. Herzfeld is set to direct the film in 2027 and is currently in pre-production.

== Filmography ==
=== Film ===
Year	Title	Credited as				Role	Notes
Year	Title	Actor	Director	Producer	Writer	Role	Notes
1974	Death Wish	✓				Train Mugger	Uncredited
1976	Cannonball	✓				Sharpe	
1978	Youngblood	✓				Social Worker	
1983	Two of a Kind		✓		✓		
1986	Cobra	✓				Cho	
1996	2 Days in the Valley		✓		✓		
2001	15 Minutes		✓	✓	✓		
2007	The Death and Life of Bobby Z		✓				
2014	Reach Me	✓	✓	✓	✓		
2019	Escape Plan: The Extractors		✓		✓		

=== Television ===
Year	Title	Credited as				Role	Notes
Year	Title	Actor	Director	Producer	Writer	Role	Notes
1980	A Rumor of War	✓				The Drill Instructor	miniseries
1980	ABC Afterschool Special: "Stoned"	✓	✓		✓	Doug	
1981	ABC Afterschool Special: "Run, Don't Walk"		✓				
1987	Daddy		✓		✓		TV movie
1989	The Preppie Murder		✓		✓		TV movie
1989	The Ryan White Story	✓	✓		✓	Florist	TV movie
1993	Remember	✓	✓		✓	Tom Eddy	TV movie
1993	Casualties of Love: The "Long Island Lolita" Story		✓	✓	✓		TV movie
1997	Don King: Only in America		✓				TV movie
2004	Dr. Vegas				✓		creator
2008	SIS		✓	✓	✓		TV movie
2010	Inferno: The Making of 'The Expendables'		✓		✓		TV movie
