= Celebrity Boxing =

- Genre: Action; Reality Television
- Written by: Barry Adelman
- Directed by: Sandy Grossman
- Presented by: Chris Rose
- Country of origin: United States
- Original language: English
- No. of episodes: 2

Production
- Running time: 60 minutes
- Production company: Dick Clark Productions

Original release
- Network: Fox
- Release: March 13 – May 22, 2002

Celebrity Boxing is a 2002 Fox television show, in which celebrities whose careers and/or notoriety had diminished were pitted against each other in exhibition boxing matches. The contestants wore headgear during the fights, which were scheduled for three rounds apiece. Two episodes of the show were aired.

In 2002, TV Guide ranked it number six on its TV Guide's "50 Worst TV Shows of All Time" list.

== First episode ==
The first episode aired on March 13, 2002. The fights featured were Danny Bonaduce vs. Barry Williams, Todd Bridges vs. Vanilla Ice and Paula Jones vs. Tonya Harding.

- Bonaduce vs. Williams: Bonaduce was introduced by ring announcer Michael Buffer as Danny "Boom Boom" Bonaduce. Williams was billed as "Barry Da Butcher." Bonaduce dominated the bout, knocking Williams down five times before Williams' trainer threw in the towel in round two.
- Bridges vs. Ice: Bridges was introduced as Todd "Mad Dog" Bridges. Ice was introduced as "Bi-Polar". Meanwhile, Ice had Tank Abbott working in his corner. Bridges was in control throughout nearly the entire fight, flooring Ice in rounds one and two. All three judges scored the bout 30-27 in his favor.
- Jones vs. Harding: Tonya Harding was billed as "TNT." Jones was presented as Paula "The Pounder" Jones. Both contestants declined to have their weights disclosed. Jones reportedly took the bout as a late replacement for Amy Fisher, and she appeared reluctant to fight. She frequently turned and ran away from Harding whenever she was hit, and at one point attempted to hide behind the referee. In the final round, she at last announced that she did not wish to continue with the bout. Harding was awarded the victory by technical knockout.

== Second episode ==
The second episode aired on May 22, 2002. Darva Conger took on Olga Korbut in the opening bout. This fight was followed by Dustin Diamond vs. Ron Palillo and Manute Bol vs. William "Refrigerator" Perry. Joey Buttafuoco took on Joanie "Chyna" Laurer in the main event.

Barry Williams also appeared in this episode, singing "The Star-Spangled Banner" before the first bout, and conducting interviews with some of the fighters.

- Conger vs. Korbut: Korbut, who had been charged with shoplifting $19 worth of groceries just four months prior to this match, was rocked by Conger on several occasions, but was never knocked down, and managed to last until the final bell. Conger won via unanimous decision.
- Diamond vs. Palillo: Palillo, who was introduced as "The Pulverizer," attempted to stare Diamond down, and even shoved him after the fighters had been given their pre-fight instructions. Once the bell rang, however, Diamond was in complete control. Palillo was knocked down twice in round two, and the fight was stopped at the time 1:23 in the same round. Palillo finished the bout with a pair of black eyes. Lawrence Leritz was the boxing coach.
- Bol vs. Perry: Bol utilized lateral movement and his 102-inch reach to outbox the nearly-immobile Perry, winning a decision by the scores of 30-27 on all cards. Bol stated in a post-fight interview that he would donate his purse to relief efforts for victims of the Second Sudanese Civil War.
- Buttafuoco vs. Laurer: Laurer was a late substitute for John Wayne Bobbitt, who had been scratched from the bout after being charged with physically abusing his wife. Former lightweight champion Ray Mancini, calling the fight for FOX, expressed the opinion that the decision could conceivably go either way. However, Buttafuoco appeared to dominate the fight, giving Laurer a swollen eye. Despite this, one judge scored the match even, and the other two scored in favor of Buttafuoco with scores of 29-27 and 29-28.

== See also ==
- Celebrity Deathmatch
- Celebrity Wrestling
- Hulk Hogan's Celebrity Championship Wrestling
- List of celebrity boxing matches

== Links ==
- Celebrity Boxing at [IMDb]
- Celebrity Boxing II at [IMDb]
