= Anthony Denison =

American actor (born 1949)

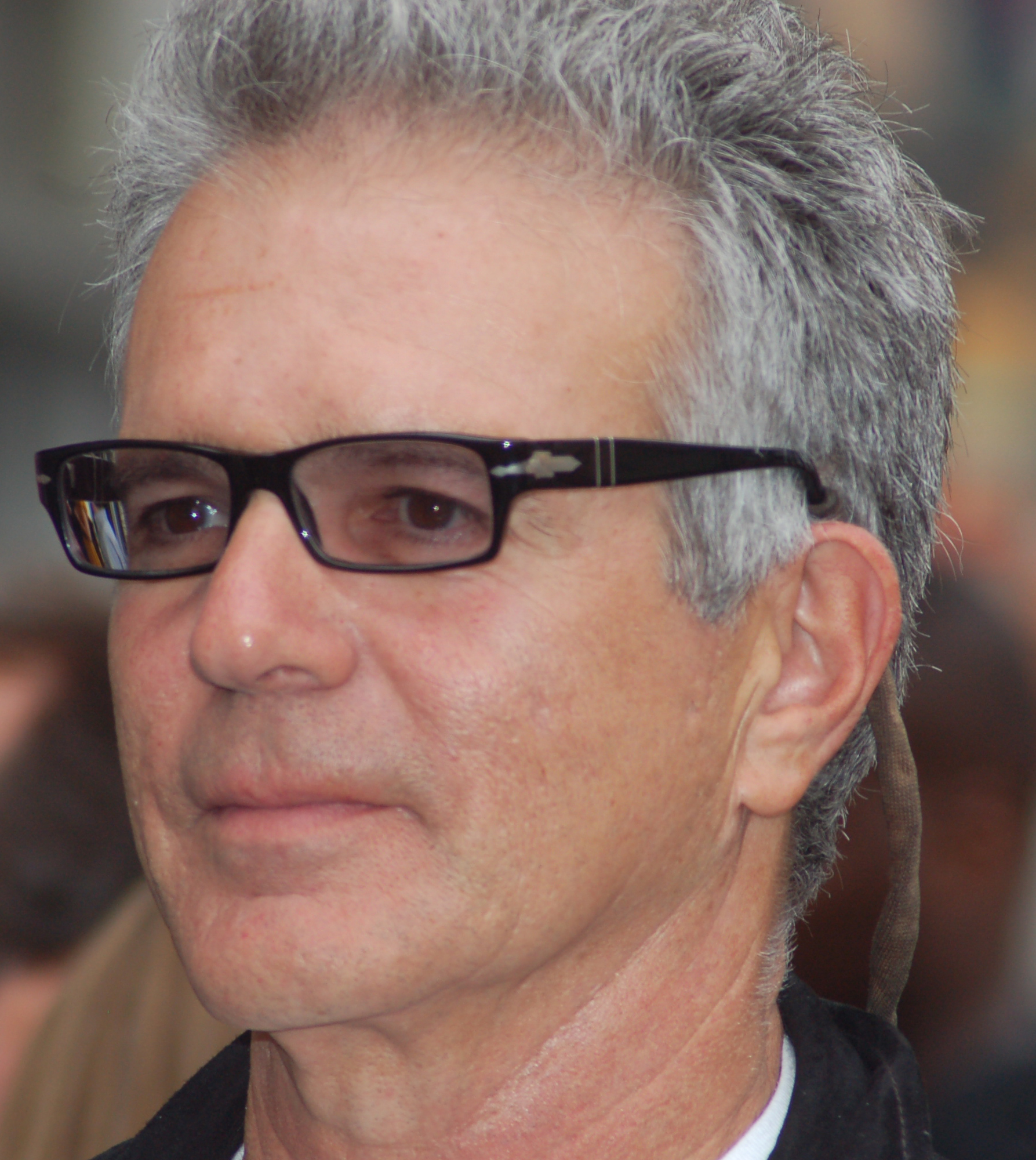
- Denison in June 2009
- Born: Anthony John Sarrero; September 20, 1949 (age 76); New York City, U.S.
- Occupation: Actor
- Years active: 1982–present
- Spouses: Arlene Sorenson; Jennifer Evans (m. 1986; div. 2008) Nachelle Davis (2016-present)

Anthony John Sarrero (born September 20, 1949), also known by his stage name Anthony Denison (also credited as Anthony John Denison and Tony Denison), is an American actor.

== Early life and career ==
The eldest of three, he was born and raised in Harlem.

Denison is most recently known for his role as Lieutenant Andy Flynn in The Closer (2005–2012) and its spin-off Major Crimes (2012–2018). He is well known for his role as mob boss Ray Luca on the NBC crime drama Crime Story (1986–1988). Afterwards, he starred and guest-starred in several crime movies and television programs, notably as undercover agent John Henry Raglin in Wiseguy (1987–90), The Great Escape II: The Untold Story (1988), City of Hope (1991), as Joey Buttafuoco in The Amy Fisher Story (1993), as John Gotti in Getting Gotti (1994), Criminal Passion (1994), and as head coach Mike George in ESPN's drama series Playmakers (2003). He appeared in season one, episode three, of Charmed (1998-2006) as the father of the Halliwell sisters. In 2005, he appeared on Criminal Minds as Sgt. Weigart, a role he reprised in 2020 for one episode. He played Detective Buroughs in Karla (2006). He had a recurring role as Aldo Burrows on the Fox series Prison Break (2005–2009). In 2000, he played the role of a killer for hire in Walker, Texas Ranger (1993–2001). Denison embodied "Government Investor" in the 2011 Frankie Muniz superhero film Pizza Man. Denison played "the General" in the VR movie Agent Emerson.

== Filmography ==
=== Film ===
Year	Title	Role	Notes
1982	Waitress!	Moe	
1986	Just Married	Russell	
1990	Little Vegas	Carmine de Carlo	
1990	City of Hope	Rizzo	
1992	The Harvest	Noel Guzmann	
1994	A Brilliant Disguise	Andy Manola	
1994	Men of War	Jimmy G.	
1994	Criminal Passion	Nathan Leonard	
1996	No One Could Protect Her	Dan Rayner	
1996	For Which He Stands	Vinnie Grosso	
1997	Opposite Corners	Augie Donatello	
1997	The Corporate Ladder	Matt Taylor	
1999	Road Kill	Mr. Z	
2000	The Last Producer	Poker Player	
2000	Skeleton Woman	Victor	
2000	Looking for an Echo	Ray 'Nappy' Napolitano	
2001	Island Prey	Peter Thornton	
2002	Now You Know	Gary Richards	
2003	Art of Revenge	John Ravich	Direct-to-video
2003	Chasing Papi	Agent Quinn	
2004	Wild Things 2	Niles Dunlap	Direct-to-DVD
2005	Choker	Murcer	
2006	Karla	Detective Burroughs	
2007	Dead Write	Dr. Bruno Alexander	
2011	Answers to Nothing	Captain	
2011	Pizza Man	Government Investor	
2012	Trattoria	Sal Sartini	
2014	Atlas Shrugged Part III: Who Is John Galt?	Cuffy Meigs	
2015	Clarity	Malcolm	
2015	Dementia	MC	
2016	Dirty	Commander Rocco	
2018	Frank and Ava	Adler	
2022	Deep Woods	Billy Hadden	
2023	Topannah	Lt. Hayes	

=== Television ===
Year	Title	Role	Notes
1986–1988	Crime Story	Ray Luca	38 episodes
1988	The Great Escape II: The Untold Story	Lt. Mike Corery	Television film
1988–1989	Wiseguy	John Henry Raglin	4 episodes
1989	Full Exposure: The Sex Tapes Scandal	Lt. James Thompson	Television film
1989	I Love You Perfect	Alan	Television film
1990	The Girl Who Came Between Them	Barry Huntoon	Television film
1991	Child of Darkness, Child of Light	Father O'Carroll	Television film
1991	Under Cover	Dylan Del'Amico	Television film
1991	Under Cover	Dylan Del'Amico	13 episodes
1991	Before the Storm		Television film
1992	The Price She Paid	Wells	Television film
1992	Lady Boss	Cooper Turner	Miniseries
1992	The Amy Fisher Story	Joey Buttafuoco	Television film
1993	Sex, Love and Cold Hard Cash	Douglas Colson	Television film
1993	Full Eclipse	Jim Sheldon	Television film
1994	Seaquest 2032	Bobby	Episode: "Greed for a Pirate's Dream"
1994	Getting Gotti	John Gotti	Television film
1996	Love and Marriage	Jack Nardini	5 episodes
1997	Melrose Place	Jim Reilly	10 episodes
1998	Vengeance Unlimited	Sheriff James Broll	Episode: "Eden"
1998	Charmed	Victor Bennett	Episode: "Thank You for Not Morphing"
2000	Walker, Texas Ranger	Michael Westmoreland	2 episodes
2000	Rocket's Red Glare	Marty	Television film
2001	The Lone Gunmen	FBI Undercover Agent Larry Rose	Episode: "The Lying Game"
2001	The Haunted Heart	Bill	Television film
2002–2005	JAG	CAG USS Coral Sea / Commander Stefan Stefanopoulos	3 episodes
2003	The District	Sal Corruzo	Episode: "Where There's Smoke"
2003	She Spies	Arthur Nagin	Episode: "Damsels in De-Stress"
2003	Playmakers	Coach George	11 episodes
2004	NYPD Blue	Tony Grimaldi	Episode: "Chatty Chatty Bang Bang"
2004	The D.A.	Paul Harper	2 episodes
2004	ER	Detective Patrie	Episode: "White Guy, Dark Hair"
2005	CSI: Crime Scene Investigation	Sy Magli	Episode: "King Baby"
2005	Cold Case	Mike 2005	Episode: "Schadenfreude"
2005	The O.C.	Bobby Mills	Episode: "The Return of the Nana"
2005–2012	The Closer	Andy Flynn	Main role; 102 episodes
2005, 2020	Criminal Minds	Police Chief Wayne Weigart	2 episodes
2006	Murder 101	Nelson Raymond	Episode: "Murder 101"
2006	Boston Legal	Kurt Loomis	Episode: "...There's Fire"
2006	Prison Break	Aldo Burrows	5 episodes
2007	Crash and Burn	Francis Garrard	Television film
2011	The Whole Truth		Episode: "Lost in Translation"
2012	Castle	Mickey Dolan	Episode: "After Hours"
2012–2018	Major Crimes	Andy Flynn	Main role; 105 episodes
2014	Sons of Anarchy	Desmond Harnigan	Episode: "Some Strange Eruption"
2019	Murder In-Law	Will	Television film
2019–2023	All Rise	Vic Callan	11 episodes
