= Australasian Academy of Facial Plastic Surgery =

The Australasian Academy of Facial Plastic Surgery (AAFPS) was founded in 1990 and is sometimes referred to as the Australian Academy of Facial Plastic Surgery. It was created under the auspice of the American Academy of Facial Plastic and Reconstructive Surgery (AAFPRS), the world's largest specialty association for facial plastic surgery.

The Australasian Academy of Facial Plastic Surgery is the only association of qualified specialists in Australasia to focus exclusively on reconstructive and cosmetic procedures for the face, head, and neck, including treatments for congenital defects, trauma and neoplasm-related defects, as well as cosmetic procedures. The Academy is a founding member of the International Federation of Facial Plastic Surgery Societies (IFFPSS), which encourages the education of facial plastic surgery worldwide.
