= Little Vegas =

- Directed by: Perry Lang
- Produced by: Peter MacGregor-Scott
- Starring: Anthony Denison; Catherine O'Hara
- Release date: November 16, 1990
- Running time: 91 minutes
- Country: United States
- Language: English

Little Vegas is a 1990 American romantic comedy-drama film directed by Perry Lang and starring Anthony Denison, Catherine O'Hara and Perry Lang.

== Cast ==
- Anthony John Denison as Carmine de Carlo
- Catherine O'Hara as Lexie
- Jerry Stiller as Sam
- Michael Nouri as Frank de Carlo
- Perry Lang as Steve
- Bruce McGill as Harvey
- John Sayles as Mike
- Jay Thomas as Bobby
- Anne Francis as Martha
- P.J. Ochlan as Max de Carlo
- Sam McMurray as Kreimach
- Michael Talbott as Linus
- Ronald G. Joseph as Cecil
- Kamie Harper as Phyllis
- Jessica James as Grace
- Laurie Thompson as Bethanne
- A.J. Pirri as Pancho
- Carmine Zozzora as Geno
- Jennifer Evans as Charity
- Marit Fotland as Cecil's Girl
- Bobcat Goldthwait

== Reception ==
Leonard Maltin awarded the film two stars.
