= Casualties of Love: The "Long Island Lolita" Story =

- VHS cover
- Genre: Crime; Drama; Romance
- Written by: John Herzfeld
- Directed by: John Herzfeld
- Starring: Alyssa Milano; Jack Scalia; Phyllis Lyons; Leo Rossi
- Music by: David Michael Frank
- Country of origin: United States
- Original language: English

Production
- Executive producers: Diane Sokolow; Judith Verno; Rachel Verno
- Producers: John Herzfeld; Vahan Moosekian
- Cinematography: Karl Walter Lindenlaub
- Editors: Neil Mandelberg; Millie Moore
- Running time: 96 minutes
- Production companies: The Sokolow Company; TriStar Television

Original release
- Network: CBS
- Release: January 3, 1993

Casualties of Love: The "Long Island Lolita" Story is a 1993 American television crime drama film based on the story of Amy Fisher and Joey Buttafuoco, written and directed by John Herzfeld. Alyssa Milano and Jack Scalia played the main characters. It aired on CBS on January 3, 1993, the same night and time as ABC's film The Amy Fisher Story, though the latter film was much higher rated in the TV ratings and critically praised.

Phyllis Lyons, Leo Rossi, and Lawrence Tierney portrayed Buttafuoco's relatives.

== Plot ==
Set on Long Island, the film opens with Joey Buttafuoco playing drums, driving under the influence of cocaine, fleeing from the cops and visiting his mother's grave. At home, his wife Mary Jo awaits his return, disappointed in his drug relapse. After she threatens to leave him if he does not quit using drugs, Joey decides to enter rehab. Six weeks later, he is a renewed man, promising his wife he is now again the person she fell in love with. Three years later, in the summer of 1991, he works in an auto repair shop and meets 17-year-old Amy Fisher, who begs Joey to repair her car without telling her parents. Joey agrees, even though he is a close acquaintance of her father, Elliot. Amy frequently crashes her car, prompting her to make multiple visits to Joey. It does not take long before she starts coming on to him, making hints of her promiscuous past, despite her young age. Even though he does not immediately reciprocate, Joey does not push her away and constantly pays her special attention.

One day at the carnival with her friend Lizzy, Amy notices Joey and surprises him with a kiss. Joey is startled and immediately leaves. After he is gone, Amy claims to Lizzy that she had been dating him for a while now. The next day, Joey finds out that Elliot has filed a complaint with the police after Amy has claimed that Joey gave her herpes. Joey sets out for the Fisher residence to set things straight, and Amy eventually admits that she lied about the situation. Joey is outraged, but does not inform his wife, fearing that it will affect their marriage. Later, at a café, Joey assures Amy that he has no interest in leaving his wife and children, and ignores her when she shows to him that she is wearing his car repair shop t-shirt. By now, Amy is madly in love with Joey and thinks that the only thing holding them apart is Mary Jo. She hires a contract killer to kill Mary Jo - paying him $600 and allowing him to sleep with her - though the young man eventually chickens out.

Six months later, Amy shows up at the Buttafuoco residence once again and claims to Mary Jo that Joey is having an affair with her "16-year-old sister", showing him Joey's car repair shop t-shirt to "prove" her claim. When Mary Jo refuses to believe her, Amy takes out her gun and shoots Mary Jo in the head. At the hospital, Joey is informed that his wife's situation is critical and even if she survives, she may be paralyzed for the rest of her life. Amy, meanwhile, seeks out her boyfriend Paul, who is in a relationship with another woman, for comfort. Back in the hospital, a severely injured Mary Jo informs Joey and the detectives that her attacker had his repair shop t-shirt, which makes Joey realize it as Amy who shot Mary Jo. Following her arrest, Amy claims that she and Joey both conspired to kill Mary Jo, in order for them to be together. Joey denies Amy's claims and swears to the cops that he was never involved with her. In the media, Joey is frequently mentioned as an adulterer and conspirator, causing even Mary Jo to question her husband.

Even though he is advised to not speak to the media, Joey decides to make an official statement after the media releases a sex tape of Amy and another older man. It is claimed that Joey forced her into a life of prostitution, and that the older man of the tape was one of her clients. In prison, Amy continues to proclaim her love for Joey through letters to him. During the court case, Amy's bail is set at $2 million, the highest in New York state history, and Joey is tarnished by reporters. He tries to stand by his wife, but Mary Jo is confused by all the "evidence" that's coming up in court, "proving" Joey is guilty. Although she blames him for not being able to protect her, she chooses not to leave him.

By August 1992, Amy's bail is paid by a TV network working to adapt her story. Joey's life falls more apart when he is informed that the entire Buttafuoco family will lose the auto repair shop if it is proven that he had an affair with Amy (the pressure causes his father Caspar to have a heart attack). The Buttafuocos want to allow Amy to have a plea bargain, to prevent her attorney from destroying the family company. Even though Mary Jo objects to the situation, reminding her family that she is the victim here, Amy is allowed a deal in court: She will receive 5 to 15 years for "reckless assault." Pleas of "attempted murder," among others, are dropped, so the D.A. can then go after Joey for statutory rape. Soon after, a videotape is released in which Amy brags about her plea deal, and asks Paul to marry her. The tape allows the Buttafuocos to clear their name, while Amy receives the maximum sentence of 15 years in prison.

== Cast ==
- Jack Scalia as Joseph "Joey" Buttafuoco
- Alyssa Milano as Amy Fisher
- Phyllis Lyons as Mary Jo Buttafuoco
- Leo Rossi as Bobby Buttafuoco
- J.E. Freeman as Det. Marty Algar
- Peter Van Norden as Marvyn Kornberg
- Lawrence Tierney as Caspar Buttafuoco
- Michael Bowen as Paul Makely
- Jack Kehler as Elliot Fisher
- Georgia Emelin as Lizzy
- Erick Avari as Surgeon

== Production ==
By the time the film was first aired, Casualties of Love received a fair share of media attention, due to the film being one of three about Amy Fisher and Joey Buttafuoco by three different TV networks. Filming took place in November and December 1992, and the film was promoted as the TV version that told Joey Buttafuoco's side of the story. USA Network bought the film's rights in 1992, and commented on the production: "This particular movie was very attractive. The topic is just so hot right now." Casualties of Love did not live up to a common television film budget of $2 million. Due to the popularity of its story, the film had a much higher budget.

The film was known for being one of Alyssa Milano's first "adult roles" which shed her "nice girl image" she gained from appearing in Who's the Boss? from 1984 to 1992. The producers cast her after seeing her portrayal as teenage prostitute Kimmy in the independent film Where the Day Takes You (1992). Milano was very enthusiastic when she found out she got the role, saying: "There's nothing grittier than playing Amy Fisher." On her character, Milano commented: "Our version was the one from Joey Buttafuoco's point of view: That she was a lunatic. Since then, we've learned that his version wasn't all true. But it was really challenging to make her believable, because everybody had already seen her on TV and they knew what she looked like and how she moved. I think that movie was the least "Alyssa" of anything I've done." Of all the three Amy Fisher films, Milano was glad that she was picked for Casualties of Love, because it was the one where Amy Fisher was portrayed the most as a "psycho", which allowed her to practice her acting skills.

The film was shot between November 23 and December 16, 1992.
