= American Academy of Facial Plastic and Reconstructive Surgery =

Organization for facial surgeons

The American Academy of Facial Plastic and Reconstructive Surgery (AAFPRS) is a medical society for otolaryngologists (ENT) and plastic surgeons. It exists to promote high quality facial surgery, and runs courses, workshops, scientific presentations, and a training program.

The academy represents more than 2,700 facial surgeons throughout the world. It is a National Medical Specialty Society of the American Medical Association (AMA) and holds an official seat in both the AMA House of Delegates and the American College of Surgeons board of governors. Its members are surgeons whose focus is surgery of the face, head, and neck, and who subscribe to a code of ethics.

All members are board certified by a specialty board recognized by the American Board of Medical Specialties. A majority are certified by the American Board of Otolaryngology, which includes facial surgery. Other physician members are certified in plastic surgery, ophthalmology, and/or dermatology. A growing number of members are board certified by the American Board of Facial Plastic and Reconstructive Surgery.

Dr. Babak Azizzadeh, of Beverly Hills, California, was elected President of the Academy at their Annual Meeting in September 2025 in Los Angeles. He assumed the position the following year.

== See also ==
- Australasian Academy of Facial Plastic Surgery
