= The Amy Fisher Story =

- DVD cover
- Genre: Crime; Drama; Romance; Thriller
- Written by: Janet Brownell
- Directed by: Andy Tennant
- Starring: Drew Barrymore; Anthony John Denison; Harley Jane Kozak; Tom Mason
- Music by: Michael Hoenig
- Country of origin: United States
- Original language: English

Production
- Executive producer: Andrew Adelson
- Producers: Janet Brownell; George W. Perkins
- Production location: Vancouver
- Cinematography: Glen MacPherson
- Editor: Debra Neil-Fisher
- Running time: 96 min
- Production company: ABC Productions (in association with) Andrew Adelson Company

Original release
- Network: ABC
- Release: January 3, 1993

The Amy Fisher Story is a 1993 American television film dramatizing the events surrounding Amy Fisher's abuse as a teen by Joey Buttafuoco and her eventual conviction for aggravated assault for shooting Buttafuoco's wife. The film was produced by ABC and originally aired on that network; in 1993, it was released on VHS and in 2001 on DVD.

The film stars 17-year-old Drew Barrymore, as Amy Fisher. Anthony John Denison portrayed Joey Buttafuoco. It aired the same night and time as another movie on Amy Fisher starring Alyssa Milano for CBS. The ABC film garnered higher TV ratings and critical praise than the CBS version.

== Plot summary ==
Amy Fisher lies in a hospital bed, with her mother nearby. She is recovering from a suicide attempt and contemplating her involvement with Joseph "Joey" Buttafuoco.

Two years earlier, in 1991, Amy's parents bought her a brand new car for her sixteenth birthday but anger her by restricting when she can use it. At her birthday dinner, her father objected to the revealing outfit she wore to the restaurant. After arguing with her parents, Amy spends her birthday at a friend's house.

When Amy's car gets into a collision, her father takes her to Joey Buttafuoco's repair shop. She flirts with Joey and begins crashing her car on purpose as an excuse to see him again. The two begin an affair despite his age being in the mid-thirties. Amy becomes obsessed about her relationship with Joey, even though he's married to his high school sweetheart, Mary Jo Buttafuoco. When Joey refuses to leave Mary Jo, Amy attempts to hire an assassin. Unable to find a willing accomplice, Amy decides to kill Mary Jo herself.

Amy visits the Buttafuoco house and tells Mary Jo that Joey was cheating on her with Amy's younger sister. Mary Jo refused to believe it, even when Amy shows her the T-shirt that Joey gifted her. Mary Jo dismisses the idea, saying Joey gave t-shirts to many customers. When Mary Jo ends the conversation and tries to close the door, Amy shoots Mary Jo in the head.

Mary Jo is left with a partially paralyzed face, but lives. Joey realizes Amy shot his wife and Mary Jo identifies Amy in a police lineup. When reports of the shooting spread through the media, Amy becomes known as the "Long Island Lolita".

In late 1992, Amy is sentenced to prison. Joey is convicted of statutory rape in October 1993 and serves six months in prison.
