= Operation of Hope =

Facial Reconstruction Nonprofit

Operation of Hope is a nonprofit organization established in 1988 that provides facial reconstructive surgeries for individuals with cleft lip and cleft palate conditions.

The organization conducts surgical missions in countries with limited medical resources and offers training programs for local medical professionals. Since its founding, Operation of Hope has performed around 4,800 surgeries in countries including Zimbabwe, the Philippines, and Ecuador.

== Operations ==
Operation of Hope is staffed by volunteers, including medical personnel such as surgeons and anesthesiologists, as well as non-medical volunteers. It collaborates with local hospitals and medical organizations, including JP Clawson Medical Missions. These missions are funded through financial contributions, corporate sponsorships, and in-kind donations.

In 2024, approximately 450 patients had cleft lip and palate surgeries facilitated by Operation of Hope, during a mission at Mpilo Central Hospital in Bulawayo, Zimbabwe. In 2025 a team of 38 doctors came through from the United States and Canada for the 14-day mission in Bulawayo.

== Recognition ==
The organization has been featured in media outlets such as The Oprah Winfrey Show, People Magazine, The Chronicle, and The Orange County Register.
