= Tanfoglio GT27 =

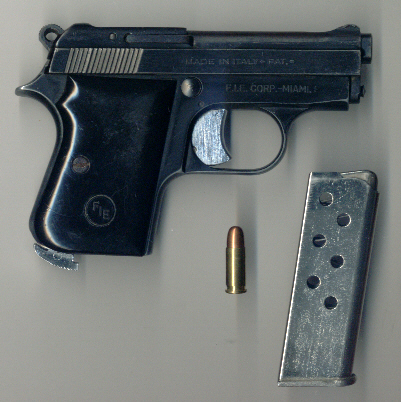
- FIE "Titan" model
- Type: single action handgun
- Place of origin: Italy

Production history
- Manufacturer: Tanfoglio
- Produced: ~1962

Specifications
- Mass: 0.77 lb (0.35 kg)
- Length: 4.72 in (120 mm)
- Barrel length: 2.48 in (63 mm)
- Cartridge: .25 ACP
- Action: Blow-back, single-action
- Feed system: 7 round magazine
- Sights: Fixed blade front, fixed V notch rear

The Tanfoglio GT27 is a .25 ACP caliber, blow-back operated, single-action, 7-round, magazine-fed handgun manufactured in Italy by Tanfoglio. It is similar to the Beretta 950 Jetfire in that it has an open slide.

== Description ==
The "GT" lines of pistols was founded 1962. The pistol was widely exported under a variety of brand labels, including Titan and Targa. Following the Gun Control Act of 1968 in the United States, which limited imports of compact foreign pistols, GT27 parts were imported and assembled, by Excam, Inc. of Hialeah Florida and later F.I.E of Hialeah Florida, onto cheaper Zamak frames cast in the United States, replacing the earlier steel frames.

These hybrid import models were in production until 1990 when all models were discontinued. These hybrid models may be referred to as F.I.E.Titan E27, Excam GT27, Italy Titan, Tanfoglio GT27, GT Targa, Titan Twenty Five or variances thereof. Beyond the Zamak frame, these models are substantially the same firearm as the original all steel Tanfoglio GT27.

The early "GT Targa" branded models featured a large EIG (a cutlery and firearm importing company) proof mark on the frame, Italian proof marks indicating date of manufacture in a roman numerical proofing system on the frame, corresponding proof marks on the slide and frame indicating "Brand of the Banco di Gardone", a TG on the rear beaver tail portion of the frame, indicating the manufacturer logo of d'armi Tanfoglio Giuseppe, along with a proof mark indicating "to be tested with smokeless powder" on the frame.
