= Global Smile Foundation =

Global Smile
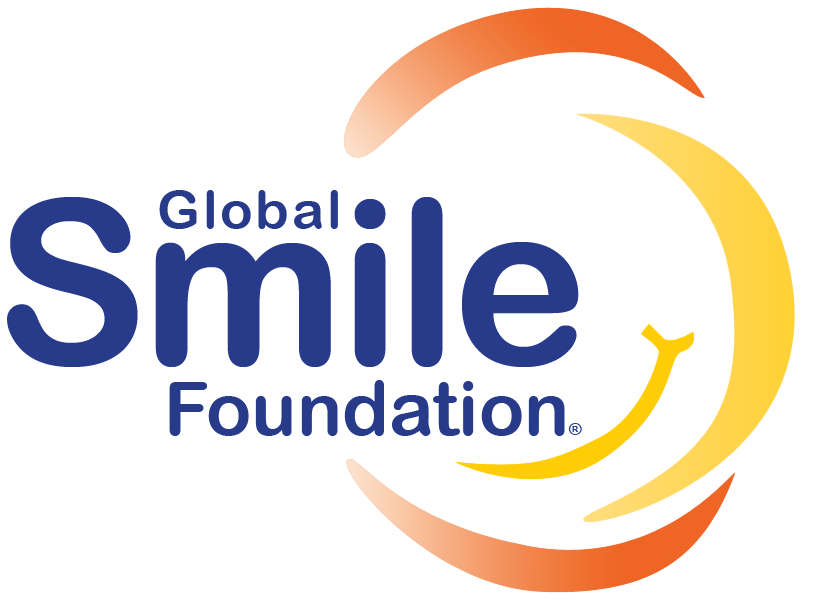
- Founder: Usama Hamdan
- Type: Nonprofit
- Headquarters: Norwood, Massachusetts, U.S.
- Website: gsmile.org

Global Smile Foundation (GSF) is a nonprofit organization based in Norwood, Massachusetts, United States.

== History ==
Global Smile Foundation was founded in 2008 by Usama Hamdan. It gives cleft care, cleft lip and cleft palate, to underserved communities. Hamadan was recognized by the Social Security of Health, Peru in 2022 when they announced that they are establishing a fissured center to treat congenital facial deformities, named after him.

In 2012, the Global Smile Foundation established a cleft center in Guayaquil, Ecuador, and Fundación Global Smile-Ecuador at Leon Becerra Hospital.

By 2014, the Global Smile Foundation was seeing 350 patients with congenital facial deformities and performing surgeries on over two hundred patients during a one-week mission.

In 2015, the Global Smile Foundation surgeons worked with Peruvian surgeons virtually using an augmented reality technology called Proximie to perform a surgery on a cleft lip patient.

Global Smile Foundation is active Ecuador, El Salvador, Lebanon, and Peru. In Peru, they have assisted more than four thousand children recover their smiles with the help of EsSalud. In Lebanon, GSF started its work in 2014 by establishing a specialized association. To further develop their work in Lebanon, they entered in a cooperation agreement with the Union of Relief and Development Association Lebanon in order to treat Syrian refugees’ children with cleft lip and palate.
