= Mary Jo Buttafuoco =

American author (born 1955)

- Born: Mary Jo Connery; May 15, 1955 (age 71); United States
- Occupations: Author; motivational speaker
- Spouses: Joey Buttafuoco (m. 1977; div. 2003); Stu Tendler (m. 2012; died 2018)
- Children: 2

Mary Jo Buttafuoco (/ˈbʌtəfjuːkɔː/; butə-FEW-kaw; née Connery; born May 15, 1955) is an American author and motivational speaker. In 1992, she was shot in the face by Amy Fisher, a 17-year-old girl who was being sexually abused by her husband.

== Early life ==
Buttafuoco met her husband Joey while in high school. After graduation, she worked at a bank near Huntington in Suffolk County, New York. After a five year courtship, they married in 1977 and moved to a house in nearby Baldwin, Nassau County. In 1986, after their two children were born, the family moved to a house in Massapequa; the day before the purchase closed on their new house, she learned that Joey – to cover his outstanding cocaine debts – had signed over the deed on the Baldwin house to his drug dealer.

== Shooting ==
On May 19, 1992, Buttafuoco was shot in the face by 17-year-old Amy Fisher, who at the time was being sexually abused by Buttafuoco's then husband Joey. Fisher had come to the Buttafuocos' house to confront Buttafuoco about Joey, who had been sexually abusing her since July 1991 after Fisher brought her vehicle to Buttafuoco's auto body shop in Baldwin, Nassau County, New York. Buttafuoco was standing at the door having been working to paint chairs in her backyard. Fisher was posing as her own "little sister" Ann Marie, presenting as proof of what she referred to as an affair, a T-shirt that Joey had given her with the logo of his auto body shop on it. This confrontation escalated when Buttafuoco demanded that Fisher leave. She turned to go into the house and intending to call Joey when Fisher shot her in the face with a .25 caliber semiautomatic pistol. Once Buttafuoco regained consciousness, she identified Fisher as her assailant from the T-shirt Fisher had shown her before the shooting. Buttafuoco was left deafened in one ear and her face partially paralyzed.

== Aftermath ==
Fisher was sentenced to 15 years in prison. She served seven years and was granted parole in May 1999. Joey Buttafuoco pleaded guilty to one count of statutory rape and served four months in jail. Buttafuoco and her husband later moved to Southern California. She stayed defensively loyal to her husband for several years, labeled "tenaciously patient" when she defended him after he was arrested for sexual solicitation of an undercover Los Angeles Police Department officer in 1995, implying that the officer had misunderstood, and that her husband was guilty of nothing more than being "a very friendly guy". She eventually filed divorce papers in Ventura County Superior Court on February 3, 2003.

In 2006, Buttafuoco underwent a facial reanimation procedure with facial plastic surgeon Babak Azizzadeh, involving static facial suspension, face lift, and eye lift procedures. These surgeries restored balance and gave her back her ability to smile. Next was surgery to widen the ear canal, which improved her hearing and prevented future infections. She also underwent physical therapy to strengthen her facial muscles, which she explained in an appearance on The Oprah Winfrey Show. Buttafuoco was pleased with the results, stating, "It’s the first time in 25 years that when I smile, I can see the side of my teeth."

== Career ==
In 2009, Health Communications released Buttafuoco's memoir, Getting It Through My Thick Skull: Why I Stayed, What I Learned, and What Millions of People Involved with Sociopaths Need to Know. She was inspired to write the book after her son referred to her ex-husband as a sociopath. Not knowing what the word meant, she looked it up and had a realization which led to her going public with her story. The title of the book comes from a saying her mother often used with her, "When are you going to get it through your thick skull?" The memoir describes her life, not just focusing on her shooting. She describes how she felt manipulated to stay with a person who was a sociopath. Booklist called the memoir, which was published in July 2009, "strangely compelling," and said that "Readers will want to know – why did she stay with him?"

Buttafuoco has used her story to raise awareness of facial paralysis.

== Personal life ==
Buttafuoco has two children: Paul Buttafuoco and Jessica Buttafuoco. In 2012, Buttafuoco married Stu Tendler in Las Vegas. Tendler died from cancer in 2018.
