= Amy Fisher =

American writer and porn star (born 1974)

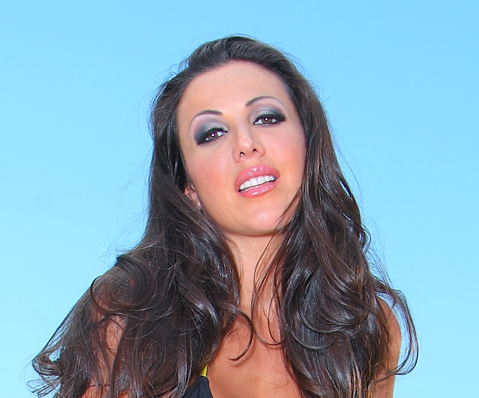
- Fisher in 2010
- Born: Amy Elizabeth Fisher; August 1974 (age 52); Merrick, New York, U.S.
- Occupations: Writer; webcam model; pornographic film actress
- Known for: "Long Island Lolita" incident
- Children: 3

Amy Elizabeth Fisher (born 1974) is an American woman, who, in 1992, at the age of 17, shot and severely wounded Mary Jo Buttafuoco, the wife of Joey Buttafuoco, who had initiated a sexual relationship with the underaged Fisher in 1990. Buttafuoco would later be convicted of statutory rape and serve four months in prison. Fisher pleaded guilty to aggravated assault and served seven years in prison. Her story was featured heavily in the tabloid press and was often sensationalized by the news media, who dubbed her the "Long Island Lolita". Fisher was paroled in 1999 and became a writer, webcam model, and pornographic film actress.

== Early life ==
Fisher was born in August 1974 in Merrick, New York, on Long Island, to Elliot and Roseann Fisher. Her father was Jewish while her mother was raised in an Italian-American family. (Note: In My Story, Fisher says her maternal grandfather "wasn't Italian, he was a mixture of a lot of different things, including English".) As a child, Fisher was sexually abused by a family member and raped at age 13 by a contractor working in the family's home. Fisher met 35-year-old Joey Buttafuoco in December 1990, when her father took his car for repairs to Buttafuoco's auto body shop; Fisher later said she damaged her own car several times as a pretext to see him. They began a sexual relationship the following summer, while Fisher was still underage and a student at John F. Kennedy High School in Bellmore, New York.

== Shooting of Mary Jo Buttafuoco ==
According to Fisher, Buttafuoco often complained about his wife Mary Jo Buttafuoco to her, hinting that he wanted Mary Jo "out of the picture". Fisher ultimately asked Buttafuoco to choose between her and his wife, to which Buttafuoco replied that he chose his wife. Fisher says she told Buttafuoco of her intention to kill Mary Jo, and that he responded by telling her the best way to do it. Fisher obtained a FIE Titan .25-caliber handgun with the assistance of Peter Guagenti, a Brooklyn auto supply salesman who acted as her getaway driver.

On May 19, 1992, Fisher went to the Buttafuoco's house on Long Island. When Mary Jo Buttafuoco answered the door, Fisher said her name was Ann Marie and told Buttafuoco that her husband was having an affair with her "sister", showing her a T-shirt from Buttafuoco's auto body shop as proof. Angered by the accusations, Buttafuoco finally told Fisher to leave and turned back to return to the house. Fisher then pulled out the gun and shot Buttafuoco in the right side of her head, severely wounding but not killing her. Later Fisher said Buttafuoco fell on her. Fisher dropped both the shirt and the gun and ran towards the car, but then returned for them and Guagenti drove off. Neighbors called 911; Buttafuoco was operated on all night, and although they could not remove the bullet, doctors were able to save her life.

When interviewed by police, Joey Buttafuoco told them that Fisher could be the shooter. When Mary Jo regained consciousness the next day, she recognized Fisher from a photo. Fisher was arrested and charged with attempted murder. Her bail was set at US$2 million, which was paid partly as a result of Fisher's family selling the right to publish her life story for US$80,000. In September 1992, after accepting a plea bargain, she pleaded guilty to aggravated assault.

Joey Buttafuoco denied having an affair with Fisher. In October 1992, the Nassau County District Attorney stated that Buttafuoco would not be prosecuted. However, in February 1993, the case against him was reopened due to rape charges made by Fisher. She testified against him in court and based on this testimony and hotel receipts (dated before Fisher's 17th birthday) with Buttafuoco's signature on them, Buttafuoco was charged with statutory rape. After pleading guilty in October 1993, he served four months in prison. Guagenti, who sold Fisher the pistol used to shoot Mary Jo Buttafuoco, and had driven Fisher to and from the shooting, was sentenced to six months in jail.

Fisher was sentenced to up to 15 years in prison at the Albion Correctional Facility in New York, ultimately serving seven years. She was granted parole in May 1999 after Nassau County Court Judge Ira Wexner shortened her maximum sentence to 10 years, which made her immediately eligible for parole. Wexner acted after having found that Fisher had not been appropriately represented by her lawyer at the time of her 1992 guilty plea. She remained on parole until 2003.

== Public profile ==
Fisher's story was often sensationalized by the news media, who dubbed her the "Long Island Lolita". Fisher was interviewed by Oprah Winfrey, and her story was featured heavily in the tabloid press and became the subject of several made-for-TV movies and numerous books and magazine articles.

In September 1992, the tabloid television show Hard Copy broadcast a videotaped conversation between Fisher and Paul Makely, the owner of a gym in Massapequa. In the tape, recorded hours before she agreed to her plea bargain, Fisher could be seen talking about her future, saying that she wanted to marry Makely so he could visit her in prison. Fisher explained that her lawyer believed requiring people to be married for such visits was unconstitutional and that she intended to challenge the law on this matter. Fisher could be seen on the tape saying: "I want my name in the press. Why? Because I can make a lot of money. I figure if I'm going through all this pain and suffering, I'm getting a Ferrari."

According to screenwriter Alan Ball, Fisher's story was an inspiration to him in writing the script for the 1999 film American Beauty.

== Life after prison ==
After her release from prison, Fisher became a columnist for the Long Island Press. Her biography, If I Knew Then..., written by Robbie Woliver, was published in 2004 and became a New York Times bestseller. In 2003, Fisher married. She had three children before divorcing in 2015.

In 2006, Fisher reunited with Mary Jo Buttafuoco in sessions televised for Entertainment Tonight and its spinoff, The Insider. Fisher said she wanted to heal and move on with her life. However, two years later, she said she felt "no sympathy for Mary Jo," without giving an explanation. Fisher and Joey Buttafuoco eventually reunited for the first time at the 2006 Lingerie Bowl for the coin toss.

In June and July 2011 Fisher appeared as a cast member in the fifth season of the reality-television series Celebrity Rehab with Dr. Drew, which aired on VH1.

== Sex tape and adult entertainment career ==
In October 2007, Red Light District Video published a press release stating that it intended to release a sex tape of the couple that Fisher's husband had sold the company. A teaser clip was released under the title Amy Fisher Caught on Tape. Fisher sued Red Light District and its owner, David Joseph, claiming copyright infringement and other damages.

In early January 2008, Fisher announced that she had settled with Red Light and agreed to make a related promotional appearance. The same announcement indicated that she and her husband had reconciled. The promotional appearance took place at Retox in New York City on January 4, 2008. Clips of the video were played on The Howard Stern Show. On March 6, 2008, Fisher was a guest on the Stern show, and one topic of discussion was meant to be her video. After the first phone call, which was from Mary Jo Buttafuoco's daughter, Jessica, Fisher left the show, six minutes into her interview.

On January 12, 2009, Fisher released a pay-per-view adult film, Amy Fisher: Totally Nude & Exposed. She signed a deal with Lee Entertainment to become a stripper doing club shows at least once a month. Fisher said she planned to strip until her fans told her, "Dear, please put your clothes back on. You're too old." In September 2010, DreamZone Entertainment released the adult film Deep inside Amy Fisher, calling it the first of eight such films Fisher would produce and in which she would star. The company had announced the movie in July 2010 under the working title The Making of Amy Fisher: Porn Star. In June 2011, Fisher said she was no longer making adult films.

== Books and films ==
=== As author ===
- With Weller, Sheila (1993). Amy Fisher: My Story. New York: Pocket Books. ISBN 978-0-671-86558-0.
- With Woliver, Robbie (2004). If I Knew Then... New York: iUniverse. ISBN 978-0-595-32445-3.

=== As subject ===
- Eftimiades, Maria (1992). Lethal Lolita: A True Story of Sex, Scandal and Deadly Obsession. St. Martin's Press. ISBN 978-0-312-95062-0.
- Dominguez, Pier (2001). Amy Fisher: Anatomy of a Scandal: The Myth, the Media and the Truth Behind the Long Island Lolita Story. Writers Club Press. ISBN 978-0-595-18417-0.

=== Made-for-TV movies ===
- Amy Fisher: My Story, broadcast on NBC in 1992 with Noelle Parker starring as Fisher.
- Casualties of Love: The "Long Island Lolita" Story, broadcast on CBS in 1993 with Alyssa Milano starring as Fisher.
- The Amy Fisher Story, broadcast on ABC in 1993 with Drew Barrymore starring as Fisher.
- I Am Mary Jo Buttafuoco, broadcast on Lifetime in 2026 with Maddy Hillis starring as Fisher.

== See also ==
- Amanda Knox – American writer and activist (born 1987)
- Claudine Longet – French singer (1942–2026)
- Diane Zamora – American midshipman and murderer (born 1978)
- Karla Faye Tucker – American murderer (1959–1998)
