= Joey Buttafuoco =

American shop owner and rapist (born 1956)

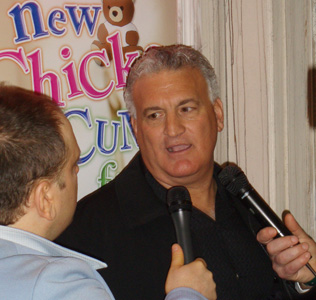
- Joey Buttafuoco
- Born: March 11, 1956 (age 70); Massapequa, New York, U.S.
- Occupation: Auto body shop owner
- Spouses: Mary Jo Buttafuoco (m. 1977; div. 2003) Evanka Franjko (m. 2005)
- Children: 2

Joseph A. Buttafuoco (/ˈbʌtəfjuːkɔː/; butə-FEW-kaw; born March 11, 1956) is an American auto body shop owner. In 1992, Buttafuoco was convicted for his statutory rape of a minor, 17-year-old Amy Fisher, after Fisher shot his wife, Mary Jo Buttafuoco, in the face. Tabloid news coverage, which was extensive and made Fisher and Buttafuoco famous nationwide, labelled Fisher the "Long Island Lolita".

Buttafuoco later pled guilty to one count of statutory rape and served four months in jail.

== Early life ==
Buttafuoco was born on Long Island, New York and raised in Massapequa in Nassau County. He graduated from Massapequa High School in 1974.

== Shooting incident ==
Buttafuoco first met then-15-year-old Amy Fisher when her father took his car to be repaired at his garage in 1990. He began abusing her sexually in July 1991, when Fisher took her vehicle to Buttafuoco's auto body shop in Baldwin, Nassau County, New York. Fisher later said she had damaged the car several times as a pretext to see him.

On May 19, 1992, Fisher confronted Buttafuoco's wife, Mary Jo, at the Buttafuocos' home. When Mary Jo answered the door, Fisher—posing as her own (fictitious) sister Ann Marie—offered, as proof of the affair, a T-shirt that Joey had given her with the logo of his auto body shop on it. The front porch confrontation escalated, and when Mary Jo demanded that Fisher leave and turned to go into the house to call Joey, Fisher shot her in the face with a .25 caliber semiautomatic pistol. Once Mary Jo regained consciousness, she identified Fisher as her assailant.

The subsequent court cases involving a series of conflicting claims received significant news coverage in both mainstream news outlets and tabloids.

Buttafuoco's lawyer maintained that Buttafuoco was never involved with Fisher and Fisher had invented the affair, while Fisher's lawyer portrayed Fisher as a victim whom Buttafuoco manipulated into committing the shooting.

After Fisher's assault conviction, Buttafuoco was indicted on 19 counts of statutory rape, sodomy, and endangering the welfare of a child. He initially pled not guilty. He later changed his plea to guilty, admitting he had sex with Fisher when she was 16 and that he knew her age at the time. He was sentenced to six months' jail time and was released after serving four months and nine days of the sentence.

== Life after the incident ==
After his release from jail, Joey and Mary Jo Buttafuoco moved to California, where Mary Jo filed divorce papers in Ventura County Superior Court on February 3, 2003. In 2005 Buttafuoco married Evanka Franjko.

In July 2009, seventeen years after the incident, Mary Jo published a book titled Getting It Through My Thick Skull: Why I Stayed, What I Learned, and What Millions of People Involved with Sociopaths Need to Know. In the book, she characterizes Buttafuoco as a sociopath, and says that her son helped her come to that conclusion.

=== Other legal issues ===
Buttafuoco has been convicted of crimes since the 1992 shooting incident:

- In 1995, he pleaded no contest to a solicitation-of-prostitution charge and was fined and placed on probation for two years.
- In 2004, he was sentenced to a year in jail and five years of probation after pleading guilty to auto insurance fraud. As part of the sentence, he is prohibited from working in the auto body industry in California for the rest of his life.
- In August 2005, he was charged with illegal possession of ammunition. As a convicted felon, he is legally not permitted to own ammunition. Probation officers found the ammunition during a search of his home. He pleaded no contest and began serving his sentence on January 8, 2007. He was released on April 28, 2007.

=== Media appearances ===
- In 1997, Buttafuoco appeared on Judge Judy with Ruth Webb.
- In 2002, Buttafuoco participated in Celebrity Boxing, originally slated to oppose John Wayne Bobbitt, who dropped out after being arrested for domestic abuse. Bobbitt was replaced by female pro wrestler Joanie "Chyna" Laurer. Buttafuoco, despite being booed, won the fight in a majority decision (29–28, 29–27, 28–28).
- In 2006, he and Fisher were reunited at the Lingerie Bowl for the coin toss.
- On March 5, 2009, Joey Buttafuoco appeared in an episode of Judge Pirro, successfully suing an adult film actress for failure to pay an auto body bill.

== In popular culture ==
The significant coverage of the shooting incident made Buttafuoco a minor celebrity. During Fisher's trial, Buttafuoco appeared frequently on mainstream and tabloid news programs and talk shows and gave multiple interviews to all forms of media. David Letterman, in his last year of hosting Late Night with David Letterman, discussed the incident so often that Buttafuoco's name was a recurring punchline, while Saturday Night Live parodied the case in multiple sketches. The Critic parodied Letterman's obsession with the scandal in the episode "Sherman of Arabia" with the number one reason on his Top 10 Reasons Jay Sherman Is Still a Hostage being "Buttafuoco, Buttafuoco, Buttafuoco!"

Nas references Buttafuoco on the song The Set Up from his sophomore album It Was Written (1996), rapping: "A tight Parasuco with young faces, can turn nigga Buttafuoco of all ages".

During an appearance on Saturday Night Live in January 1993, Madonna performed her single "Bad Girl" from her fifth studio album, Erotica (1992). At the end of the performance, she ripped up an 8-by-10 photograph of Buttafuoco, while yelling to her audience "Fight the real enemy!". This action was a spoof of the actions taken by Sinéad O'Connor when she acted on the program in October 1992, in which she ripped apart a photograph of Pope John Paul II and yelled the phrase as a protest against the dogma of the Roman Catholic Church.

On Season 6 Episode 7 of Law and Order, Buttafuoco is referenced by Detective Curtis in the investigation of the death of a working girl.

On Season 4 Episode 18 of Friends, Buttafuoco is referenced as hurting the cause of people named Joey. He was also referenced in an episode of NewsRadio, where one of the characters is sanctioned for doing a story on Buttafuoco, not because the story was not true, but because he accidentally mispronounced the surname as "butta-fuck-o".
