= The Girlie Show (tour) =

1993 concert tour by Madonna

- World tour by Madonna
- Promotional poster for the tour
- Location: Asia; Europe; North America; Oceania; South America
- Associated album: Erotica
- Start date: September 25, 1993
- End date: December 19, 1993
- Legs: 5
- No. of shows: 39
- Supporting acts: Yonca Evcimik; Kenan Doğulu; U.N.V.; Mario Pelchat; Peter Andre
- Box office: US$70 million (Note: US$156.01 million in 2025 dollars.)

Madonna concert chronology
- Blond Ambition World Tour (1990); The Girlie Show (1993); Drowned World Tour (2001)

The Girlie Show was the fourth concert tour by American singer Madonna, launched in support of her fifth studio album, Erotica (1992). Comprising 39 shows, the tour visited Europe, the Middle East, North America, Latin America, Asia, and Oceania, and ran from September 25, 1993, at Wembley Stadium in London, England, to December 19 at the Tokyo Dome in Tokyo, Japan. It marked Madonna’s first concerts in countries including Turkey, Israel, Mexico, Puerto Rico, Argentina, Brazil, and Australia. The tour was announced in July 1993, following a period of intense media scrutiny surrounding the release of Erotica, the coffee table book Sex, and the film Body of Evidence (1993). Its title was inspired by an Edward Hopper painting, and Madonna's brother, Christopher Ciccone, served as tour director. Costumes were provided by Dolce & Gabbana.

The production was divided into thematic sections—Dominatrix, Studio 54, Weimar Cabaret, and an encore. Madonna opened the show dressed as a dominatrix, accompanied by topless dancers, while other segments incorporated cabaret and disco aesthetics. The performance of "Express Yourself" (1989) featured her descending from the ceiling on a disco ball, and "Like a Virgin" (1984) was staged in the style of actress Marlene Dietrich. The Girlie Show received generally positive reviews from critics, who observed that despite the controversy surrounding Madonna, she could still please audiences. It earned US$70 million ($156.01 million in 2025 dollars) in ticket sales, becoming the highest-grossing female tour of the year.

Despite its commercial success, the tour generated controversy in several countries due to its explicit sexual content. In Puerto Rico, Madonna drew criticism after passing the island's flag between her legs during a performance, while religious groups in other territories protested the show. The November 19, 1993, performance in Sydney, Australia was filmed and broadcast on HBO before being released on home video as The Girlie Show: Live Down Under (1994), while concerts in Fukuoka, Japan were recorded for television broadcast.

== Background ==
In October 1992, Madonna simultaneously released her fifth studio album Erotica and the coffee table book Sex. Photographed by Steven Meisel, Sex featured explicit and sexually provocative imagery and was met with a strong backlash from the media and the public, despite its commercial success. The controversy overshadowed Erotica, which—though generally well reviewed—became Madonna's lowest-selling album at the time. She continued to explore provocative themes in the 1993 erotic thriller Body of Evidence, which was a critical and commercial failure.

The Philadelphia Inquirer reported on July 9, 1993, that Madonna would embark on a new concert tour titled The Girlie Show. Some critics viewed the announcement as an attempt to "revive" her musical career following the negative reception of Body of Evidence. The Girlie Show took its name from Edward Hopper's 1941 painting of a nude dancer dropping her costume behind her. Aware that she no longer commanded the same level of mainstream popularity as in previous years, Madonna deliberately scaled back the production, assembling a more streamlined tour that ultimately played 39 shows across five continents.

Scheduled to open at London's Wembley Stadium on September 25, 1993, the tour deliberately began outside the United States. Madonna said she was "not interested in preaching to the converted" and preferred to start in places where she had "the most enemies". The initial itinerary excluded the US altogether, focusing instead on countries she had never toured or rarely visited, including Turkey, Israel, Mexico, Puerto Rico, Argentina, Brazil, and Australia. Due to strong demand, however, shows were scheduled in select US cities. A performance in Beijing's Workers' Stadium was also planned and tentatively approved by Chinese authorities, provided the show avoided "indecent exposure", but the concert ultimately did not take place.

To coincide with the tour, a promotional extended play (EP) titled The Girlie Show, containing all six singles from Erotica, was released exclusively in Brazil. Similarly, limited editions of Erotica and The Immaculate Collection (1990) were also issued in Australia. The tour was later documented in a photo book of the same name, released in November 1994, which included a CD containing live recordings of "Like a Virgin" (1984), "Why's It So Hard", and "In This Life". Reflecting on her return to touring, Madonna wrote:

"When I finished the Blond Ambition tour, I swore on my life that I would never even think of going on tour again as long as I lived. I was spent. I was exhausted. I was sick of traveling. I wanted stability. So, I threw myself into making movies, recording a new album, and I also put out a book called Sex. So much for stability.

Needless to say, as rewarding as all these creative endeavors were to me, they could not take the place of performing live. Theater is my life--or is my life theater? I'm not sure and it really doesn't matter. Being on stage is where I feel most alive, and it's where I'm able to pull all of my creative energies into one outlet. It's the only place where I can combine all of my influences and all of my inspirations into one living, breathing animal. The stage is the only environment where cubist painting, burlesque, flamenco dancing and the circus can live together under one cozy roof. Taking the adventure one step further is to play in front of a different audience every night. dealing with different cultures, different expectations, different ways of expressing pleasure and bewilderment--this to me is the ultimate thrill. The ultimate risk. And I love taking risks. You may have heard that about me. There's no way this book could truly recapture the excitement of the 'Girlie Show', but it comes pretty damn close.

By the way, if you ever hear me say, "I'm never going on tour again", don't believe me."

== Development ==
=== Conception ===
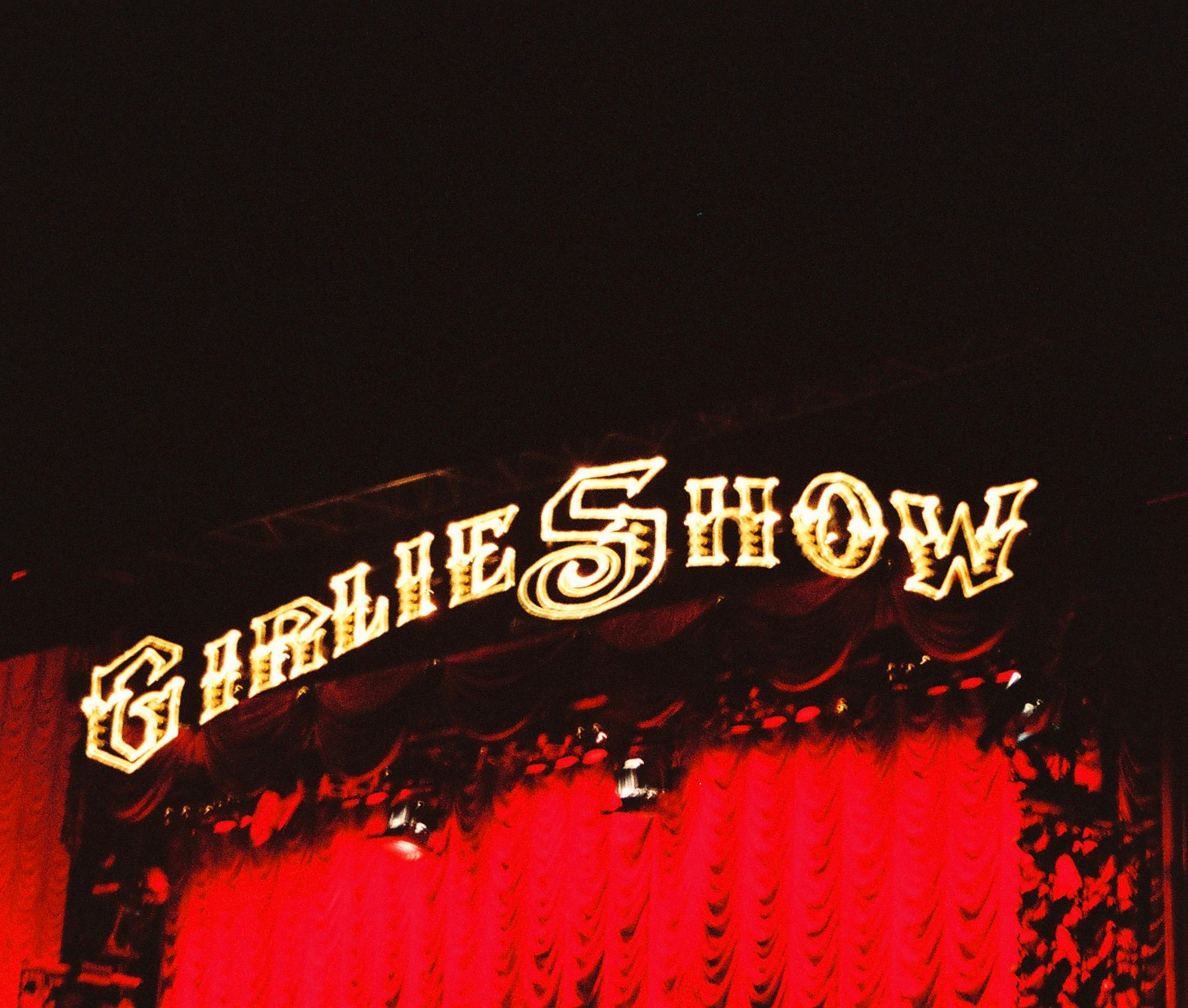
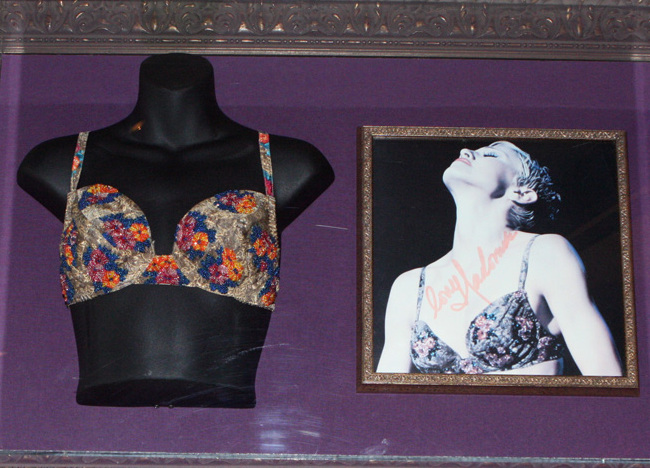
A large illuminated "Girlie Show" sign hung above the stage (top), and a bra designed by Dolce & Gabanna (bottom) worn by Madonna during the tour.

In early 1993, Madonna appointed her brother Christopher Ciccone as tour director, following their work together on the Blond Ambition tour. Ciccone was responsible for overseeing the production crew, stage design, and dancers. Working closely together, the two shaped the show around a "burlesque circus" concept, envisioned as a hybrid of rock concert, fashion show, and cabaret. Ciccone explained that the aim was to make the production "as artistic and sophisticated as we could be", noting that Madonna had become more reflective about her work and less focused on traditional pop stardom. The concept drew inspiration from a range of sources, including Bollywood cinema, Thai dance, Carol Reed's Trapeze (1956), and the work of Marlene Dietrich, Louise Brooks, Erté, and Zizi Jeanmaire. As with Blond Ambition, the Girlie Show was divided into thematic acts—Dominatrix, Studio 54, Weimar Cabaret, and an encore.

With the concept defined, Madonna and Ciccone began assembling the performing ensemble. Auditions for dancers were held in Los Angeles, advertised with a call for "androgynous boyish girls with very short hair". Madonna later said the audition process focused not only on dance ability, but also on personality, confidence, and performers' willingness to take risks. The touring ensemble ultimately included eight dancers—among them Carrie Ann Inaba—as well as longtime backing vocalists Niki Haris and Donna De Lory. Inaba later recalled that the singer told dancers during auditions that accepting the tour would require shaving their heads, a condition Madonna later clarified was intended as a test of commitment rather than one to be enforced. For the musical direction, veteran Jai Winding was brought in to lead the band, which included Michael Bearden and Mike McKnight on keyboards, Paul Pesco on guitar, Victor Bailey on bass, Omar Hakim on drums, and Luis Conte on percussion. Rehearsals began in July at Sony Pictures Studios in Culver City, where choreography and staging were developed.

Early planning also involved several choreographers, including American actor and dancer Gene Kelly, whom Madonna personally invited to choreograph the performance of "Rain". The collaboration proved short-lived, however. Kelly reportedly felt uncomfortable with the dancers—whom he believed were chosen more for personality than technical precision—as well as with the show's overt sexual tone. As tensions grew, Ciccone urged Madonna to end the partnership; the singer, "shamefaced at having single-handedly conceived of such a terrible fate for this venerable American icon", agreed with her brother and dismissed Kelly. Alex Magno was subsequently appointed as one of the tour's principal choreographers.

=== Fashion and staging ===
Costumes were designed by Dolce & Gabbana, whom Madonna instructed to study films such as My Fair Lady (1964) and Cabaret (1972) to realize the "striptease, Vegas-type show" she envisioned. Approximately 1,500 costumes were created for the tour, ranging from dominatrix-inspired outfits and sequined bras to Victorian-style dresses and cut-off denim shorts. Designer Domenico Dolce later recalled that both he and Madonna shared a "Fellinian version of the circus", citing perfection as the greatest challenge of their collaboration. Due to wear and tear, the designers continuously repaired and replaced costumes while remotely supporting the tour from Milan.

The stage design was more elaborate than those of Madonna's previous tours, featuring a catwalk extending into the audience, two hydraulic risers, and several elevated balconies. A large illuminated "Girlie Show" sign hung above the stage, flanked by oversized drawings depicting Madonna's masked face. Transporting the production across Europe required two aircraft, including the largest Soviet transport plane ever built, and assembling the stage took four days and more than 100 crew members." In an interview for MTV Australia's Girlie Talk special, Madonna explained that she cut her hair shortly before the tour after repeated dyeing caused damage, ultimately opting for a shorter, darker look inspired by her "Rain" music video to achieve a cleaner aesthetic and visually distinguish herself from the dancers.

== Concert synopsis ==
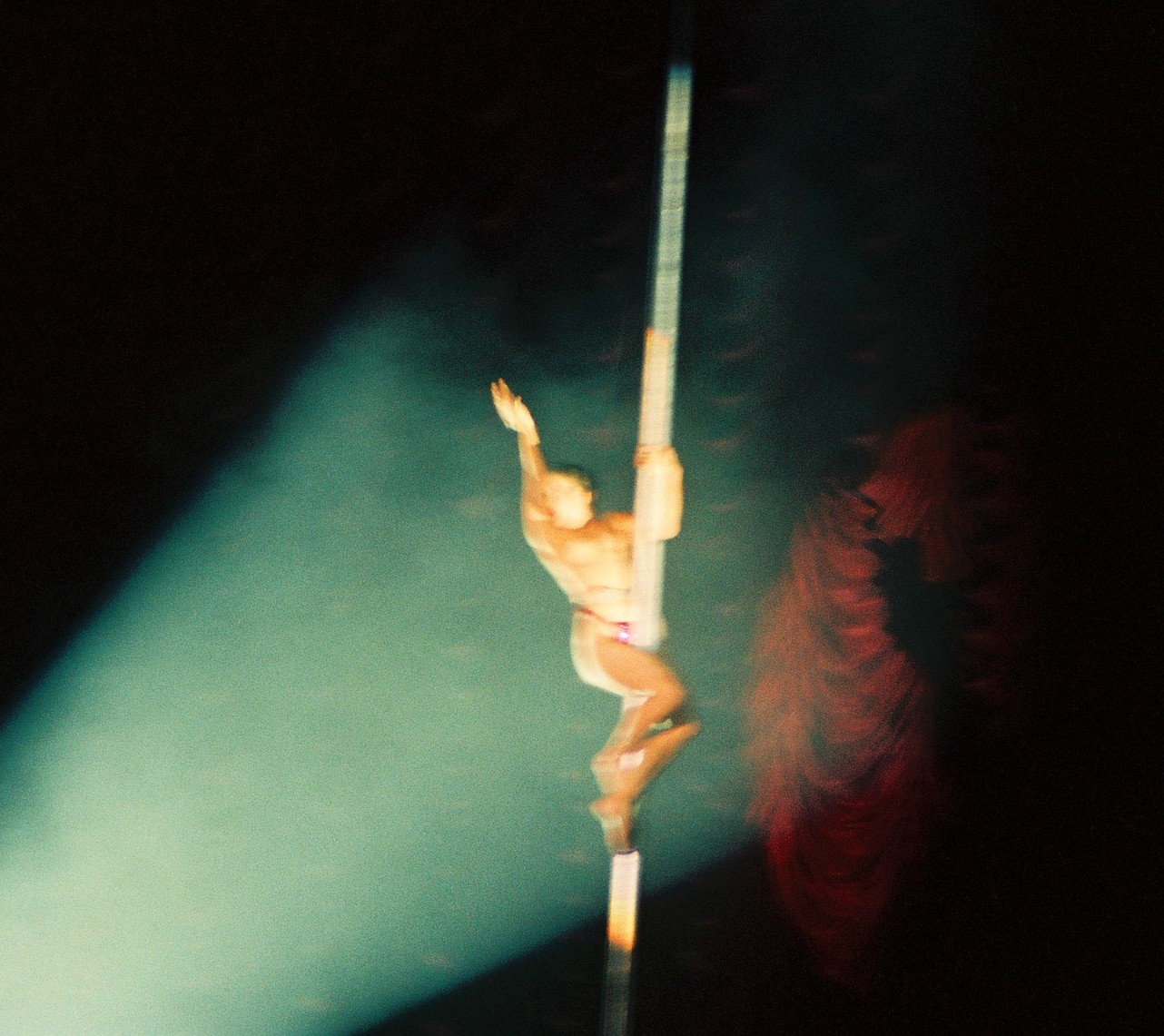
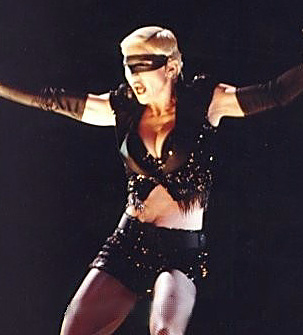
The concert opened with a topless dancer descending a pole (left), followed by Madonna's dominatrix-clad performance of "Erotica" (right)

The show opened with a calliope fanfare as a pierrot appeared onstage, a figure that would recur throughout the concert. A topless dancer then slid down a pole suspended above the stage, before Madonna emerged to perform "Erotica" as a short-haired dominatrix, dressed in a black sequined jacket and bra, hot pants, gloves, knee-high boots, and a domino mask, wielding a riding crop as her dancers posed suggestively behind her. "Fever" followed, performed with half-naked male dancers, ending with Madonna and the men disappearing inside a ring of flames. For "Vogue", she appeared in an elaborate beaded headdress and performed choreography inspired by Thai dance. The act slowed with "Rain", sung seated at center stage alongside Niki Haris and Donna De Lory, all dressed in sheer black robes. It closed with an instrumental interlude in which the pierrot and umbrella-wielding dancers evoked imagery from Singin' in the Rain (1952).

The Studio 54 segment began with "Express Yourself", introduced by a distorted voice declaring, "I'm gonna take you to a place you’ve never been before". Madonna descended from the ceiling atop a giant disco ball, wearing a blond afro wig and 1970s-style halter top and bell-bottoms, joined by Haris and De Lory in matching outfits. The transition into "Deeper and Deeper" featured a staged interruption by an apparent audience member who leapt onstage and was revealed as one of the dancers. "Why's It So Hard" escalated into an orgy-like performance, while "In This Life" brought the act to a close with Madonna alone onstage, watched from a distance by the pierrot. An interlude titled "The Beast Within" followed, featuring two male dancers performing an apocalyptic routine as Madonna recited the song's lyrics from offstage.

The Weimar Cabaret section opened with "Like a Virgin", performed in the style of Marlene Dietrich; Madonna wore a top hat and tailcoat and pronounced the word "virgin" as "wirgin". "Bye Bye Baby" followed, featuring Madonna, Haris, and De Lory in a tightly choreographed routine with three scantily clad female dancers. She then performed "I'm Going Bananas" in deliberately exaggerated, cartoonish vocals. For "La Isla Bonita", Madonna removed the tailcoat and sang atop a rising platform in a striped shirt as a bare-chested musician accompanied her on acoustic guitar. The main set ended with "Holiday", staged as a military parade with performers in trenchcoats and an American flag unfurled behind them.

The encore combined "Justify My Love" with a mashup of Sly and the Family Stone's "Everybody Is a Star" (1969) and Madonna's own "Everybody". The former featured Victorian-inspired costumes and Madonna holding a lorgnette, while the latter saw the performers change into white tops and denim shorts. As carnival music played and a red curtain fell, the pierrot reappeared—revealed to be Madonna herself—who closed the show by singing the line "Everybody is a star" before the curtain descended once more.

== Critical reception ==
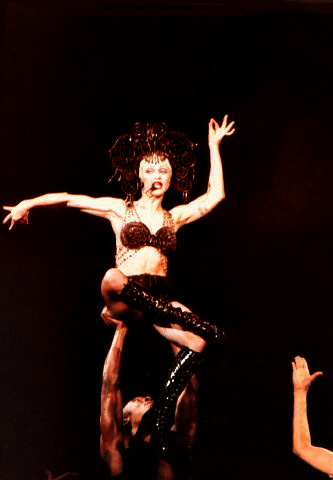
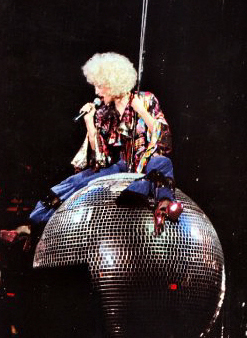
Billboard's Catherine Applefield listed "Vogue" (left) and "Express Yourself" (right) among the concert's "eye-popping moments".

The Girlie Show received generally positive reviews. In Madonna: An Intimate Biography, J. Randy Taraborrelli described the show as a "racy Barnum and Bailey circus" that, while still sexy, leaned more toward playful burlesque than outright provocation, revealing a "softer" side of the singer. Gar Graff of the Detroit Free Press similarly felt the tour was more personal than Blond Ambition, calling it a "stylish, theatrical, tightly scripted cabaret". Writing for Billboard, Thom Duffy said the production rose above its erotic hype to succeed as "pure entertainment", praising its sense of humor and concluding that Madonna could still "confound and excite her audience" despite the surrounding controversy. Writing for Time, Richard Corliss described Madonna as "the greatest show-off on earth", calling the Girlie Show "at once a movie retrospective, a Ziegfeld revue, a living video", and likening it to an R-rated take on Cirque du Soleil.

Paul Taylor of The Independent noted that the show's explicit humor and sexual references delighted much of the audience, while Entertainment Weekly's Tyler Brûlé remarked that Madonna may have lost some cultural "glitter" but remained adept at spectacle and commercial appeal. Writing for the Daily Express, Frances Hubbard suggested that Madonna was "at her worst when she turns moody and pretentious", but added that if the singer was in decline, it was a "gentle descent", concluding that she would "be around for a while yet". Jon Pareles of The New York Times, reviewing the New York performances, observed that the Girlie Show provoked fewer taboos than Blond Ambition, adding that Madonna appeared "likeable again" and sang enough live passages to dispel doubts about lip-synching. Coverage in Argentina was notably enthusiastic: reviewing the Buenos Aires shows, Clarín praised the production's visual spectacle and rhythmic drive, saying it often transformed the venue into a "giant open-air dance floor" and describing it as a "spectacular display". Jeff Kaye of the Los Angeles Times offered a more measured view, arguing that while the imagery was sexually charged, little of it felt genuinely shocking to audiences who had "seen and heard all this stuff before".

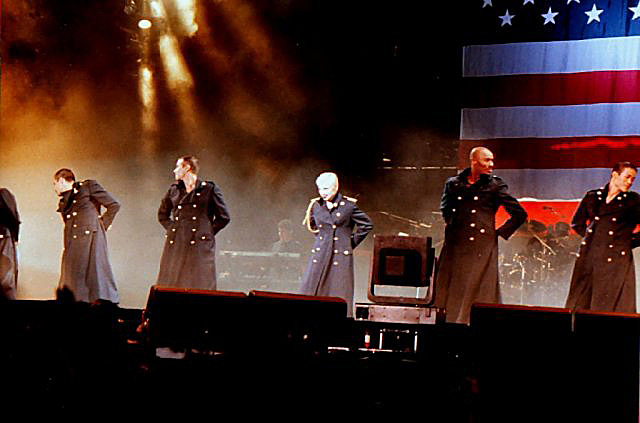
For The Sydney Morning Herald, Bruce Elder singled out the rendition of "Holiday".

Not all reviews were positive. Parts of the British press adopted what Kaye described as a "mean-spirited" tone, with one magazine declaring itself a "Madonna-free zone" during the London run. Bruce Elder of The Sydney Morning Herald offered a mixed assessment, characterizing the concert as more of a social event than a standout musical experience and questioning whether Madonna's handling of sexual themes was sincere or contrived and opportunistic. Writing for Newsday, Ira Robbins argued that the tour reduced Madonna's claims of sexual empowerment to empty provocation, likening it to a "cheesy bump-and-grind exploitation" revue. Although he acknowledged moments of polished staging and singled out performances such as "Rain", Robbins concluded that the show prioritized gimmicks and shock value over music. The Washington Post's Tom Shales was more dismissive, arguing that Madonna's attempts to shock had become "belabored self-parodies" and labeling the show "silly, not shocking". Audience reactions were mixed, with the Whitehorse Daily Star citing fans at the Montreal concert who praised Madonna's energy but criticized the emphasis on shock value and spectacle over music.

In retrospective assessments, The Advocate and VH1 ranked the Girlie Show among Madonna's stronger tours, while Billboard placed it third in its 2024 ranking, with Sal Cinquemani calling it a "visual tour-de-force" and praising her vocals and the strength of the live band.

== Commercial performance ==
The Girlie Show was a significant commercial success. In London, 15,000 tickets sold within two hours, and the opening night drew an audience of 72,000. Madonna’s first-ever concert in Israel attracted 50,000 attendees, while three shows at New York City's Madison Square Garden grossed over US$2 million. The tour also performed strongly in Latin America: three concerts in Mexico City grossed nearly US$9 million, the Buenos Aires show at River Plate Stadium drew 50,000 people, and record-breaking crowds of 86,000 in São Paulo and 120,000 in Rio de Janeiro attended the Brazilian dates. The Rio concert became the second-largest audience ever for a female artist at Maracanã Stadium, behind Tina Turner's 1988 Break Every Rule World Tour. Ticket prices across these markets averaged around US$15.

The tour was especially successful in Australia, where more than 360,000 tickets were sold. The first show sold 52,000 tickets in under 90 minutes, and the Adelaide Oval concert drew over 40,000 people, ranking among the venue’s most attended events. The Melbourne and Sydney dates sold 147,241 and 135,000 tickets, respectively, with more than 90,000 tickets sold in Sydney within an hour. Billboard reported that the eight Australian concerts grossed over US$18.5 million, contributing to a total tour gross of approximately US$70 million ($156.01 million in 2025 dollars) from 39 shows. According to Amusement Business, the Girlie Show was the highest-grossing female tour of 1993.

== Controversies ==
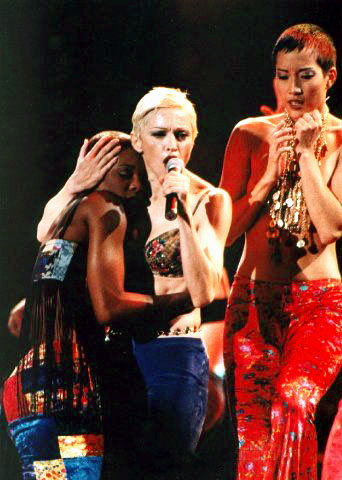
The Girlie Show was met with criticism for its provocative imagery.

The Girlie Show attracted controversy in several countries. In Germany, a planned concert in Frankfurt was condemned by conservative politicians, including Norbert Geis of Chancellor Helmut Kohl's party, who claimed the show "exceeded the bounds of decency" and called for age restrictions. The concert was ultimately canceled, with organizers citing "technical difficulties". In Israel, Orthodox Jewish groups protested Madonna's first performance in the country, with religious figures denouncing the show as offensive; despite the demonstrations, the sold-out concert proceeded as scheduled. A proposed concert in Singapore was denied approval by police, who stated that the production "bordered on the obscene".

The tour also sparked backlash in Puerto Rico, where some groups sought its cancellation over concerns about Madonna's influence on young audiences. During the concert, Madonna provoked outrage after briefly placing a Puerto Rican flag against her body and sliding it between her legs, an act condemned by politicians and civic leaders as disrespectful. Calls for censure and small-scale protests followed, though they drew limited participation. The singer's supporters defended the gesture as unintentional and non-malicious.

In Argentina, opposition came primarily from Catholic leaders. Cardinal Antonio Quarracino publicly criticized Madonna as "blasphemous and pornographic" and urged President Carlos Menem not to receive her, while other religious figures called for the concerts' cancellation. Although legal efforts to ban the shows were unsuccessful, authorities required minors under 13 to attend with an adult. Similar criticism emerged in Mexico, where religious and conservative groups accused Madonna of mocking Catholic values and urged officials to deny her entry; government representatives dismissed these appeals, maintaining that attendance was a matter of personal choice. During the concert, Madonna wore a sombrero.

Controversy also accompanied Madonna's arrival in Australia, where she was criticized for carrying a didgeridoo—an instrument traditionally restricted to male Aboriginal players—after receiving it from tour promoter Michael Gudinski. Gudinski later clarified that the instrument had been gifted to him by the band Yothu Yindi and said it would be replaced. In 2015, Madonna confirmed she still had the didgeridoo.

== Broadcasts and recordings ==
Cash Box magazine reported on November 6, 1993 that one of the Sydney Cricket Ground shows would be broadcast on HBO later that month, marking Madonna’s second collaboration with the network following the Blond Ambition broadcast in 1990. Although she initially considered filming the tour in Argentina or Mexico, Madonna ultimately chose Australia, citing her enthusiasm for the "Down Under" billing. Billboard later reported that Westwood One would simulcast the special, which aired on November 20 as Madonna Live Down Under: The Girlie Show. The broadcast opened from Club USA in New York City before cutting to the concert and achieved a 17.0 rating with a 27 share, becoming HBO's second most-watched original program of the year, behind the George Foreman vs. Tommy Morrison fight.

The special was released on VHS and LaserDisc on April 26, 1994, under the title The Girlie Show: Live Down Under. It earned Madonna a nomination for Best Long Form Music Video at the 37th Annual Grammy Awards and placed within Billboard's year-end Top Music Video charts. Additional broadcasts included BBC Radio 1's airing of the second London show on December 26, 1993, while the Fukuoka concerts were filmed and broadcast exclusively on Japanese television.

== Legacy and reassessment ==
In retrospective coverage marking the tour's 30th anniversary, i-D magazine's Ella Dorn argued that while Blond Ambition is more often cited as Madonna's defining tour, the Girlie Show was equally ambitious, particularly in its incorporation of interwar burlesque, Weimar-era imagery, and references to pre-AIDS queer culture. Dorn described the tour as a culturally significant moment in Madonna's career, highlighting its engagement with sexual politics, LGBT history, and the AIDS crisis. The article also pointed to the tour's visual references to Marlene Dietrich, German expressionism, and cabaret traditions, noting how the show combined circus spectacle with darker theatrical elements. It further interpreted performances such as "In This Life", dedicated to friends lost to AIDS, as reinforcing the tour's connection to pre-AIDS LGBT culture.

In The Saturday Paper, Australian theatre director Stephen Nicolazzo described watching The Girlie Show: Live Down Under in childhood as influential to his later work in theatre. He cited its staging, lighting, scale, and overt sexuality as formative to his visual approach, stating that he continues to reference the production in his own creative process. Nicolazzo also viewed the tour as significant for bringing queer aesthetics and symbolism to mainstream pop performances.

== Set list ==
Set list and samples adapted per Madonna's official website and the liner notes of The Girlie Show: Live Down Under.

Act 1: Dominatrix

1. "The Girlie Show Theme" (Fanfare introduction)
2. "Erotica"
3. "Fever"
4. "Vogue"
5. "Rain" (Contains excerpts from "Just My Imagination (Running Away with Me)", along with elements of "Singin' in the Rain")

Act 2: Studio 54

6. "Express Yourself"
7. "Deeper and Deeper"
8. "Why's It So Hard"
9. "In This Life"
10. "The Beast Within" (Dancers' interlude)

Act 3: Weimar Cabaret

11. "Like a Virgin" (Contains excerpts from "Falling in Love Again (Can't Help It)")
12. "Bye Bye Baby"
13. "I'm Going Bananas"
14. "La Isla Bonita"
15. "Holiday" (Contains excerpts from "Holiday for Calliope")

Act 4: Encore

16. "Justify My Love"
17. "Everybody Is a Star" / "Everybody" (Contains elements of "Dance to the Music" and "After the Dance")

Notes

- During the second New York City concert, Madonna and dancer Carlton Wilborn sang "(They Long to Be) Close to You" by the Carpenters to Wilborn's mother, who was in the audience.
- Madonna sang "Don't Cry for Me Argentina" at the Buenos Aires concerts, and "The Girl From Ipanema" at Rio de Janeiro.

== Tour dates ==
List of concerts (Note: Attributed to multiple references)
Date (1993)	City	Country	Venue	Opening act(s)	Attendance	Revenue
September 25	London	England	Wembley Stadium	—N/a	144,000	—N/a
September 26	London	England	Wembley Stadium	—N/a	144,000	—N/a
September 28	Paris	France	Palais Omnisports de Paris-Bercy	—N/a	—N/a	—N/a
September 29	Paris	France	Palais Omnisports de Paris-Bercy	—N/a	—N/a	—N/a
October 1	Paris	France	Palais Omnisports de Paris-Bercy	—N/a	—N/a	—N/a
October 4	Tel Aviv	Israel	Yarkon Park	—N/a	50,000	—N/a
October 7	Istanbul	Turkey	İnönü Stadium	Yonca Evcimik; Kenan Doğulu	54,000	—N/a
October 11	Toronto	Canada	SkyDome	U.N.V.	50,880	$1,494,532
October 12	Toronto	Canada	SkyDome	U.N.V.	50,880	$1,494,532
October 14	New York City	United States	Madison Square Garden	U.N.V.	43,353	$2,020,475
October 15	New York City	United States	Madison Square Garden	U.N.V.	43,353	$2,020,475
October 17	New York City	United States	Madison Square Garden	U.N.V.	43,353	$2,020,475
October 19	Philadelphia	United States	The Spectrum	U.N.V.	13,810	$500,280
October 21	Auburn Hills	United States	The Palace of Auburn Hills	U.N.V.	15,705	$600,355
October 23	Montreal	Canada	Olympic Stadium	Mario Pelchat	51,900	$1,650,353
October 26	Bayamón	Puerto Rico	Juan Ramón Loubriel Stadium	—N/a	20,000	—N/a
October 30	Buenos Aires	Argentina	River Plate Stadium	—N/a	120,000	—N/a
October 31	Buenos Aires	Argentina	River Plate Stadium	—N/a	120,000	—N/a
November 3	São Paulo	Brazil	Estádio do Morumbi	—N/a	86,000	—N/a
November 6	Rio de Janeiro	Brazil	Estádio do Maracanã	—N/a	120,000	—N/a
November 10	Mexico City	Mexico	Autódromo Hermanos Rodríguez	—N/a	137,234	$8,927,703
November 12	Mexico City	Mexico	Autódromo Hermanos Rodríguez	—N/a	137,234	$8,927,703
November 13	Mexico City	Mexico	Autódromo Hermanos Rodríguez	—N/a	137,234	$8,927,703
November 19	Sydney	Australia	Sydney Cricket Ground	Peter Andre	45,000	—N/a
November 24	Brisbane	Australia	ANZ Stadium	Peter Andre	50,000	—N/a
November 26	Melbourne	Australia	Melbourne Cricket Ground	Peter Andre	147,241	—N/a
November 27	Melbourne	Australia	Melbourne Cricket Ground	Peter Andre	147,241	—N/a
November 29	Melbourne	Australia	Melbourne Cricket Ground	Peter Andre	147,241	—N/a
December 1	Adelaide	Australia	Adelaide Oval	Peter Andre	40,000	—N/a
December 3	Sydney	Australia	Sydney Cricket Ground	Peter Andre	90,000	—N/a
December 4	Sydney	Australia	Sydney Cricket Ground	Peter Andre	90,000	—N/a
December 7	Fukuoka	Japan	Fukuoka Dome	—N/a	—N/a	—N/a
December 8	Fukuoka	Japan	Fukuoka Dome	—N/a	—N/a	—N/a
December 9	Fukuoka	Japan	Fukuoka Dome	—N/a	—N/a	—N/a
December 13	Tokyo	Japan	Tokyo Dome	—N/a	—N/a	—N/a
December 14	Tokyo	Japan	Tokyo Dome	—N/a	—N/a	—N/a
December 16	Tokyo	Japan	Tokyo Dome	—N/a	—N/a	—N/a
December 17	Tokyo	Japan	Tokyo Dome	—N/a	—N/a	—N/a
December 19	Tokyo	Japan	Tokyo Dome	—N/a	—N/a	—N/a
Total					1,279,123	$15,193,698

=== Cancelled dates ===
List of cancelled concerts
Date (1993)	City	Country	Venue	Reason
October 2	Frankfurt	Germany	Festhalle Frankfurt	Technical difficulties
December 10	Singapore		Singapore National Stadium	Obscenity

== Personnel ==
Adapted from The Girlie Show program.

=== Band ===
- Madonna – creator, vocals
- Niki Haris – vocals
- Donna De Lory – vocals
- Jai Winding – keyboards
- Michael Bearden – keyboards
- Paul Pesco – guitar
- Victor Bailey – bass
- Omar Hakim – drums
- Luis Conte – percussion
- Mike McKnight – additional keyboards

=== Dancers ===
- Ungela Brockman – dancer
- Christopher Childers – dancer
- Michael Gregory – dancer
- Carrie Ann Inaba – dancer
- Jill Nicklaus – dancer
- Ruthy Inchaustegui – dancer
- Luca Tommassini – dancer
- Carlton Wilborn – dancer

=== Choreographers ===
- Alex Magno – choreographer
- Keith Young – choreographer
- Michelle Johnston – choreographer
- Niki Haris – choreographer

=== Wardrobe and crew ===
- Dolce & Gabbana – designers
- Rob Saduski – designer
- Christopher Ciccone – production designer
- Jai Winding – musical director
- Jeffrey Hornaday – stage director
- Peter Morse – lighting director

== Bibliography ==
- Borzillo-Vrenna, Carrie (2008). Cherry Bomb: The Ultimate Guide to Becoming a Better Flirt, a Tougher Chick, and a Hotter Girlfriend--and to Living Life Like a Rock Star. Simon & Schuster. ISBN 978-1-4169-6116-1.
- Ciccone, Christopher; Leigh, Wendy (2008). Life with My Sister Madonna. Simon & Schuster. ISBN 978-1-4165-8762-0.
- Coupe, Stuart (2015). Gudinski: The Godfather of Australian Rock. Hachette. ISBN 978-0-7336-3310-2.
- Easlea, Daryl (2012). Madonna: Blond Ambition. Backbeat Books. ISBN 978-1-61713-034-2.
- Falconi, Francesco (2017). Mad for Madonna: La Regina del Pop. Alberto Castelvecchi. ISBN 978-8876155505.
- Fouz-Hernández, Santiago; Jarman-Ivens, Freya (2004). Madonna's Drowned Worlds. Ashgate Publishing. ISBN 978-0-7546-3372-3.
- Lenig, Stuart (2010). The Twisted Tale of Glam Rock. Greenwood Publishing Group. ISBN 978-0-313-37986-4.
- Metz, Allen; Benson, Carol (1999). The Madonna Companion: Two Decades of Commentary. Music Sales Group. ISBN 978-0-8256-7194-4.
- Morgan, Michelle (2015). Madonna. Constable & Robinson. ISBN 978-1-4721-1886-8.
- Morton, Andrew (2002). Madonna. Macmillan Publishers. ISBN 978-0-312-98310-9.
- O'Brien, Lucy (2008). Madonna: Like an Icon. Bantam Press. ISBN 978-0-593-05547-2.
- Rettenmund, Matthew (1995). Encyclopedia Madonnica. St. Martin's Press. ISBN 978-0-312-11782-5.
- Robinson, Billy (2018). Madonna en 30 secondes: Sa vie, sa musique et son influence, expliquées en moins d'une minute (in French). Hurtubise. ISBN 9782897811723.
- Strobel, Lee (1994). What Jesus Would Say to: Rush Limbaugh, Madonna, Bill Clinton, Michael Jordan, Bart Simpson, Donald Trump, Murphy Brown, Madalyn Murray O'Hair, Mother Teresa, David Letterman, & You. Zondervan. ISBN 0-310-48511-8.
- Taraborrelli, J. Randy (2002). Madonna: An Intimate Biography. Simon & Schuster. ISBN 978-0-425-18669-5.
