= The Girlie Show =

Girlie show is a term for American burlesque performances featuring comedy and nudity.

The Girlie Show may also refer to:

- Girlie Show (painting), a 1941 painting by Edward Hopper
- The Girlie Show (British TV programme), a British television series
- The Girlie Show, a fictional show in the television series 30 Rock
- The Girlie Show (tour), the fourth concert tour by Madonna
  - The Girlie Show: Live Down Under, live music video of the concert
- "Girlie Show" (Space Ghost Coast to Coast), a 1995 TV episode
