= UNV =

UNV may refer to:

- The United Nations Volunteers
- The United Nations Office in Vienna (UNOV), one of the four major UN office sites
- U.N.V. (band), an R&B group
- State College Regional Airport, whose FAA LID is UNV.
