= Bye Bye Baby (Madonna song) =

1993 single by Madonna

Single by Madonna

from the album Erotica
- Released: November 15, 1993
- Recorded: 1992
- Studio: Soundworks (New York)
- Genre: Hip hop; dance
- Length: 3:56
- Label: Maverick; Sire; Warner Bros.
- Songwriters: Madonna; Shep Pettibone; Anthony Shimkin
- Producers: Madonna; Shep Pettibone

Madonna singles chronology
"Rain" (1993)	"Bye Bye Baby" (1993)	"I'll Remember" (1994)

Licensed audio
- "Bye Bye Baby" on YouTube

"Bye Bye Baby" is a song recorded by American singer and songwriter Madonna, for her fifth studio album Erotica (1992). It was released on November 15, 1993, as the sixth and final single from the album but only in mainland Europe, Australia and New Zealand. "Bye Bye Baby" was written by Madonna, Shep Pettibone, and Anthony Shimkin and was produced by Madonna and Pettibone. The song is inspired by Madonna's emotions of that time and her S&M thoughts. Musically, it is a hip hop song, sampling a hook from LL Cool J's track "Jingling Baby", released in 1990. Madonna's vocals were filtered to make them appear as sound coming out from an answering machine. "Bye Bye Baby" features instrumentation from keyboard and lyrically finds Madonna asking questions to a lover she is about to abandon.

"Bye Bye Baby" received mixed reviews from music critics, who complimented the composition and lyrics, but were disappointed with Madonna's vocal delivery. The song received limited release worldwide, peaking at number seven in Italy, and also charting in Australia, New Zealand and Switzerland. Madonna performed "Bye Bye Baby" on the 1993 MTV Video Music Awards and on her Girlie Show World Tour the same year. For both performances, she was dressed as a Victorian gentleman in tailcoat and top hat. She and her backup singers danced with three scantily clad women in a brothel-style setting, while singing the song. Critics and authors noted the gender bending and role play in the performance, and found it to be a response to misogyny.

== Background and remixes ==
After the completion of filming A League of Their Own, Madonna began working on her fifth studio album Erotica with Shep Pettibone. The singer was feeling miserable after a string of failed relationships, and she vented out the frustration and depression in her music. According to Lucy O'Brien, author of Madonna: Like an Icon, there were no "sugar-coated" songs on the album, most of which dealt with Madonna's emotions. She appropriated a dominatrix persona called Dita, and the songwriting for the album, as well as the imagery in the coffee table book Sex, reflected her S&M thoughts. "Bye Bye Baby" was one such song written, dealing with strong emotions.

The release of "Bye Bye Baby" in Australia on November 15, 1993 coincided with Madonna's Australian leg of her Girlie Show World Tour. The single release of the song was accompanied by remixes produced by Ricky Crespo. Some of them have additional beats and horn sounds thrown into the original mix. In his review of the single, Jose F. Promis from AllMusic expressed that the album version was the best, and the "Madonna's Night On the Club" remix featured "swirling organs and guitar effects" set against an early-1990s house beat, making it the most interesting of the bunch.

== Recording and composition ==
"Bye Bye Baby" was written by Madonna, Shep Pettibone and Anthony Shimkin and was produced by Madonna and Pettibone. The song was recorded at Sound Works Studios in Astoria, New York, and samples a hook from LL Cool J's single, "Jingling Baby" (1990). Pettibone also did the sequencing, the keyboard arrangement and the programming for the track with Shimkin. Dennis Mitchell and Robin Hancock were the recording engineers for the track while George Karras was the mixing engineer. Ted Jensen did the mastering for the song with Mark Goodman as assistant engineer. Background vocals were provided by Niki Haris and Donna De Lory. For "Bye Bye Baby", Madonna and Pettibone wanted a 1940s theme, which would make the vocals sound as if they were coming out of an antique radio. In order to achieve that, they used a Pultec HLF filter. Shimkin recalled that the vocals for "Bye Bye Baby" were from the first take. He added that the filtered vocal effect were applied during recording and played with while Madonna was in front of the microphone singing.

'Bye Bye Baby'
A 23 second sample of "Bye Bye Baby", which illustrates the high treble used in Madonna's singing. The vocals also sound as if coming from an antique radio due to using filters on them.

"Bye Bye Baby" is a hip hop and dance song which begins with the declaration, "This is not a love song". A low bass is heard against a high-pitched 1960s keyboard sound. Madonna's vocals were attenuated to sound much thinner with more treble. Guitar sounds are spread throughout occasionally with shouting voices being heard in the background. The song ends with the sound of an explosion. Madonna's filtered voice sounds like an answering machine; the final line, "You fucked it up", is bleeped out like the machine's end-of-message tone. According to the sheet music published by Alfred Publishing Inc., the song is set in the time signature of common time with a fast tempo of 109 beats per minute. It is composed in the key of G minor, with Madonna's voice in a high register, spanning between F_{3} to A_{4}. The song has a basic sequence of G–B♭–G–D–G–Dm as its chord progression.

In the song, lyrically Madonna asks questions for a lover she is about to abandon: "Does it make you feel good to see me cry? I think it does", she affirms. The lyric "I'd like to hurt you" was compared to that of Madonna's previous single "Erotica", where she said: "I only hurt the ones I love". Richard Harrington from The Washington Post noted that Madonna used a "sonically filtered, detached and slightly taunting voice to talk about taking control rather than exacting revenge on a domineering, mind-game-playing partner" in the song. Regarding the lyrics, Chris Willman from the Los Angeles Times called "Bye Bye Baby" a "brushoff song".

== Critical response ==
"Bye Bye Baby" received mostly mixed reviews from critics. Stephen Holden of The New York Times described it as "sly, spunky". J. D. Considine from The Baltimore Sun praised the song by saying: "It's when [Madonna] and her co-producers push beyond the expected – as with the dense, gimmicky groove of "Bye Bye Baby" [...] the album really heats up, providing a sound that is body-conscious in the best sense of the term." David Browne from Entertainment Weekly wrote that Madonna was "honest" in the song. Louis Virtel of The Backlot included the song on his list of "The 100 Greatest Madonna Songs", describing its composition as "a hip-hop kiss-off with cabaret flair." Michael R. Smith from The Daily Vault found the track to be "defiant" and "in-your-face". He realized that Madonna directed the lyrics to her past relationships with actor Warren Beatty and comedian Sandra Bernhard. In 2018, Billboard picked it as the singer's 60th greatest single, calling it "one of the oddball highlights on the most ambitious album in her catalog".

Arion Berger from Rolling Stone noticed the story line of Madonna "dumping" her lover in the song, but felt that her vocals were "infantile" and her delivery was "flat". He added that her singing did not sound "assertive" and that "[Madonna] could be a drag queen toying with a pop hit of the past." Rikky Rooksby, author of The Complete Guide to the Music of Madonna, felt that the "aggressive" lyrics and the profanity at the end of the song, did not suit the erotic vibe of the album, "and strengthens the air of narcissism and calculation". O'Brien noticed Madonna's vocals as cool and minimal, but sounding "flat". She criticized the dance beat of the song for being "barely discernible" adding that Madonna sounds "like she is either not fully concentrating, or doesn't have many resources to draw on – what alternative healers would call 'scattered chi', a depleted life force." While ranking Madonna's singles, in honor of her 60th birthday, Jude Rogers from The Guardian placed "Bye Bye Baby" at number 55, writing that "[Madonna’s] babyish 1940s-style vocals, filtered to sound like they’re wavering through a wireless, still crackle with charm".

== Chart performance ==
"Bye Bye Baby" received limited release, being officially released in Australasia, Germany and Japan. However, it peaked at number seven on the Italian Singles Chart despite not being officially released as a single in that country. It became the fifth single from the Erotica album to place within the top 10 there. On November 25, 1993, "Bye Bye Baby" debuted at number 39 on the Swiss Hitparade chart, and after three weeks it rose to its peak of number 28, before dropping off the chart. On December 5, 1993, the song debuted on the Australian Singles Chart at number 31. The next week, it peaked at number 15 on the chart. On February 6, 1994, after eight weeks, it fell off the chart. "Bye Bye Baby" entered the New Zealand charts at number 49 the chart week of November 25, 1993, but fell off the chart the following week. It re-entered the chart week of January 23, 1994, ultimately peaking at number 43.

== Live performances ==
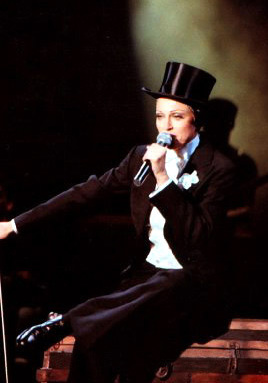
Madonna, dressed as a Victorian gentleman, performs "Bye Bye Baby" on The Girlie Show World Tour in 1993

On September 2, 1993, Madonna opened the 1993 MTV Video Music Awards performing "Bye Bye Baby". She cavorted on stage with three scantily clad women in a brothel-style setting, dressed in tuxedos and top hats, in a choreographed, highly sexual routine. According to choreographer Alex Magno, he wanted to do "Justify My Love" or "The Beast Within" on MTV, but Madonna decided that they might be too controversial for live television and abandoned the idea. Nevertheless, "Bye Bye Baby" was chosen and performed with the choreography they had been practicing for The Girlie Show World Tour, since it represented the whole idea behind the tour. Louis Virtel from The Backlot ranked the performance at number eight on a list for "Madonna's 11 Greatest VMA Moments". He praised Madonna's rendition of the song at the Video Music Awards, calling it "a hell of a VMA performance" and a "killer cinematic throwback".

The performance of the song on the Girlie Show tour featured Madonna and her backup singers, DeLory and Haris, dressed as Victorian gentlemen in masculine outfits, including top hats and tailcoat. The whole ensemble was an homage to actress Marlene Dietrich in the 1930 American romance drama film Morocco, with the singer carrying a cane in her hands. The main inspiration behind this segment was 1900s showgirls and Japanese all-female cross dressing dance company, Takarazuka Revue. Madonna transformed her voice into that of a circus ringmaster, introducing the arrival of three female strip-club dancers. A voice-alteration similar to the single was used in the performance. The dance routine revolved around three chairs. The female strippers seduced Madonna and the backup singers, by rubbing against them, holding sexual poses and dominated them, before they took control again. The performance on the November 19, 1993 show at Sydney Cricket Ground was recorded and released on VHS and Laserdisc on April 26, 1994, as The Girlie Show: Live Down Under.

Brett Beemyn noted in his book, Queer Studies, that Madonna was expanding on the characteristic butch and femme portrayal with the performance. He added that on a mere glance the performance might appear to be a "typical provoking one" from the singer, but underlying it was a "more complex queer perspective". The butch roles are played by white and African-American women, while the strippers were played by Asian-American women. There are simulations of masturbation and sexual penetration in the performance, while the butch females control the femmes. Beemyn concluded by saying that "the fact that Madonna chose Asian-American women as the femmes reinforces stereotypes of Asian women as the passive, exotic, and feminine 'other'. It also mocks the fact Asian women have been exploited as 'comfort girls' for American servicemen, therefore, Madonna made a statement against male chauvinism, in her queer way." For Gerry Bloustien, author of Girl Making, the performances of both "Bye Bye Baby" and "Like a Virgin" on the tour emphasized the "blurring of gender and representation".

== Track listings and formats ==
- European and Australian CD single
1. "Bye Bye Baby" (album version) – 3:56
2. "Bye Bye Baby" (N.Y. Hip Hop Mix) – 3:51
3. "Bye Bye Baby" (California Hip Hop Jazzy) – 3:43
4. "Bye Bye Baby" (Madonna's Night on the Club) – 5:16
5. "Bye Bye Baby" (Rick Does Madonna's Dub) – 6:20
6. "Bye Bye Baby" (House Mix) – 3:50
7. "Bye Bye Baby" (Madonna Gets Hardcore) – 4:24
- European 7-inch and Australian cassette single
1. "Bye Bye Baby" (album version) – 3:56
2. "Bye Bye Baby" (N.Y. Hip Hop Mix) – 3:51
- European 12-inch maxi-single
1. "Bye Bye Baby" (N.Y. Hip Hop Mix) – 3:51
2. "Bye Bye Baby" (Madonna's Night on the Club) – 5:16
3. "Bye Bye Baby" (Tallahassee Pop) – 3:48
4. "Bye Bye Baby" (Rick Does Madonna's Dub) – 6:20
- Japanese 3-inch CD single
1. "Bye Bye Baby" (album version) – 3:56
2. "Rain" (radio remix) – 4:33
- Digital single (2022)
1. "Bye Bye Baby" – 3:56
2. "Bye Bye Baby" (N.Y. Hip Hop Mix) – 3:49
3. "Bye Bye Baby" (California Hip Hop Jazzy) – 3:50
4. "Bye Bye Baby" (Madonna's Night on the Club) – 5:20
5. "Bye Bye Baby" (Rick Does Madonna's Dub) – 6:34
6. "Bye Bye Baby" (House Mix) – 3:52
7. "Bye Bye Baby" (Madonna Gets Hardcore) – 4:26
8. "Bye Bye Baby" (Tallahassee Pop) – 3:50

== Credits and personnel ==
Credits adapted from Erotica album liner notes.

=== Management ===
- Recorded at Sound Works Studios, Astoria, New York, New York City
- Warner Bros. Music Corporation / Bleu Disque Music Company, Webo Girl Publishing, Inc. (ASCAP)
- Administration by Warner Bros. Music Corporation, Shep Songs by MCA Music Publishing (ASCAP)

=== Personnel ===
- Madonna – lead vocals, songwriter, producer
- Shep Pettibone – songwriter, producer, sequencing, keyboard, programming
- Anthony Shimkin – songwriter, sequencing, keyboards, programming
- Dennis Mitchell – recording engineer
- Robin Hancock – recording engineer
- George Karras – mixing engineer
- Ted Jensen – mastering at Sterling Sound Studios, New York
- Mark Goodman – assistant engineer
- Donna De Lory – background vocals
- Niki Haris – background vocals

== Charts ==
Chart (1993–1994)	Peak position
Australia (ARIA)	15
Finland (Suomen virallinen lista)	17
Italy (Musica e dischi)	7
New Zealand (Recorded Music NZ)	43
Switzerland (Schweizer Hitparade)	28

== Bibliography ==
- Beemyn, Brett; Eliason, Mickey (1996). Queer Studies: A Lesbian, Gay, Bisexual, & Transgender Anthology. NYU Press. ISBN 9780814712580.
- Bloustien, Gary (2003). Girl Making: A Cross-cultural Ethnography on the Processes of Growing Up Female. Berghahn Books. ISBN 9781571814258.
- Metz, Allen; Benson, Carol (1999). The Madonna Companion: Two Decades of Commentary. Music Sales Group. ISBN 0825671949.
- Morton, Andrew (2002). Madonna. St. Martin's Press. ISBN 0312983107.
- O'Brien, Lucy (2008). Madonna: Like an Icon. Bantam Press. ISBN 9780552153614.
- Rooksby, Rikky (2004). The Complete Guide to the Music of Madonna. Omnibus Press. ISBN 0-7119-9883-3.
