= Rain (Madonna song) =

1993 single by Madonna

Single by Madonna

from the album Erotica
- B-side: "Up Down Suite"; "Waiting"
- Released: August 5, 1993
- Recorded: 1992
- Studio: Mastermix (New York City); Soundworks (New York City)
- Genre: Pop
- Length: 5:24
- Label: Maverick; Sire; Warner Bros.
- Songwriters: Madonna; Shep Pettibone
- Producers: Madonna; Shep Pettibone

Madonna singles chronology
"Fever" (1993)	"Rain" (1993)	"Bye Bye Baby" (1993)

Music video
- "Rain" on YouTube

"Rain" is a song by American singer Madonna from her fifth studio album, Erotica (1992). Written and produced with Shep Pettibone, it is a pop ballad with elements of R&B, trip-hop, and new-age music, featuring lyrics that liken rainfall to the power of love. Released as single on August 5, 1993, it was later included on her ballad compilation Something to Remember (1995).

Contemporary reviews were generally favorable, with several critics singling out "Rain" as a highlight of Erotica and praising Madonna's vocal performance. The single peaked at number 14 on the US Billboard Hot 100, number two in Canada, and entered the top ten in the United Kingdom.

Directed by Mark Romanek, the accompanying music video depicts Madonna performing before a Japanese film crew and won Best Art Direction and Best Cinematography at the MTV Video Music Awards. The song was performed live on the Girlie Show (1993) and Celebration (2023–2024) concert tours, and used as video interlude during the Sticky & Sweet Tour (2008–2009). It has since been covered by several artists, including Madonna's former backing vocalists Donna De Lory and Niki Haris.

== Background and release ==
In early 1992, Madonna founded her own multi-media entertainment company, Maverick, consisting of a record label (Maverick Records), a film production arm (Maverick Films), and divisions for music publishing, television broadcasting, book publishing, and merchandising. The first two projects from the venture were her fifth studio album, titled Erotica, and a coffee table book of photographs entitled Sex. For Erotica, Madonna primarily collaborated with American producer Shep Pettibone, with whom she had worked during the 1980s on remixes of several singles. Pettibone recalled that the first songs he and the singer developed for the album were the title track, "Deeper and Deeper", "Thief of Hearts", and "Rain". According to the producer, he typically composed the music while Madonna wrote the lyrics. He came up with "Rain" the night before Madonna was scheduled to enter the studio: "It was a Sunday, it was raining — ha! — and she wrote the words, and sang the song and harmonies all in that day. ['Rain'] came together very quickly". The Northampton Herald & Post reported that "Rain" had originally been written for a musical adaptation of Wuthering Heights. Publicist Liz Rosenberg stated that "Rain", along with "Angel" (1985), was intended as a tribute to singer Karen Carpenter, whom Madonna cited as an influence.

In the United States and the United Kingdom, "Rain" was released as the final single from Erotica on August 5, 1993. (Note: Madonna's official website reports a release date of August 5, 1993. Other sources, including AllMusic and biographer Daryl Easlea, however, cite July 1993.) The commercial single contained four tracks: the radio remix and album version of "Rain", a remix of Erotica track "Waiting" with a rap by House of Pain frontman Everlast, and the non-album cut "Up Down Suite". The radio remix of "Rain" differs only slightly from the album version, featuring a subtly altered production. When the song was later included on Madonna's 1995 ballad compilation Something to Remember, the album version was used, leaving the radio remix exclusive to the physical single release until it was reissued digitally in 2022.

== Recording and composition ==
"Rain" was written and produced by Madonna and Shep Pettibone. It was recorded at the Mastermix and Soundworks Studios in New York City, along with the rest of the Erotica album. Personnel working on the song included Pettibone on sequencing, keyboard arrangement, and programming; Anthony Shimkin on drum programming; Dennis Mitchell and Robin Hancock as recording engineers; and Goh Hotoda as mixing engineer.

"Rain"
30-second sample of "Rain", a pop ballad with R&B, trip-hop, and New-age influences.

Musically, it is a pop ballad with influences from R&B, trip hop, and new-age music. (Note: Attributed to The A.V. Club, Billboard, and Parade.) Richard Harrington of The Washington Post and Fiona MacPherson-Amador of Collider both characterized the song as optimistic, with the latter noting how its harmonic structure creates a sense of relief. "Rain" drew comparisons to the work of Peter Gabriel, as well as Jimmy Jam and Terry Lewis. Billboard further characterized the track by its gentle rhythmic pulse and shimmering layers of synthesizers. The A.V. Club described the arrangement as evoking a cleansing atmosphere, with percussive patterns reminiscent of falling rain and production that drew on British downtempo and trip hop styles. Orchestra hits accentuate the tension before it resolves in a more hopeful tone during the bridge. The Independent observed that its use of reverse tom drums and rhythmic synthesizer effects recalled Scritti Politti's 1985 track "Perfect Way". Parry Gettelman of the Orlando Sentinel compared the inclusion of rain sounds to the experimental use of typewriter clicks and breaking glass on other Erotica tracks.

According to Rikky Rooksby, author of The Complete Guide to the Music of Madonna, the bridge shifts from B♭ major to C major and features two spoken passages in the left and right channels following a sung "Here comes the sun", a nod to the Beatles' 1969 song. Rooksby also noted the song's "dynamic" crescendo toward the end, which John Myers of Yahoo! Voices described as an "escape from the deluge of the rain with the breaking of the sun".

Lyrically, "Rain" uses water and rainfall as metaphors for love, presenting both as restorative forces capable of washing away past heartache. MacPherson-Amador viewed the song as an expression of emotional intimacy, describing its lyrics as a narrative about the joy of being "seen and heard" and arguing that they present affection as something that transcends physical intimacy. In one part, Madonna sings: "When you looked into my eyes/And you said goodbye/Could you see my tears/When I turned the other way". Author James Gavin viewed the refrain "Rain, wash away my sorrow, take away my pain" as expressing a desire for human connection and peace. Author Mark Bego has suggested that the lyrics also carry a sexual subtext, linking the song's use of rain to themes explored elsewhere on Erotica, particularly "Where Life Begins", which employs similar imagery as a metaphor for sexual arousal. Billboard's Chuck Arnold interpreted the song as reflecting "love in the age of AIDS".

== Critical reception ==
In general, "Rain" received positive reviews from music critics, with several identifying it as a highlight of Erotica, and has retrospectively been ranked among Madonna's best songs. (Note: Attributed to AllMusic, Blender, The Buffalo News, the Minnesota Star Tribune, the Sun-Sentinel, and author Mark Bego.) (Note: Attributed to The Advocate, The A.V. Club, TheBacklot.com, Billboard, Classic Pop, The Detroit News, Jenesaispop, Parade, PinkNews, and USA Today.) Larry Flick of Billboard described it as "gorgeous", while Giles Smith of The Independent considered it the closest the album came to "the Madonna of Like a Prayer [...] a big and solemn ballad". Stephen Holden of The New York Times singled it out as one of Erotica's softer moments, describing it as "one happy, open-hearted love song", and Dave Sholin of the Gavin Report predicted a "deluge of airplay", praising its optimistic romantic tone and sensuality. Anthony Violanti of The Buffalo News highlighted the song's emotional intensity, while Neil Randall of the Waterloo Region Record praised it as "creative and gripping" and "every bit as soul-probing as we've seen of her". Arion Berger of Rolling Stone identified it as one of the songs that sustained the album's "icy tone".

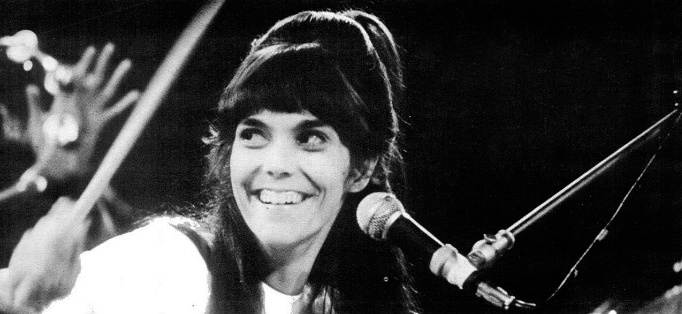
Madonna's vocals on "Rain" were likened to those of Karen Carpenter (pictured in 1973).

Saeed Saeed of The National and MacPherson-Amador both regarded "Rain" as underrated; Saeed praised its "ethereal beauty", while MacPherson-Amador described it as a "victory" that balances Madonna's boldness and tenderness. Matthew Barton of The Quietus deemed it one of the singer's most gorgeous ballads, while Vanity Fair España contributor Guillermo Alonso called it "the Madonna ballad" — a cold, mechanical yet perfectly realized piece. Critics including Eric Henderson of Slant Magazine, AllMusic's Jose F. Promis, and Classic Pop's Rik Flynnn identified "Rain" as anticipating the softer "post-Sex" sound and image Madonna would adopt in the mid-1990s. Mayer Nissim from PinkNews compared its "shimmering, trippy Gaia vibe" to the sound Madonna would later explore on Ray of Light (1998), while Sebastián E. Alonso of Spanish website Jenesaispop described "Rain" as a precursor to songs from that album such as "Swim", as well as later works like "Wash All Over Me" (2015).

Madonna's vocal performance was a frequent topic of discussion among critics. Randall found it "even more vocally inspiring" than her work with Stephen Sondheim on I'm Breathless (1990). Although he considered the song highly commercial, Tom Ford of the Toledo Blade highlighted Madonna's vocal versatility. Sal Cinquemani of Slant Magazine praised her harmonies, which Stephen Thomas Erlewine later described as "comforting and consoling". Jude Rogers of The Guardian emphasized the sense of longing in Madonna's delivery, noting how it shifts from hope to welcome and finally release. Troy J. Augusto of Cash Box compared Madonna's vocals to those of Karen Carpenter, observing that she "almost sounds like [Karen Carpenter], all tender and shy", a comparison later echoed by author Matthew Rettenmund, who wrote that "Rain" was a ballad that could make the late Carpenter "greener with envy".

There were critics who offered mixed to negative commentary. Matthew Jacobs of HuffPost felt that "Rain" was not particularly distinctive among Madonna's ballads, while Rooksby considered its lyrical theme overused and Caroline Sullivan described it as impersonal. Deborah Wilker of the Sun-Sentinel deemed it one of the "mere also-rans" despite calling it a highlight of Erotica. Chris Willman of the Los Angeles Times criticized its "terribly banal" rhymes. Alfred Soto (Stylus Magazine) and Chuck Campbell (The Mississippi Press) regarded the song as derivative and out of place on the album.

== Commercial performance ==
In the United States, "Rain" debuted at number 52 on the Billboard Hot 100 in the issue dated July 24, 1993. It peaked at number 14 on September 11 and spent a total of 20 weeks on the chart. On Billboard's Adult Contemporary ranking, the song reached number 7. At the end of 1993, it placed 67th on the Hot 100 year-end list and 38th on the Adult Contemporary chart. In August 2024, Billboard ranked it as Madonna's 40th most successful Hot 100 entry. In Canada, Rain entered the RPM 100 Hit Tracks chart at number 95 on July 17, 1993. It eventually peaked at number 2, kept from the top spot by Mariah Carey's "Dreamlover". It also reached number 7 on RPM's Adult Contemporary Tracks chart and finished as the 15th best-selling single of the year in Canada.

In the United Kingdom, "Rain" debuted and peaked at number 7 on the UK Singles Chart on July 31, 1993, spending a total of eight weeks on the chart. By 2008, Music Week reported sales of more than 130,000 copies. Elsewhere in Europe, the single reached the top ten in Ireland and Italy, the top 20 in Sweden and Switzerland, and the top 30 in Austria and Germany. In the Netherlands, it barely entered the top 40. Across the continent, "Rain" peaked at number 15 on the European Hot 100 Singles chart. In Australia, "Rain" debuted at number 21 and peaked at number 5. It was certified gold by the Australian Recording Industry Association (ARIA) for shipments of 35,000 units. In New Zealand, the single was less successful, stalling at number 20.

== Music video ==
=== Background and filming ===
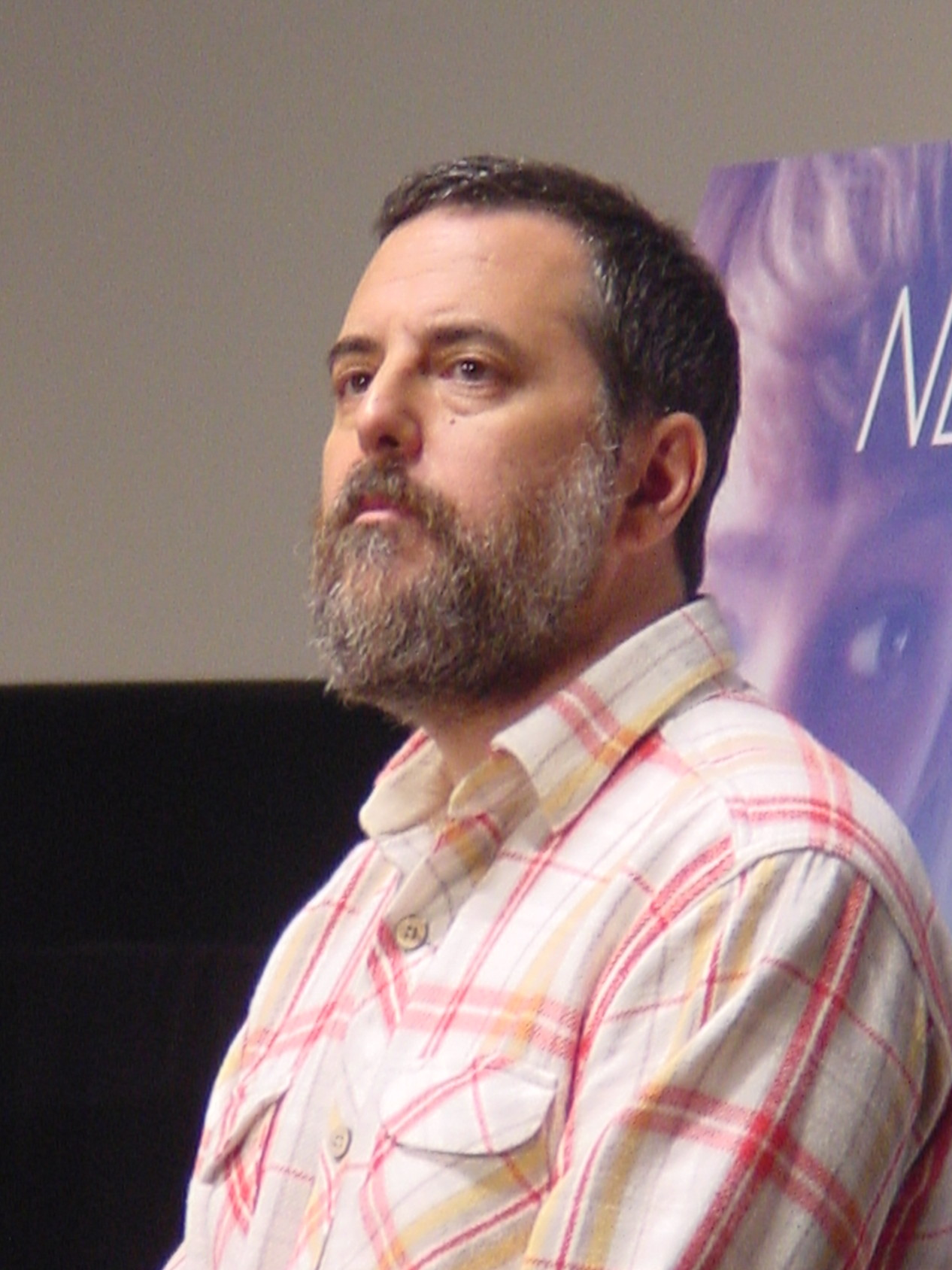
The music video for "Rain" was directed by Mark Romanek (pictured in 2010).

The music video for "Rain" was directed by American filmmaker and photographer Mark Romanek. When approached, Romanek initially declined, feeling "intimidated" by the idea of handling a romantic song and something that would depart from Madonna's "ostentatious antics" of the period. He eventually agreed after proposing a futuristic concept, contrasting with the singer's preference for a black-and-white, traditionally romantic treatment. The final concept portrayed her as a "doe-eyed ingénue" shooting a music video in Japan, the only Western on set to emphasize her outsider status. The aesthetic drew from Japanese designers Yohji Yamamoto and Rei Kawakubo, and from a Jean-Baptiste Mondino/Yves Saint Laurent commercial starring Catherine Deneuve.

For the role of the director in the video-within-a-video, Madonna approached Jean-Luc Godard and Federico Fellini, though both declined; Fellini reportedly sent a handwritten note of apology. The part ultimately went to Ryuichi Sakamoto, chosen for being what Romanek called the "most iconic and famous and attractive Japanese icon". Argentine model Daniel Rossi, then rumored to be romantically linked to Madonna, also appeared in the video, alongside American model Jenny Shimizu, who was likewise linked to the singer at the time. Filming took place at the Santa Monica Airport. The space was arranged as a studio with visible equipment, including wires, cameras, and lights, while the Japanese crew moved freely in front of the cameras and around Madonna. The production team included producer Krista Montagna, stylist David Bradshaw, editors John Murray and Jim Haygood, cinematographer Harris Savides, and production designer Jan Peter Flack. Among the set pieces was Marc Newson's 1986 Lockhead Lounge chaise.

Romanek sought to avoid a literal interpretation of the song, using two large water walls on either side of Madonna to evoke its "crystalline" quality. Half-day camera tests were conducted for colored closeups of her face, using a German lighting fixture to create a "modern, yet classic" look. Her appearance was inspired by 1940s Paris and Édith Piaf: close-cropped black hair, spiky bangs, intensely blue contact lenses, porcelain-toned makeup, and rosy lips. She additionally regrew her eyebrows at Romanek's request. Wardrobe was provided by Rei Kawakubo of Comme des Garcons and Vivienne Westwood. According to author Daryl Easlea, the shoot proved one of the most demanding of Madonna's career, requiring her to remain soaked in water for five consecutive days; although filmed in black-and-white, the footage was later hand-colored entirely in blue.

=== Reception ===
In the United Kingdom, the music video premiered on Top of the Pops on July 15, 1993. Upon release, it received positive reviews. Commentators highlighted Madonna’s appearance. Billboard's Deborah Russell described it as "chic yet vulnerable, glamorous yet sweet", while Maureen Sajbel of the Los Angeles Times wrote that her look was striking, noting her hairstyle, makeup, and the visual techniques used to accentuate her blue eyes. The staff of The Advocate described the video as "gorgeous" and praised its enduring quality. At the 1993 MTV Video Music Awards, Flack won Best Art Direction and Savides won Best Cinematography, while at the Billboard Music Video Awards it was nominated for Clip of the Year and earned Romanek the Director of the Year award. Russell later ranked "Rain" the ninth-best music video of 1993. "Rain" has since appeared on Madonna's compilations The Video Collection 93:99 (1999) and Celebration: The Video Collection (2009), as well as on the DVD The Work of Director Mark Romanek (2005). Nearly forty minutes of outtakes from the video leaked online on late July 2015.

The video has a scene of Madonna with short black hair kissing a man.

Retrospectively, Rolling Stone named "Rain" among Madonna's best music videos, while Slant Magazine placed it at number 70 on its list of the 100 greatest music videos; critics Sal Cinquemani and Ed Gonzalez praised its beauty and called it a "refreshing break" from the "sex-drenched" Erotica era. Bryant Frazer of website Studio Daily commended it for pushing "the boundaries of telecine work at the time", while Classic Pop's Mark Lindores described it as one of Madonna's most beautiful works. Christopher Rosa of VH1 described it as "simple [and] electric", dubbing it one of the singer's most underrated videos and comparing her cropped hairstyle to Mia Farrow's. In a separate review of The Work of Director Mark Romanek DVD, Gonzalez further described "Rain" as one of Romanek's "more rewarding works", praising its striking iconography and ability to "take your breath away". Jef Rouner of the Houston Press ranked it the ninth-best video directed by Romanek, calling it "light-hearted" and a "fascinating treatise on the act of creating a music video itself".

=== Analysis ===
Writers have examined the video's engagement with Japan. Dave Marsh and James Bernard included it in The New Book of Rock Lists (1994) as an example of Japanese cultural influence on contemporary arts. More critically, Kaby Wing-Sze Kung analyzed it in Reconceptualizing the Digital Humanities in Asia: New Representations of Art, History and Culture through the lens of Orientalism. She pointed to Madonna's styling, the presence of Shimizu, and the use of an all-Japanese crew led by Sakamoto, describing these elements as "racist cosmetology" and linking them to a broader trend of white performers adopting Asian-inspired looks. Similarly, Santiago Fouz-Hernández and Freya Jarman-Ivens, authors of Madonna's Drowned Worlds, argued that certain videos—including "Rain"—often framed her in contrast to racialized "others". They note that she later moved toward adopting non-Western identities, a shift reflected in videos such as "Secret" and "Take a Bow" (both 1994), "Frozen" (1998), "Nothing Really Matters" (1999), as well as in performances from 2001's Drowned World Tour.

Fouz-Hernández and Jarman-Ivens also offered an alchemical reading of the video, highlighting its use of water. They compared it to the fire imagery in the video for the preceding single "Fever", arguing that Madonna's body in "Rain" becomes a "water-body" that reinforces the video's themes of change and fluidity. In Experiencing Music Video: Aesthetics and Cultural Context (2004), Carol Vernallis wrote that the video evokes "cavernous, empty corridors of the mind", noting that it allows viewers to read emotion into Madonna's facial expressions.

== Live performances ==
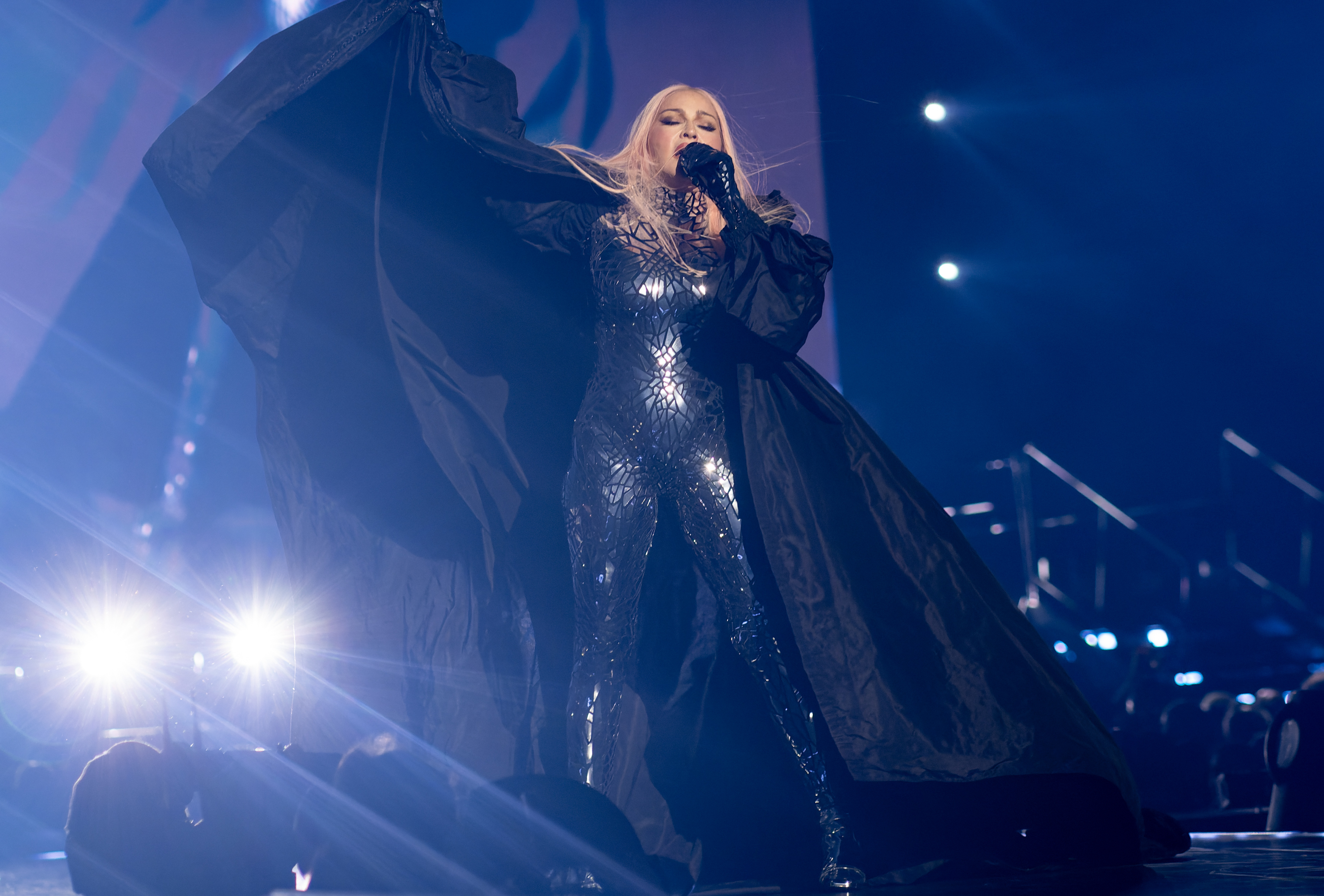
Madonna singing "Rain" during one of the London concerts of the Celebration Tour (2023―2024)

During the Girlie Show of 1993, Madonna performed "Rain" with backing vocalists Niki Haris and Donna De Lory, incorporating lines from the Temptations' 1971 song "Just My Imagination (Running Away with Me)". The stage was bathed in blue light, with the three women wearing long black choir robes. Haris later recalled it was the "first time [on stage] we sat down together and felt our harmonies. Madonna's voice was starting to get strong and she was into trying new things". J. D. Considine of The Baltimore Sun praised the performance, noting that although Madonna "just sat and sang", it "hardly took away from ['Rain']'s gorgeous harmonies". A rendition from the Sydney concert was featured in the tour's 1994 video release.

A mashup of "Rain" and Eurythmics' "Here Comes the Rain Again" (1984) was used as video interlude on the Sticky & Sweet Tour (2008–2009). The accompanying visuals featured an animated "alien woman chasing fish", as noted by the San Francisco Chronicle's Aidin Vaziri. Onstage dancers performed choreography with Eastern influences. Reviewing the Barcelona concert, Lourdes López of La Vanguardia criticized the segment, feeling it "bordered on boring". A performance from Buenos Aires was captured for the tour's live album (2010).

On the Celebration Tour (2023–2024), "Rain" was staged with a dancer embracing Madonna, dressed in a long cape, before "pull[ing] her into the darkness", as observed by PopMatters' Chris Rutherford. OutInPerth described the number as "anti-climactic", while André Hereford of Metro Weekly praised it as a "powerful vocal [performance] in a night where her lungs and body worked prodigiously".

== Covers and use in media ==
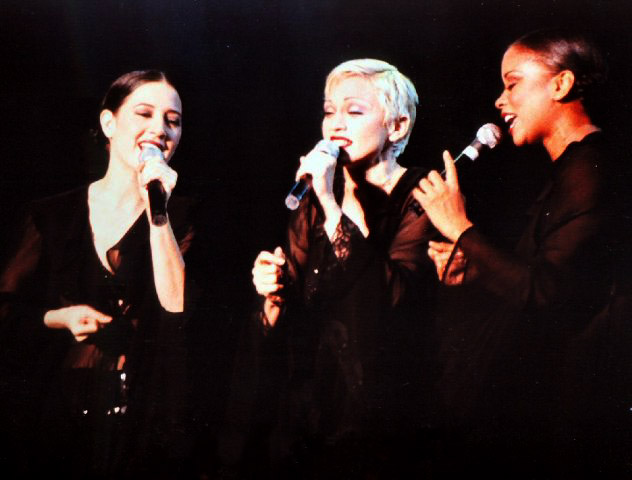
Madonna singing "Rain" on the Girlie Show (1993) with backing vocalists Donna De Lory (left) and Niki Haris (right). The pair recorded their own version of the song in 2016.

In 2000, British gothic rock band Rosetta Stone covered "Rain" for the tribute album Virgin Voices 2000: A Tribute to Madonna, which AllMusic's Heather Phares regarded as one of its finest moments. A year later, a rendition by Who's That Girl! was featured on Exposed, released through Almighty Records. The Vitamin String Quartet recorded the track for The String Quartet Tribute to Madonna (2002), while Los Angeles–based band Motor Industries contributed their version to The Dancefloor Tribute to Madonna (2003). In 2008, the Da Capo Players and Vitamin String Quartet included a cover of "Rain" on Strung Out on Madonna: The String Quartet Tribute. That same year, Melissa Totten released a remix titled "Klubkidz House Party Mix" on her album Forever Madonna.

In May 2016, Donna De Lory and Niki Haris issued an acoustic recording of "Rain" as a digital single, accompanied by a remix from Willie Ray Lewis; an extended play (EP) with four additional remixes followed in October. Explaining their choice to revisit the song, Haris told HuffPost: "[The lyrics] are indicative of the many years [Donna and I] have been together, alternating between sunshine and stormy [...] We feel blessed every time we sing [it]". "Rain" was later featured in the 2019 film Uncut Gems, playing during a scene in which Adam Sandler's character returns to his apartment to find it empty and dark. MEL magazine's Joseph Longo highlighted its use as a rare "moment of calm" that contrasted with the film's otherwise relentless tension.

== Track listings and formats ==
- US seven-inch and cassette single
1. "Rain" (radio remix) – 4:35
2. "Waiting" (album version) – 5:45
- US and Canadian CD maxi-single
1. "Rain" (radio remix) – 4:35
2. "Waiting" (remix featuring Everlast) – 4:41
3. "Up Down Suite" – 12:13
4. "Rain" (album version) – 5:24
- US twelve-inch vinyl; Australian and Canadian cassette single
1. "Rain" (radio remix) – 4:33
2. "Rain" (album version) – 5:24
3. "Up Down Suite" – 12:13
4. "Waiting" (remix featuring Everlast) – 4:41
- UK twelve-inch vinyl, twelve-inch picture disc, and CD single
1. "Rain" (radio remix) – 4:35
2. "Open Your Heart" (album version) – 4:13
3. "Up Down Suite" – 12:13
- German twelve-inch maxi-single
1. "Rain" (album edit) – 4:17
2. "Rain" (remix edit) – 4:33
3. "Fever" (edit one) – 4:03
4. "Fever" (edit two) – 4:27
- Japanese and Australian EP
1. "Rain" (radio remix) – 4:35
2. "Waiting" (remix featuring Everlast) – 4:41
3. "Up Down Suite" – 12:13
4. "Rain" (album version) – 5:24
5. "Bad Girl" (extended mix) – 6:29
6. "Fever" (extended 12-inch) – 6:08
7. "Fever" (Shep's Remedy Dub) – 4:29
8. "Fever" (Murk Boys Miami Mix) – 7:10
9. "Fever" (Oscar G's Dope Dub) – 4:53
10. "Rain" (video edit) – 4:32
- Digital single (2022)
1. "Rain" (radio remix) – 4:35
2. "Waiting" (remix featuring Everlast) – 4:41
3. "Rain" (radio remix edit) – 4:20
4. "Up Down Suite" – 12:13
5. "Rain" (video edit) – 4:33
6. "Fever" (edit two) – 4:27

== Credits and personnel ==
Credits are adapted from the Erotica album liner notes.

- Madonna – songwriter, producer, vocals
- Shep Pettibone – songwriter, producer, sequencing, programming, keyboard
- Robin Hancock – recording engineer
- P. Dennis Mitchell – recording engineer
- Tony Shimkin – drum programming
- Goh Hotoda – mixing engineer

== Charts ==
=== Weekly charts ===
1993 weekly chart performance for "Rain"
Chart (1993)	Peak position
Australia (ARIA)	5
Austria (Ö3 Austria Top 40)	24
Belgium (Ultratop 50 Flanders)	25
Brazil (UPI)	4
Canada Retail Singles (The Record)	1
Canada Top Singles (RPM)	2
Canada Adult Contemporary (RPM)	7
Europe (Eurochart Hot 100)	15
Europe (European Hit Radio)	4
Finland (Suomen virallinen lista)	5
Germany (GfK)	26
Iceland (Íslenski Listinn Topp 40)	25
Ireland (IRMA)	7
Israel (Israeli Singles Chart)	3
Italy (Musica e dischi)	9
Netherlands (Dutch Top 40)	36
Netherlands (Single Top 100)	38
New Zealand (Recorded Music NZ)	20
Sweden (Sverigetopplistan)	16
Switzerland (Schweizer Hitparade)	11
UK Singles (Official Charts)	7
UK Airplay (Music Week)	3
US Billboard Hot 100	14
US Adult Contemporary (Billboard)	7
US Dance Singles Sales (Billboard)	13
US Pop Airplay (Billboard)	7
US Rhythmic Airplay (Billboard)	38
US Cash Box Top 100	21

2022 weekly chart performance for "Rain"
Chart (2022)	Peak position
UK Singles Downloads (Official Charts)	71

=== Year-end charts ===
Year-end chart performance for "Rain"
Chart (1993)	Position
Australia (ARIA)	39
Canada Top Singles (RPM)	15
Canada Adult Contemporary (RPM)	44
Europe (Eurochart Hot 100)	96
Europe (European Hit Radio)	25
Israel (Israeli Singles Chart)	21
Sweden (Topplistan)	49
UK Singles (Official Charts)	79
US Billboard Hot 100	67
US Adult Contemporary (Billboard)	38

== Certifications and sales ==
Certifications and sales for "Rain"
Region	Certification	Certified units/sales
Australia (ARIA)	Gold	35,000^{^}
United Kingdom	—	130,771
^{^} Shipments figures based on certification alone.

== Literary sources ==
- Bego, Mark (2000). Madonna: Blonde Ambition. Cooper Square Press. ISBN 978-0-8154-1051-5.
- Bernard, James; Marsh, Dave (1994). The New Book of Rock Lists. Touchstone. ISBN 978-0-671-78700-4.
- Easlea, Daryl (2012). Madonna: Blond Ambition. Backbeat Books. ISBN 978-1-61713-034-2.
- Fouz-Hernández, Santiago; Jarman-Ivens, Freya (2004). Madonna's Drowned Worlds. Ashgate Publishing, Ltd. ISBN 978-0-7546-3371-6.
- Gabriel, Mary (2023). Madonna: A Rebel Life. Hachette UK. ISBN 978-0-316-45644-9.
- Gavin, James (2014). Is That All There Is? The Strange Life of Peggy Lee. Atria Books. ISBN 978-1-4516-4168-4.
- Guilbert, Georges-Claude (2002). Madonna as Postmodern Myth. McFarland. ISBN 978-0-7864-1408-6.
- Kung, Kaby Wing-Sze (2020). Reconceptualizing the Digital Humanities in Asia: New Representations of Art, History and Culture. Springer Nature Singapore. ISBN 978-981-15-4642-6.
- O'Brien, Lucy (2007). Madonna: Like an Icon. Bantam Press. ISBN 978-0-593-05547-2.
- Rettenmund, Matthew (1995). Encyclopedia Madonnica. St. Martin's Press. ISBN 978-0-312-11782-5.
- Rooksby, Rikky (2004). The Complete Guide to the Music of Madonna. Omnibus Press. ISBN 978-0-7119-9883-4.
- Ryan, Gavin (2011). Australia's Music Charts 1988–2010 (doc). Mt. Martha, VIC, Australia: Moonlight Publishing.
- Sullivan, Caroline (2014). Madonna: Her Story. Seven Oaks Publishing. ISBN 978-1-78177-179-2.
- Vernallis, Carol (2004). Experiencing Music Video: Aesthetics and Cultural Context. Columbia University Press. ISBN 978-0-231-11798-2.
