= Alex Magno (choreographer) =

Brazilian choreographer and director

Alexandre Magno is a Brazilian choreographer and director. He has choreographed productions for Madonna, including The Girlie Show and Drowned World Tour. His work on the televised Drowned World Tour earned him a shared nomination for the Primetime Emmy Award for Outstanding Choreography in 2002.

== Early life ==
Magno grew up in Vila Kennedy near Rio de Janeiro. He trained in capoeira and karate and began choreographing as a teenager for a dance group he formed called Old Jazz. After winning a choreographers' competition in Brazil in 1986, he travelled to Los Angeles and received a scholarship to train at the Dupree Dance Academy.

== Choreography ==
=== 1993 - 2006 ===
Magno choreographed Madonna's 1993 Girlie Show tour and its HBO concert special, Madonna Live Down Under: The Girlie Show. Reviewing the broadcast for Variety, Dominic Griffin praised its choreography alongside the music and vocal performances.

Magno, Debra Brown and Jamie King received a 2002 Primetime Emmy Award nomination for Outstanding Choreography for the HBO concert special Madonna Live: The Drowned World Tour.

Following Madonna's tour, Magno began working for the male pop group Plus One on their 2002 Obvious tour.

In 2002, Magno graduated from the New York Film Academy.

In 2003, Britney Spears asked Magno to choreograph for her ABC special and MTV club tour, for which his work was highly praised in Us Weekly.

In 2004, Magno was commissioned by the Norwegian company ODE choreograph their 10th anniversary show, to be titled Illusionatics.

In December 2005, Magno worked with flamenco guitarist Ron Benise, choreographing and staging Nights Of Fire a PBS television special, which incorporated flamenco, Afro-Cuban salsa, and samba. Magno then worked on Benise's 2006 National Tour; re-mounting, choreographing in addition to dancing as one of the lead performers with Benise.

Magno appeared in, directed and choreographed The Eternal a short film written by Zalman King, for the Bravo television network, which aired as part of the Forty Duce series. He also choreographed for the show So You Think You Can Dance, on Fox, as one of the shows first guest choreographers.

Magno choreographed the video for the songSway by the Pussycat Dolls, from the soundtrack to the 2004 film Shall We Dance?.

In 2005, Ballet Hispanico premiered Magno's Orfeu in the Carnaval of Souls at the Joyce Theater in New York. Reviewing the production for The Villager, Sara G. Levin described it as a Brazilian adaptation of the Orpheus myth and praised its combination of jazz, African-influenced movement and Latin samba.

Magno produced original music for his ballets Rendezvous Liaison, Dejame Sonar and Orfeu In The Carnaval Of Souls.

He has been a dance trainer for Christina Applegate, Elizabeth Berkley, and Jennifer Lopez.

=== 2008 - present ===
Magno collaborated with Yanni as artistic director and choreographer for Televisa, and for Yanni's 2008 PBS television special Yanni Voices, which featured the artists Natahan Pacheco, Chloe, Ender Thomas, Leslie Mills, José José, Lucero, Christian Castro, Olga Tañon and an orchestra. This special was nominated for a Luna Award in Mexico.

By 2011, Magno was directing, choreographing and producing Benise's The Spanish Guitar world tour.

He is producer, co-writer and choreographer of Winds of Passion, a series of three short films linked into one drama feature film.

Magno created for the Norwegian dance company ODE La Rueda, a Latin/Cuban ballet, with both established and new Latin artists, using Latin songs such as Celia Cruz's single "La Vida Es Un Carnaval".

== Theater ==
In 1989, Magno formed his own dance company, Personna Dance Theater. He produced a five show series With Passion. In 1998, he and his company were the featured company for Joinville, the dance festival in South America, where he received a special award for excellence in choreography.

In 1996, Magno was hired to choreograph, write, and compose Hiroshima Requiem, a dance concert commemorating the 50th anniversary of the bombing of Hiroshima in the Second World War.

He was later the director and choreographer and composer for the Parisian Lido Show Rendezvous Liaison, an original ballet for their upcoming world tour.

For the Ballet Hispanico in New York City, he created an original ballet based on Hispanic music of the 1940s and 1950s, Dejame Sonar.

In 2003, Magno was commissioned to create original works for Odyssey dance company, based on the mythic story of Euridice; an original ballet based on Shakespeare’s Othello for Origins Company combining Latin ballroom, jazz, and hip-hop; and a piece for the European company ODE.

He also choreographed for Franz Ferdinand Master of Illusion tour, the Hair 20th anniversary, Jfoxx and Jmen, and Love vs. Hate; A Romeo and Juliet Story.

== Feature films and television ==
- 62nd Academy Awards, which he co-choreographed with Paula Abdul
- In Living Color, a television series in which he directed a dance segment
- Lord of Illusions a Clive Barker film
- Somebody to Love, starring Rosie Perez
- Liquid Dreams, for which his choreography was favorably reviewed at the 1991 Cannes Film Festival
- Brasil 500 Anos, a celebration of Brazil’s 500th birthday
- The Golden Eagle Awards for Nosostro TV
- Just a Dream, a video for MCA recording artist Donna De Lory
