= The Girlie Show: Live Down Under =

Video by Madonna
- Released: April 26, 1994
- Recorded: November 19, 1993
- Venue: Sydney Cricket Ground
- Length: 117 mins
- Label: Warner-Reprise Video; Maverick; Sire
- Director: Mark "Aldo" Miceli
- Producer: Marty Callner

Madonna video chronology
Blond Ambition World Tour Live (1990)	The Girlie Show: Live Down Under (1994)	The Video Collection 93:99 (1999)

The Girlie Show: Live Down Under is a video album by American singer-songwriter Madonna. It was released by Warner-Reprise Video, Maverick and Sire Records on April 26, 1994, on VHS and Laserdisc formats and included the concert that took place on November 19, 1993, at Sydney Cricket Ground from The Girlie Show. The concert had previously been broadcast on American network HBO as Madonna Live Down Under: The Girlie Show and became the channel's most-watched original program of the year. The video received generally positive reviews from music critics, and reached numbers one and three in the music videos charts in the United Kingdom and the United States, respectively. At the 37th Grammy Awards, it was nominated for Best Long Form Music Video. It was released on DVD in 1998, becoming one of the first music videos to be published in this format.

== Background ==
The Girlie Show was Madonna's fourth concert tour. It supported her fifth studio album Erotica, and was seen as an attempt to revive her musical career after the album and her film Body of Evidence impressed neither critics nor audiences. The tour received generally positive reviews from critics and reportedly grossed US$70 million ($152.37 million in 2024 dollars) from 39 concerts. It was subject of controversy in several countries it visited due to its sexual imagery; in Israel, Orthodox Jews staged protests to force the cancellation of the concert. However, rallies were unsuccessful as the show went on as scheduled. During the concert in Puerto Rico, she caused further controversy by rubbing the country's official flag between her legs, resulting in about 30 Puerto Ricans protesting against the singer outside her house in Miami, asking for a boycott of Madonna's music until she apologized.

Initially, Madonna intended to film the tour in Argentina or Mexico, but she ultimately chose Australia instead, as she liked the event being billed as "Madonna Down Under". The show on November 19, 1993, at Sydney Cricket Ground was aired on HBO on November 21, 1993, as Madonna Live Down Under: The Girlie Show. HBO started its broadcast from Club USA in New York City, leading to the concert itself. The program became the company's most-watched original program of the year. The video was released on VHS and Laserdisc on April 26, 1994, under the title The Girlie Show: Live Down Under. In 1998, it was released on DVD, becoming one of the first video albums to be published in this format. The music video appears in an aspect ratio of 1.33:1 (4:3) on the single-sided, single-layered DVD, featuring "bright and vivid" colors. In addition to this release, the concerts in Fukuoka were filmed for a Japanese television special, while British radio station BBC Radio 1 broadcast the entire second show at Wembley Stadium on December 26, 1993.

== Reception ==
=== Critical reception ===
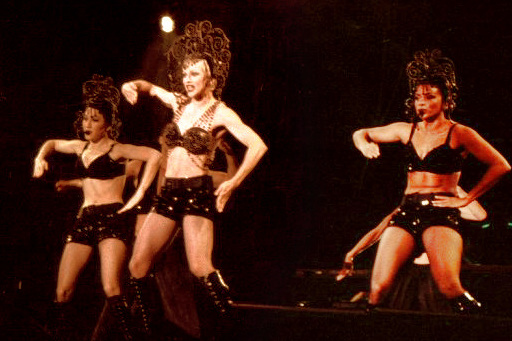
Madonna's performance of "Vogue" on the tour was deemed "eye-popping" by Billboard's Catherine Applefield.

The video received generally positive reviews from music critics. The Hollywood Reporter deemed it a "showcase not only for the superstar's prodigious talents as a singer and dancer, but also for her ability to orchestrate and film an appropriately mammoth production". The New Yorker praised the release for being "great entertainment" and highlighted the singer's stage presence as "a wonder of our times". Dominic Griffin, from Variety, praised the way the video was shot, and wrote that the show "never once let up", highlighting Madonna's "great energy and amazing stamina throughout". Heather Phares from AllMusic gave the release four out of five stars. Although she criticized the lack of additional features, she praised the video, sound and the "dynamic" performances; she concluded it was a "decent presentation of a spectacular, two-hour concert, and worthwhile for fans looking to upgrade from the laser disc or VHS versions".

Billboard's Catherine Applefield called it a "revue-style-concert-cum-fashion show that parades itself in grand fashion" which "occasionally degenerates into a silly, sexpot exercise". She said it was a release that "fans will proudly purchase". In a more negative review, Jeff Gordiner from Entertainment Weekly wrote that the video "is the point where shock turns to schlock", and criticized the singer's "goosestep precision", which he felt made the concert "as sexy as a swig of Pepto-Bismol". For Richard Cromelin from the Los Angeles Times, "Mark Miceli's direction seemed to be winging it, alternating between spectacle and intimacy. [...] Instead of conveying the magic, it documented the labor, and failed to unify [Madonna's] succession of personas into a coherent whole". At the 37th Annual Grammy Awards, it was nominated for Best Long Form Music Video, but lost to U2's Zoo TV: Live from Sydney.

=== Commercial performance ===
In the United States, The Girlie Show: Live Down Under debuted at number three on Billboard's music videos chart, on the issue dated May 14, 1994. It received a gold certification by the Recording Industry Association of America (RIAA). In the United Kingdom, the release debuted at the top of the music videos chart, on the week dated May 1, 1994. It was eventually certified platinum by the British Phonographic Industry (BPI), for shipments of more than 50,000 copies. Additionally, it was certified gold in Brazil, and three times platinum in Australia.

== Track listing ==
No.	Title	Writer(s)	Length
1.	"The Girlie Show Theme"	Jai Winding	2:25
2.	"Erotica"	Madonna; Shep Pettibone	4:10
3.	"Fever"	John Davenport; Eddie Cooley	4:48
4.	"Vogue"	Madonna; S. Pettibone	5:29
5.	"Rain"	Madonna; S. Pettibone	9:51
6.	"Express Yourself"	Madonna; Stephen Bray	5:16
7.	"Deeper and Deeper"	Madonna; S. Pettibone; Anthony Shimkin	7:27
8.	"Why's It So Hard"	Madonna; S. Pettibone; A. Shimkin	5:00
9.	"In This Life"	Madonna; S. Pettibone	6:44
10.	"The Beast Within"	Lenny Kravitz; Ingrid Chavez; Madonna	5:42
11.	"Like a Virgin"	Tom Kelly; Billy Steinberg	6:04
12.	"Bye Bye Baby"	Madonna; S. Pettibone; A. Shimkin	4:15
13.	"I'm Going Bananas"	Michael Kernan; Andy Paley	1:44
14.	"La Isla Bonita"	Madonna; Patrick Leonard; Bruce Gaitsch	5:10
15.	"Holiday"	Curtis Hudson; Lisa Stevens	12:32
16.	"Justify My Love"	L. Kravitz; I. Chavez; Madonna	8:05
17.	"Everybody Is a Star" / "Everybody"	Sylvester Stewart / Madonna	12:08
18.	"Credits"		3:12

Notes

- "Rain" contains an excerpt from "Just My Imagination (Running Away with Me)" and "Singin' in the Rain".
- "Like a Virgin" contains an excerpt from "Falling in Love Again (Can't Help It)".
- "Holiday" contains an excerpt from "Holiday for Calliope".
- "Everybody Is a Star" / "Everybody" contains an excerpt from "Dance to the Music" and "After the Dance".

== Credits and personnel ==
- Mark "Aldo" Miceli – director
- Marty Callner – producer
- Toby Phillips – cinematography
- Jay Torres – film editing
- Christopher Ciccone – production design
- Jeffrey Hornaday – stage producer
- Michelle Johnston – choreography
- Alex Magno – choreography
- Keith Young – choreography

Credits per the notes of The Girlie Show: Live Down Under.

== Charts ==
=== Weekly charts ===
Chart (1994)	Peak position
UK Music Videos (OCC)	1
US Top Music Videos (Billboard)	3
US Top Laserdisc Sales (Billboard)	12
US Top Video Sales (Billboard)	7

Chart (2004–2006)	Peak position
Greek Music DVD (IFPI Greece)	6
Hungarian Music DVD (Mahasz)	11
Portuguese Music DVD (AFP)	14
Spanish Music DVD (PROMUSICAE)	8
UK Independent Albums (OCC) The Girlie Show Live - Japan Broadcast	38

=== Year-end charts ===
Chart (1994)	Peak position
US Top Music Videos (Billboard)	31
US Top Video Sales (Billboard)	32

== Certifications ==
Region	Certification	Certified units/sales
Argentina (CAPIF) Video album	Platinum	8,000^{^}
Argentina (CAPIF) DVD-5 edition	Platinum	8,000^{^}
Australia (ARIA)	3× Platinum	45,000^{^}
Brazil (Pro-Música Brasil)	Gold	25,000^{*}
United Kingdom (BPI)	Platinum	50,000^{^}
United States (RIAA)	Gold	50,000^{^}
^{*} Sales figures based on certification alone.^{^} Shipments figures based on certification alone.
