= U.N.V. (group) =

R&B group

- Origin: Lansing, Michigan, United States
- Genres: R&B
- Years active: 1991–present
- Label: Maverick Records (1993-1995)
- Members: John Powe; Shawn Powe; John Clay; Demetrius Peete

U.N.V. (or Universal Nubian Voices) was an R&B group based out of Lansing, Michigan. The group consisted of brothers John Powe and Shawn Powe, and members John Clay and Demetrius Peete. They are best known for their 1993 summer hit single, "Something's Goin' On".

== History ==
U.N.V. or, Universal Nubian Voices, was a male quartet that came onto the scene in 1993 out of Lansing, Michigan with their debut album, Something's Goin On. The group was composed of brothers John Powe and Shawn Powe, and members John Clay and Demetrius Peete.

U.N.V. actually had its start in two separate groups, when Shawn created a group called 2.N.V. and John Powe created a group called U.N.V. with the idea of "You envy." John's group saw success as he went to college and came to include all four members. It wasn't until after they had the name U.N.V. that Shawn gave the abbreviation its meaning of "Universal Nubian Voices".

The group's debut album, Something's Goin On was released first as an independent record and received a lot of airplay in Detroit on radio station WJLB. The group sold 10,000 copies of the album's title track, attracting the attention of Madonna's label, Maverick Records. Signed to the label, the album received a nationwide release and the title track became a hit in August 1993, reaching #29 on the Hot 100 and #3 on the R&B charts. The album's second single, "Straight from My Heart" came out at the height of the group's popularity but was unable to latch on the success of Something's Goin On. As such, the song peaked out at #36 on the R&B charts. The group had some radio play from DJ Steve Edwards on BBC Radio 1 in 1993 but failed to chart in the UK.

In 1995, U.N.V. released their sophomore effort, the self-titled Universal Nubian Voices. The album had moderate success with its first single, "So in Love with You" peaking out at #49 on the R&B charts. However, despite decent early sales of the album, the group failed to chart another single and the album quickly faded out. Throughout the album's production, the group was in conflict with Maverick over the direction of the album. Maverick took greater creative control on the record, bringing in more big name producers. As a result of the disagreements, the group left Maverick following the album's release.

After leaving Maverick, John Powe began working as an independent artist under the name J. Poww. The other members of the group went their separate ways as well, and nothing was heard from U.N.V. In 2008, the group reunited and released an album titled Timeless which features the group's biggest hits, as well as a collection of new tracks. Group member John Powe also has a solo album, titled The Headliner, marked for release on Valentine's Day 2009.

John Powe later reformed the group and recast U.N.V. as U.N.V. II. U.N.V. II included Terry Thomas, Byron "Suge" McClendon, and Jeff "JAS" Stuart. In December 2016, the group released the album Kings of the Quiet Storm.

== Members ==
Original members

- John "J.POWW" Powe
- Shawn Martin
- John "JC" Clay
- Demetrius Peete

U.N.V. II members

- John "J.POWW" Powe
- Terry Thomas
- Byron "Suge" McClendon
- Jeff "JAS" Stuart

== Discography ==
=== Studio albums ===
| Year | Title | Label | US R&B Chart | US Top 200 |
|---|---|---|---|---|
| 1993 | Something's Goin' On | Maverick Records | 7 | 59 |
| 1995 | Universal Nubian Voices | Maverick Records | 39 | 161 |
| 2008 | Timeless | Maverick Records | | |

=== Singles ===
| Year | Title | Chart positions | | | Album |
| Year | Title | Billboard Hot 100 | US Hot Hip-Hop & R&B Singles | New Zealand | Album |
|---|---|---|---|---|---|
| 1993 | "Something's Goin' On" | 29 | 3 | — | Something's Goin' On |
| 1993 | "Straight from My Heart" | — | 36 | — | Something's Goin' On |
| 1994 | "Close Tonight" | — | 87 | — | Something's Goin' On |
| 1995 | "So in Love with You" | 65 | 49 | 3 | Universal Nubian Voices |
