= Erotica (song) =

1992 single by Madonna

Single by Madonna

from the album Erotica
- Released: September 29, 1992
- Recorded: June 8, 1992
- Studio: Soundworks (New York)
- Genre: Pop; hip hop; dance-pop
- Length: 5:20 (album version); 4:32 (radio edit)
- Label: Maverick; Sire; Warner Bros.
- Songwriters: Madonna; Shep Pettibone; Anthony Shimkin
- Producers: Madonna; Shep Pettibone

Madonna singles chronology
"This Used to Be My Playground" (1992)	"Erotica" (1992)	"Deeper and Deeper" (1992)

Music video
- "Erotica" on YouTube

"Erotica" is a song by American singer Madonna from her fifth studio album of the same name (1992). Madonna and Pettibone produced the song; they wrote it with Anthony Shimkin. Maverick, Sire, and Warner Bros. Records released it on September 29, 1992, as Erotica's lead single. The song continued Madonna's exploration of spoken word vocals, which she had introduced in "Justify My Love" (1990). "Erotica" is a pop hip-hop and dance song with Middle Eastern influences whose lyrics talk about sadomasochism; the singer uses the alter ego Dita and invites her lover to be submissive while she has sex with him.

Music critics deemed "Erotica" dark, experimental, and sexy. Others considered it derivative of "Justify My Love". Retrospective reviews refer to it as one of Madonna's best songs. Its debut on the US Billboard Hot 100 at number 13 was one of the highest ever at the time; it peaked at number three. It topped the charts in Finland, Hungary, Italy and Greece, as well as the US Dance Club Play chart. It peaked in the top 10 of several countries, including the United Kingdom, Australia, Denmark, and Portugal.

Directed by Fabien Baron, the music video features scenes of Madonna dressed as a masked dominatrix interspersed with footage of the making of her Sex book; it is combined with appearances by Naomi Campbell and Isabella Rossellini, among others. The video was highly controversial, being aired by MTV only three times, all after the 10pm watershed, before being completely banned. Madonna has included "Erotica" on four of her concert tours, the most recent being the Celebration Tour of 2023—2024. It was also included on Madonna's compilations, GHV2 (2001), and Celebration (2009), and has been covered and parodied by several artists, including Julie Brown and Sandra Bernhard.

== Background and development ==
In 1992, Madonna founded her own multi-media entertainment company Maverick, consisting of a record company (Maverick Records), a film production company (Maverick Films), and associated music publishing, television broadcasting, book publishing, and merchandising divisions. The first two projects from the venture were her fifth studio album Erotica and a coffee table book of photographs featuring Madonna, entitled Sex. For Erotica, Madonna primarily collaborated with American producer Shep Pettibone; Pettibone first began working with the singer during the 1980s, providing remixes for several of her singles. Pettibone would build the base music of the songs in a style similar to his remixes, while Madonna wrote the melodies and lyrics. According to the producer in an article titled "Erotica Diaries", published on Madonna's Icon magazine, he created a tape of three tracks for Madonna to listen to; he traveled to Chicago, where she was filming A League of Their Own (1992), played the songs for her and she liked all of them. In October 1991, Madonna met with Pettibone in New York City to start working on demos. According to Mark Bego, the first batch of songs they worked on were "Erotica", "Deeper and Deeper", "Bad Girl", "Thief of Hearts", and "Rain". Anthony Shimkin, who also worked on the album, recalled that Madonna had with her a "book full of lyrics and melody ideas".

At first, the singer did not like the songs she had recorded. She wanted Erotica to have a raw edge, as if it were recorded in an alley in Harlem, and not a light glossy production, according to Pettibone. In the case of the title track, the producer revealed that it underwent "numerous radical changes" during the recording process, with four different versions being recorded; Madonna would first sing it one way, and then decide to erase everything and start all over again. Shimkin affirmed that the original version was not "as slinky and sexy and grimy and dirty", until the mixing process; at that stage, the song was still an "experimentation", but when they realized it was going to be the lead single from the album, a "different, darker vibe" was taken on. While recording Erotica, Madonna was also working on Sex; for the book, she incorporated a dominatrix alter-ego named Mistress Dita, heavily inspired by German actress Dita Parlo. To accompany the book, Madonna had recorded a song titled "Erotic", described by Pettibone as an "ode to S&M". However, after actually seeing the book, Pettibone suggested that the singer incorporate the dominatrix theme into the song's lyrics: "'You have all these great stories [in the book]', I told her, 'Why don't you use them in the song?'" Madonna left the studio with a copy of Sex with her, came back and recorded her vocals to "Erotica" in a "very dry" way; Pettibone then realized the song "would never be the same again". The chorus and bridge were changed entirely and the song's "psyche" became "sexier, more to the point".

== Composition and release ==
"Erotica" was written by Madonna, Pettibone and Shimkin, and produced by Madonna and Pettibone. Recording took place at Astoria's Sound Work Studios on June 8, 1992; personnel working on the song included Pettibone on the sequencing, keyboard arrangement, and programming, alongside Shimkin and Joe Moskowitz; Dennis Mitchell and Robin Hancock worked as recording engineers, while George Karras was the mixing engineer. The track continued Madonna's exploration of potent spoken-word vocals, which she had previously introduced in her 1990 single "Justify My Love". It samples Kool and the Gang's "Jungle Boogie" (1973), and "El Yom 'Ulliqa 'Ala Khashaba" by Lebanese singer Fairuz. The former sample was Pettibone's idea, as he felt it gave the song a "dark, mysterious" vibe, while the Fairuz sample caused controversy after she stated her vocals had been used without her consent, and said the lyrics He was crucified today, sung in Arabic, were taken from a religious song that is traditionally heard during Good Friday services. This led to a lawsuit that was settled out of court; however, both the single and the album were banned in Lebanon.

"Erotica"
31-second audio sample of "Erotica", in which Madonna "purrs" the lines Give it up, do what I say/ Give it up and let me have my way

Musically, "Erotica" has been described as a pop hip-hop dance song with "scratchy, trip-hop loops" and Middle Eastern influences. According to the sheet music published by Alfred Publishing Inc., "Erotica" is set in common time with a moderate tempo of 120 beats per minute; composed in the key of F-sharp minor, Madonna's vocals span from F♯_{3} to A_{4}. It follows a chord progression of D/F♯–F♯m–D/F♯–F♯m in the introductory verses. Lyrically, it talks about S&M and begins with a "put-a-record-on scratchiness" sound that mimics a record player; 40 seconds in, the "Jungle Boogie" sample plays in a "disembodied and eerie" way. Madonna invites her lover to be submissive while she has sex with him, and suggests that he explore boundaries between pain and pleasure, demanding: Give it up, do what I say/ Give it up and let me have my way. The song features "taunting, aggressive" sexually suggestive lyrics, such as, Will you let yourself go wild/Let my mouth go where it wants to, and Put your hands all over my body during the refrain. Also present are maracas and "shimmying horn riff[s]". "Erotic", the version recorded for Sex, described as "more hardcore" by academic Georges-Claude Guilbert, includes lyrics not heard in the final version, such as We could use the cage/I've got a lot of rope/I'm not full of rage, I'm full of hope/This is not a crime and you're not on trial/Bend over baby, I'm going to make you smile.

In Australia and most European countries, "Erotica" was released as the album's lead single on September 29, 1992. In the United States, the planned release date was September 30, but five days prior, several radio stations were already playing the song. According to Billboard, on September 25, Don Stevens from CFTR Toronto had obtained a copy of the single and played it at 10:30 a.m., before getting a cease and desist by Warner Bros. Stevens then accused the label of leaking the single to "benefit from the accompanying publicity", which was denied by Warner Music Canada VP Kim Cooke. In Los Angeles, both KIIS-FM and Power 106 played the song once, but stopped at "the request" of the label. Open House Party aired the single at night on September 26 and 27, via 150 affiliates. "Erotica" was officially released in the US on October 13, 1992. The single was included on Madonna's compilation albums GHV2 (2001) and Celebration (2009), while a remixed form can be found on Finally Enough Love: 50 Number Ones (2022). In 2022, 30 years after the release of the single and album, Madonna officially released the cancelled 3-tracks vinyl picture disc. This features the famous “toe sucking” photo featured on the front.

== Critical reception ==
Upon release, "Erotica" was generally well received by music critics. For Billboard, Larry Flick referred to it as a "sensual slice of aural sex" that "twists the vibe of 'Justify My Love'", and highlighted the "deep and complex" arrangement. From the same magazine, Joe Lynch named the song a "bold sonic departure" for the singer. Writing for AllMusic, Jose F. Promis classified it as one of the "darkest, most sinister, and most interesting" singles in her catalog. Rolling Stone's Arion Berger wrote that, unlike "Justify My Love", which gathered its "heat from privacy and romance", "[The Madonna of] 'Erotica' is in no way interested in your dreams [...] [the song] demands the passivity of a listener, not a sexual partner". Berger concluded his review by referring to "Erotica" as "insistently self-absorbed — 'Vogue' with a dirty mouth, where all the real action’s on the dance floor". Slant Magazine's Sal Cinquemani deemed it "brilliant". J. Randy Taraborrelli, author of Madonna: An Intimate Biography, pointed out that "['Erotica'] wasn't a surprise for anyone who had been paying attention to [Madonna's] recent music. She had shown her hand earlier with Breathless when she sang 'Hanky Panky', the song about spanking [...] then there was her single 'Justify My Love' [...] 'Erotica' though, was the full-blown music exploration, an exhibition, of what we were to believe was Madonna's sexual reality." The New York Times' Stephen Holden praised the singer's "foggy growl [that] contrasts dramatically with the shrill little-kid voice from [her] earliest records". For Gavin Martin from The Seattle Times, the singer's voice "sounds as though it's coming from somewhere dark and menacing: as far as you can tell it sounds like a man".

"['Erotica'] has an aural allure all its own, setting your dirtiest fantasies to a grimy groove. Going from sultry spoken word in the verses to a postcoital purr in the chorus, it’s the sound of sex — and sleaze — with Madonna introducing herself as Mistress Dita long before there was a Madame X. Hinting at the sonic adventurism that was to come on Ray of Light, it was about the boldest move she could have made at the height of her career".

— Chuck Arnold commenting on the song on Billboard's review of the Erotica album on its 30th anniversary.

Allen Metz and Carol Benson, authors of The Madonna Companion: Two Decades of Commentary, said the track was "a bondage update on 'Justify My Love'". Similarly, while reviewing GHV2, Cinquemani called it a sequel to "Justify My Love", that is "as distantly icy as it was erotic", and a "creative high for a career on the verge of public turmoil". At Blender, Tony Powers considered the song one of the album's standout tracks. In less favorable comments, Anthony Violanti from The Buffalo News said the track was the album's weakest, and dismissed it as a "carbon copy" of "Justify My Love". Cashbox's Randy Clark said that, musically, the single did not offer anything new, and called it a "melody-less 'Vogue'". Charlotte Robinson of PopMatters was also negative on her review; she felt the song did not age well, and referred to it as a "cold, dispassionate sexual fantasy" with "adolescent" lyrics intended to shock. Jude Rogers, writing for The Guardian, opined "Erotica" is an "oddly sexless Sex-era single, not helped by awkward synthesised sighs". Finally, Entertainment Weekly's David Browne panned it as "depressingly trite [...] between its frigid melody and your scary 'My name is Dita' spoken bits, it’s about as sexy as an episode of the Shelley Hack-era Charlie's Angels".

Retrospective reviews have been positive. In 2011, Slant Magazine placed the song at number 34 on their list of "The 100 Best Singles of the 1990s"; Ed Gonzalez praised Madonna's "throaty" vocals for making the song's "taunting, aggressive lyrics —an elaborate exploration of sex, from seduction to disease— feel unmistakably honest". Matthew Jacobs from HuffPost placed the song at number 23 of his ranking of Madonna's singles, calling it a "a period of innovation for the singer". On Gay Star News' ranking, the single came in at number 17; Joe Morgan called it "daring, sexy, and unabashed". Entertainment Weekly's Chuck Arnold considered "Erotica" Madonna's 10th greatest song, and PinkNews' Nayer Missim her sixth; the former opined it was "the boldest move she could have made at the height of her career", while the latter said the song was among the "most carefree, unpretentiously sexy music ever released". Arnold also pointed out that with "Erotica", the singer "introduced the pop-diva alter ego: Before Mariah gave us Mimi and Beyoncé gave us Sasha Fierce, [Madonna] gave us the dominatrix Dita". This opinion was shared by Louis Virtel, writing for The Backlot, who named the song Madonna's eight best, and a "hot, smutty grind of a dance anthem".

Morgan Troper, for Portland Mercury, named "Erotica" an example of "scary-sexy" Madonna, and one of her "five sexiest songs that aren't 'Like a Virgin'". Scott Kearnan from Boston.com wrote that, "No pop star of her fame has been this sexually transgressive before or since [...] Rihanna sings about 'S&M' like it’s a song about My Little Pony, but [Madonna] dishes on pain, pleasure, and power with the conviction of a whip crack"; he named "Erotica" the singer's sixth best. The song came in the 22nd position of Billboard magazine's list of Madonna's singles, with Lynch hailing it "the boldest, riskiest reinvention in a career full of them [...] An icy declaration that it was time to kick open the doors on kinks and own them without shame". El Hunt from NME wrote: "Defined by sleazy Shep Pettibone beats, orgasmic gasps, and choice lyrics [...] ['Erotica'] makes 50 Shades of Grey look tamer than a fully-domesticated alpaca". From the Official Charts Company, Justin Myers considered the Sex version of "Erotic" to be one of Madonna's "hidden gems".

== Commercial performance ==
On October 17, 1992, "Erotica" debuted at number 13 on the Billboard Hot 100, tying with Mariah Carey's "I'll Be There" as the highest-debuting single in the chart since 1970. One week later, the single peaked at number three behind Boyz II Men's "End of the Road", and "Sometimes Love Just Ain't Enough" by Patty Smyth and Don Henley. "Erotica" was the first song to reach the Hot 100's top three in just two weeks since Michael Jackson's "Black or White", released in November 1991; nonetheless, it was also Madonna's first lead single to not top the chart since 1983. By October 31, 1992, sales took a dip and the single dropped two positions in the chart. Jose F. Promis pointed out that "Erotica" was one of the fastest-rising singles in the chart's history, but also had one of the biggest drops; he attributed this to a backlash the singer faced from the general public, who decided she had gone "too far" following the release of the Sex book. Overall, "Erotica" spent eighteen weeks on the chart, and received a gold certification by the Recording Industry Association of America (RIAA) on December 10, 1992, for shipment of 500,000 copies. The song also saw success on Billboard's Maxi-Singles Sales and Dance Club Play charts, reaching the first position of both; it became Madonna's 13th chart-topper on the latter chart. "Erotica" came in at number 48 on the Maxi-Singles Sales year-end chart for 1993. In March 2014, Billboard reported that the song held the record for the highest debut in the history of the Hot 100 Airplay chart, having entered at number two. In Canada, the single debuted in the 58th position of RPM's 100 Hit Tracks chart on the week of October 17; it peaked at number 13 the week of November 21, 1992.

In the United Kingdom, "Erotica" debuted at the 11th position of the UK Singles Chart on October 17, 1992, and, 2 weeks later, peaked at number 3; it spent 9 weeks on the chart overall. According to Music Week magazine, 270,800 copies of the single have been sold in the UK as of 2008. In Australia, "Erotica" entered the ARIA Singles Chart at number 16 on the week of October 25, 1992, eventually peaking at 4 and lasting 11 weeks on the chart. The Australian Recording Industry Association (ARIA) certified it Gold for shipments of over 35,000 copies in Australia. In New Zealand, the song debuted at number eight the week of November 1, 1992 and, a week later, reached its peak of number three. "Erotica" saw success across Europe as well; it reached the top three in Norway, Portugal, and Sweden. It topped the charts of Finland, Greece and Italy, and reached the top 10 in Belgium, Denmark, Ireland, the Netherlands, and Spain. The single was less successful in Austria and France, peaking at numbers 15 and 23, respectively. "Erotica" reached the first position of both the Eurochart Hot 100 and the European Dance Radio Chart.

== Music video ==
=== Background and broadcast ===
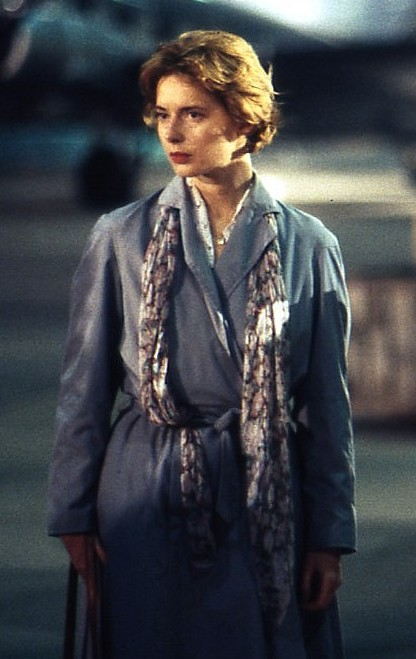
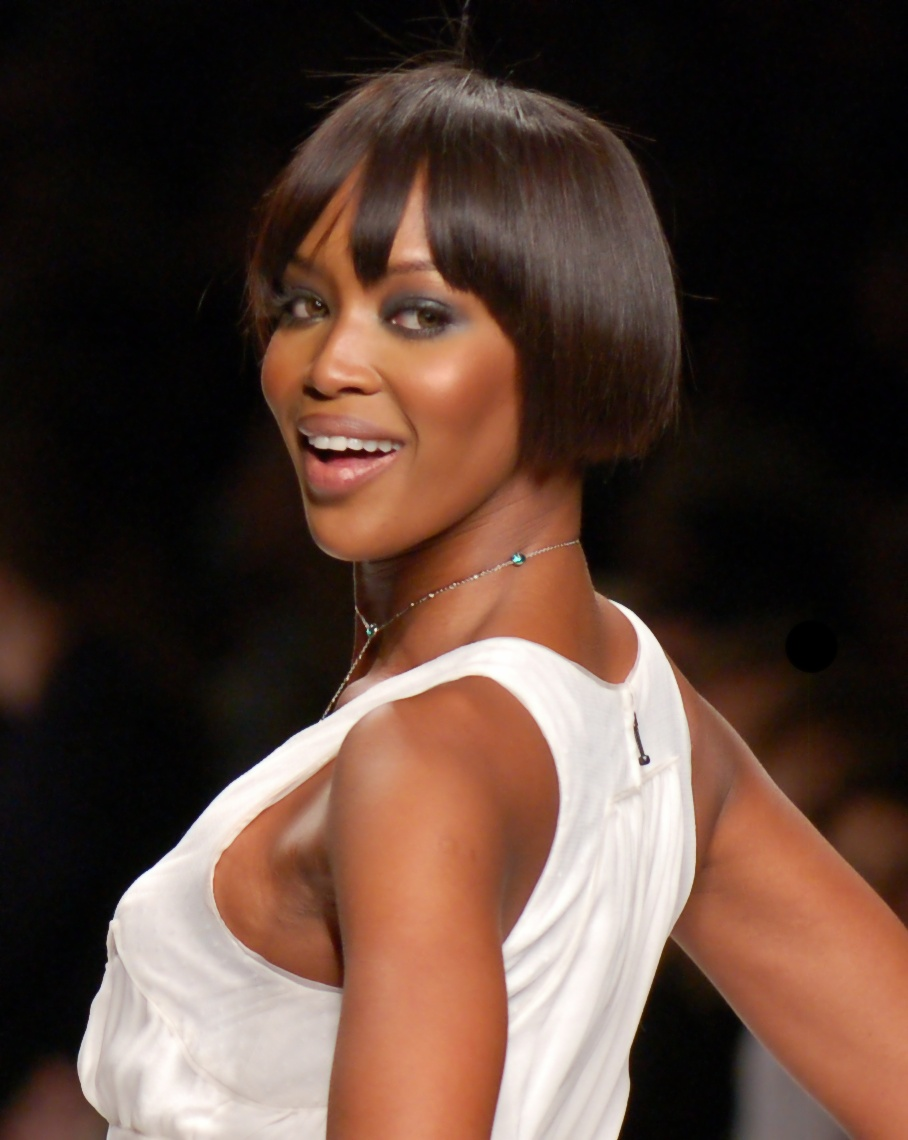
Models Isabella Rossellini (left) and Naomi Campbell (right) are among the celebrities that appeared in the "Erotica" music video alongside Madonna.

The music video for "Erotica" was shot in August 1992 and directed by fashion photographer Fabien Baron. The video consisted mostly of Super 8 film shot by Baron during Steven Meisel's photo sessions for the book Sex. Billboard's Deborah Russell had previously reported that the singer would shoot two videos for the single: an X-rated one, that would be released as a commercial single, and a G-rated version for broadcast. Madonna later explained that she visualized the clip by closing her eyes and thinking of what was erotic to her, though not necessarily having experienced such things. Inspired by the films of Andy Warhol and The Factory, and Kenneth Anger's 1947 short film Fireworks, the video intercalates scenes of Madonna dressed as a masked dominatrix with a gold tooth, with actual footage of the making of the Sex book; in these scenes, the singer is seen sitting topless in the lap of an older man, kissing model Naomi Campbell, wearing BDSM gear, and riding a bicycle in the nude. Vanilla Ice, Big Daddy Kane, and Isabella Rossellini all make appearances. The scenes of Madonna as a dominatrix were shot in New York's The Kitchen, while shootings for Sex took place at Hotel Chelsea and Times Square's all-male burlesque Gaiety Theatre. Richard Harrington from The Washington Post gave a description of the visual:

"In the video, [Madonna] becomes Dita Parlo, a masked, gold-toothed dominatrix from an indeterminate age, ready to help us cross the street at the corner of Pleasure and Pain [...] assuming different dominatrix roles and investigating assorted bondage scenarios before finishing up with some nude hitchhiking on a street remarkable free of pile-ups. Shot in grainy black and white, 'Erotica' has the feel of a stag film, though its quick cuts keep the viewer from seeing all that much".

The video had its world premiere on MTV, on midnight October 2, 1992; following a "mercifully short" lecture on BDSM, host Kurt Loder explained that because some people may find the video's content "repellent", it would only be shown at night and not in regular rotation. "Erotica" was shown a total of three times on MTV, all three after midnight, before being completely retired from airing; it became Madonna's second video to be banned by the channel, following "Justify My Love". MTV spokesperson Carole Robinson said that the video would never air in its entirety during days or evenings, but selected parts would air on afternoon dance show The Grind; also from the channel, Linda Alexander explained that the video's themes were "clearly aimed at a more adult audience", lacking appropriateness for the general public. Madonna herself said she understood the channel's ban, as "[MTV] plays to a huge audience and a lot of them are children, and a lot of themes I'm exploring in my videos aren't meant for children, so I understand that they say I can't show it".

Other networks such as NBC and the Times Square screens also refused to air the visual after finding its content "too racy"; Pearl Liebermen, a producer of NBC's Friday Night Videos, found "Erotica" to be "very stimulating", and said that although the network would not air the video, they would report on it. One of the few networks that aired the video was The Box, where it became the number-one music video; the channel's president Vincent Monsey found the clip to be "very well-produced" and did not see any problem with it. On October 19, 1992, MTV began airing the video on its entirety again after midnight, this time with a disclaimer warning viewers of the sexually explicit themes. "Erotica" can be found on Madonna's 2009 compilation Celebration: The Video Collection.

=== Reception and analysis ===
Still of the "Erotica" music video, showing a naked Madonna hitchhiking in Miami, Florida. This image can also be found in the singer's book, Sex.

Initial reaction to the music video ranged from mixed to negative. Rolling Stone's Anthony DeCurtis noted it was "pretty much normal Madonna fare", but wondered how much longer would she be able to "continue mining sexuality", concluding: "At what point does it just stop being interesting?" Similarly, Michele Romero, writing for Entertainment Weekly, asked, "Haven’t we seen most of this stuff before? Can we be bored with the subject matter already?", and gave the clip a B− rating; Romero furthered criticized the "choppy editing" and the lack of emotion that makes it "difficult to identify with or care about" the video's characters. She concluded her review by deeming the video a "litany of television taboos [rather] than a titillating expression of her sexual fantasies". Anthony Violanti panned it as a "musical and visual dud" that's "about as sexy as Ross Perot". "['Erotica' is] another example of her video overkill [...] [Madonna] has hyped sex to the point of boredom and has become a caricature of herself", Violanti wrote. For Matthew Rettenmund, author of Encyclopedia Madonnica, it is her "most emotionally stark" video, further adding: "[She] looks as evil and daunting as your worst nightmare, or your most sinister fantasy. [...] If Madonna has ever done a video that is truly disturbing, this is it".

In a more positive review, former pornographic actress Candida Royalle applauded the singer for "helping women find equal footing in society" by presenting the subject of erotica and "unconventional sexual behavior". Retrospective reviews towards the visual have been similarly positive; Parade's Samuel Murrian named it Madonna's 20th best music video. Virtel and Idolator's Mike Nied both considered "Erotica" to be Madonna's 17th best video; the former deemed it a "seedy sight, but one that forces you to wonder: Would you let yourself go wild?", while according to the latter, the visual "brought soft porn to the mainstream". For MTV's Kyle Anderson, "[the video] still feels controversial all these years". "Erotica" was considered one of Madonna's most controversial music videos by Cinquemani and HuffPost's Daniel Welsh. At the 1993 Billie Awards, "Erotica" was nominated in three categories: Consumer print, trade print (music) and consumer print (retail), the most for a single entry; it was also included on VH1's 50 Sexiest Video Moments at number 16. Rolling Stone's Eric Harvey named "Erotica" one of "The 15 Most NSFW Music Videos of All Time". Finally, for Eric Henderson from Slant Magazine, "Erotica" is Madonna's 15th greatest music video.

In Justify My Love: Sex, Subversion, and Music Video (2019), Ryann Donnelly wrote that the music video "expands and proliferates" the queer imagery from "Justify My Love"; this can be seen in scenes where Madonna kisses and gropes Campbell and Rossellini, two "classic objects of desire for heterosexual men", according to Donnelly. The author also went on to explain how the singer generates "shock and sexual arousal" by exposing sexual activities usually kept hidden from heteronormativity: drag, bondage, roleplay, homosexuality, and group sex; "[Madonna] unveils honest facets of sexuality, rarely seen in mainstream media [...] [She] elevates and legitimizes these truths and fantasies through her extreme visibility and success".

== Live performances ==
"Erotica" has been included on four of Madonna's concert tours: The Girlie Show (1993), Confessions (2006), MDNA (2012), and Celebration (2023–2024). On the first one, it was performed as opening number, beginning with a topless dancer sliding down a pole dangling high above the stage. Then, Madonna emerged dressed as a short-haired dominatrix, wearing a domino mask, sequined black hotpants and bra, long gloves, knee-high boots, and brandishing a riding crop. She rubbed the crop between her legs as she sang, while dancers posed and danced suggestively in the background. On his review of the concert in New York's Madison Square Garden, Jon Pareles from The New York Times pointed out that, "[during] the ethereal Put your hands all over my body in 'Erotica', [the choreography] suggests exercises rather than unbridled passion". The performance recorded on November 19, 1993, at the Sydney Cricket Ground, was included on The Girlie Show: Live Down Under home video release (1994).

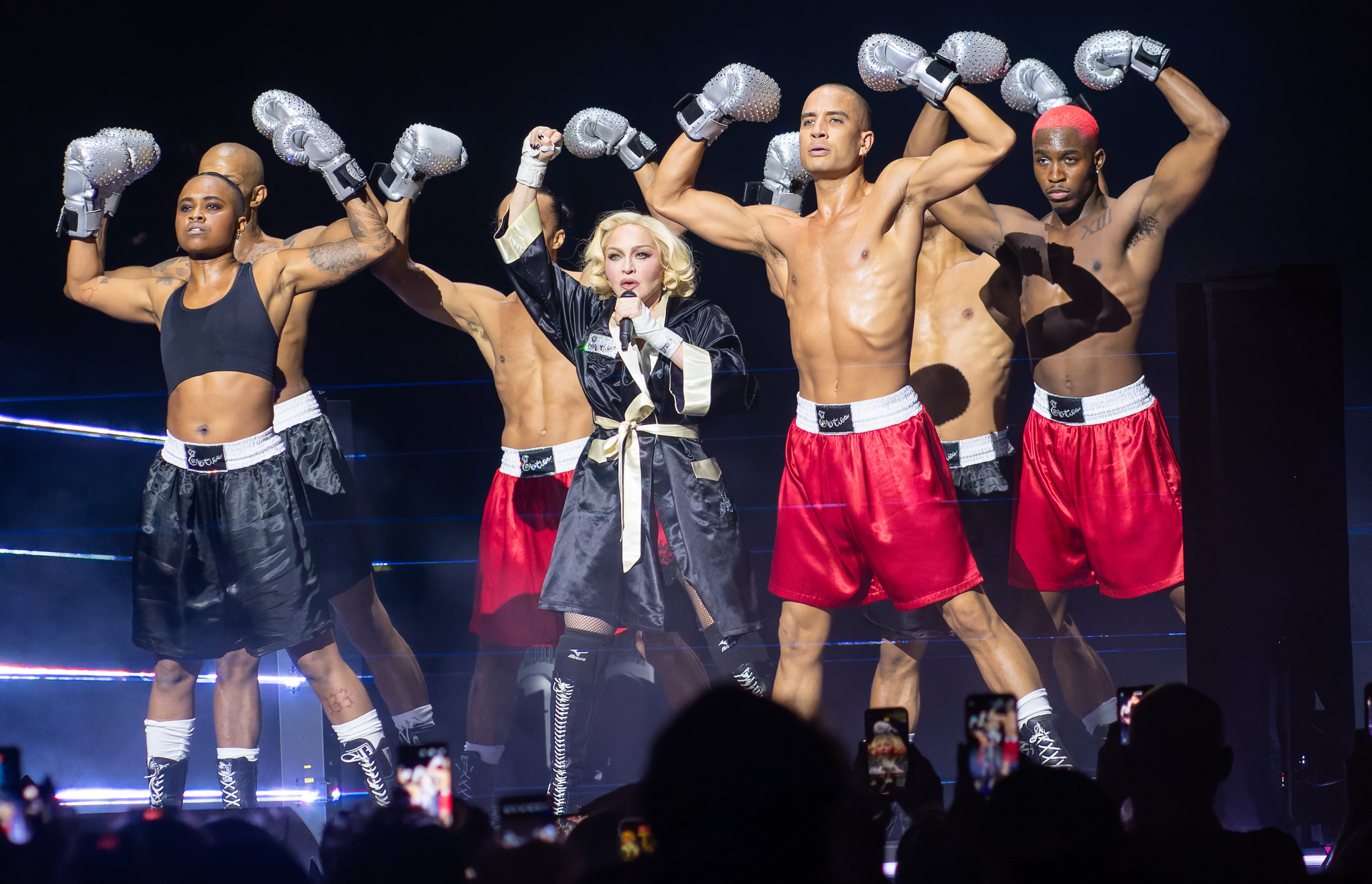
The Celebration Tour's boxing-themed performance of "Erotica" in 2023

For 2006's Confessions Tour, "Erotica" was used on an introduction video that led to "Music" (2000), along with "Borderline" (1984), "Dress You Up" (1985), and "Holiday" (1983). On that same tour, Madonna sang a remix of the song, based on one of the unreleased demos known as "You Thrill Me". She wore a one-shouldered unitard with ribbons of purple Swarovski crystals across the torso, similar to the one worn by the singers of ABBA, designed by Jean Paul Gaultier, and was joined by five couples dancing "mild-mannered steps lifted from a Broadway ballroom scene". Slant Magazine's Ed Gonzalez opined that, "her performance of Stuart Price's 'You Thrill Me' remix of 'Erotica' is a smash: She disco-fies the song but keeps its sex appeal, choreographing it to simple, Latin-infused dance maneuvers that are ecstatic". The performance from the August 15–16 London concerts was included on the singer's second live album The Confessions Tour (2007).

"The Erotic Candy Shop", a medley of "Erotica" and "Candy Shop"―from Hard Candy (2008)―was included on the MDNA Tour of 2012. Madonna sang as a male dancer groped her. The Jerusalem Post's Niv Elis highlighted the performance, which he felt showcased the singer "at her visual best"; on the contrary, Emrah Güler from the Hürriyet Daily News said it was one number that "could have been left out". The performances at the November 19–20 shows in Miami were recorded and released in the MDNA World Tour live album (2013).

Four 2023–2024's the Celebration Tour, "Erotica" was given a boxing theme. The stage had a ring crafted from lasers, while Madonna―who donned a slip dress underneath a boxing robe―cavorted around shirtless dancers wearing glittery gloves. The performance ended with the singer masturbating on a red velvet bed, flanked by a dancer dressed in the Jean Paul Gaultier-designed gold corset from 1990's Blond Ambition World Tour. From the BBC News, Mark Savage saw the number as "a reminder of her tumultuous relationships", as the backdrop screens depicted Madonna's then-boyfriend, boxing coach Josh Popper.

== Other versions and usage in media ==
The Sex book, the single and its music video, have been parodied several times: in the October 1992 edition of Paper, actress Ann Magnuson said she was going to release a Sex book to accompany her album, Neurotica; "Neurotica" was also the name used to spoof the song and its video on the Fox sketch comedy series In Living Color. In The Edge, also from Fox, Julie Brown―who had previously parodied Madonna's 1991 film Truth or Dare―played the singer discussing Sex on a talk show, and did a spoof of the "Erotica" video; when Sandra Bernhard brought her stand-up show Giving Til It Hurts to New York, she did a short spoof of the song, also called "Neurotica", about a woman who obsessively cleans her house. The Village Voice columnist Michael Musto recreated the nude hitchhiking scene from the Sex book and the "Erotica" music video on the streets of Jersey City; the newspaper sold the posters of the photo for $5-profits, which went to New York's Community Research Initiative on AIDS.

Covers by Pornoland and Razed in Black were included in the 2000 tribute albums Virgin Voices 2000: A Tribute To Madonna, and The Material Girl: A Tribute to Madonna, respectively. Of the latter, AllMusic's Al Campbell said it was one of the album's "more attention-grabbing cuts". In 2005, a cover by Adam Marano was recorded for Tribute to Madonna (Golden Sound); three years later, "Erotica" was covered by Clueless and The Sunset Lounge. "Erotica" was featured in a scene of Madonna's directorial debut Filth and Wisdom (2008).

== Track listing and formats ==
- US 7-inch and cassette single; Japanese 3-inch CD single
1. "Erotica" (album version) – 5:17
2. "Erotica" (instrumental) – 5:17
- UK and European 7-inch and cassette single
1. "Erotica" (radio edit) – 4:32
2. "Erotica" (instrumental) – 5:17
- US CD maxi-single; Japanese CD EP; Digital single (2020)
1. "Erotica" (radio edit) – 4:32
2. "Erotica" (Kenlou B-Boy mix) – 6:27
3. "Erotica" (William Orbit 12-inch) – 6:12
4. "Erotica" (Underground Club mix) – 4:57
5. "Erotica" (Masters at Work dub) – 4:57
6. "Erotica" (Jeep Beats) – 5:53
7. "Erotica" (Madonna's in My Jeep mix) – 5:50
- UK 12-inch vinyl and 12-inch picture disc; European 12-inch vinyl and CD single
1. "Erotica" (album version) – 5:17
2. "Erotica" (instrumental) – 5:12
3. "Erotica" (radio edit) – 4:33
- US cassette maxi-single
1. "Erotica" (Kenlou B-Boy mix) – 6:23
2. "Erotica" (Jeep Beats) – 5:48
3. "Erotica" (Madonna's in My Jeep mix) – 5:46
4. "Erotica" (William Orbit 12-inch) – 6:07
5. "Erotica" (Underground club mix) – 4:53
6. "Erotica" (Bass Hit dub) – 4:47
- European CD maxi-single
1. "Erotica" (William Orbit 12-inch) – 6:07
2. "Erotica" (Kenlou B-Boy mix) – 6:25
3. "Erotica" (Underground club mix) – 4:53
4. "Erotica" (William Orbit dub) – 4:53
5. "Erotica" (Madonna's in My Jeep mix) – 5:46

== Credits and personnel ==
Credits are adapted from the album's liner notes.

- Madonna – lead vocals, songwriter, producer
- Shep Pettibone – songwriter, producer, sequencing, keyboard, programming
- Anthony Shimkin – songwriter, sequencing, keyboards, programming
- Joe Moskowitz – keyboard
- Dennis Mitchell – recording engineer
- Robin Hancock – recording engineer
- George Karras – mixing engineer

== Charts ==
=== Weekly charts ===
Weekly chart performance for "Erotica"
Chart (1992–1993)	Peak position
Australia (ARIA)	4
Austria (Ö3 Austria Top 40)	15
Belgium (Ultratop 50 Flanders)	8
Canada Top Singles (RPM)	13
Canada Retail Singles (The Record)	2
Canada Contemporary Hit Radio (The Record)	2
Denmark (IFPI)	6
Ecuador (UPI)	1
Europe (Eurochart Hot 100)	1
Europe (European Dance Radio)	1
Europe (European Hit Radio)	1
Finland (Suomen virallinen lista)	1
France (SNEP)	23
Germany (GfK)	13
Greece (IFPI)	1
Iceland (RÚV)	14
Ireland (IRMA)	4
Italy (Musica e dischi)	1
Japan (Oricon Singles Chart)	74
Netherlands (Dutch Top 40)	8
Netherlands (Single Top 100)	10
New Zealand (Recorded Music NZ)	3
Norway (VG-lista)	2
Portugal (AFP)	2
Spain (AFYVE)	4
Sweden (Sverigetopplistan)	3
Switzerland (Schweizer Hitparade)	8
UK Singles (Official Charts)	3
UK (MRIB)	2
UK Airplay (Music Week)	3
UK Dance (Music Week) US-import remixes	58
UK Club Chart (Music Week)	95
US Billboard Hot 100	3
US Bubbling Under R&B/Hip-Hop Songs (Billboard)	16
US Dance Club Songs (Billboard)	1
US Dance Singles Sales (Billboard)	1
US Pop Airplay (Billboard)	9
US Rhythmic Airplay (Billboard)	5
US Cash Box Top 100	3

2022 weekly chart performance for "Erotica"
Chart (2022)	Peak position
Hungary (Single Top 40)	1
UK Singles Sales (OCC)	5
UK Vinyl Singles (OCC)	1

Weekly chart performance for "Erotica"
Chart (2026)	Peak position
UK Singles Sales (OCC)	81
UK Vinyl Singles (OCC)	8

=== Year-end charts ===
1992 year-end chart performance for "Erotica"
Chart (1992)	Position
Australia (ARIA)	54
Belgium (Ultratop 50 Flanders)	90
Europe (Eurochart Hot 100)	45
Europe (European Dance Radio)	12
Europe (European Hit Radio)	39
Netherlands (Dutch Top 40)	95
Sweden (Topplistan)	50
UK Singles (OCC)	67

1993 year-end chart performance for "Erotica"
Chart (1993)	Position
US Maxi-Singles Sales (Billboard)	48

2022 year-end chart performance for "Erotica"
Chart (2022)	Position
Hungary (Single Top 40)	85
UK Vinyl Singles (OCC)	10

== Certifications and sales ==
Certifications and sales for "Erotica"
Region	Certification	Certified units/sales
Australia (ARIA)	Gold	35,000^{^}
United Kingdom	—	270,800
United States (RIAA)	Gold	500,000^{^}
^{^} Shipments figures based on certification alone.

== Bibliography ==
- Bego, Mark (2000). Madonna: Blonde Ambition. Cooper Square Press. ISBN 978-0-8154-1051-5.
- Borzillo-Vrenna, Carrie (2008). Cherry Bomb: The Ultimate Guide to Becoming a Better Flirt, a Tougher Chick, and a Hotter Girlfriend―and to Living Life Like a Rock Star. Simon & Schuster. ISBN 978-1416961161.
- Burgess, Richard James (2013). The Art of Music Production: The Theory and Practice. Oxford University Press. ISBN 978-0-19-992172-0.
- Donnelly, Ryann (2019). Justify My Love: Sex, Subversion, and Music Video. Watkins Publishing. ISBN 978-1-912248-41-4.
- Falconi, Francesco (2017). Mad for Madonna: La Regina del Pop. Babelcube Inc. ISBN 978-1-5071-7795-2.
- Guilbert, Georges-Claude (2002). Madonna as Postmodern Myth. McFarland. ISBN 0-7864-1408-1.
- Ichbiah, Daniel (2016). Les Chansons de Madonna. CreateSpace. ISBN 978-1-5010-2479-5.
- Lenig, Stuart (2010). The Twisted Tale of Glam Rock. Praeger. ISBN 978-0-313-37986-4.
- Lough, James (2013). This Ain't No Holiday Inn: Down and Out at the Chelsea Hotel 1980–1995. Schaffner Press. ISBN 978-1-936182-52-7.
- Metz, Allen; Benson, Carol (1999). The Madonna Companion: Two Decades of Commentary. Music Sales Group. ISBN 978-0-8256-7194-4.
- Rettenmund, Matthew (1995). Encyclopedia Madonnica. St. Martin's Press. ISBN 0-312-11782-5.
- Ryan, Gavin (2011). Australia's Music Charts 1988–2010. Mt. Martha, VIC, Australia: Moonlight Publishing.
- Taraborrelli, Randy J. (2008). Madonna: An Intimate Biography. Simon & Schuster. ISBN 978-0-330-45446-9.
