= List of 1990s films based on actual events =

This is an index of lists of films and miniseries released in the 1990s that are based on actual events.

- List of 1990 films based on actual events
- List of 1991 films based on actual events
- List of 1992 films based on actual events
- List of 1993 films based on actual events
- List of 1994 films based on actual events
- List of 1995 films based on actual events
- List of 1996 films based on actual events
- List of 1997 films based on actual events
- List of 1998 films based on actual events
- List of 1999 films based on actual events
