= List of 1991 films based on actual events =

This is a list of films and miniseries released in 1991 that are based on actual events. All films on this list are from American production unless indicated otherwise.

== 1991 ==
- 29th Street (1991) – comedy drama film based on the true-life story of actor Frank Pesce, who won the first New York State Lottery in 1976
- A Triumph of the Heart: The Ricky Bell Story (1991) – biographical drama television film recounting the life of Ricky Bell, a Tampa Bay Buccaneers running back sickened with dermatomyositis, and Ryan Blankenship, a physically impaired child
- A Woman Named Jackie (1991) – biographical drama miniseries chronicling the life of Jacqueline Kennedy Onassis
- Absolute Strangers (1991) – biographical drama television film based on the true story of a husband's controversial decision to have his wife undergo an abortion to aid her recovery after a head-trauma accident had left her comatose
- American Friends (1991) – British romantic drama film based on a real-life incident involving Michael Palin's great-grandfather, Edward Palin
- And the Sea Will Tell (1991) – crime drama television film recounting an apparent double murder on Palmyra Atoll although only one body was ever found; the subsequent arrest, trial, and conviction of Wesley G. "Buck Duane" Walker; and the acquittal of his girlfriend, Stephanie Stearns, whom Bugliosi and Leonard Weinglass had defended
- Babe Ruth (1991) – biographical sport drama television film based on the life of Babe Ruth
- The Best Intentions (Swedish: Den goda viljan) (1991) – Swedish biographical drama film telling the story of the complex relationship between Ingmar Bergman's parents, Erik Bergman and Karin Åkerblom
- The Best of Friends (1991) – biographical television film about the friendship of George Bernard Shaw, Sydney Cockerell and Dame Laurentia McLachlan, based on the lengthy correspondence that passed between them for over 25 years
- Billy Bathgate (1991) – biographical gangster film about a teen named Billy Bathgate who finds first love while becoming the protégé of fledgling gangster Dutch Schultz
- Bix (1991) – Italian biographical drama film about the final years of cornet player Bix Beiderbecke
- Black Robe (1991) – historical drama film depicting the adventures of a Jesuit missionary tasked with founding a mission in New France
- The Boys from St. Petri (Danish: Drengene fra Sankt Petri) (1991) – Danish war drama film inspired by the activities of the Churchill Club
- Bugsy (1991) – biographical crime drama film based on the life of American mobster Bugsy Siegel and his relationship with wife and starlet Virginia Hill
- Cabeza de Vaca (1991) – Mexican adventure drama film about the adventures of Álvar Núñez Cabeza de Vaca, an early Spanish explorer, as he traversed what later became the American South
- Center Stage (Cantonese: 阮玲玉) (1991) – Hong Kong biographical drama film following the life and career of silent film actress Ruan Lingyu
- Charuga (Croatian: Čaruga) (1991) – Yugoslav biographical adventure film telling the true story about legendary Slavonian bandit Jovo Stanisavljević Čaruga
- The Chase (1991) – crime drama television film based on the true story of American criminal Phillip Hutchinson, who robbed a bank, killed a police officer, and took a man hostage in a 1988 rampage in Denver, Colorado
- Chernobyl: The Final Warning (1991) – disaster drama television film telling the true story about the tragic nuclear power plant accident in Chernobyl and how one American specialist, Dr. Robert Gale, helped the soviet doctors treat the survivors
- Conspiracy of Silence (1991) – Canadian crime drama miniseries based on the true story of the Murder of Helen Betty Osborne, a Canadian cold case that was legally resolved after roughly twenty years of inaction
- Cry in the Wild: The Taking of Peggy Ann (1991) – crime drama television film based on the true story of the abduction of Peggy Ann Bradnick by an ex-convict and ex-mental patient William Diller Hollenbaugh which took place in Shade Gap, Pennsylvania on 11 May 1966
- Deadly Intentions... Again? (1991) – thriller television film based on the true story of a troubled young doctor jailed for plotting the murder of his first wife
- Deadly Medicine (1991) – thriller drama television film chronicling the murder case of convicted serial killer Genene Jones, a pediatric nurse from San Antonio, Texas, who murdered between 11 and 46 infants during 1981 and 1982 by inducing Code blue emergencies through fatal overdoses of prescription medications such as heparin
- Death Song Korean: 사의 찬미) (1991) – South Korean biographical drama film about the life and death of famous Korean singer, Yun Sim-deok in the 1920s
- Decisive Engagement: The Liaoxi-Shenyang Campaign (Mandarin: 大決戰之遼沈戰役) (1991) – Chinese epic war film about the Liaoshen Campaign of the Chinese Civil War
- Dillinger (1991) – action crime television film based on the actual events of the pursuit of American bank robber John Dillinger during the 1930s
- The Doctor (1991) – drama film about a doctor who undergoes a transformation in his views about life, illness and human relationships, loosely based on Dr. Edward Rosenbaum's 1988 memoir A Taste of my Own Medicine
- The Doors (1991) – biographical drama film telling the story of the American rock band the Doors and their influence on music and counterculture
- False Arrest (1991) – drama television film based on the real-life murders of William Redmond and Helen Phelps and the true story of Joyce Lukezic, who was wrongfully convicted of being one of the masterminds behind the murders
- Fire: Trapped on the 37th Floor (1991) – disaster drama television film about the high-rise fire at the First Interstate Tower (now Aon Center) in Los Angeles, California
- The Haunted (1991) – horror drama television film depicting the events surrounding the Smurl haunting
- Hear My Song (1991) – British comedy drama film based on the story of Irish tenor Josef Locke
- Il Capitano: A Swedish Requiem (Swedish: Il Capitano) (1991) – Swedish-Finnish biographical drama film about the 1988 Åmsele murders in which a family of three was murdered by Juha Valjakkala over a stolen bicycle
- Impromptu (1991) – historical drama film about the romantic relationship between Frédéric Chopin and Amantine Dupin
- In a Child's Name (1991) – biographical thriller drama miniseries depicting a true story about a woman who fights her brother-in-law's parents for custody of her deceased sister's baby upon learning that her brother-in-law murdered her sister
- In Broad Daylight (1991) – thriller drama television film about the life of Ken McElroy, the town bully of Skidmore, Missouri who became known for his unsolved murder
- The Inner Circle (1991) – biographical crime drama film telling the story of Joseph Stalin's private projectionist and KGB officer Ivan Sanchin between 1939 and 1953, the year Stalin died
- Isabelle Eberhardt (1991) – Australian-French biographical drama film following the adult life of Isabelle Eberhardt
- Jacquot de Nantes (1991) – French biographical drama film recreating the early life of Agnès Varda's husband, Jacques Demy, in Occupied France and his interest in the various crafts associated with film making, such as casting, set design, animation and lighting
- JFK (1991) – epic political thriller film examining the investigation into the assassination of John F. Kennedy by New Orleans district attorney Jim Garrison, who came to believe there was a conspiracy to assassinate Kennedy and that Lee Harvey Oswald did not act alone
- The Josephine Baker Story (1991) – biographical drama television film about Josephine Baker, who was an international African-American star, who was especially successful in Europe
- Let Him Have It (1991) – British crime drama film based on the true story of Derek Bentley, who was convicted of the murder of a police officer by joint enterprise and was hanged in 1953 under controversial circumstances
- Line of Fire: The Morris Dees Story (1991) – drama television film based on the true story of Morris Dees, a civil rights lawyer from Alabama, whose Southern Poverty Law Center battles neo-Nazis and the Ku Klux Klan
- The Longest Night (Spanish: La noche más larga) (1991) – Spanish historical drama film concerning the last executions carried out by the Francoist dictatorship on 27 September 1975
- Love, Lies and Murder (1991) – crime drama miniseries based on the 1985 murder of Linda Bailey Brown
- Lovers (Spanish: Amantes) (1991) – Spanish neo-noir drama film telling the story of Paco, a young man who finds himself in Madrid in search of a job after leaving the army, based on a true story and set in 1950s Spain
- Lucy & Desi: Before the Laughter (1991) – biographical historical drama television film about the lives of Lucille Ball and Desi Arnaz
- Milena (1991) – French biographical drama film about Czech writer Milena Jesenská
- Mobsters (1991) – crime drama film detailing the creation of The Commission
- Murder in New Hampshire: The Pamela Wojas Smart Story (1991) – crime drama television film based on the true story of Pamela Smart seducing one of her 15-year-old students into sex and to murdering her husband, Gregg Smart, in Derry, New Hampshire
- My Best Friend, General Vasili, Son of Joseph Stalin (Russian: Мой лучший друг генерал Василий, сын Иосифа) (1991) – Soviet-Belgian biographical drama film based on a true story of a sport star Vsevolod Bobrov, who happened to become befriended by Vasily Stalin, the son of Joseph Stalin
- Nelligan (1991) – Canadian biographical drama film about Quebec poet Émile Nelligan
- Never Forget (1991) – historical drama television film telling the story of Mel Mermelstein, an American holocaust survivor who confronted a Holocaust denial organization's lies in court
- Not Without My Daughter (1991) – thriller drama film depicting the escape of American citizen Betty Mahmoody and her daughter from her abusive husband in Iran
- One Man's War (1991) – British drama television film based on the true story of Joel Filártiga, who sought justice for his son's death at the hands of Alfredo Stroessner's secret police
- The Ox (Swedish: Oxen) (1991) – Swedish drama film based on a true story of devastating hardship during the great Swedish drought of the late 1860s
- The Pistol: The Birth of a Legend (1991) – biographical sport drama film about the 1959 8th grade basketball season of Pete Maravich, presenting his early beginnings and the origin of the "Pistol" nickname
- Prisoner of Honor (1991) – British biographical drama television film centering on the famous Dreyfus Affair
- Rose Against the Odds (1991) – Australian biographical sport drama miniseries chronicling the life of Australian Aboriginal boxer Lionel Rose
- Rossini! Rossini! (1991) – Italian biographical drama film depicting real life events of composer Gioachino Rossini
- Selling Hitler (1991) – comedy drama miniseries about the Hitler Diaries hoax
- Son of the Morning Star (1991) – Western historical miniseries telling the story of George Custer, Crazy Horse and the events prior to the battle of the Little Bighorn, told from the different perspectives of two women
- Switched at Birth (1991) – drama miniseries based on the true story of Kimberly Mays and Arlena Twigg, babies switched soon after birth in a Florida hospital in 1978
- To Be Number One (Cantonese: 跛豪) (1991) – Hong Kong biographical gangster film based on the rise and fall of a real-life gangster Ng Sik-ho
- All the Mornings of the World (French: Tous les Matins du Monde) (1991) – French biographical drama film telling the story of Monsieur de Sainte-Colombe, grand master of the viola da gamba, and Marin Marais, prestigious musician in the court of Louis XIV
- Van Gogh (1991) – French biographical drama film following the last 67 days of Vincent van Gogh's life and explores his relationships with his brother Theo, his physician Paul Gachet (most famous as the subject of Van Gogh's painting Portrait of Dr. Gachet), and the women in his life, including Gachet's daughter, Marguerite
- Walerjan Wrobel's Homesickness (German: Das Heimweh des Walerjan Wróbel) (1991) – German historical drama film about Walerian Wróbel, a Polish forced laborer who was executed by the National Socialists at the age of only 17
- Walking a Tightrope (French: Les Équilibristes) (1991) – French drama film about a famous homosexual writer during the sixties in Paris who is trying to make a young Arab into the greatest tightrope walker in the world, allegedly based on a true story witnessed by the director Nikos Papatakis
- The White Viking (Icelandic: Hvíti víkingurinn) (1991) – Icelandic historical film set in Norway and Iceland during the reign of Olaf I of Norway, loosely following actual events
- Wife, Mother, Murderer (1991) – drama television film concerning Alabama murderer Marie Hilley
- Wild Hearts Can't Be Broken (1991) – romantic drama film concerning Sonora Webster Carver, a rider of diving horses
- Without Warning: The James Brady Story (1991) – drama television film focuses on James Brady, the press secretary to Ronald Reagan who was severely injured in an attempt on the president's life in 1981
- Young Catherine (1991) – British historical drama miniseries based on the early life of Catherine the Great, Empress of Russia
