= List of 1996 films based on actual events =

This is a list of films and miniseries released in 1996 that are based on actual events. All films on this list are from American production unless indicated otherwise.

== 1996 ==
- A Girl Called Rosemary (German: Das Mädchen Rosemarie) (1996) – German biographical crime drama television film based on the life of Rosemarie Nitribitt
- After Jimmy (1996) – drama television film based on a true story of a woman, with her family, mourning the suicide death of her teenage son
- Andersonville (1996) – historical war drama television film about a group of Union soldiers during the American Civil War who are captured by the Confederates and sent to an infamous Confederate prison camp, loosely based on the diary of John Ransom
- Apollo 11 (1996) – biographical drama television film about NASA's Apollo 11 mission which landed the first humans on the Moon
- Basquiat (1996) – biographical drama film based on the life of American postmodernist/neo expressionist artist Jean-Michel Basquiat
- Bastard Out of Carolina (1996) – drama film based on the semi-autobiographical novel of the same name by Dorothy Allison, examining the complexities of mother-child relationships, conditions of class, race, and sexuality
- Beaumarchais (French: Beaumarchais l'insolent) (1996) – French biographical drama film based on the life of the French playwright, financier and spy Pierre Beaumarchais, depicting his activities during the American War of Independence and his authorship of the Figaro trilogy of plays
- Breaking the Code (1996) – British biographical drama television film about British mathematician Alan Turing, linking Turing's cryptographic activities with his attempts to grapple with his homosexuality
- The Bruce (1996) – British historical drama film focusing primarily on the rise to power of Robert I of Scotland, culminating in the Battle of Bannockburn in AD 1314
- Color of a Brisk and Leaping Day (1996) – drama film about a Chinese-American's attempt at saving the Yosemite Valley Railroad in post-WWII California
- Crazy Horse (1996) – Western biographical drama television film based on the true story of Crazy Horse, a Native American war leader of the Oglala Lakota, and the Battle of Little Bighorn
- Crime of the Century (1996) – crime drama television film presenting a dramatization of the Lindbergh kidnapping of 1932
- The Crucible (1996) – historical drama film depicting a dramatized and partially fictionalized story of the Salem witch trials that took place in the Massachusetts Bay Colony during 1692–93
- Dead Heart (1996) – Australian mystery thriller film set in the isolated Outback, mainly Aboriginal town of Wala Wala, where an Aboriginal man is found dead in the local police lock up, based on the true story of an Aboriginal who killed someone in the 1930s for traditional reasons.
- Deadly Voyage (1996) – American-British survival drama television film about Kingsley Ofosu, the sole survivor of a group of nine African stowaways murdered on the Bahamian-flagged cargo ship MC Ruby in 1992
- Deep Crimson (Spanish: Profundo Carmesí) (1996) – Mexican crime drama film depicting a dramatization of the story of "Lonely Hearts Killers", Raymond Fernandez and Martha Beck, who committed a string of murders of women in the 1940s
- The Delicate Art of the Rifle (1996) – surrealistic comedy drama film about a school shooting as seen through the eyes of a socially awkward college student named Jay, the shooter is loosely based on Charles Whitman
- Devil's Island (Icelandic: Djöflaeyjan) (1996) – Icelandic comedy drama film depicting a group of otherwise homeless families living in barracks abandoned by the US Air Force after the Second World War
- The Disappearance of Garcia Lorca (1996) – American-Spanish-French-Cinema of Puerto Rican biographical drama film about the life and murder of Spanish poet Federico García Lorca
- Easy Prey (1996) – Canadian historical drama television film reenacting the true story of Australian serial killer Christopher Wilder, also known as "the Beauty Queen Killer", and his kidnapping of victim Tina Marie Risico, a sixteen-year-old girl
- Entertaining Angels: The Dorothy Day Story (1996) – biographical drama film about the life of Dorothy Day, the journalist turned social activist and founder of the Catholic Worker newspaper
- Eva Perón: The True Story (1996) – Argentine biographical drama film based on the life of Eva Perón
- Evita (1996) – musical historical drama film depicting the life of Eva Perón, detailing her beginnings, rise to fame, political career and death at the age of 33
- Fly Away Home (1996) – family adventure drama film dramatizing the actual experiences of Bill Lishman who, in 1986, started training Canada geese to follow his ultralight aircraft, and succeeded in leading their migration in 1993 through his program "Operation Migration"
- Flynn (1996) – Australian biographical drama film about the early life of Errol Flynn, focusing on his time in New Guinea
- For My Daughter's Honor (1996) – drama television film based on the true story of Brook Graham and her experience that started when she was a freshman in the fall of 1986 at Taylor High School in Taylor, Texas
- Forgotten Sins (1996) – drama television film based on Lawrence Wright's two-part article "Remembering Satan", about the real-life case of Paul Ingram, which appeared in the 17 and 24 May 1993, issues of The New Yorker
- The Ghost and the Darkness (1996) – historical adventure film depicting a fictionalized account of the Tsavo man-eaters, a pair of male lions that terrorized workers in and around Tsavo, Kenya during the building of the Uganda-Mombasa Railway in East Africa in 1898
- Ghosts of Mississippi (1996) – biographical courtroom drama film based on the 1994 trial of Byron De La Beckwith, a white supremacist accused of the 1963 assassination of civil rights activist Medgar Evers
- Giant Mine (1996) – Canadian disaster drama television film dramatizing the events of the 1992 Giant Mine labour dispute and the subsequent bomb explosion which killed nine replacement workers
- Gone in the Night (1996) – thriller drama television film about the Jaclyn Dowaliby murder case
- Gotti (1996) – crime drama television film about infamous Gambino crime family boss John Gotti
- Gray's Anatomy (1996) – American-British comedy drama film about Spalding Gray who is diagnosed with a rare ocular condition called macular pucker
- The Great War and the Shaping of the 20th Century (1996) – historical war drama miniseries dramatizing genuine testimonies of frontline soldiers during World War I
- Hamsun (1996) – Danish-German-Swedish-Norwegian biographical war drama film about the later life of the Norwegian author Knut Hamsun, who, together with his wife Marie Hamsun, went from being a national hero to a traitor after supporting Nazi Germany during their occupation of Norway during World War II
- Handel's Last Chance (1996) – Canadian-Slovak biographical drama television film following a fictionalized background of the premiere performance of George Frideric Handel's Messiah in 1742
- Hillsborough (1996) – British disaster drama television film depicting a dramatization of the Hillsborough disaster, which saw 97 football supporters lose their lives at Hillsborough in Sheffield
- Hollow Reed (1996) – British-German-Spanish romantic drama film following a divorced gay man who begins to suspect that his son is being physically abused by his ex-wife's new boyfriend, based on a true incident
- Hostile Advances (1996) – drama television film based on Ellison v. Brady, a landmark sexual harassment case
- I Shot Andy Warhol (1996) – biographical drama film about the life of Valerie Solanas and her relationship with the artist Andy Warhol
- In Cold Blood (1996) – crime drama miniseries about the 1959 murders of the Clutter family in Holcomb, Kansas
- In Love and War (1996) – romantic drama film based on writer Ernest Hemingway's real-life experiences in the First World War as a young ambulance-driver in Italy
- Infinity (1996) – biographical drama film telling the story of the early life of genius and Nobel Prize-winning physicist Richard Feynman
- Intimate Relations (1996) – Canadian-British comedy drama film based on the true story of Albert Goozee, who was put on trial in 1956 in England
- It's My Party (1996) – romantic drama film based on the true events of the death of Harry Stein, accomplished architect and designer, who was actually director Randal Kleiser's ex-lover, it was one of the first feature films to address the topic of AIDS patients dying with dignity
- Jerusalem (1996) – Swedish-Norwegian-Danish drama film inspired by real events from the end of the 19th century, a time when many people left Europe to find a better life abroad
- Justice for Annie: A Moment of Truth Movie (1996) – thriller drama television film based on the case of Deana Hubbard Wild, who was pushed to her death from a cliff near Monterey, California
- Kansas City (1996) – crime drama film loosely based on a true story about a 1933 kidnapping and ransom incident involving the city's chief manager
- The Late Shift (1996) – biographical comedy drama television film chronicling the late-night television conflict between Jay Leno and David Letterman in the early 1990s, surrounding NBC's appointment of Leno to succeed Johnny Carson as host of The Tonight Show, and Late Night host Letterman's resulting efforts to negotiate out of his contract with the network to host his own competing talk show for CBS
- The Making of the Mahatma (1996) – Indian-South African biographical historical drama film about the early life of Mohandas Karamchand Gandhi (also known as Mahatma Gandhi) during his 21 years in South Africa
- Michael Collins (1996) – American-British-Irish biographical historical drama film about Michael Collins, who was a leading figure in the early-20th-century Irish struggle for independence against Britain
- Mr. and Mrs. Loving (1996) – biographical romantic drama film based on the true story of Mildred and Richard Loving
- Nasser 56 (Egyptian Arabic: ناصر) (1996) – Egyptian historical drama film focusing on the nationalization of the Suez Canal by Egypt's second President, Gamal Abdel Nasser, and the subsequent Suez War with Israel, the United Kingdom, and France
- No One Would Tell (1996) – crime drama television film based on the true story of 14-year-old Amy Carnevale, who was physically abused and murdered by her 16-year-old boyfriend Jamie Fuller, on 23 August 1991, in Beverly, Massachusetts
- Norma Jean & Marilyn (1996) – biographical drama television film about the life of Marilyn Monroe
- Normal Life (1996) – crime drama film based on the real lives of husband-and-wife bank robbers, Jeffrey and Jill Erickson
- The One That Got Away (1996) – South African action drama television film telling the true story of a Special Air Service patrol during the Gulf War in 1991
- Over Here (1996) – British war drama miniseries chronicling the lives of US Army Air Corps B-17 Flying Fortress bomber crews on a Royal Air Force Spitfire base during World War II
- The People vs. Larry Flynt (1996) – biographical drama film chronicling the rise of pornographer Larry Flynt and his subsequent clash with religious institutions and the law
- Poznań '56 (1996) – Polish historical drama film about the Poznań 1956 protests
- Pretty Village, Pretty Flame (Serbian: Лепа села лепо горе) (1996) – Yugoslav historical drama film inspired by a real-life occurrence in eastern Bosnia from the opening stages of the Bosnian War, with the film's screenplay based on a Vanja Bulić-written, Duga magazine published long-form piece about the actual event
- Private Confessions (Swedish: Enskilda samtal) (1996) – Swedish biographical drama film based on Ingmar Bergman's stories about his parents complicated relationship life in his marriage and also some of his own childhood memories
- Public Enemies (1996) – crime thriller film centring on the 1930s figure Ma Barker and her criminal sons
- Race the Sun (1996) – comedy drama film loosely based on the true story of the Konawaena High School Solar Car Team, which finished 18th in the 1990 World Solar Challenge and first place among high school entries
- Rasputin: Dark Servant of Destiny (1996) – biographical historical drama television film chronicling the last four years (1912–16) of Grigori Rasputin's stint as a healer to Alexei Nikolaevich, Tsarevich of Russia; the heir apparent to the Russian throne as well as the only son of Tsar Nicholas II of Russia and Empress Alexandra Feodorovna; who suffered from hemophilia
- Rebound: The Legend of Earl "The Goat" Manigault (1996) – biographical sport drama television film about Earl Manigault, a legendary American street basketball player famous under his nickname of "The Goat"
- Rossini's Ghost (1996) – Canadian biographical drama television film centring around Gioachino Rossini, a composer whose friends never lose faith in him—even when things go wrong
- Rowing Through (1996) – Canadian-Japanese sport drama film centring on American sculler Tiff Wood as he tries to qualify for the 1984 Summer Olympics
- Saint-Ex (1996) – British biographical drama television film documenting the life of French author-aviator Antoine de Saint-Exupéry in the form of a "tone poem"
- Samson and Delilah (1996) – American-German-Italian Christian drama miniseries telling the biblical story of Samson and Delilah
- Seduced by Madness (1996) – crime thriller television film recounting the story of Wisconsin teacher Diane Borchardt, who hired teen students first to spy on her cheating husband and later to kill him
- Shine (1996) – Australian biographical drama film based on the life of David Helfgott, a pianist who suffered a mental breakdown and spent years in institutions
- The Siege at Ruby Ridge (1996) – historical drama television film about the confrontation between the family of Randy Weaver and the US federal government at Ruby Ridge in 1992
- Some Mother's Son (1996) – American-Irish historical drama film based on the true story of the 1981 hunger strike in the Maze Prison, in Northern Ireland
- Stand Against Fear (1996) – drama television film about a cheerleader who takes action when she faces sexual intimidation from football players at her schoolbased on a real-life incident, which occurred at Santa Clara High School in California
- Surviving Picasso (1996) – biographical drama film about Françoise Gilot, the only lover of Pablo Picasso who was strong enough to withstand his ferocious cruelty, and move on with her life
- To Brave Alaska (1996) – survival adventure drama television film based on the true story of a yuppie couple's Alaskan trip turning into a wilderness survival struggle.
- Twisted Desire (1996) – crime drama television film based on the 1990 murders of the parents of 14-year-old Jessica Wiseman
- Unabomber: The True Story (1996) – biographical drama television film telling the stories of three men: one who terrorized the U.S. from 1978 to 1995 by sending bombs through the mail; his brother who suspected him of being the Unabomber; and the postal inspector who investigated the bombings from the beginning
- Unforgivable (1996) – drama television film telling the story of the real life couple, Paul and Judy Hegstrom
- Voice from the Grave (1996) – mystery crime television film inspired by the February 1977 murder of 47-year-old respiratory therapist Teresita Basa in Chicago, Illinois
- White Squall (1996) – disaster survival coming-of-age drama film based on the fate of the brigantine Albatross, which sank 2 May 1961, allegedly because of a white squall
- The Whole Wide World (1996) – biographical romantic drama film depicting the relationship between pulp fiction writer Robert E. Howard and schoolteacher Novalyne Price Ellis
- Without Evidence (1996) – thriller drama film based on the true story of Michael Francke, who was the Head of Corrections for the state of Oregon before being murdered
