= List of 1992 films based on actual events =

This is a list of films and miniseries released in 1992 that are based on actual events. All films on this list are from American production unless indicated otherwise.

== 1992 ==
- 1492: Conquest of Paradise (1992) – epic historical drama film portraying a version of the travels to the New World by the Italian explorer Christopher Columbus and the effect this had on indigenous people
- A Killer Among Friends (1992) – crime drama television film based on the real life murder of Michele Avila
- A League of Their Own (1992) – sport comedy drama film depicting a fictionalized account of the real-life All-American Girls Professional Baseball League
- A Mother's Right: The Elizabeth Morgan Story (1992) – drama television film chronicling the story behind the Elizabeth Morgan case, in which a woman suspected her ex-husband was sexually abusing their three-year-old daughter
- A Private Matter (1992) – drama television film based on the true 1962 story of Sherri Finkbine, a woman who sought a medically recommended abortion, following thalidomide usage during her pregnancy, and endured a firestorm of public controversy about her decision
- A River Runs Through It (1992) – drama film following two sons of a Presbyterian minister, one studious and the other rebellious, as they grow up and come of age in the Rocky Mountain region during a span of time from roughly World War I to the early days of the Great Depression, including part of the Prohibition era, based on the 1976 semi-autobiographical novella A River Runs Through It by Norman Maclean
- A Thousand Heroes (1992) – disaster drama film based on a true story of United Airlines Flight 232, which crash-landed at Sioux City, Iowa on 19 July 1989
- All That Really Matters (Polish: Wszystko, co najważniejsze) (1992) – Polish biographical drama film about Aleksander Wat and his family's experiences with the Nazi invasion of Poland in 1939
- American Me (1992) – crime drama film loosely based on mafia boss Rodolfo Cadena
- Amy Fisher: My Story (1992) – thriller drama film based on the story of Amy Fisher's affair with Joey Buttafuoco, and her conviction for aggravated assault for shooting Buttafuoco's wife
- The Babe (1992) – biographical sport drama film about the life of famed baseball player Babe Ruth
- Baby Snatcher (1992) – drama television film based on a true story of the kidnapping of Rachael Ann White
- Becoming Colette (1992) – German-British-French biographical drama film about Henri Gauthier-Villars and Colette
- Bonnie & Clyde: The True Story (1992) – crime drama television film about American crime duo, Bonnie and Clyde
- The Boys of St. Vincent (1992) – Canadian biographical drama miniseries inspired by real events that took place at the Mount Cashel Orphanage in St. John's, Newfoundland, one of a number of child sexual abuse scandals in the Roman Catholic Church
- Chaplin (1992) – biographical comedy drama film about the life of English comic actor and filmmaker Charlie Chaplin
- Charles and Diana: Unhappily Ever After (1992) – biographical drama television film telling the real-life story of the failed marriage of Charles, Prince of Wales, and his first wife, Diana, Princess of Wales
- Child of Rage (1992) – biographical drama television film based on the true story of Beth Thomas, who had severe behavioral problems as a result of being sexually abused as a child
- Christopher Columbus: The Discovery (1992) – historical adventure film following events after the fall of the Emirate of Granada (an Arab principality which was located in the south of Spain), and leads up to the voyage of Columbus to the New World in 1492
- Citizen Cohn (1992) – biographical drama television film covering the life of Joseph McCarthy's controversial chief counsel Roy Cohn
- Daens (1992) – Belgian historical drama film telling the true story of Adolf Daens, a Catholic priest in Aalst who strives to improve the miserable working conditions in the local factories
- Day of Despair (Portuguese: O Dia do Desespero) (1992) – Portuguese drama film based on the life of Portuguese writer Camilo Castelo Branco
- De Bunker (1992) – Dutch war drama film about Gerrit Kleinveld, a Dutch resistance fighter during the Second World War
- Dead Ahead: The Exxon Valdez Disaster (1992) – disaster drama television film depicting the Exxon Valdez oil spill disaster off the coast of Alaska
- Death of a Neapolitan Mathematician (Italian: Morte di un matematico napoletano) (1992) – Italian biographical drama film about the death of Renato Caccioppoli, an Italian mathematician, known for his contributions to mathematical analysis, including the theory of functions of several complex variables, functional analysis, measure theory
- Diên Biên Phu (1992) – French epic war drama film portraying the 55-day siege of Dien Bien Phu, the last battle by the French Union's colonial army in the First Indochina War during the final days of French Indochina, which was soon after divided into North and South Vietnam
- Dreams of Russia (Russian: Сны о России; Japanese: おろしや国酔夢譚) (1992) – Soviet-Japanese historical drama film about real historical events in the interstate relations of the Russian Empire, during the time of Catherine II, and Japan, during the time of the Tokugawa shogunate
- Faraway Sunset (Japanese: 遠き落日) (1992) – Japanese biographical drama film about the Japanese scientist Hideyo Noguchi
- Final Shot: The Hank Gathers Story (1992) – biographical sport drama television film about the life of Loyola Marymount basketball player Eric "Hank" Gathers
- Frankie's House (1992) – British-Australian biographical drama miniseries based on the biography of British photographer Tim Page, especially focusing on his relationship with Sean Flynn – the son of Errol Flynn – during the Vietnam War
- The Girl in the Air (1992) – French drama film based on the true story of Nadine Vaujour who tried to spring her husband from prison by helicopter in 1986
- Grave Secrets: The Legacy of Hilltop Drive (1992) – mystery horror television film about the residents of new houses who experience disturbing supernatural phenomena, supposedly based on real events
- Hoffa (1992) – biographical crime drama film based on the life of Teamsters leader Jimmy Hoffa
- In the Best Interest of the Children (1992) – biographical drama television film telling the true story of a legal battle fought over custody of five siblings
- The Jacksons: An American Dream (1992) – biographical drama miniseries based upon the history of the Jackson family, one of the most successful musical families in show business, and the early and successful years of the popular Motown group The Jackson 5
- Jonathan: The Boy Nobody Wanted (1992) – biographical drama television film inspired by a true story concerning a landmark legal decision for rights of the disabled
- The Last of His Tribe (1992) – drama television film based on the experiences Alfred L. Kroeber who made friends with Ishi, thought to be the last of his people, the Yahi tribe
- The Long Day Closes (1992) – British biographical drama film portraying a semi-autobiographical account of Terence Davies' adolescence
- Lorenzo's Oil (1992) – biographical drama film based on the true story of Augusto and Michaela Odone, parents who search for a cure for their son Lorenzo's adrenoleukodystrophy (ALD), leading to the development of Lorenzo's oil
- The Lover (French: L'Amant) (1992) – French-Vietnamese romantic drama film based on the semi-autobiographical 1984 novel of the same name by Marguerite Duras, the film details the illicit affair between a teenage French girl and a wealthy Chinese man in 1929 French Indochina
- Malcolm X (1992) – epic biographical drama film about the African-American activist Malcolm X
- My Companions in the Bleak House (Czech: Přítelkyně z domu smutku) (1992) – [[Cinema of Czechoslovakia|Czechoslovak]] drama miniseries depicting a fictionalised account of Eva Kantůrková's time in prison on charges of sedition in Communist Czechoslovakia
- Newsies (1992) – historical musical drama film loosely based on the New York City Newsboys' strike of 1899
- Once Upon a Time in China II (Cantonese: 黃飛鴻之二男兒當自強) (1992) – Hong Kong martial arts film about Chinese martial arts master and folk hero of Cantonese ethnicity, Wong Fei-hung
- Orlando (1992) – British historical drama film inspired by the tumultuous family history of the aristocratic poet and novelist Vita Sackville-West
- The Quest for Freedom (1992) – historical drama television film about abolitionist Harriet Tubman
- Requiem for a Doll (Czech: Requiem pro panenku) (1992) – Czechoslovak psychological thriller drama film inspired by a real-life tragedy that cost the lives of 26 mentally disabled girls
- Ruby (1992) – biographical crime drama film about Jack Ruby, the Dallas, Texas nightclub owner who shot and killed Lee Harvey Oswald in the basement garage of a Dallas city police station in 1963
- Savage Nights (French: Les Nuits Fauves) (1992) – French biographical crime drama film based on Cyril Collard's semi-autobiographical novel Les Nuits Fauves, published in 1989
- Schtonk! (1992) – German satirical drama film retelling the story of the 1983 Hitler Diaries hoax
- Sinatra (1992) – biographical drama miniseries about singer Frank Sinatra
- Something to Live for: The Alison Gertz Story (1992) – drama television film based on the life of prominent AIDS activist Alison Gertz
- The Sound and the Silence (1992) – Canadian-New Zealander biographical drama television film about the life and works of Scottish inventor, Alexander Graham Bell
- Stalin (1992) – political drama television film telling the story of Stalin's rise to power until his death and spans the period from 1917 to 1953
- Stay the Night (1992) – crime drama miniseries depicting the true story of the controversial romance between a small town teenage boy named Michael Kettman and a free-spirited older married woman named Jimmie Sue Finger
- Sunday's Children (Swedish: Söndagsbarn) (1992) – Swedish biographical drama film about the life of Church of Sweden minister Erik Bergman
- Swoon (1992) – crime drama film recounting the 1924 Leopold and Loeb murder case, focusing more on the homosexuality of the killers than other films based on the case
- Taking Back My Life: The Nancy Ziegenmeyer Story (1992) – drama television film about a rape victim who spoke out about her experiences and raised awareness of the fact that rape and sexual assault are never the victim's fault
- Teamster Boss: The Jackie Presser Story (1992) – crime drama film about the life of Jackie Presser, an American labor leader and president of the International Brotherhood of Teamsters from 1983 until his death in 1988
- Those Old Love Letters (Estonian: Need vanad armastuskirjad) (1992) – Estonian biographical drama film about the life of Raimond Valgre, an Estonian songwriter of the 1930s and the 1940s
- Thunderheart (1992) – Neo-Western mystery film loosely based on a fictional portrayal of events relating to the Wounded Knee incident in 1973, when followers of the American Indian Movement seized the South Dakota town of Wounded Knee in protest against federal government policy regarding Native Americans
- To Catch a Killer (1992) – biographical crime miniseries based on the true story of the pursuit of American serial killer John Wayne Gacy
- The Waterdance (1992) – romantic drama film depicting a semi-autobiographical story about a young fiction writer who becomes tetraplegic fully paralyzed in a hiking accident and works to rehabilitate his body and mind at a rehabilitation center
- Willing to Kill: The Texas Cheerleader Story (1992) – thriller drama television film about Wanda Holloway, an American woman from Channelview, Texas who was convicted of attempting to hire a hitman to kill the mother of her daughter's junior high school cheerleading rival
