= Kirk (TV series) =

- Genre: Family sitcom
- Created by: Ross Brown
- Developed by: William Bickley; Michael Warren
- Starring: Kirk Cameron; Chelsea Noble; Will Estes; Louis Vanaria; Taylor Fry; Courtland Mead; Debra Mooney
- Theme music composer: Steven Chesne; Gary Boren
- Composers: Gary Boren; Steven Chesne
- Country of origin: United States
- Original language: English
- No. of seasons: 2
- No. of episodes: 32 (1 unaired)

Production
- Executive producers: William Bickley; Michael Warren; Charlotte Brown; Ross Brown; Susan Fales-Hill
- Producers: Brenda Hanes-Berg; Karen K. Miller
- Camera setup: Multi-camera
- Running time: 22–24 minutes
- Production companies: Bickley-Warren Productions; Warner Bros. Television

Original release
- Network: The WB
- Release: August 23, 1995 – November 10, 1996

Kirk is an American family sitcom that aired on The WB from August 23, 1995, to November 10, 1996. The series was created by Ross Brown, and produced by Bickley-Warren Productions in association with Warner Bros. Television. Kirk was the follow-up starring vehicle for Kirk Cameron after his seven-year role as Mike Seaver on the ABC sitcom Growing Pains.

== Synopsis ==
The show revolves around Kirk Hartman (Cameron), an aspiring illustrator and recent college graduate living in Greenwich Village. After his aunt decides to move to Florida to get married, Kirk is left in charge of his younger brothers and sister. It also stars Chelsea Noble, Will Estes, Courtland Mead, Louis Vanaria, and Debra Mooney.

== Cast ==
- Kirk Cameron as Kirk Hartman
- Chelsea Noble as Elizabeth Waters
- Louis Vanaria as Eddie Balducci
- Will Estes as Cory Hartman
- Taylor Fry as Phoebe Hartman
- Courtland Mead as Russell Hartman
- Debra Mooney as Sally

== Production ==
Kirk was one of only two series produced by Bickley-Warren Productions that was not produced by Miller-Boyett Productions (the other being Hangin' with Mr. Cooper, which William Bickley and Michael Warren served as showrunners/executive producers during that series' final three seasons).

During the development stage, the series originally went under the working title Life Happens, and was originally conceived as a series for ABC (who had broadcast other series produced by Bickley and Warren, and their production partners Thomas L. Miller and Robert L. Boyett) before ABC's decision to move away from family sitcoms, just prior to ABC's 1995 purchase by The Walt Disney Company.

== Episodes ==
=== Series overview ===
Season	Episodes	Originally released	
Season	Episodes	First released	Last released
1	21	August 23, 1995	May 12, 1996
2	11	September 8, 1996	November 10, 1996

=== Season 1 (1995–96) ===
No. overall	No. in season	Title	Directed by	Written by	Original release date	Prod. code	Viewers (millions)
1	1	"Welcome to New York"	William Bickley	Ross Brown	August 23, 1995	457451	3.6
2	2	"S'Wonderbra"	William Bickley	David Simon & Leslie Ray	August 30, 1995	457452	3.8
3	3	"Night at the Movies"	William Bickley	Nancy Steen	September 17, 1995	457453	N/A
4	4	"Love! Valor! Deception!"	Rich Correll	David Steven Cohen	September 24, 1995	457455	3.0
5	5	"Magno Man vs. Capt. Chunks"	Rich Correll	Matthew Berry & Eric Abrams	October 1, 1995	457454	1.5
6	6	"Smart and Smarter"	William Bickley	Ellen Guylas	October 8, 1995	457457	2.6
7	7	"The Crush"	William Bickley	Scott Spencer Gorden	October 15, 1995	457459	2.5
8	8	"Helloween"	Rich Correll	Lisa A. Bannick	October 29, 1995	457456	3.2
9	9	"Educating Kirk"	William Bickley	David Cohen	November 5, 1995	457458	2.5
10	10	"Kirk Unplugged"	Rich Correll	Matthew Berry & Eric Abrams	November 12, 1995	457460	3.2
11	11	"A Kiss is Just a Kiss"	Rich Correll	Scott Spencer Gorden	November 19, 1995	457461	2.8
12	12	"The Christmas Show"	Rich Correll	David Simon & Leslie Ray	December 10, 1995	457462	2.9
13	13	"The Spare"	William Bickley	Liz Sage	January 7, 1996	457464	3.2
14	14	"The Love Letter"	William Bickley	Nancy Steen	January 14, 1996	457463	3.6
15	15	"Double Date"	Steve Muscarella	Bob Underwood	February 4, 1996	457466	3.2
16	16	"Stuck On You"	William Bickley	Ron Burla	February 11, 1996	457465	3.6
17	17	"The Odd Couple"	James Hampton	Gail Honigberg	February 18, 1996	457467	2.9
18	18	"Hey, Hey We're the Hartmans"	Rich Correll	Ron Burla	February 25, 1996	457468	4.0
19	19	"Baby, You Can Drive My Car"	Rich Correll	Nancy Steen	April 28, 1996	457469	3.1
20	20	"Operation Kirk"	William Bickley	David Simon & Leslie Ray	May 5, 1996	457470	3.8
21	21	"The Beach House"	William Bickley	William Bickley & Michael Warren	May 12, 1996	457471	3.0

=== Season 2 (1996) ===
No. overall	No. in season	Title	Directed by	Written by	Original release date	Prod. code	Viewers (millions)
22	1	"For Whom The Wedding Bells Toll: Parts 1 & 2"	Rich Correll	Susan Fales	September 8, 1996	465951	3.9
23	2	"For Whom The Wedding Bells Toll: Parts 1 & 2"	Joel Zwick	Michael A. Ross & Thom Bray	September 8, 1996	465952	3.9
24	3	"Yours, Mine and Ours"	Unknown	Unknown	September 15, 1996	465953	2.5
25	4	"She Stoops to Conquer!"	Steve Muscarella	Allison M. Gibson	September 22, 1996	465954	3.0
26	5	"Strangers in the Night"	Scott Baio	Mike Costa	September 29, 1996	465955	2.3
27	6	"Hire Learning"	Scott Baio	Jill Cargerman	October 6, 1996	465956	3.5
28	7	"Something's Got to Give"	James Hampton	Ron Burla	October 13, 1996	465957	2.5
29	8	"Balducci Blues"	Unknown	Unknown	October 20, 1996	465958	3.8
30	9	"Oh, What a Tangled Web We Weave: Part 1"	James Hampton	Michael A. Ross & Thom Bray	November 3, 1996	465959	3.1
31	10	"Oh, What a Tangled Web We Weave: Part 2"	Unknown	Unknown	November 10, 1996	465960	3.2
32	11	"Witness for the Persecution"	N/A	N/A	Unaired	465961	N/A

== Awards and nominations ==
Year	Award	Category	Recipient	Result
1996	Young Artist Awards	Best Performance by an Actor Under Ten – Television	Courtland Mead	Nominated
1996	Young Artist Awards	Best Performance by a Young Actor – TV Comedy Series	Will Estes	Nominated
