= Casey Siemaszko =

American actor (born 1961)

- Born: Kazimierz Andrew Siemaszko; March 17, 1961 (age 65); Chicago, Illinois, U.S.
- Education: DePaul University (BFA)
- Occupation: Actor
- Years active: 1983–present
- Relatives: Nina Siemaszko (sister)

Kazimierz Andrew "Casey" Siemaszko (see-MASH-ko; born March 17, 1961) is an American actor. He had supporting roles in Back to the Future, Stand By Me, and Of Mice and Men. He also had a leading role for the film Three O'Clock High.

== Personal life ==
Siemaszko was born in Chicago and grew up on the city's northwest side. He attended Saint Ignatius College Preparatory School and graduated from the Goodman School of Drama at DePaul University in 1983. His father, Konstanty (1918–1999), was a Polish Roman Catholic and a former member of the Polish Navy. He joined the Polish Underground and was a survivor of the Sachsenhausen concentration camp. He immigrated to Chicago in 1959 and became a well-known local choreographer and a fixture in the Polish community. His mother, Collette McAllister (1931–2008), was English. His sister Nina is an actress and his brother, Corky, is a writer for Daily News and a reporter for NBC News.

== Filmography ==
=== Film ===
Year	Title	Role	Notes
1983	Class	Doug	
1985	Secret Admirer	Roger Despard	
1985	Back to the Future	3-D	
1986	Stand by Me	Billy Tessio	
1987	Gardens of Stone	Wildman	
1987	Three O'Clock High	Jerry Mitchell	
1988	Biloxi Blues	Private Donald J. Carney	
1988	Young Guns	Charlie Bowdre	
1989	Breaking In	Mike Lafebb	
1989	Back to the Future Part II	3-D	
1992	Of Mice and Men	Curley	
1994	Teresa's Tattoo	Michael	
1994	Milk Money	"Cash"	
1995	Napoleon	Conan / Pengi	Voice
1995	Black Scorpion	Dr. Goddard	
1996	The Phantom	Morgan	
1997	Bliss	Tanner	
1998	Taxman	Abrasha Topolev	
1999	Limbo	Bobby Gastineau	
2000	The Crew	Young Bobby Bartellemeo	
2009	Public Enemies	Harry Berman	

=== Television ===
Year	Title	Role	Notes
1984	Silence of the Heart	Jeff	Television film
1984	The Facts of Life	Brian	Episode: "Smile"
1984–1985	St. Elsewhere	Rick Messina	3 episodes
1985	Amazing Stories	Jonathan	Episode: "The Mission"
1991	The Chase	Phillip Hutchinson	Television film
1993	Tribeca	"Red" Grady	Episode: "Heros Exoletus"
1994	The Adventures of Brisco County, Jr.	Ned Zed	Episode: "Ned Zed"
1994	704 Hauser	Joey Stivic	Episode: "Meet the Cumberbatchs"
1996	Too Something	Angry Competitive Guy	2 episodes
1996	Mistrial	Detective Bobby Zito	Television film
1997–2009	Law & Order	Mr. Shuman / Green's Union Delegate / Bart Rainey	3 episodes
1997	Chicago Sons	Frank	Episode: "To Have and to Hold"
1997	Rose Hill	Fergus Carroll	Television film
1999	Chameleon II: Death Match	Jake Booker	Television film
1999	Storm of the Century	Alton "Hatch" Hatcher	Miniseries
2000	Falcone	Ray Cerrone	2 episodes
2002–2004	NYPD Blue	IAB Captain Pat Fraker	13 episodes
2003	Oz	Detective Tarnowski	2 episodes
2004	Law & Order: Criminal Intent	Harvey Gruenwald	Episode: "Unrequited"
2005	The Inside	Billy Ray Pope	Episode: "Thief of Hearts"
2006	CSI: NY	Paul Sabotini	Episode: "Run Silent, Run Deep"
2007	Law & Order: Special Victims Unit	EPA Official	Episode: "Loophole"
2007	The Bronx Is Burning	Detective Welker	Episode: "The Seven Commandments"
2007–2012	Damages	Dan Williams	12 episodes
2008	New Amsterdam	Peter Huygens	Episode: "Golden Boy"
2010	The Event	Frank Decosta	Episode: "I Haven't Told You Everything"
2012	Blue Bloods	Josh Thorp	Episode: "Collateral Damage"
2012	Louie	Homeless Man	Episode: "Daddy's Girlfriend: Part 2"
2012	White Collar	Bert "Bertie" Slavkin	Episode: "Parting Shots"
2012	NYC 22	Allen Blume	3 episodes
2012	Elementary	Michael McGee	Episode: "While You Were Sleeping"
2013	Killing Kennedy	Jack Ruby	Television film
2014	The Blacklist	Sam Raimo	Episode: "Mako Tanida (No.83)"
2015	Unforgettable	Greg Zartane	Episode: "Blast from the Past"
2016	Billions	Seids	Episode: "Short Squeeze"

=== Video games ===
Year	Title	Voice role
2004	Red Dead Revolver	Conductor / Hank Pullman / Jason Cornet / Cowboys #2
2004	Grand Theft Auto: San Andreas	Johnny Sindacco / Pedestrian
2018	Red Dead Redemption 2	Wróbel
