= Cry in the Wild: The Taking of Peggy Ann =

1991 American television film by Charles Correll

- DVD cover
- Genre: Crime; Drama
- Written by: Durrell Royce Crays
- Directed by: Charles Correll
- Starring: Megan Follows; David Morse; Dion Anderson
- Music by: Sylvester Levay
- Original language: English

Production
- Executive producers: Joel Fields; Ronald H. Gilbert; Leonard Hill
- Producer: Ardythe Goergens
- Production locations: Cupertino, California; Los Altos Hills, California; San Jose, California
- Cinematography: Steven Shaw
- Editor: Mark Rosenbaum
- Running time: 90 minutes
- Production companies: Leonard Hill Films; Ron Gilbert Associates

Original release
- Network: NBC
- Release: May 6, 1991

Cry in the Wild: The Taking of Peggy Ann is a 1991 American television movie directed by Charles Correll. The plot is based on the true story of the abduction of Peggy Ann Bradnick by an ex-convict and ex-mental patient William Diller Hollenbaugh which took place in Shade Gap, Pennsylvania on May 11, 1966. The film was first aired on NBC, on May 6, 1991, and was the most-watched primetime show of the week.

== Cast ==
- David Morse as Bicycle Pete
- Megan Follows as Peggy Ann Bradnick
- Dion Anderson as Ruegg
- Tom Atkins as Jamieson
- Travis Swords as Mitulski
- David Soul as Terry Anderson
- Jack Kehler as Eugene Bradnick
- Taylor Fry as Carol Jean Bradnick
