= Taylor Fry =

Former American child actress

- Born: Taylor McQuiston Fry; August 1, 1981 (age 45); San Mateo, California, U.S.
- Education: University of California, Santa Barbara
- Occupations: Actress (formerly), Ultimate Frisbee player
- Years active: 1988–1996

Taylor McQuiston Fry (born August 1, 1981) is a former American child actress.

== Education ==
She later attended and graduated from the University of California, Santa Barbara in 2003, where she became an avid Ultimate Frisbee player.

== Career ==
On film, Fry appeared in roles in Die Hard, North, and A Little Princess. On television, she has starring roles in Nightingales, Get a Life and Kirk. Fry graduated from Notre Dame High School in 1999, along with fellow actors Rami Malek and Rachel Bilson.

== Filmography ==
=== Film ===
Year	Title	Role	Notes
1988	Die Hard	Lucy McClane	
1994	North	Zoe	
1995	A Little Princess	Lavinia	

=== Television ===
Year	Title	Role	Notes
1988	Coming of Age	Nancy	Episode: "The Kids Are Coming, the Kids Are Coming"
1988	Necessary Parties	Jenny Mills	TV film
1989	Nightingales	Megan Sullivan	Regular role (13 episodes)
1989	Midnight Caller	Third Child	Episode: "Someone to Love"
1989	Just the Ten of Us	Little Marie	Episode: "Highway to Heaven"
1990	Too Young to Die?	Sally	TV film
1990	Dark Avenger	Tracy	TV film
1990	Hunter	Amanda Lydell	Episode: "The Usual Suspects"
1990	Over My Dead Body	Lorelei	Episode: "Obits and Pieces"
1990	Uncle Buck	Kimberly	Episode: "Bluebell Buck"
1990–1992	Get a Life	Amy Potter	Recurring role (16 episodes)
1991	Cry in the Wild: The Taking of Peggy Ann	Carol Jean Bradnick	TV film
1991	Death Dreams	Jennie	TV film
1991	Eerie, Indiana	Little Girl	Episode: "Scariest Home Videos"
1991–1992	Jake and the Fatman	Sarah Capshaw	Recurring role (5 episodes)
1992	Ned Blessing: The True Story of My Life	Young Jilly Blue	TV film
1992	Herman's Head	Little Suzie	Episode: "Twisted Sister"
1992	Roseanne	Nicole	Episode: "Aliens"
1992	A Private Matter	Sandra Harper	TV film
1993	FBI: The Untold Stories		Episode: "Dapper Drew"
1993	Empty Nest	Little Girl	Episode: "My Dad, My Doctor"
1994	The Good Life	Jennifer	Episode: "Melissa the Thief"
1995–1996	Kirk	Phoebe Hartman	Regular role (31 episodes)
