= Kidnapping of Peggy Ann Bradnick =

1966 crime near Shade Gap, Pennsylvania, US

Peggy Bradnick
- Born: Peggy Ann Bradnick; August 16, 1948 (age 78); Shade Gap, Pennsylvania
- Known for: being kidnapped

The kidnapping of Peggy Ann Bradnick took place near Shade Gap, Pennsylvania, on May 11, 1966. Bradnick, who was 17 years old at the time, was kidnapped by William Diller Hollenbaugh and held captive for seven days before she was rescued by Pennsylvania State Police and the Federal Bureau of Investigation (FBI) at a farm in Burnt Cabins, Pennsylvania. Her ordeal made national headlines, and the search was the largest manhunt in United States history at the time. One FBI agent, Terry R. Anderson, was shot and killed in pursuit of Hollenbaugh.

== Prelude ==
Peggy Ann was born August 16, 1948, the oldest of six children of Eugene and Mildred Bradnick. At the time she was kidnapped, she had a brother Jim (age 16); a sister Mary Louise (11); twin brother and sister Donnie and Debbie (9); and a sister Carol Jean (8). The family lived near Shade Gap, Pennsylvania, a small village in Huntingdon County. Peggy Ann attended Southern Huntingdon County High School.

Hollenbaugh had been convicted of burglary in 1939 and spent the next 20 years in prison and an insane asylum. In 1962, he came to Shade Gap and was known as "The Bicycle Man" or "Bicycle Pete" because he rode a bicycle all around the area.

Hollenbaugh claimed to Peggy Ann that he was responsible for several incidents prior to kidnapping her. For instance, in August 1964, he broke into the home of Mrs. Christine Devinney, shot a rifle out of her hand, then bound her wound and left. Shortly thereafter, a woman driving on a back road was blocked by a pile of logs, whereupon a man fired a shot, breaking her baby's nursing bottle. On April 16, 1965, Ned Price surprised a trespasser on his property and was then shot, losing a leg. These incidents and others led to this sniper being known as "The Mountain Man".

== Kidnapping ==
On May 11, 1966, as Peggy Ann and her five siblings were walking home from the school bus stop, Hollenbaugh intercepted them, grabbing Peggy Ann and dragging her into the woods.

Leaving Mary Louise to tend to the younger children, Jim Bradnick ran home and told his father, who was home frying chicken for dinner. (Their mother was at a housecleaning job.) Eugene Bradnick went to the woods to find Peggy Ann; when he was unable to find her, he went into town to notify the police.

Stopping in a clearing in the woods, Hollenbaugh took off his goggles and stowed them in a haversack he was carrying. He then took out a cheek-filler made from two wooden discs wired together. Peggy Ann, startled, said, "I think I know who you are," and identified him as the "Bicycle Man." He then removed a second jacket and pair of pants and ordered Peggy Ann to wear them over her dress, saying, "That red dress sticks out like a sore thumb."

Hollenbaugh guided Peggy Ann under the Pennsylvania Turnpike through a culvert and out of the search area, but then became worried about his dogs and took her north of the turnpike again. He fetched a chain, chained her to a tree, and attempted to get his dogs, but was unsuccessful. Hollenbaugh instead took Peggy Ann to a cave that he had dug into an area in the Tuscarora Mountains, known as Gobbler's Knob, and acquired a couple of cans of food, which he shared with her. A few days later, he was able to fetch his dogs.

On May 16, Hollenbaugh forced Peggy Ann to accompany him as he burglarized a house, in which he found a .32 automatic.

On May 17, FBI agent Terry Ray Anderson spotted one of Hollenbaugh's dogs and called to it. Hollenbaugh saw him and opened fire, killing Anderson. He then shot two tracking dogs, killing one. Some of the other searchers spotted Peggy Ann, confirming that she was still alive. Hollenbaugh and Peggy Ann disappeared into the forest before the searchers could reach them.

That evening, after being unable to escape the search area by going under a bridge near Fort Littleton, Hollenbaugh came to a hunting lodge in Burnt Cabins with a car parked outside. The lodge had an outside wash house, in which he made Peggy Ann hide with him. Shortly after dawn, Cambria County Deputy Sheriff Francis Sharpe came out to use the wash house and was shot and wounded by Hollenbaugh, who then forced Sharpe to drive him and Peggy Ann toward the Pennsylvania Turnpike. The car, however, was stopped by a closed cattle gate and Hollenbaugh ordered Sharpe to open it. Sharpe saw officers near the gate and called out to them that Hollenbaugh was in the car. Hollenbaugh began firing through the car windows, left the car, and eventually got away, taking Peggy Ann with him down to US 522 to a farm owned by Luther Rubeck.

== Rescue ==
A massive manhunt ensued around the hills surrounding Shade Gap, looking for any sign of Peggy Ann and her abductor. Over 1,000 federal, state and local law officers, National Guardsmen, and civilian volunteers were involved, making it the largest manhunt conducted in United States history up to that time.

Hollenbaugh and Peggy Ann were later discovered by searchers at the Rubeck farm. Hollenbaugh opened fire with a pistol, ducked behind a corncrib, and ran across the road to the porch of the farmhouse. Two shots rang out simultaneously—one fired by Larry Rubeck (age 15) from the farmhouse, the other by a state policeman. Hollenbaugh was fatally wounded. At first it was thought that Larry Rubeck had killed Hollenbaugh, and newspapers reported it as such, publishing that afternoon (May 18, 1966) and the following morning. It was later determined that State Trooper Grant H. Mixell had fired the fatal shot.

Peggy Ann was taken to the Fulton County Medical Center and was reunited with her family. She had no serious injuries and had not been sexually assaulted, but her feet were badly blistered and she was dehydrated. She gave an interview with the media a few days later and left the Medical Center on June 1.

== Aftermath ==
The true crime book Deadly Pursuit by Robert V. Cox details the incident. Robert Cox won the Pulitzer Prize in 1967 for Local General or Spot News Reporting "for his vivid deadline reporting of a mountain manhunt that ended with the killing of a deranged sniper who had terrorized the community."

Peggy Ann Bradnick told her story to the Saturday Evening Post, and it was published in the July 16, 1966 edition.

On October 16, 2008, Peggy Ann Bradnick Jackson made her first major public appearance as the featured speaker at the Fulton County Historical Society's Fulton Fall Folk Festival to a standing room only crowd. She made a return appearance there on Thursday, October 14, 2010. She has made other public appearances since. On Sunday, October 16, 2011, a marker was erected at the cemetery in Shade Gap, Pennsylvania, to honor slain FBI Agent Terry Ray Anderson. Peggy Ann, who by that point was retired, was present at the ceremony. She was a featured speaker at the Fulton County Historical Society Spring Banquet on April 16, 2016, the 50th anniversary year of the kidnapping. On Tuesday, May 10, 2016, she appeared at a ceremony in Carlisle, Pennsylvania, to mark the 50th anniversary of Anderson's death.

Peggy Ann visited the Pennsylvania State Police Museum, located in Hershey, Pennsylvania, where her story is featured. Case artifacts (Hollenbaugh's bicycle, weapons, etc.), photographs, and more information can be viewed at the museum.

On March 20, 2017, Peggy Jackson's autobiography, The Voice in the Mountains, was made available on Amazon.com as a trade paperback. It joins Robert Cox's Deadly Pursuit and Ken Peiffer's limited edition Trail of Terror (published by the Antietam Historical Society, Waynesboro, Pennsylvania) in documenting the Mountain Man incident, although it contains substantial differences.

== Fictional portrayals ==
An NBC movie of the week, Cry in the Wild: The Taking of Peggy Ann, was produced about the kidnapping and first shown on May 6, 1991. It starred Megan Follows as Peggy Ann Bradnick, David Morse as Hollenbaugh, David Soul as Agent Anderson, and Taylor Fry as Carol Jean Bradnick.

John Madara, David White, and Jimmy Wisner wrote a song called "Eight Days at Sha-de Gap" in 1967, sung by Russ Edwards and recorded on the Decca label.

== See also ==
- List of kidnappings
- Lists of solved missing person cases
