= The Chase (1991 film) =

1991 film by Paul Wendkos

- DVD cover
- Genre: Crime drama
- Written by: Guerdon Trueblood
- Directed by: Paul Wendkos
- Starring: Casey Siemaszko; Ben Johnson; Robert Beltran; Barry Corbin
- Music by: W. G. Snuffy Walden
- Country of origin: United States
- Original language: English

Production
- Executive producer: Steve White
- Producers: Barry Bernardi; Paul Wendkos
- Cinematography: Chuck Arnold
- Editor: Christopher Cooke
- Running time: 93 minutes
- Production companies: Steve White Productions; Spectacor Films

Original release
- Network: NBC
- Release: February 10, 1991

The Chase is a 1991 American crime drama television film directed by Paul Wendkos, written by Guerdon Trueblood, and starring Casey Siemaszko and Ben Johnson. It is based on the true story of American criminal Phillip Hutchinson, who robbed a bank, killed a police officer, and took a man hostage in a 1988 rampage in Denver, Colorado.

The film aired on NBC on February 10, 1991, to tie in with the three-year anniversary of the rampage, which occurred on February 9, 1988.

== Plot ==
In January 1988, in Denver, Colorado, KCNC-TV helicopter pilot Mike Silva flies over Denver to allow cameraman Jim Stair to get aerial shots of the area. Meanwhile, escaped convict Phillip Hutchinson, under the alias of Mark Taylor, has fled from Texas to reside in Denver, where he works as a car mechanic. While working in Denver, Hutchinson carries out various crimes, including the armed robbery of a local store and the mugging of a courier delivering some money, whom he beats up with a crowbar. A witness spots Hutchinson fleeing in a red Chevrolet K5 Blazer and reports it to the Denver Police Department, but Hutchinson has his coworker Tom repaint the vehicle brown. Through his coworker, Hutchinson meets a girl named Roxanne, who he starts a relationship with, though he does not tell her about his criminal life. However, after he finds Roxanne has been going through his belongings, he chases her out of his apartment.

Denver PD Detective Bob Wallis and Texan Detective Hammer investigate Hutchinson's activities. Wallis' son Dale is also a police officer, and his wife is expecting a baby. Wallis plans to retire soon to spend more time with his family and upcoming grandchild, as he regrets not being around for Dale when he was younger. Meanwhile, teenage girl Tammie, who works as a bank teller at the Rio Grande Operating Credit Union office, confides to a coworker that she is insecure about her appearance and lacks self-confidence. Another girl elsewhere, Gloria Whipple, struggles to pay her bills and get to work on time, a struggle compounded by the lack of support from her drug-addicted boyfriend Julian; unbeknownst to Julian, Whipple is pregnant.

A month later, on February 9, 1988, Wallis is now a grandfather and plans to retire, Tammie still works at the Union office, and Whipple reconnects with her estranged father. On this particular date, Hutchinson decides to rob the Union office, planning to flee for Brazil. Holding up the bank with a handgun, he demands Tammie transfer the bank's money into his suitcase. Tammie activates a silent alarm to alert the police, but Hutchinson flees in his Blazer before they can arrive. Wallis and Hammer respond to the scene, as do Silva and Stair, who decide to fly over and record the ensuing pursuit.

Police intercept Hutchinson and attempt to cut him off but fail. Wallis and Hammer attempt as well but see that Hutchinson is heading directly for them and attempt to escape their cruiser. However, Wallis' seatbelt fails to release, and by the time he manages to get out, Hutchinson strikes him with the Blazer, killing him instantly. The pursuing officers lose sight of Hutchinson, but Silva and Stair remain overhead. Hutchinson crashes the Blazer and flees on foot, encountering Whipple and Julian and attempting to carjack them. Julian runs off while Whipple drives away, missing gunfire from Hutchinson. Continuing on, Hutchinson encounters John Laurienti and his disabled daughter and forces Laurienti to drive him away in his green Chevrolet C/K. Silva, realizing the police do not know what vehicle Hutchinson is in, and being unable to inform them, flies the helicopter directly in front of the truck and lands in front of them, forcing it to stop. Police are then alerted to Hutchinson's whereabouts and surround the truck. Laurienti is pulled from the vehicle unharmed, and Hutchinson is shot dead by police after attempting to shoot Laurienti and the officers.

In the aftermath, Whipple ends her relationship with Julian and is in a much stronger relationship with her father, who is supporting her during her pregnancy. Wallis' son Dale gives a speech at his father's funeral and breaks down over the sudden death of his father. Tammie, now self-confident, plans to head off to college. Laurienti survives and is given a new white truck on behalf of KCNC-TV.

== Cast ==
- Casey Siemaszko as Phillip Hutchinson
- Ben Johnson as John Laurienti
- Gerry Bamman as Peter, the KCNC-TV director
- Robert Beltran as Mike Silva
- Barry Corbin as Bob Wallis
- Megan Follows as Gloria Whipple
- Sheila Kelley as Roxanne
- Ricki Lake as Tammie
- Anthony Tyler Quinn as Dale Wallis
- Gailard Sartain as Hammer
- Jimmie F. Skaggs as Tom, Hutchinson's coworker
- Micole Mercurio
- Nada Despotovich as Fran
- Daniel Quinn as Julian
- Georgia Emelin
- Paul Collins as Gloria's father
- Paul Borrillo as Jim Stair
- Charles A. Tamburro as Pilot

== Reception ==
Variety wrote that the film is unsubtle but recreates the event with "attention-getting incisiveness". Ken Tucker of Entertainment Weekly rated it a letter grade of A− and wrote, "Terse and tense, The Chase is chilling."
