= List of 1998 films based on actual events =

This is a list of films and miniseries released in 1998 that are based on actual events. All films on this list are from American production unless indicated otherwise.

== 1998 ==
- 23 (German: 23 – Nichts ist so wie es scheint) (1998) – German drama thriller film about young hacker Karl Koch, who died on 23 May 1989, a presumed suicide
- 54 (1998) – drama film focusing on the rise and fall of Studio 54, a famous nightclub in New York City during the late 1970s and early 1980s
- A Bright Shining Lie (1998) – war drama television film telling the true story of John Paul Vann's experience in the Vietnam War
- A Civil Action (1998) – courtroom drama film telling the true story of a court case about environmental pollution that took place in Woburn, Massachusetts in the 1980s
- A Father for Brittany (1998) – drama television film based on a true story of a husband and wife who try to adopt a baby, only for cancer to get in the way
- Abgehauen (1998) – German biographical drama television film about the life of Manfred Krug
- Aftershocks (1998) – Australian drama television film about the 1989 Newcastle earthquake
- The Apple (Persian: سیب) (1998) – Iranian drama film based on the true story of two sisters who were imprisoned for twelve years by their parents
- April (Italian: Aprile) (1998) – Italian biographical drama film about Nanni Moretti
- At the End of the Day: The Sue Rodriguez Story (1998) – Canadian drama television film about the life of Canadian right to die advocate Sue Rodriguez
- Bad As I Wanna Be: The Dennis Rodman Story (1998) – biographical sport drama television film about basketball player Dennis Rodman
- The Boys (1998) – Australian crime drama film influenced by the 1986 murder of Anita Cobby
- The Brylcreem Boys (1998) – British romantic comedy film set against the extraordinary neutrality arrangements in Ireland during World War II
- Cider with Rosie (1998) – British biographical drama television film depicting an account of Laurie Lee's childhood in the village of Slad, Gloucestershire, England, in the period soon after the First World War
- Dangerous Beauty (1998) – historical biographical drama film about Veronica Franco, a courtesan in sixteenth-century Venice who becomes a hero to her city, but later becomes the target of an inquisition by the Church for witchcraft
- The Day Lincoln Was Shot (1998) – historical biographical drama television film depicting the assassination of Abraham Lincoln
- The Day of the Roses (1998) – Australian disaster drama miniseries based on the events of the 1977 Granville railway disaster
- Diana: A Tribute to the People's Princess (1998) – biographical drama television film about Diana, Princess of Wales
- Elizabeth (1998) – British historical biographical drama film based on the early years of English Queen Elizabeth I's reign, where she is elevated to the throne after the death of her half-sister Mary I, who had imprisoned her
- Endurance (1998) – biographical drama film about the famous distance runner Haile Gebrselassie
- Escape: Human Cargo (1998) – action television film based on the true story of an American businessman who loses his passport and exit visa in Saudi Arabia
- Fear and Loathing in Las Vegas (1998) – stoner black comedy road film detailing Raoul Duke and Dr. Gonzo's journey through Las Vegas as their initial journalistic intentions devolve into an exploration of the city under the influence of psychoactive substances
- Fifteen and Pregnant (1998) – drama television film based on the true story of a pregnant 15-year-old girl
- Forever Love (1998) – romantic drama television film partially based on Annie Shapiro's awakening
- The General (1998) – Irish crime drama film about Dublin crime boss Martin Cahill, who undertook several daring heists in the early 1980s and attracted the attention of the Garda Síochána, IRA and Ulster Volunteer Force
- Genghis Khan (Mandarin: 代天骄成吉思汗) (1998) – Chinese biographical drama film telling the story of Genghis Khan
- Glory & Honor (1998) – biographical drama television film based on the true story of Robert Peary and Matthew Henson's 1909 journey to the Geographic North Pole, and their nearly 20-year history of exploring the Arctic together
- Gods and Monsters (1998) – historical drama film depicting a partly fictionalized account of the last days of the life of film director James Whale, known for directing Frankenstein (1931) and Bride of Frankenstein (1935)
- Gia (1998) – biographical drama film about the life and times of one of the first supermodels, Gia Carangi
- Hilary and Jackie (1998) – British biographical drama film about British classical musician sisters Jacqueline du Pré and Hilary du Pré, covering Jacqueline's meteoric rise to fame, her alleged affair with Hilary's husband Christopher Finzi, and her struggle with multiple sclerosis starting in her late 20s ultimately leading to her death at the age of 42
- Houdini (1998) – biographical drama television film about the life of the magician Harry Houdini
- Jeremiah (1998) – Christian drama television film depicting the biblical story of Jeremiah
- Jinnah (1998) – Pakistani-British epic biographical film following the life of the founder of Pakistan, Muhammad Ali Jinnah
- José Rizal (1998) – Filipino historical drama film based on the true story of Filipino patriot José Rizal, who was imprisoned under the Spanish colonization and tells Rizal's story until the final day of his execution
- Lautrec (1998) – French biographical drama film about the painter Henri de Toulouse-Lautrec, focusing on his love affair with painter Suzanne Valadon
- Leaf on a Pillow (Indonesian: Daun di Atas Bantal) (1998) – Indonesian drama film based on true stories in the lives of three street boys in Yogyakarta who all die under tragic circumstances, also dealing with poverty in Indonesia, as seen through the experiences of the poor
- The Long Island Incident (1998) – drama television film about the 1993 Long Island Rail Road shooting.
- Love and Rage (1998) – British-Irish-German drama film about a romantic obsession which turned violent, inspired by a true story and partially filmed in the home where the actual events occurred
- Love Is the Devil: Study for a Portrait of Francis Bacon (1998) – British biographical drama film depicting a biography of painter Francis Bacon, concentrating on his strained relationship with George Dyer, a small-time thief
- Miracle at Midnight (1998) – war drama television film based on the rescue of the Danish Jews in Denmark during the Holocaust
- Mulan (1998) – animated musical adventure film based on the Chinese legend of Hua Mulan
- My Own Country (1998) – drama television film telling the story of Abraham Verghese, a young infectious-disease physician in the mid-1980s in Johnson City, Tennessee, who began to treat patients with a then unknown disease (later identified as AIDS)
- Never Tell Me Never (1998) – Australian biographical drama television film about cross-country skier Janine Shepherd
- The Newton Boys (1998) – Western crime film telling the true story of the Newton Gang, a family of bank and train robbers from Uvalde, Texas
- Nicholas' Gift (1998) – American-Italian drama television film about an American couple on vacation in Italy in 1994 with their two children who are attacked and shot by highway bandits, based on a true story
- Patch Adams (1998) – biographical comedy drama film loosely based on the life story of Dr. Hunter "Patch" Adams
- The Pentagon Wars (1998) – war comedy film about the development of the Bradley Fighting Vehicle
- Permanent Midnight (1998) – drama film about Jerry Stahl, a successful TV writer for popular series like thirtysomething, Twin Peaks, and ALF, and his struggles with substance abuse
- Pocahontas II: Journey to a New World (1998) – animated musical adventure film focusing on Pocahontas's journey to England with John Rolfe to negotiate for peace between the two nations
- Point Last Seen (1998) – action drama television film about a tracker who searches for a little girl who was lost in the desert, but suffers internally because her own children were kidnapped by her ex-husband, based on a true story
- The Prince of Egypt (1998) – animated religious musical drama film following the life of Moses from being a prince of Egypt to a prophet of the Lord, chosen by God to carry out his ultimate destiny of leading the Hebrews out of Egypt
- Psycho (1998) – psychological horror film inspired by the crimes of the real-life serial killer, Ed Gein
- The Rat Pack (1998) – biographical drama television film about the Rat Pack
- Resurrection Man (1998) – Northern Irish extreme horror drama film loosely based on the real-life "Shankill Butchers", an Ulster loyalist gang in 1970s Belfast who conducted random killings of Catholic civilians until their leader, Lenny Murphy, was assassinated by a Provisional IRA hit squad
- Ruby Bridges (1998) – biographical drama television film based on the true story of Ruby Bridges, one of the first black students to attend integrated schools in New Orleans, Louisiana, in 1960
- Sada (Japanese: SADA〜戯作・阿部定の生涯) (1998) – Japanese drama film based on the true story of Sada Abe
- Saving Private Ryan (1998) – epic war drama film inspired by accounts of casualties among members of a single family such as the Niland brothers during World War II
- Savior (1998) – war drama film about a U.S. mercenary escorting a Bosnian Serb woman and her newborn child to a United Nations safe zone during the Bosnian War
- Shot Through the Heart (1998) – war drama television film covering the Siege of Sarajevo during the Bosnian War, based on a true story
- The Sleep Room (1998) – Canadian biographical drama television film about experiments on Canadian mental patients that were carried out in the 1950s and 1960s by Donald Ewen Cameron and funded by the CIA's MKUltra program
- Swami Vivekananda (1998) – Indian biographical drama film about Swami Vivekananda, the 19th-century Hindu monk
- The Temptations (1998) – biographical musical drama miniseries based upon the history of one of Motown's longest-lived acts, The Temptations
- Terra Nova (1998) – Australian drama film based on a young woman who runs away from her home in New Zealand and hides with her child in an Australian boarding house named Terra Nova
- The Thin Red Line (1998) – epic war film depicting a fictionalized version of the Battle of Mount Austen, which was part of the Guadalcanal Campaign in the Pacific Theater of the Second World War
- The Tichborne Claimant (1998) – British drama film based on the Tichborne case, a historical case of identity theft
- The Tiger Woods Story (1998) – biographical sport drama television film about the life of Tiger Woods
- The Versace murder (1998) – biographical crime drama film focusing on the true story of the murder of fashion designer Gianni Versace by alleged serial killer Andrew Cunanan
- Why Do Fools Fall in Love (1998) – romantic drama film about Frankie Lymon, lead singer of the pioneering rock and roll group Frankie Lymon & the Teenagers
- Winchell (1998) – biographical drama television film telling the true story of the influential and controversial columnist, Walter Winchell
- Windhorse (1998) – drama film about the lives of three young Tibetans who struggle for freedom against the Chinese communist regime, based on true events
- Without Limits (1998) – biographical sport drama film following the relationship between record-breaking distance runner Steve Prefontaine and his coach Bill Bowerman, who later co-founded Nike, Inc.
- Witness to the Mob (1998) – crime drama television film following the rise of Sammy Gravano in ranks in the Gambino crime family, one of the "Five Families" of the New York Cosa Nostra that dominates organized crime activities in New York City, his turning to government witness in the legal trials of John Gotti and his life in federal Witness Protection Program
