= Murder of Jaclyn Dowaliby =

Child murder victim

Jaclyn Dowaliby
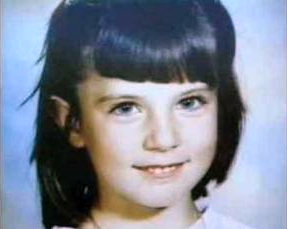
- Jaclyn Dowaliby, c. 1988
- Born: Jaclyn Marie Guess; May 17, 1981; Chicago, Illinois, U.S.
- Died: September 10, 1988 (aged 7); Illinois, U.S.
- Cause of death: Ligature strangulation
- Body discovered: September 14, 1988; Blue Island, Illinois
- Resting place: Saint Mary Catholic Cemetery and Mausoleum, Evergreen Park, Cook County, Illinois; 41.73170°N 87.71640°W (approximate)
- Occupation: Student
- Known for: Victim of unsolved child murder
- Height: 4 ft 0 in (1.22 m)

The murder of Jaclyn Marie Dowaliby is an unsolved child murder which occurred in Midlothian, Illinois, on September 10, 1988, when a seven-year-old girl was abducted from her bedroom and murdered by an unknown individual or individuals. Her strangled body was discovered in a section of wasteland in Blue Island four days later.

Dowaliby's mother and stepfather were tried for her murder in 1990; her mother was acquitted, although her adoptive father, David Dowaliby, was convicted of her murder and sentenced to 45 years' imprisonment. His conviction was later overturned, and he was released from prison in November 1991. The case remains unsolved, and has been described as one of Metropolitan Chicago's most infamous cold cases.

== Early life ==
Jaclyn Dowaliby was born on May 17, 1981 in Chicago, Illinois, the first and only child born to James "Jimmy" and Cynthia Guess. The couple had met in the 1970s at a skating rink where Jaclyn's father worked when her mother was a teenager and her father in his early 20s; the two began a relationship which lasted for seven years but mutually separated shortly before Jaclyn's birth. Shortly thereafter, Jaclyn's parents engaged in a bitter feud over custody of her, which Cynthia ultimately won. (Note: Shortly after losing his custody battle, James Guess relocated from Illinois to Florida, where he found employment in the construction industry.)

In approximately 1982, Jaclyn's mother became acquainted with David Dowaliby, whom she married when her daughter was two years old. Six months after their wedding, David Dowaliby legally adopted Jaclyn, who viewed Dowaliby as her father and—having never seen her father since infancy—reportedly believed him to be so. One year later, in 1984, her half-brother, David Jr., was born. The family were observed to be loving and close-knit, with one neighbor recollecting: "They were a loving family; they were always hugging their kids ... they never yelled at them. They never even spanked them; they'd send them to their rooms or take away their bikes. They didn't believe in corporal punishment."

Jaclyn has been described as a happy, "bubbly" and content child who enjoyed playing with dolls and was popular among her peers at Central Park Elementary School. Her mother worked within the dietary department at Oak Forest Hospital, and her stepfather as a construction foreman at Rax Erecting Service.

By 1988, the family resided in a one-story ranch-style home on 148th Street in a middle-class section of Midlothian, Illinois, surrounded by several nature reserves. (Note: The United States census records the population of Midlothian in 1980 as being 14,474 persons.) The house was owned by David Dowaliby's mother, Anna, who also resided at the residence and who slept in a basement bedroom. That summer, Cynthia discovered she was pregnant with her third child.

== September 9–10, 1988 ==
On the afternoon of September 9, 1988, Cynthia took her two children to a local Kentucky Fried Chicken for dinner while her husband visited a Blue Island bowling alley with some friends. He returned home at 9:20 p.m. to observe his wife and children at home with two family members, who both left the household shortly thereafter. (Note: The second of these two individuals to leave the premises was David Dowaliby's mother, Anna, who would later state she left the household via the rear door to visit an Oak Forest restaurant at 10:30 p.m. She later testified she ensured the door was locked when she left the premises.)

At 10:30 p.m. that evening, Jaclyn—then seven years old—dressed in her nightgown and kissed her mother goodnight before climbing into her bed with a Sears catalog, which she began reading. (Note: According to her mother, although Christmas was three months away, Jaclyn was excited about the upcoming occasion and intended to circle items within the catalog she was going to "ask Santa" to bring to her.) Her stepfather retired to bed at approximately the same time.

At approximately 11 p.m., Jaclyn's mother checked on her daughter, only to observe her sound asleep in her bed; Cynthia switched off the light in her daughter's bedroom and went to sleep herself, leaving both her children's bedroom doors slightly ajar. Both parents remained adamant they slept soundly throughout the night and heard nothing untoward.

=== Abduction ===
At 8 a.m. on September 10, David Dowaliby awoke. According to statements given to police, he was surprised not to observe Jaclyn already awake and watching cartoons in the living room. Upon checking her bedroom, David noted the child was neither asleep or playing with toys upon her bedroom floor, although he did observe an open suitcase—which Jaclyn occasionally played with—lying on her bed and her dresser drawers open, with items of her clothing in disarray. With the exception of the child's blanket, nothing was missing from her bedroom.

Initially, David assumed Jaclyn may be playing outside with a friend and sat to watch cartoons with his son. One hour later, he woke Cynthia by bringing her a cup of coffee and remarked his belief Jaclyn was playing outside; Cynthia rapidly became alarmed at her daughter's absence.

A search of the house revealed no trace of Jaclyn, although the Dowalibys did note the kitchen door to their property—typically locked at nights—was slightly ajar. (Note: David Dowaliby had observed the front door of the property was slightly ajar after he had awoken; he had initially assumed his mother had inadvertently left the door open when she had left the property the previous evening.) After briefly checking at a neighbor's home to inquire if Jaclyn was playing with a friend, David and Cynthia Dowaliby returned to their home only to observe en route that the screen door to a basement window had been cut or torn open and the window itself had been smashed, through which an individual had evidently unlatched the window as a potential point of entry to the property. (Note: At twenty-four inches in width and eighteen inches in height, this basement window was large enough for a slender adult to crawl through.) The Dowalibys then reported their daughter as missing to the Midlothian Police Department.

== Investigation ==
Midlothian Police immediately launched an intense search to locate the child. This extensive search of local terrain involved the usage of all-terrain vehicles and search and rescue dogs. Officers were assisted in their search of areas of interest by local firefighters and numerous civilian volunteers, and an underwater search and recovery unit would dredge a swamp located a block from the Dowaliby household. The U.S. Coast Guard also conducted an aerial search for the child, to no avail. In addition, numerous missing persons flyers were distributed throughout Cook County (Note: These flyers described Jaclyn as being 4 feet 0 inches (1.22 m) in height, weighing 60 pounds and with shoulder-length brown hair and blue eyes.) and friends and neighbors of the family tied numerous yellow ribbons to oak trees upon the streets surrounding the Dowaliby household in symbolic gestures of hope and solidarity.

A forensic examination of the house itself yielded few clues, although an examination of the broken basement window revealed an even layer of dust on the windowsill inside the home and no recently deposited hairs or fibers upon this surface, indicating the intruder or intruders had not entered the premises via this method; however, a smudge described as being an "indeterminate mark on the wall" was discovered directly beneath this window. (Note: Investigators would later determine this window had been broken from the outside as opposed to the inside. Furthermore, the window had been punctured to minimize any noise and the perpetrator had evidently removed large sections of the glass pane and placed them on the grass.) Both this smudge and other smear marks noted upon the front door to the property were unsuitable to enable the lifting of fingerprints.

Beyond the damaged window, the child's missing blanket and mild disarray in her bedroom—located directly opposite her parents' room—the house bore few signs of a forced entry, although a forensic examination of Jaclyn's pillow did reveal a human hair described in police reports as originating from a black individual. The parents were both adamant that they had heard nothing untoward the evening prior, and questioning of neighbors revealed they too had seen and heard nothing untoward in the early hours of September 10. The broken basement window was located far from Jaclyn's bedroom, and any kidnapper entering via this method would evidently have to then walk up the stairs and down a hallway with markedly squeaky floorboards to enter the child's bedroom. These factors led investigators to believe the perpetrator may have been familiar with the layout of the household.

=== Initial theories ===
As Jaclyn's biological father is known to have once attempted to break into the Dowaliby household to kidnap his daughter following his failure to secure custody of her, James Guess became a prime suspect in her abduction; however, police soon discounted him as a suspect upon learning he had been imprisoned in Florida since May 23, having been sentenced to seven years' imprisonment upon two counts of sexual battery, one count of threatening another with a deadly weapon, and one count of attempted sexual battery.

Initially, a police spokesman confirmed the likelihood Jaclyn had been the victim of a kidnapping, with her abductor or abductors most likely leaving the house with the child via the kitchen door, (Note: On the morning of Jaclyn's abduction, David Dowaliby informed investigators he and Cynthia had installed a sliding bolt lock three inches from the top of this door to prevent their children from leaving the house without their knowledge or permission.) although authorities stated they maintained an open mind as to the actual motive behind her disappearance; however, as no ransom demands were made, the day after Jaclyn's abduction, state and local authorities requested the FBI become involved in the manhunt to locate the child.

In the days immediately following their daughter's abduction, the Dowalibys willingly submitted to any police requests to assist in their ongoing investigation. On September 13, David Dowaliby was asked to undergo a polygraph test, to which he agreed. The polygraph test was conducted in Chicago, and according to David, he was informed by the FBI that the examination indicated the truthfulness of his answers.

=== Discovery ===
At approximately 5:45 p.m. on September 14, 1988, a man named Michael Chatman discovered Jaclyn's body discarded upon a section of wasteland close to a garbage receptacle serving a small apartment complex named the Islander Apartments within the city of Blue Island, approximately 6 mi (9.7 km) from her home. The body lay in a section of brush at the edge of a small wooded area overlooking the Calumet River. Chatman would later state that upon parking his vehicle, he had become suspicious of a putrid odor and, upon investigation, noted a head and arm protruding from a purple and white blanket which concealed her entire body beneath the upper torso. The body was transported to the Cook County Medical Examiner's office, and was formally identified via dental records the following day.

An autopsy conducted by Dr. Robert Stein revealed Jaclyn had been strangled with a two-foot section of twine which was still knotted around her neck. Her body was dressed in her purple nightgown, although her underwear had been removed and discarded close to her body. Both weathering and maggot predation prevented a detailed forensic examination of the child's clothing, although a single hair of Caucasian origin was discovered inside her underwear and a single hair sourcing from a black individual was discovered upon the section of twine around the child's neck. Furthermore, her fingernails bore traces of type O blood; this blood type was shared by Jaclyn and all her immediate family with the exception of David Sr., whose blood type was type A.

Due to the extensive decomposition of Jaclyn's body, Dr. Stein was unable to determine if the child had been subjected to a sexual assault prior to or after her death, although he was unable to discount the possibility. Furthermore, the advanced decomposition and maggot infestation of her remains led Stein to estimate that Jaclyn had most likely been murdered sometime in the morning of September 10.

== Further inquiries ==
Prior to the discovery of Jaclyn's body, and after eliminating her biological father as a suspect, investigators had pursued two leads of investigation: that the child had been kidnapped in a non-family abduction; or that one or both of her parents had been responsible. The fact that the dust upon the basement windowsill had been undisturbed and the intruder had evidently not entered the property via this method led investigators to presume the break-in via the basement window had been staged. The day the child's body was discovered, David was again called into the police station to submit to a polygraph test; on this occasion, he was informed the results were inconclusive. Midway through a five-hour interrogation, David was informed the body of a young girl had been discovered at Blue Island. Cynthia herself was answering questions from two police officers at her home when she received news of the discovery; she collapsed and wept.

=== Eyewitness sighting ===
Police questioning of residents of the Islander Apartments produced an eyewitness named Everett Mann, who informed investigators on September 16 that at approximately 2 a.m. on September 10, he had observed a "dark colored" Chevrolet Malibu parked close to the garbage receptacle where Jaclyn's body was discovered. His attention had been drawn to this vehicle when the driver had switched on the headlights of the car as Mann himself parked his own vehicle.

Mann was uncertain as to the actual color of the vehicle, which he described to investigators as being "dark blue, navy blue, black, or dark brown"; however, he later positively identified a photograph of David Dowaliby within a police lineup as the individual he had seen within the vehicle. His identification was based largely upon David's distinctive nasal bridge being similar to that of the driver of the vehicle.

On September 17, following a Mass held within St. Christopher's Church attended by over two hundred mourners, Jaclyn was laid to rest within Saint Mary Catholic Cemetery and Mausoleum in Evergreen Park. Two days later, police again searched the Dowaliby household. Numerous items were confiscated in this search in addition to the family car—a light blue Chevrolet Malibu, which was subjected to a detailed forensic examination. This examination yielded several strands of human hair believed to source from Jaclyn, but no conclusive evidence that the vehicle had been used to transport a human body. Shortly thereafter, the Dowalibys retained two lawyers named Ralph Meczyk and Lawrence Hyman, who instructed the couple to refuse to speak with investigators unless they advised them to. Shortly thereafter, based upon what was described to the press as "excellent evidence", both Dowalibys were arrested and charged with the first-degree murder of their daughter. Both were denied bail, and David Jr. was placed in temporary foster care before being placed in the care of an aunt and uncle.

=== Formal charges ===
On November 22, 1988, David and Cynthia were arrested and charged with the murder of their daughter. David was arrested as he drove to his place of work; Cynthia was arrested within her home. A grand jury indicted Cynthia and David Dowaliby the following day, attesting that the couple had murdered Jaclyn and attempted to conceal the homicide. The evidence produced at this hearing was Mann's purported identification of David in the early hours of September 10 close to the garbage receptacle where her body had been discovered four days later, and initial testimony indicating the basement window of the Dowaliby household had been broken from the inside as opposed to the outside. Both were arrested and formally charged, but subsequently released on bond on successive days the following month, to await trial. The bond fees for both were raised by family and friends, who remained steadfast in their belief of the Dowalibys' innocence. (Note: The trial date was postponed in order that Cynthia Dowaliby—three months pregnant at the time of her arrest—could give birth to her third child.)

=== Further forensic developments ===
The day following the Dowalibys' indictment, a renewed forensic report ruled that concentric breaks and stress marks evident upon the basement window indicated the glass had actually been broken from the outside, with the perpetrator having punctured the pane to reduce shattering sounds before removing several large sections of glass and carefully laying them on the ground.

Cynthia gave birth to her third child in the spring of 1989 and named her daughter Carli. With her consent, the child was placed in the guardianship of her parents prior to the upcoming trial.

== Trial ==
The trial of David and Cynthia Dowaliby began on April 5, 1990. The couple were jointly tried in Cook County before Cook County Circuit Court Judge Richard E. Neville. The prosecutors were Patrick O'Brien and George Velcich; Cynthia was defended by Lawrence Hyman, and David by Ralph Meczyk. Upon advice from their respective counsels, neither defendant testified throughout the trial.

In their opening statement to the jury, the prosecution contended both parents were guilty of the strangulation murder of their daughter and the concealment of her homicide, with both also attempting to conceal their crime by staging the abduction of their child and emphasizing investigators had found no evidence of forced entry to the property. These contentions were refuted by their attorneys in their respective opening statements, with David's attorney, Ralph Meczyk, stating: "So bizarre, so strange, so hellish that the mother and father who loved that child would be charged with her murder." Both also referenced the lack of evidence against their clients.

=== Witness testimony ===
The primary prosecution witness to testify at the Dowalibys' trial was eyewitness Everett Mann, who testified to having witnessed a silhouetted Caucasian person he believed to be a man, with a prominent nasal bridge, sitting inside a parked car from a distance of seventy-five yards at approximately 2 a.m. on September 10 before the vehicle drove away from the scene. Mann testified that the vehicle was parked close to the site where Jaclyn's body was discovered four days later.

Upon cross-examination, Mann conceded he had originally described the vehicle he had seen as being a "late 1970s model" Chevrolet Malibu, possibly dark blue in color, whereas the Dowalibys owned a light blue 1980 model Chevrolet Malibu, which was markedly different in design to 1970s models of the vehicle; he also conceded the fact that the illumination of the parking lot at this time limited his vision and that he was unable to conclusively determine whether the person was either male or female or black or white, although in rebuttal, the prosecution reiterated to the jury that Mann had picked David's image out of a police lineup.

Two other witnesses to deliver eyewitness testimony at trial were individuals who claimed to have observed Cynthia's vehicle close to the site where Jaclyn's body was recovered; however, two neighbors later contradicted this testimony by testifying Cynthia's vehicle had been parked outside her household at the time they claimed to have observed her vehicle at Blue Island. One of these witnesses was their next-door neighbor, Holly Deck, who stated upon oath she had woken at approximately 2:10 a.m. on September 10 to visit her bathroom and, upon entering her kitchen thereafter, she had observed the Dowalibys' Malibu from her kitchen window as she drank a glass of water.

The primary physical evidence presented at trial was the rope used to strangle Jaclyn. A neighborhood friend of the Dowaliby children, Jeffrey Kolaczek, testified he had seen David Jr. playing with "the same type" of rope used to strangle Jaclyn and that, following her abduction and murder, he had never again seen David Jr. doing so. Also to testify regarding the section of rope was Anna Dowaliby, who contradicted earlier testimony to investigators to having seen a similar type of rope within the household but maintained at trial she had previously been mistaken as to this testimony. In rebuttal, the Dowalibys' defense attorneys attacked the credibility of Kolaczek's testimony by emphasizing the vagueness of his testimony while also citing Kolaczek's age and maintaining that even if the rope had sourced from the Dowaliby household, the perpetrator could well have taken the item to restrain and murder Jaclyn.

Also of focus and presented into evidence was a bloodstained pillow recovered from Jaclyn's bedroom and human hair found in the Dowalibys' vehicle believed to be hers; this evidence was refuted by the defense as typing was unable to identify the source of the blood and the hair samples were not classified as sourcing from Jaclyn.

== Verdicts ==
=== Acquittal of Cynthia Dowaliby ===
The Dowalibys' trial saw over forty witnesses and almost two hundred exhibits presented into evidence. Shortly prior to the trial's conclusion, Judge Neville conferred privately with both counsels and stated that insufficient evidence existed against Cynthia, but the case against David would continue. As such, Cynthia was formally acquitted on May 2.

=== Conviction of David Dowaliby ===
David was convicted of Jaclyn's murder on May 3, 1990, the jury having deliberated for three days before reaching their verdict. He was formally sentenced to serve consecutive terms of forty years for her murder and an additional five years for concealing a homicide on July 10.

Immediately prior to Judge Neville imposing sentence, David again professed his innocence before stating he would always love Jaclyn "forever in my heart."

== Overturning of conviction ==
In October 1991, an appellate court unanimously overturned David Dowaliby's conviction, ruling that the evidence presented against him at trial had been as insufficient to secure his conviction as that presented against his wife and that David's conviction could not be sustained based solely upon evidence that he had had the opportunity to commit the offense simply because he and his wife were the only adults in the house on the night of Jaclyn's abduction.

Upon receipt of these developments, Cook County State's Attorney Jack O'Malley announced his intentions to appeal this decision to the Illinois Supreme Court; these objections were overruled on November 11, with the Supreme Court ruling that David—then aged 34—be released from prison upon a $400,000 bond. This bond was posted on November 13.

"Dear Jaclyn,

I knew you wanted to be a cheerleader and a mother. I loved and cared about you. I loved how you always wanted to wear a dress or a skirt to school. You were a beautiful roller skater and bike rider; you were a friend to everyone. We were so sad when we couldn't find you ... our hearts cried out for you every day. I will never give up on you, Jaclyn. I'm sorry this happened to you. You will still be a cheerleader and anything else you ever wanted to be in life in my heart."

— David Dowaliby Sr.'s eulogy, recited at Jaclyn's funeral, September 17, 1988.

On the date of his release, David Dowaliby informed the press that the fact he had been released would take "a while" to "sink in." Cynthia (then aged 29) also stated: "I can feel Jaclyn [is] with us right now ... it's been a real struggle, and I feel real good. I hope it ends soon."

== Aftermath ==
One year after her acquittal, on March 11, 1991, Cynthia Dowaliby regained custody of her two surviving children. She was awarded custody by Judge Robert Smierciak. Upon learning of this ruling, Cynthia informed reporters: "Now it's the freedom. Now I'm back to normal." She also vowed to continue to fight for her husband's release. Upon his release, David Dowaliby returned to live with his wife and two children. The couple subsequently changed their names, and have since refused to respond to media requests for interviews.

On January 4, 1993, a spokesman for the Cook County State's Attorney announced that prosecutors were actively reviewing new evidence indicating the possibility that Jaclyn's paternal uncle Timothy Randall Guess—a known mentally ill individual—may have been the perpetrator of her abduction and murder, although this individual refused to comment whether the investigation had actually been reopened. No significant developments pertaining to this line of inquiry ensued.

Timothy Guess died of bladder cancer in December 2002 at the age of 41.

No other individual has ever been arrested for, or convicted of, Jaclyn's abduction and murder. Her murder remains unsolved.

== Media ==
=== Bibliography ===
- Protess, David; Warden, Robert (1994). Gone in the Night: The Dowaliby Family's Encounter with Murder and the Law. New York: Dell Publishing. ISBN 978-0-440-21243-0.
- Thompson, Emily G. (2018). Unsolved Child Murders: Eighteen American Cases, 1956–1998. North Carolina: McFarland & Company Inc. ISBN 978-1-476-67000-3.

=== Documentary ===
- NBC has commissioned an episode focusing upon the abduction and murder of Jaclyn Dowaliby as part of their documentary series Unsolved Mysteries. Hosted by Robert Stack, the episode features interviews with the Dowalibys in addition to investigators and defense attorneys assigned to the case and was first broadcast on November 18, 1992.

=== Television ===
- The made-for-TV film Gone in the Night was released in 1996. Directly based upon Jaclyn Dowaliby's disappearance and murder and starring Kevin Dillon and Shannen Doherty as David and Cynthia Dowaliby, the film concludes with actual footage of David and Cynthia in a public service announcement (PSA) event for the National Center for Missing and Exploited Children.

== See also ==
- Child abduction
- Cold case
- List of homicides in Illinois
- List of solved missing person cases: 1950–1999
- List of unsolved murders (1980–1999)
- National Center for Missing & Exploited Children
- Miscarriage of justice
