= Sherri Chessen =

American actress and thalidomide victim (born 1932)

Sherri Chessen (born 1932), also known as Sherri Finkbine, is an American former children's television host. She is also known as Miss Sherri, her role on the Phoenix version of the franchised children's show Romper Room. In 1962, Chessen became a subject of controversy when she sought an abortion after discovering that the thalidomide she had been taking caused serious fetal deformities when used in the early stages of pregnancy.

== Abortion controversy ==
In 1961, Chessen's husband, Bob Finkbine, chaperoned a group of high school students on a European tour, where he purchased over-the-counter sedatives and brought the remainder home. Chessen took 36 of the pills in the early stages of her fifth pregnancy, unaware that they contained thalidomide, which could cause deformity in the fetus. Her physician recommended that she obtain a therapeutic abortion, the only type permitted in Arizona at the time. To publicize the danger of thalidomide, Chessen contacted the Arizona Republic. Although she was assured anonymity, her identity was not kept secret. The media identified her as "Mrs. Robert L. Finkbine" and "Sherri Finkbine", even though she personally did not use that name.

Following the paper's publication of Chessen's story, the hospital where she planned to have the abortion, wary of the publicity, sought assurance that it would not be prosecuted. When such assurance was not forthcoming, the scheduled abortion was canceled. When her physician asked for a court order to proceed with the abortion, she and her husband became public figures, receiving letters and phone calls in opposition to her requested abortion. A few letters included death threats, and the FBI was brought in to protect her. She also lost her job hosting Romper Room. Chessen's case was dismissed by Judge Yale McFate, who found that he did not have the authority to decide on the matter.

The controversy became the basis for a made-for-TV movie in 1992, A Private Matter, with Sissy Spacek in the leading role.

== Swedish abortion ==
Chessen attempted to go to Japan to obtain an abortion, but was denied a visa by the Japanese Consul. She and her husband then flew to Sweden, where she obtained a successful and legal abortion, which caused a minor controversy. The abortion panel of the Royal Swedish Medical Board granted Chessen's request for an abortion on August 17, 1962, to safeguard her mental health. The operation was performed the following day.

The Swedish obstetrician who performed the abortion told Chessen that the fetus had no legs and only one arm and would not have survived. The doctor stated that the fetus was too badly deformed to identify gender. In 1965, Chessen had another baby, a healthy girl.

== Impact ==
The termination of Chessen's pregnancy is seen now as a pivotal event in the history of abortion rights in the United States. According to history professor Mary Frances Berry, her story "helped change public opinion [on abortion]. Fifty-two percent of respondents in a Gallup poll thought she had done the right thing." By 1965, Berry continues, "most Americans, 77 percent, wanted abortion legalized 'where the health of the mother is in danger'"; in that same year, The New York Times called for reform of abortion laws. Planned Parenthood wrote that Chessen was able to afford to go overseas to have the abortion, but many other women seeking to terminate unwanted pregnancies would turn to illegal abortions.

Lee Epstein, a professor of law and political science, wrote that "Finkbine's situation evoked sympathetic reactions from various organizations and, in essence, led to the creation of an American abortion reform movement."

== Later ==
Chessen has six children from her first marriage with Robert Finkbine. The couple divorced in 1973. Chessen married David Pent in 1991. Pent died in 2002.

From September to December 1970, Chessen had her own one-hour variety show on KPAZ in Phoenix. In the 1990s, she did voice acting for cartoons and wrote two children's books to address the issues of gun violence and bullying.

After the Supreme Court overturned Roe v. Wade in June 2022 Chessen gave an interview to CBS News Sunday Morning, almost 60 years after her own abortion. In the interview, she characterized herself as pro-choice and anti-abortion, saying that abortions are quite awful, but that "We can't go back to willow sticks and knitting needles and all the things that women have perforated their uteruses with."
