= Phillip Hutchinson =

American bank robber (1963–1988)

- Mugshot of Phillip Hutchinson
- Born: Phillip L. Hutchinson; March 19, 1963; Arlington County, Virginia, U.S.
- Died: February 9, 1988 (aged 24); Denver, Colorado, U.S.
- Cause of death: Gunshot wounds

Phillip La Force Hutchinson (March 19, 1963 – February 9, 1988) was an American bank robber and escaped convict, known for a 1988 bank robbery and hostage crisis in Denver, Colorado. While fleeing the robbery in his getaway vehicle, he killed police officer Bob Wallis and kidnapped a man as a hostage, engaging in a car chase with police and a news helicopter in one of the first recorded police chases. Hutchinson was eventually stopped when the pilot of the news helicopter blocked his vehicle; Hutchinson was then shot dead by police when they surrounded him. A 1991 television film, The Chase, was based on his crime spree.

== Biography ==
Hutchinson was born in Arlington County, Virginia on March 19, 1963. He was described by authorities as a career criminal and was an escaped convict. Prior to the Denver bank robbery, he was serving a life sentence for an aggravated robbery in Ferguson Unit, a men's prison in Texas. According to the Texas Department of Corrections, he had escaped from prison on July 31, 1987, along with another inmate, by stealing a truck while on work detail. Hutchinson's criminal record included ransom kidnapping, two prison escapes, and desertion from the U.S. Marine Corps. Authorities also believe he may have been involved in four other bank robberies in the Denver area.

== Bank robbery and hostage-taking ==
On February 9, 1988, at around 11:20 a.m., Hutchinson entered the Rio Grande Operating Credit Union office in north Denver, armed with a .357 Magnum revolver, and robbed the 18-year-old teller at gunpoint for approximately $3,000. Hutchinson put the money in a suitcase and fled the scene, but the teller saw his vehicle, a brown Chevrolet K5 Blazer, and called 9-1-1 to alert the Denver Police Department. Police managed to quickly identify and intercept the vehicle, but Hutchinson refused to stop, traveling at speeds of up to 60 or 80 miles per hour, forcing several vehicles off the road, and making multiple intentional near-misses with oncoming police cruisers. A KCNC-TV news helicopter, flown by pilot Mike Silva and carrying cameraman Jim Stair, was filming aerial shots for a newscast about highway construction when it was informed of the incident; Silva opted to join the pursuit, with Stair filming Hutchinson's vehicle as it fled.

Hutchinson fled northbound on Tennyson Street and headed directly toward an unmarked cruiser that was attempting to block the road in front of him. The two detectives (Detective Robert "Bob" Wallis and Sgt. Russell Parisi) inside the cruiser attempted to escape, but 51-year-old Wallis was struck by Hutchinson while exiting the cruiser. Wallis' body was sent flying approximately 130 feet from the impact, killing him instantly and forcing the pursuing officers to stop. With the police no longer chasing him, Hutchinson continued to drive away, but Silva and Stair followed him. The two, unable to directly communicate with the Denver PD, called the KCNC studio and told them to call 9-1-1 and relay information between them, allowing them to communicate with the police, albeit with a delay of roughly one or two minutes.

After cutting a corner at an intersection, Hutchinson lost control of the Blazer and crashed into a tree. With his vehicle disabled, Hutchinson fled on foot with the suitcase and handgun, running through several yards and crossing Denver city limits into Adams County. Reaching an apartment building, Hutchinson tried to stop a leaving vehicle in the parking lot before turning his attention to Mary Ann Barbre and her 14-month-old son Devin in a blue car. He attempted to hijack the vehicle and use them as hostages, but the woman drove off upon seeing his gun; Hutchinson fired at the car, hitting it but missing the occupants. Hutchinson then ran into a nearby trailer park, where he looked up at the news helicopter and aimed at it, apparently in an attempt to threaten Silva and Stair and force them to withdraw; however, while they took cover, they did not leave.

Hutchinson eventually reached a house where he encountered 73-year-old John Laurienti and his granddaughter in the driveway. Though Laurienti's granddaughter managed to escape, Laurienti was forced at gunpoint to drive him away in his green Chevrolet C/K. Hutchinson threatened to kill Laurienti if he made any attempt to alert the police of his presence; to avoid detection, Hutchinson hid below the dashboard, and Laurienti drove slowly, allowing them to pass a police car without incident.

By this point, only Silva and Stair knew of Hutchinson's location and new vehicle, and they attempted to alert the Denver PD using their link at the KCNC studio, but there were significant delays due to the message having to be relayed by staff at the studio. Realizing the danger of Hutchinson escaping and potentially killing Laurienti, and noticing heavy traffic at a busy street up ahead, Silva decided he had to stop the pursuit himself. Dropping the news helicopter to hover three feet above the ground, Silva maneuvered the helicopter below power lines and cut off the C/K, forcing it to stop. Hutchinson ordered Laurienti to ram the helicopter, but after hesitating, Hutchinson aimed his gun at the helicopter and prepared to fire. Suddenly, Officer Roger Prince arrived at the scene and rammed his cruiser into the front-right wheel of the C/K, immobilizing it; around a dozen additional police officers also arrived to block in the C/K. Silva landed the helicopter nearby, while Stair disembarked from the helicopter and filmed the officers on foot as they surrounded Hutchinson.

== Death ==
Police officers surrounding Hutchinson in his hijacked pickup truck and opening fire

Surrounded by police, Hutchinson grabbed Laurienti in a headlock and held him at gunpoint. Ignoring orders to stop moving, Hutchinson began looking around at the officers behind him; each time he did, he would bring his gun away from Laurienti's head. When he did this three times, officers opened fire, shooting Hutchinson multiple times. Laurienti was unharmed and was pulled from the truck by officers. Stair arrived right as officers opened fire and caught Hutchinson's death on camera.

Hutchinson died at the scene, at the age of 24. He was buried in Round Rock, Texas.

== Aftermath and legacy ==
A Denver PD investigation determined the officers' use of lethal force was justified and necessary.

Silva was criticized for his actions during the pursuit, which potentially put the lives of himself, Stair, and anyone on the ground in danger. The Federal Aviation Administration (FAA) also investigated whether he breached aviation laws. However, the Denver PD and the KCNC-TV director praised him as a hero whose actions prevented Hutchinson's escape, and the FAA ultimately cleared Silva of wrongdoing.

The car chase and footage of Hutchinson's death widely reported in the media and have been featured in many television documentaries. Footage of the pursuit and his death was featured in World's Wildest Police Videos, Police Stop!, Rescue 911, and the 1993 mondo film Traces of Death.

The 1991 film The Chase, directed by Paul Wendkos, adapted the incident. Hutchinson was played by film actor Casey Siemaszko. Also starring in the film was Ben Johnson as Laurienti, Robert Beltran as Silva, and Barry Corbin as Wallis.
