= List of 1999 films based on actual events =

This is a list of films and miniseries released in 1999 that are based on actual events. All films on this list are from American production unless indicated otherwise.

== 1999 ==
- The 13th Warrior (1999) – historical action drama film depicting a loose adaptation of the tale of Beowulf combined with Ahmad ibn Fadlan's historical account of the Volga Vikings
- A Respectable Man (Italian: Un uomo perbene) (1999) – Italian biographical drama film depicting the judicial case of television presenter Enzo Tortora, who was falsely accused by several pentiti to be a camorra man and who died of cancer a short time after being acquitted
- Aimée & Jaguar (1999) – German war drama film chronicling the actual lives of Lilly Wust and Felice Schragenheim during World War II
- All My Loved Ones (Czech: Všichni moji blízcí) (1999) – Czech-Polish-Slovak war drama film about Nicholas Winton and the Czech Kindertransport
- All the King's Men (1999) – British war drama television film based on the story of the 1/5th (Territorial) Battalion of the Norfolk Regiment which included men from the King's estate at Sandringham House who had initially been formed in a "Sandringham Company"
- Angela's Ashes (1999) – biographical drama film based on the memoir of the same name by Frank McCourt following the experiences of young Frankie and his family as they try against all odds to escape the poverty endemic in the slums of pre-war Limerick
- Anna and the King (1999) – biographical historical drama film giving a fictionalized account of the diaries of Anna Leonowens
- Aristocrats (1999) – British-Irish-American historical drama miniseries about the four aristocratic Lennox sisters in 18th century England
- At First Sight (1999) – romantic drama film inspired by the true life story of Shirl Jennings
- Bad Company (French: Mauvaises Fréquentations) (1999) – French romantic drama film about an innocent 14-year-old girl ends up prostituting herself (and her best friend) for her tortured, disturbed boyfriend, in the name of love, based on a true story
- Beefcake (1999) – biographical drama film about the muscle magazines of the 1940s, 1950s, and 1960s—in particular, Physique Pictorial magazine, published quarterly by Bob Mizer of the Athletic Model Guild.
- Beyond the Prairie: The True Story of Laura Ingalls Wilder (1999) – biographical Western miniseries about the life of Laura Ingalls Wilder
- Bhopal Express (Hindi: भोपाल एक्सप्रेस) (1999) – Indian Hindi-language drama film set against the gas tragedy in Bhopal, India, in 1984, and examines the irresponsible methods of large corporations and the effects of their actions on common people
- The Blonde Bombshell (1999) – British biographical drama miniseries based on the life and death of actress Diana Dors
- Boys Don't Cry (1999) – biographical drama film depicting a dramatization of the real-life story of Brandon Teena, an American trans man who attempts to find himself and love in Nebraska but falls victim to a brutal hate crime perpetrated by two male acquaintances
- Bravo Two Zero (1999) – British war drama film covering real life events – from the perspective of Andy McNab, patrol commander of Bravo Two Zero, a British SAS patrol, tasked to find Iraqi Scud missile launchers during the Gulf War in 1991
- Breaking Out (Swedish: Vägen ut) (1999) – Swedish comedy drama film inspired by the true event when Jan Jönson directed Samuel Beckett's "Waiting for Godot" at Kumla Prison and took the ensemble of inmates to Gothenburg City Theatre for an official opening performance, whereby four out of five of the inmates escaped
- Brotherhood of Murder (1999) – crime thriller television film based on the white supremacist group The Order, its founder Robert Jay Mathews, and the largest cash robbery in US history
- Children of the Century (French: Les Enfants du Siècle) (1999) – French biographical romance drama film based on the true tale of the tumultuous love affair between two French literary icons of the 19th century, novelist George Sand and poet Alfred de Musset
- Cleopatra (1999) – historical drama miniseries detailing the purported life of Cleopatra VII, Queen of Egypt
- Come On Get Happy: The Partridge Family Story (1999) – biographical drama television film about the 1970–1974 television series The Partridge Family, focusing on star David Cassidy and co-star Danny Bonaduce through the four years the show was on
- Cradle Will Rock (1999) – historical drama film fictionalizing the true events that surrounded the development of the 1937 musical The Cradle Will Rock by Marc Blitzstein
- Crime in Connecticut: The Story of Alex Kelly (1999) – Canadian crime drama television film based on the life of Alex Kelly
- The Cup (Tibetan: ཕོར་པ།) (1999) – Bhutanese sport comedy film about two young football-crazed Tibetan refugee novice monks in a remote Himalayan monastery in India who desperately try to obtain a television for the monastery to watch the 1998 World Cup final, based on a true story
- The Debt (Polish: Dług) (1999) – Polish thriller film based on the true story of Sławomir Sikora and Artur Bryliński in the early 1990s
- Dockers (1999) – British drama television film about the struggles of a small group of Liverpool dockers who were sacked and subsequently spent nearly 2 1/2 years picketing during the Liverpool Dockers' Strike of 1995 to 1998
- The Einstein of Sex (German: Der Einstein des Sex) (1999) – German biographical drama film following the life of the Jewish doctor, sexologist, and gay socialist Magnus Hirschfeld
- Esther (1999) – American-Italian-German Christian drama television film telling the biblical story of Esther
- Excellent Cadavers (Italian: I giudici) (1999) – American-Italian crime drama television film telling the real life events of judge Giovanni Falcone
- General Sutter (1999) – Swiss historical drama film based on the life of John August Sutter, a German-born Swiss figure who participated in the American gold rush in the years before the American Civil War
- Girl, Interrupted (1999) – psychological drama film following a young woman who spends 18 months institutionalized at a psychiatric hospital following a suicide attempt, based on Susanna Kaysen's account of her 18-month stay at a psychiatric hospital in the late 1960s
- Goya in Bordeaux (Spanish: Goya en Burdeos) (1999) – Spanish historical drama film about the life of Francisco Goya, the Spanish painter
- Grey Owl (1999) – American-Canadian-British biographical drama film about the real-life British schoolboy turned Native American trapper "Grey Owl", Archibald Belaney
- Guardami (1999) – Italian erotic thriller drama film loosely based on the life of Moana Pozzi
- Hefner: Unauthorized (1999) – biographical drama film about Hugh Hefner and the birth of the Playboy empire
- The Hunley (1999) – historical drama television film based on the true story of the H. L. Hunley submarine and the action of 17 February 1864
- The Hunt for the Unicorn Killer (1999) – thriller drama miniseries depicting an account of early-1970s social activist Ira Einhorn, who murdered his girlfriend and then fled the country
- The Hurricane (1999) – biographical sport drama film about Rubin "The Hurricane" Carter, a former middleweight boxer who was wrongly convicted for a triple murder in a bar in Paterson, New Jersey
- In a Class of His Own (1999) – drama television film about a high school janitor must go back to school to get his GED to keep his job, based on a true story
- In Too Deep (1999) – crime thriller hood film loosely based on a true story of an undercover police officer who infiltrated an inner-city drug empire and took down the crime lord in charge
- Inherit the Wind (1999) – drama television film fictionalizing the 1925 Scopes "Monkey" Trial as a means of discussing the 1950s McCarthy trials
- The Insider (1999) – biographical thriller drama film about Jeffrey Wigand, a whistleblower in the tobacco industry, covering his and CBS producer Lowell Bergman's struggles as they defend his testimony against efforts to discredit and suppress it by CBS and Wigand's former employer
- Introducing Dorothy Dandridge (1999) – biographical drama television film about actress and singer Dorothy Dandridge
- The Jesse Ventura Story (1999) – biographical drama television film about the life of ex-pro wrestler Jesse Ventura who became the 38th governor of Minnesota
- Jesus (1999) – Italian-American Christian drama miniseries about the historical events of Jesus Christ
- Joan of Arc (1999) – Canadian historical biographical drama miniseries about the 15th-century Catholic saint of the same name
- Man on the Moon (1999) – biographical comedy drama film about the late American entertainer Andy Kaufman
- Mary, Mother of Jesus (1999) – Christian drama television film retelling the story of Jesus through the eyes of Mary, his mother
- The Messenger: The Story of Joan of Arc (French: Jeanne d'Arc) (1999) – French epic historical drama film portraying the story of St. Joan of Arc, the French war heroine and religious martyr of the Hundred Years War
- Michael Jordan: An American Hero (1999) – biographical sport drama television film about the life of professional basketball player, Michael Jordan
- Milgaard (1999) – Canadian biographical drama miniseries centring on David Milgaard, a Canadian man who was wrongfully convicted in the 1969 rape and murder of Gail Miller, and his 22-year quest for justice until being released from prison in 1992
- The Miracle Maker (Welsh: Gwr y Gwyrthiau) (1999) – British-Russian animated Christian drama film telling the story of the life of Jesus Christ
- Moloch (Russian: Молох) (1999) – Russian biographical drama film portraying Adolf Hitler living life in an unassuming manner during an abrupt journey to the Bavarian Alps, a few months before the notorious Battle of Stalingrad
- Molokai: The Story of Father Damien (1999) – Australian-Belgian biographical drama film about Father Damien, a Belgian priest working at the Kalaupapa Leprosy Settlement on the Hawaiian island of Molokai
- Mother (Russian: Мама) (1999) – Russian musical drama film based on the capture of an Ovechkin family in 1988
- Mr. Rock 'n' Roll: The Alan Freed Story (1999) – biographical drama television film about the life of Alan Freed
- The Murder of Stephen Lawrence (1999) – British crime drama television film based on the murder of Stephen Lawrence committed on 22 April 1993, following Stephen's parents' ,Doreen and Neville, quest for justice as a gang of racists are tried for their son's murder
- Music of the Heart (1999) – biographical musical drama film dramatizing the true story of Roberta Guaspari, who co-founded the Opus 118 Harlem School of Music and fought for music education funding in New York City public schools
- Mutiny (1999) – war drama television film based on the story of the Port Chicago disaster during World War II where 50 African-American sailors were accused of mutiny because they declined to continue loading munitions after an explosion caused by failures in training and management
- My Life So Far (1999) – American-British biographical drama film based on the memoirs of Denis Forman, a British television executive
- Not One Less (Mandarin: 一個都不能少) (1999) – Chinese drama film centring on a 13-year-old substitute teacher in the Chinese countryside, addressing education reform in China, the economic gap between urban and rural populations, and the prevalence of bureaucracy and authority figures in everyday life
- October Sky (1999) – biographical drama film telling the true story of Homer H. Hickam Jr., a coal miner's son who was inspired by the launch of Sputnik 1 in 1957 to take up rocketry against his father's wishes and eventually became a NASA engineer
- One Man's Hero (1999) – American-Mexican-Spanish historical war drama film dramatizing the true story of John Riley and the Saint Patrick's Battalion, a group of Irish Catholic immigrants who desert the mostly Protestant U.S. Army to join the mostly Catholic Mexican side during the Mexican–American War of 1846 to 1848
- Otomo (1999) – German drama film telling the true story of Frederic Otomo, a black man seeking work and asylum in the German city of Stuttgart, however, all he finds is racism
- Passion (1999) – Australian biographical drama film about some episodes in the life of the pianist and composer Percy Grainger
- The Passion of Ayn Rand (1999) – biographical drama television film about Russian-born American writer and public philosopher, Ayn Rand
- Pirates of Silicon Valley (1999) – biographical drama television film exploring the impact that the rivalry between Steve Jobs (Apple Computer) and Bill Gates (Microsoft) had on the development of the personal computer
- Propaganda (1999) – Turkish comedy drama film based on a true story from 1948 about a customs officer who is faced with the duty of formally setting up the border between Turkey and Syria, dividing his hometown
- Ravenous (1999) – horror cannibal film combining elements from the Donner Party and that of the real life "The Colorado Cannibal", Alferd Packer, who survived by eating five companions after becoming snowbound in the San Juan Mountains in the 1870s
- Rembrandt (1999) – international coproduction biographical drama film about the life of iconic artist Rembrandt van Rijn
- RKO 281 (1999) – historical drama television film depicting the troubled production behind the 1941 film Citizen Kane
- Rocky Marciano (1999) – biographical sport drama film telling the story of the rise to fame of legendary boxer Rocky Marciano
- Rogue Trader (1999) – British biographical drama film centring on the life of former derivatives broker Nick Leeson and the 1995 collapse of Barings Bank
- Seventeen Years (Mandarin: 過年回家) (1999) – Chinese crime drama film inspired by real-life testimonies of prison inmates in China
- Shaheed Udham Singh (Punjabi: ਸ਼ਹੀਦ ਊਧਮ ਸਿੰਘ) (1999) – Indian Punjabi-language biographical film based on the life of Udham Singh, an Indian revolutionary who had witnessed the 1919 Amritsar massacre and wanted to avenge the mass killing of his countrymen
- Shaheed-e-Mohabbat Boota Singh (Punjabi: ਸ਼ਹੀਦ-ਏ-ਮੁਹੱਬਤ ਬੂਟਾ ਸਿੰਘ) (1999) – Indian Punjabi-language romance film based on the real-life love story of Boota Singh and Zainab
- Siegfried & Roy: The Magic Box (1999) – biographical drama film about magicians Siegfried & Roy
- The Straight Story (1999) – biographical road drama film based on the true story of Alvin Straight's 1994 journey across Iowa and Wisconsin on a lawn mower
- Strange Justice (1999) – political drama television film covering the Clarence Thomas Supreme Court nomination
- Summer of Sam (1999) – crime thriller film about the 1977 David Berkowitz (Son of Sam) serial murders and their effect on a group of fictional residents of an Italian-American neighborhood in The Bronx in the late 1970s
- Suzy Q (1999) – Dutch biographical drama film based on the childhood memories of Frouke Fokkema
- The Swan and the Wanderer (Finnish: Kulkuri ja joutsen) (1999) – Finnish biographical drama film about two very popular Finnish singer-songwriters, Tapio Rautavaara and Reino Helismaa, who worked together until their relationship got fractious for a long time – covering the years from 1949 to 1965
- Switched at Birth (1999) – drama television film about two baby boys, born more or less at the same time, were switched soon after they had been born, based on a true story
- Tea with Mussolini (Italian: Un tè con Mussolini) (1999) – British-Italian comedy drama film telling the semi-autobiographical story of a young Italian boy's upbringing by a circle of British and American women before and during the Second World War
- To Walk with Lions (1999) – adventure biographical drama film following the later years of Lion advocate George Adamson
- Too Rich: The Secret Life of Doris Duke (1999) – biographical drama miniseries about billionaire tobacco heiress Doris Duke
- Topsy-Turvy (1999) – British historical musical drama film concerning the 15-month period in 1884 and 1885 leading up to the premiere of Gilbert and Sullivan's The Mikado
- Tuesdays with Morrie (1999) – biographical drama television film based on journalist Mitch Albom's 1997 memoir of the same title, particularly the bond with his former professor, Morrie Schwartz, who was dying of ALS
- Tumbleweeds (1999) – comedy drama film based on Angela Shelton's childhood memories spent on the road with her serial-marrying mother
- Ultimate Deception (1999) – crime drama television film based on the story of how Ralph Takemire murdered a young Colorado woman to steal her baby and bring the infant to his childless wife in Overbrook
- Vicious Circle (1999) – British crime drama television film following notorious Irish criminal Martin Cahill as he undertakes a high stakes jewellery robbery, stealing loot worth more than a million pounds
- The Winslow Boy (1999) – historical drama film based on an incident involving George Archer-Shee in the Edwardian era
- Wisconsin Death Trip (1999) – biographical drama film dramatizing a series of macabre incidents that took place in and around Black River Falls, Wisconsin in the late-19th century
- Witch Hunt (1999) – Australian crime drama television film about a young girl who goes missing and her father who accuses his mother-in-law of abducting her, based on a true story
- Wojaczek (1999) – Polish biographical drama film about rebellious Polish poet Rafał Wojaczek
- You Know My Name (1999) – Western biographical drama television film based on the real-life story of lawman and gunslinger Bill Tilghman, who also directed and produced the 1915 Western film The Passing of the Oklahoma Outlaws
