= Gone in the Night (1996 film) =

1996 television film

- Genre: Drama
- Based on: Gone in the Night by David Protess; Rob Warden
- Written by: Brian L. Ross
- Directed by: Bill L. Norton
- Starring: Shannen Doherty; Kevin Dillon; Ed Asner; Dixie Carter
- Music by: Joseph Conlan
- Country of origin: United States
- Original language: English

Production
- Executive producers: Joel Fields; Leonard Hill
- Producers: Bernadette Caulfield; Ardythe Goergens
- Cinematography: Robert Draper
- Editor: Mark W. Rosenbaum
- Running time: 190 minutes
- Production company: Hill-Fields Entertainment

Original release
- Network: CBS
- Release: February 25, 1996

Gone in the Night is a 1996 American television film about the Jaclyn Dowaliby murder case, with Shannen Doherty and Kevin Dillon as Cynthia and David Dowaliby.

== The Dowaliby Case ==
On September 10, 1988, 7 year-old Jaclyn Dowaliby was kidnapped from her home in the middle of the night. Two years later in 1990, Cynthia and Jaclyn's adoptive father David Dowaliby went on trial for the murder of their daughter. Cynthia was acquitted by the judge on grounds of insufficient evidence, but David was tried and convicted of his daughter's death and sentenced to a total of 45 years in prison. His conviction came partly because the jury was shown photographs of a closet door, with fist holes in it. It was later proven that this damage happened before David even moved into the house.

In 1991, David's conviction was overturned when the Illinois Appellate Court reversed the conviction outright, holding that the evidence against him had been no more probative than that against his wife. The murder of Jaclyn remains unsolved.

== Cast ==
- Shannen Doherty as Cynthia "Cindi" Dowaliby
- Kevin Dillon as David Dowaliby
- Ed Asner as Detective John Waters
- James Handy as Andy Litton
- Dixie Carter as Ann Dowaliby
- James Anthony as Detective Foley
- Jeanne Averill as Debbie Sanborn
- Michael Brandon as David Protess
- Billy Burke as Rob Kinney
- Kevin Brief as Terry Summers
- Devon Arielle Cahill as Jaclyn Dowaliby
- Walter Coppage as Hugh Gordon
- Trina Creighton as Kristi Carter
- Ellen Dubin as Mary Ann Brown
- Brett Murray as Davey Dowaliby
- Sarah Phipps a nurse extra
