= The Delicate Art of the Rifle =

- Directed by: D.W. Harper
- Written by: Stephen Grant
- Produced by: T. Todd Flinchum
- Starring: David Grant; Stephen Grant
- Cinematography: Martin Brown
- Release date: 1996
- Running time: 93 minutes
- Country: United States
- Language: English

The Delicate Art of the Rifle is a 1996 independent film directed by Dante W. Harper, with a screenplay by Stephen Grant, based on his short story by the same name. It is a surrealistic comedy-drama about a school shooting as seen through the eyes of a socially awkward college student named Jay. Walt Whitman, the shooter, is loosely based on Charles Whitman, but the film is not in any way a factual account of the 1966 shootings at the University of Texas.

== Plot ==
The movie takes the point-of-view of Jay (David Grant), a college student whose main interests are theater and computer games. While Jay moves around his school's well-equipped theater building he delivers a long voice-over soliloquy revealing his quirky personality. Jay has difficulty interpreting other people: he mentions that his classmates often try to trick him into believing absurd statements, and he cannot always tell whether girls are just being polite to him or if they especially like him. Jay's voice-over is intercut with scenes of the production that is being performed in the theater, a fashion show version of Hamlet.

Jay leaves the theater and encounters one of his professors, Dr. Max Boaz (John Kessel). As Jay and Max are walking outdoors a sniper opens fire from a rooftop and kills all the people around Jay. His roommate Walt (Stephen Grant) yells from the rooftop, asking Jay to come up and join him. Jay assumes Walt must be up there trying to assist wounded people or stop the sniper. Eager to help, Jay enters the building and tries to get to the roof, experiencing several bizarre encounters with other people along the way.

After Jay arrives on the roof he learns that Walt is actually the sniper. Between outbursts of shooting, Walt says he comes from a long line of sharpshooters and has been working on a book about his family entitled The Delicate Art of the Rifle.

Walt also tells Jay about incidents in which Walt tried to locate his girlfriend. She had disappeared and her friends and relatives did not remember her. Walt has come to the conclusion that there is some sort of "metaphysical virus" that erases people from history, removing all traces of them. Walt believes that he also has the virus and will soon disappear.

The movie ends with a long steadicam scene that follows Jay as he walks through the theater building closing doors and turning off lights. In his voice-over monologue Jay reveals that Walt vanished and was never found. Jay says he has lost all his newspaper clippings of the sniper incident. At the very end Jay's voice-over intimates that Walt "erasing virus" theory might have been correct, but with Jay as a classic unreliable narrator this is never definitively established.

== Cast and crew ==
- David Grant (not be confused with actor/playwright David Marshall Grant), who stars as Jay, is also the vocalist for 90's Punk band Action Patrol.
- Stephen Grant plays the role of Walt Whitman and also wrote the screenplay. Grant became interested in rooftop snipers after his film professor Joseph Gomez pointed out his resemblance to Charles Whitman, (the film is dedicated to Joseph Gomez.)
- John Kessel, noted science fiction author and Grant's undergraduate creative writing instructor, plays Professor Max Boaz.
- Another author of science fiction, Bruce Sterling, plays a "Non-Linear Weatherman" who tries to outline for the news anchors that weather, by nature, is complex, unpredictable and chaotic. Coincidentally, or not, Bruce wrote a cyberpunk novel in 1995, "Heavy Weather," about a super-storm called the F-6.
- D.W. Harper (also known as Dante W. Harper) directed the film.
- Alicia Kratzer was the film's co-producer and production designer. She currently works as a graphic designer.
- T. Todd Flinchum was the producer. He later co-produced the independent film Robbing Peter (2004).
- The movie was edited by T. Todd Flinchum, D.W. Harper and Alicia Kratzer.

== Production ==
The Delicate Art of the Rifle was filmed on the campus of North Carolina State University. The rooftop scenes were shot atop the D. H. Hill Library, the tallest building on campus at the time. Filming was completed during a 14-day period in 1995. The cost of production was approximately $110,000.

== Release ==
The film was screened at over 30 American and international film festivals in the mid-1990s and had a limited theatrical release in selected American cities in 1999. It also aired occasionally on the Independent Film Channel. It has not yet been formally released on DVD or other home media.

== Awards ==
- Best Feature award, North Carolina Film Festival (1996)
- Best Narrative Feature award, Chicago Underground Film Festival (1996)
- Prix SACD award (Best Screenplay), Avignon Film Festival (1996)

== Reception ==
Kevin Thomas of the Los Angeles Times called it "one of the best American independent pictures of the past year or so." Cindy Fuchs wrote, "The movie is by turns delirious, provocative, obnoxious and intriguing." Sandra Brennan in Allmovie, after describing the film as difficult and imperfect, wrote that "those who stick with it will be rewarded with the rare opportunity to see a refreshingly intelligent bit of modern American cinema."
