= A Private Matter =

1992 television film directed by Joan Micklin Silver

- Film poster
- Genre: Drama
- Written by: William Nicholson
- Directed by: Joan Micklin Silver
- Starring: Sissy Spacek; Aidan Quinn; William H. Macy; Estelle Parsons
- Theme music composer: James Newton Howard
- Country of origin: United States
- Original language: English

Production
- Executive producers: Ronnie D. Clemmer; Lindsay Doran; Bill Pace; Sydney Pollack
- Producers: David C. Thomas; Cynthia Fitzpatrick
- Cinematography: Paul Elliott
- Editor: Rick Shaine
- Running time: 88 minutes
- Production companies: HBO Pictures; Longbow Productions

Original release
- Network: HBO
- Release: June 20, 1992

A Private Matter is a 1992 American made-for-television drama film based on the true 1962 story of Sherri Finkbine, a resident of Phoenix, Arizona who became known for her decision to have a medically recommended abortion in the first trimester of her fifth pregnancy. Finkbine was the hostess of the locally produced children's television show Romper Room. The film shows the harassment Finkbine and her family went through as they sought to obtain abortion services. The events played a pivotal role in the abortion rights movement and helped shape public opinion prior to the Roe v. Wade decision.

After turning down previous offers to adapt her story to film, Finkbine gave permission to producers Bill Pace and Ronnie D. Clemmer in light of increasingly successful legislation on the legality of abortion and her own outspokenness on the right to choose. The movie premiered on HBO on June 20, 1992. It was noted at the time of the movie's release that U.S. network television had shied away from stories dealing with abortion.

== Plot ==
In 1962, Sherri Finkbine is a married mother of four who hosts the local children's television show Romper Room. She is expecting her fifth child with her husband Bob, a high school teacher. To help her sleep at night, Sherri takes the sedative thalidomide, which was then commonly given to pregnant women in order to alleviate symptoms like morning sickness. At the time, it was not widely known that thalidomide causes birth defects.

In the early weeks of her pregnancy, Sherri learns from her physician Dr. Werner that her fetus will have significant deformities, and he recommends a legal, therapeutic abortion at the Good Samaritan Hospital in Phoenix. Abortion is illegal in Arizona, but exceptions are made if the mother's life is at risk, and under this exception, abortions were performed in hospitals regularly. The Finkbines schedule an abortion, but at a party, an acquaintance who works for the Arizona Republic tells Sherri he is writing a story on the harmful effects of thalidomide. Wanting to warn other women about the drug, Sherri agrees to share her story on the condition of anonymity. However, her identity is exposed in the newspaper, and her private decision to terminate her pregnancy becomes public news, creating a media firestorm.

The controversy results in the loss of Sherri's job, Bob's teaching position, and the harassment of their family. The scheduled abortion is postponed as the hospital does not want the negative publicity. Bob and Sherri arrange to have a press interview at their home to explain their decision. However, the interviewer begins shaming Sherri about her choice and describes the fetus as a baby, which angers Bob who throws the reporter out. FBI agents are assigned to protect the Finkbines from death threats.

On the rescheduled date of her abortion, Sherri goes to the hospital and is kept there in secrecy to not attract any attention. As she waits for the procedure, the hospital administrator talks with colleagues about the legal repercussions that could happen if they proceed with such a high-profile case. Ultimately, they inform the frustrated Sherri they are not going forward with the abortion. Her remaining options include a costly private procedure, or to travel to Japan or Sweden. Sherri's visa is denied by the Japanese Consul. Meanwhile, tensions with Bob come to a head when Sherri feels she is being left out of her husband's discussions with doctors. Bob argues that it is not just her who is going through the ordeal and admits to the emotional toll it is taking on him.

The film ends as the Finkbines leave on a plane for Sweden, where Sherri has been granted her request for an abortion. As reporters ask Sherri for comments, she tells them, "Don't ever go what I'm going through." A postscript states that Finkbine's abortion took place in Sweden in the twelfth week of her pregnancy. While Bob resumed his teaching career, Sherri was not allowed to return to the Romper Room show. In the years after, she and Bob had two more children.

== Cast ==
- Sissy Spacek as Sherri Finkbine
- Aidan Quinn as Bob Finkbine
- Estelle Parsons as Mary Chessen
- Sheila McCarthy as Diane Callaghan
- Richard Venture as Dr. Werner
- Leon Russom as Steve Morris
- Xander Berkeley as Peter Zenner
- Jeff Perry as Randall Everett
- Steven Gilborn as Harvey
- William H. Macy as Psychiatrist
- Carla Gugino as Mary Beth
- Trever O'Brien as Mark Finkbine
- Allison Mack as Terry Finkbine

== Release ==
The film aired at a time when U.S. networks were staying away from abortion stories, due to fear of boycotts and loss of advertising money. The last prominent TV feature films to center on abortion were 1989's Roe vs. Wade, which aired on NBC and lost the network $1 million in advertising, and 1991's Absolute Strangers, which aired on CBS and was protested by anti-abortion groups. A month after Roe vs. Wade aired, the U.S. Supreme Court issued the Webster decision, and entertainment television featured abortion stories less frequently. As HBO is a subscription-based service and not beholden to advertisers, it was the only network that would air A Private Matter.

== Critical reception ==
The film received positive reviews for its writing, direction, and the performances of Spacek, Quinn, and Parsons. Ken Tucker of Entertainment Weekly wrote, "Of all the hot topics that television dramas can tackle in hopes of attracting lots of viewers, abortion is the most problematic. It's easy for a made-for-TV movie to take a bold stand against everything from racism to bulimia—television can reduce most subjects to heart-tugging scenes and therapeutic homilies that a majority of viewers will find reassuring, nonthreatening. But the issue of abortion rights is so complicated, so emotional, so divisive, that it resists TV-movie tidying up. One reason A Private Matter is so strong is that it acknowledges the complexity of its subject." In Variety, Lisa D. Horowitz wrote, "Without preaching, the telefilm offers dramatic evidence of what life would be like without Roe v. Wade. It should be required viewing for those on either side of the debate."
