= Shade Gap, Pennsylvania =

Borough in Pennsylvania, US

- Borough
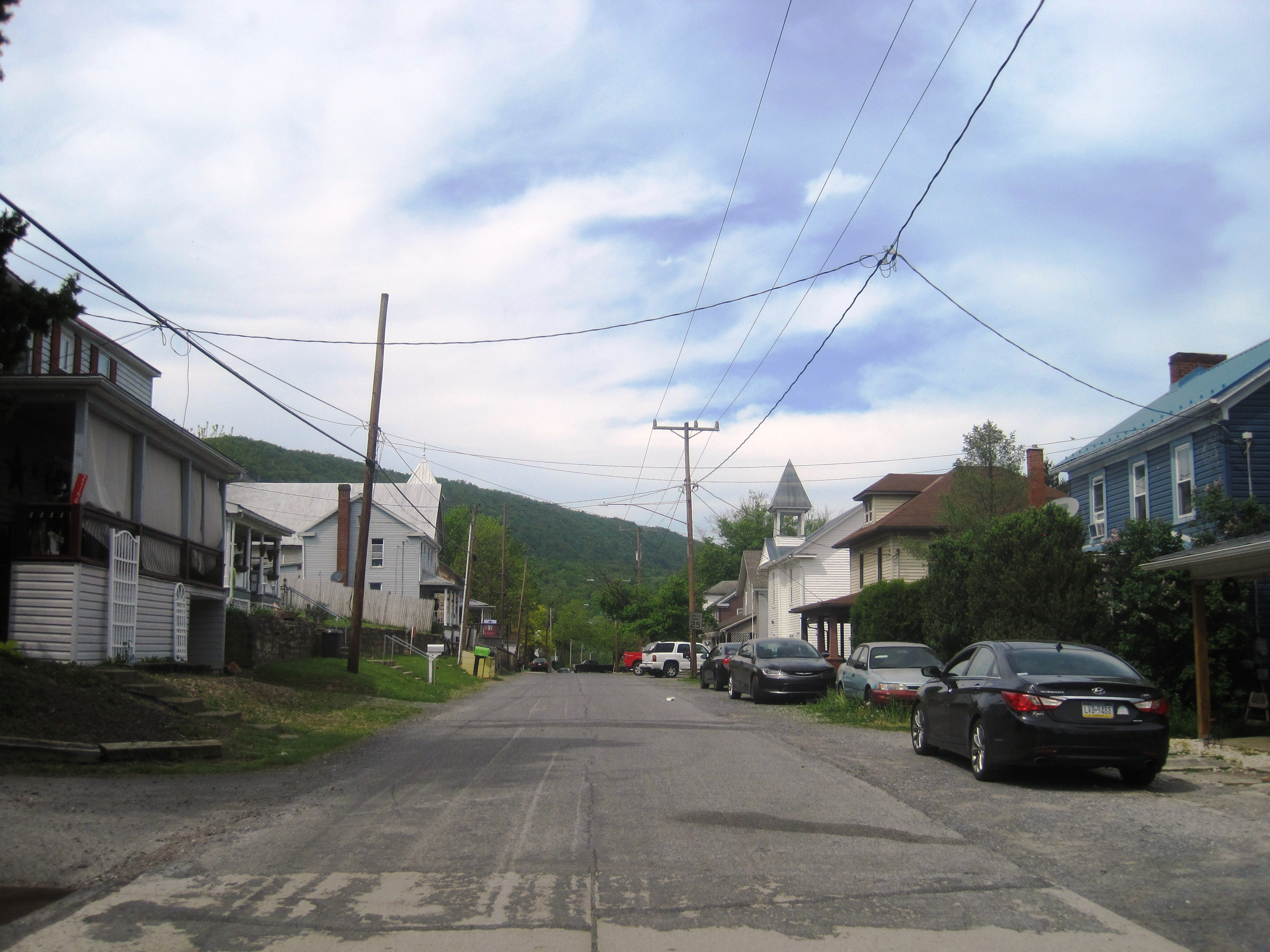
- Northbound Main Street in Shade Gap

- Location of Shade Gap in Huntingdon County, Pennsylvania.

- Location within Pennsylvania Location within the United States
- Coordinates: 40°10′49″N 77°51′58″W
- Country: United States
- State: Pennsylvania
- County: Huntingdon

Government
  - Type: Borough Council

Area
  - Total: 0.031 sq mi (0.08 km^{2})
  - Land: 0.031 sq mi (0.08 km^{2})
  - Water: 0 sq mi (0.00 km^{2})
- Elevation: 1,007 ft (307 m)

Population (2010)
  - Total: 105
  - Estimate (2019): 89
  - Density: 2,816.3/sq mi (1,087.39/km^{2})
- Time zone: UTC-5 (Eastern (EST))
  - Summer (DST): UTC-4 (EDT)
- ZIP Code: 17255
- Area code: 814
- FIPS code: 42-69456
- GNIS feature ID: 1215279
- Local phone exchanges: 259

Shade Gap is a borough in Huntingdon County, Pennsylvania, United States. As of the 2020 census, Shade Gap had a population of 78.

== Geography ==
Shade Gap is located in southeastern Huntingdon County. It sits at the eastern base of Shade Mountain just south of that mountain's water gap where Shade Creek passes through. The borough is entirely surrounded by Dublin Township.

U.S. Route 522 passes just east of the borough, leading north 16 miles (26 km) to Mount Union and south 12 miles (19 km) to Interstate 76 near Fort Littleton. Pennsylvania Route 35 runs northeast along the base of Shade Mountain 37 miles (60 km) to Mifflin, and Pennsylvania Route 641 leads southeast over Tuscarora Mountain 9 miles (14 km) to Spring Run.

According to the U.S. Census Bureau, the borough of Shade Gap has a total area of 0.03 square miles (0.08 km^{2}), all land.

== Demographics ==
Historical population
Census	Pop.	Note	%±
1880	170		—
1890	209		22.9%
1900	138		−34.0%
1910	143		3.6%
1920	136		−4.9%
1930	130		−4.4%
1940	156		20.0%
1950	157		0.6%
1960	140		−10.8%
1970	186		32.9%
1980	141		−24.2%
1990	113		−19.9%
2000	97		−14.2%
2010	105		8.2%
2020	78		−25.7%

At the 2000 census, there were 97 people, 38 households, and 25 families residing in the borough. The population density was 2,103.7 inhabitants per square mile (812.2/km^{2}). There were 43 housing units at an average density of 932.6 per square mile (360.1/km^{2}). The racial makeup of the borough was 97.94% White and 2.06% African American. There were 38 households, 31.6% had children under the age of 18 living with them, 52.6% were married couples living together, 10.5% had a female householder with no husband present, and 34.2% were non-families. 28.9% of households were made up of individuals, and 18.4% were one person aged 65 or older. The average household size was 2.55 and the average family size was 3.08.

In the borough, the population was spread out, with 25.8% under the age of 18, 5.2% from 18 to 24, 30.9% from 25 to 44, 19.6% from 45 to 64, and 18.6% 65 or older. The median age was 36 years. For every 100 females there were 86.5 males. For every 100 females age 18 and over, there were 84.6 males.

The median income for a household in the borough was $18,125, and the median family income was $23,438. Males had a median income of $23,125 versus $15,000 for females. The per capita income for the borough was $9,557. There were 13.0% of families and 19.5% of the population living below the poverty line, including 20.0% of under eighteens and 10.7% of those over 64.

== See also ==
- Kidnapping of Peggy Ann Bradnick
