= This Used to Be My Playground =

1992 single by Madonna

Single by Madonna
- Released: June 16, 1992
- Recorded: March–May 1992
- Studio: Oceanway Recording (Los Angeles, California)
- Genre: Pop
- Length: 5:08
- Label: Sire; Warner Bros.
- Songwriters: Madonna; Shep Pettibone
- Producers: Madonna; Shep Pettibone

Madonna singles chronology
"Rescue Me" (1991)	"This Used to Be My Playground" (1992)	"Erotica" (1992)

Music video
- "This Used To Be My Playground" on YouTube

"This Used to Be My Playground" is a song recorded by American singer Madonna. It is the theme for the film A League of Their Own, in which Madonna appeared. The movie portrayed a fictionalized account of the real-life All-American Girls Professional Baseball League. Madonna was asked to record a song for the film's soundtrack. At that time she was busy recording her fifth studio album, Erotica, with producer Shep Pettibone. They worked on some ideas and came up with "This Used to Be My Playground" in two days. Once presented to director Penny Marshall's team, the song was released as a standalone single on June 16, 1992, by Warner Bros. Records. However, it was not available on the film's soundtrack due to contractual obligations and was later added to the Olympics-inspired Barcelona Gold compilation album, released that summer. The song was included on Madonna's 1995 ballads compilation Something to Remember.

Written and produced by Madonna and Pettibone, "This Used to Be My Playground" was the first time that Pettibone worked with live string arrangements. Madonna recorded the song on a Shure SM57 microphone, with instrumentation from piano, organ, strings and drums. During the final recording, the duo had to redo the whole orchestra section to tailor it for the song. The song starts with a keyboard introduction and strings, with Madonna singing in expressive but subdued vocals. Its verse and chorus merge into each other for having a continuity in the song, yet the track ends abruptly. Lyrically it discusses visiting one's childhood places and not letting go of the past.

The song received positive reviews from critics, who noted it as an essential addition in Madonna's repertoire. The song earned the singer a Golden Globe Award nomination for Best Original Song. It was a commercial success, reaching number one on both the US Billboard Hot 100 and Cash Box Top 100; the track was Madonna's tenth chart-topping single, breaking her tie with Whitney Houston to become the female artist with the most number one singles at that time. It also reached the top of the charts in Canada, Finland, Italy and Sweden, while reaching the top-ten of the charts in Australia, Belgium, France, Germany, Ireland, Netherlands, Norway, Spain, Switzerland and the United Kingdom. The accompanying music video was directed by Alek Keshishian. Madonna had never performed the song live despite its commercial success until February 2, 2024, on The Celebration Tour in Chicago, where she sang a snippet of it with the crowd.

== Background and release ==
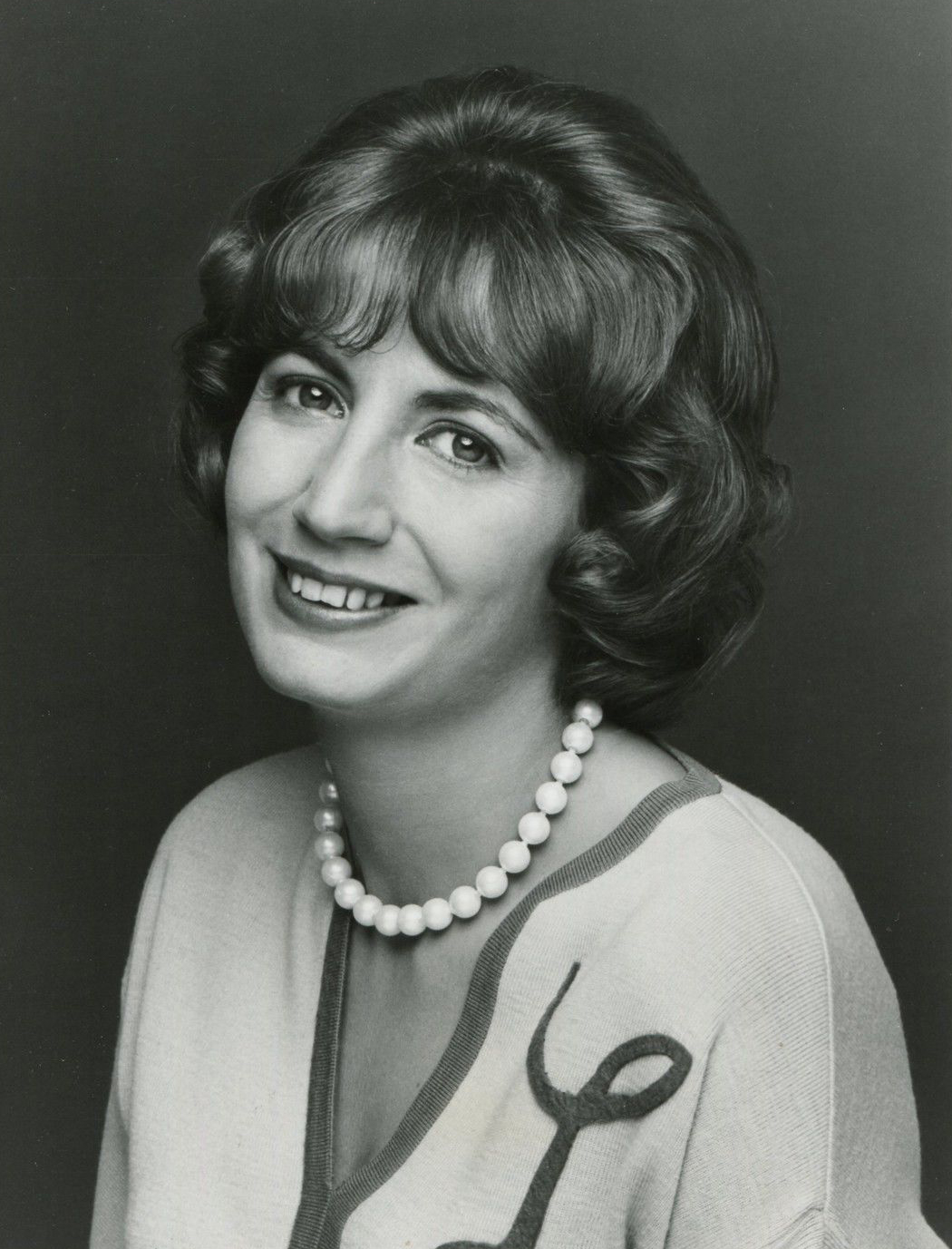
Madonna starred in the film A League of Their Own, which was directed by Penny Marshall (pictured).

In 1992, Madonna starred in the Penny Marshall directed film A League of Their Own, which portrayed a fictionalized account of the real-life All-American Girls Professional Baseball League. Columbia Records representatives presented music supervisor Jay Landers with the film's script. Together with Michael Dilbeck, head of music for Columbia Pictures, they decided to compose a soundtrack for the film. According to Landers, Marshall being well connected to the music community also helped them choose the artists they wanted to work with. The director wanted the music and songs to be performed by contemporary artists, but catering to the period of 1943–44, which was the film's timeline. Carole King had already written the opening song for A League of Their Own, and Madonna being associated with it, Columbia wanted her to record another song. Lars recalled that there was some "early hesitation" if Madonna's character should be kept the same or separated from that in the film and the song, and in the end they decided to go with the latter concept.

After the shooting was over, Madonna was busy in the recording sessions for her fifth studio album, Erotica with producer Shep Pettibone. Throughout January–March 1992, Madonna and Pettibone worked on demos for the album and finally decided on 15 of them. When Lars called Madonna and asked her to record a song for the film, the singer and Pettibone had just completed working on the ballad "Rain". Madonna admitted that she did not have any material for the film and Lars explained that Marshall wanted only a ballad. Pettibone composed a track the same night and Madonna had some ideas she wanted to incorporate. She came up with the melody of "This Used to Be My Playground" by humming over computer-generated chords and rewrote a string arrangement while an orchestra waited in the studio. During an interview with The Guardian, Madonna described the process as "assignment writing" since it was completely separate from her Erotica sessions. It took them two days to write and produce the song, and the final version was submitted to Marshall's team. Lars recalled that they "immediately loved it... We all thought it would be a very successful record and we knew right away it would be perfect."

For contractual reasons, the track could not be included on the official A League of Their Own soundtrack; instead, it was included on the compilation Barcelona Gold, which was released to promote the 1992 Barcelona Summer Olympics. "This Used to Be My Playground" was officially released as a standalone single to promote the film, on June 16, 1992, by Warner Bros. Records. The song was later included on Madonna's 1995 ballad compilation album Something to Remember.

== Recording and composition ==
Recording the track was a new experience for Pettibone since it was the first time that he worked with live musicians and arrangements. Pettibone took the demo of the song, and added live drums, piano and strings to it. They did not have any strings written originally for the song, and chose composer Jeremy Lubbock for the music arrangement; Lubbock had previously worked with Madonna on her soundtrack album I'm Breathless (1990). Madonna recorded the song on a Shure SM57 microphone, with the melody being played over and over again, accompanied by the piano, organ, strings and a basic rim-looping sound on a portable Macintosh computer. Pettibone spent the rest of the recording session working on the verses and final structure of "This Used to Be My Playground" was completed. The day after the song was finished, Madonna traveled to Oregon to work on her next film, Body of Evidence, giving Pettibone the time to finish off the songs for Erotica.

"This Used to Be My Playground"
A 30-second sample of "This Used to Be My Playground" which displays the subdued but expressive vocals by Madonna, as well as an accompaniment of strings.

The duo met again in May 1992 at Oceanway Studios in Los Angeles to complete the orchestration of the song. Lubbock's arrangement was chosen for adding the final touches and the recording started. However, Madonna and Pettibone did not like the orchestra parts and wanted to redo the whole composition. The producer recalled, "Madonna and I had to change the whole arrangement, right there in the studio, with a full orchestra sitting there getting paid for taking up space—around $15,000 for three hours, $3000 for every half-hour over that. And of course, Lubbock was talking to two people who didn't know a C from a B natural. The pressure was on". So they stood near Pettibone's Mac and sang the notes, with Lubbock correcting them. The total recording was finished off in 2 hours and 58 minutes, thereby saving to pay the orchestra the extra fees. The last recording of the song was on Memorial Day where Madonna re-did the lead vocals and improved them. Together they did some final edits of the track and finished it.

"This Used to Be My Playground" features a keyboard introduction, followed by the strings and the song starts. Musically, the song is set in the time signature of common time with a slow tempo of 77 beats per minute. It is composed in the key of G minor with Madonna vocals ranging from the chords of G_{3} to B♭_{4}. The song follows a basic sequence of Gm–F/G–E♭maj_{7}–Dm_{7}–Gsus–G as its chord progression. The chords have an unexpected flow in terms of the beginning and the ending, moving from E♭ down to Gm and momentarily to F major, then going back to the previous sequence again. The song has a lush, romantic quality, with the melody going through different ranges and peaks, and the verse and the chorus flow into each other, making it sound seamless. Madonna sings in subdued but expressive vocals, aided by the strings and background singers during the third verse. Towards the end the singer's voice is double tracked and produces little amount of roughness. Lyrically the song talks about Madonna revisiting the places from her childhood ("This used to be my playground / This used to be my childhood dream"), and evokes the songwriting on her fourth studio album, Like a Prayer (1989). The singer is in a dilemma between choosing the past and letting go, concluding that the latter is difficult ("Say goodbye to yesterday (the dream) / Those are words I'll never say (I'll never say))". The track ends abruptly with a sustained chord by the orchestra and Madonna uttering the line "Wishing you were here with me", which was addressed to her mother. Madonna revealed in an interview with The Village Voice that the song was inspired by her early club days in the 1980s in New York City and the friends (e.g. Martin Burgoyne) she lost to AIDS; the playground acting as a metaphor for the dance floor.

== Critical response ==
After its release, "This Used to Be My Playground" received positive reviews from music critics. J. Randy Taraborrelli, author of Madonna: An Intimate Biography, called the track a "melancholic performance". Michelle Morgan, author of the book Madonna, described it as a "beautiful ballad". Similarly, Humberto Quiroga Lavié called it one of Madonna's best ballads in his essay Secretos y Misterios de Hombres y Mujeres. Author Rikky Rooksby wrote in his book The Complete Guide to the Music of Madonna, that the song was appropriate for the film and its nostalgic moment towards the end, showing the characters grown up and reuniting at a museum opened for themselves and the titular league. He called it "one of Madonna's very best recordings and most expressive single". While reviewing Something to Remember, author Chris Wade wrote in his book The Music of Madonna, that the song conjured up a "strangely sad, nostalgic feel, reminding ourselves of memories from yesteryear". He commended Madonna's vocals calling it as the song's "premier sound" and adding that the way "she sings and captures the melancholic melody is heartbreaking [...] it's one of her finest ever ballads." Encyclopedia Madonnica writer and journalist Matthew Rettenmund noted in the book that the song's rise to the top of the charts was aided by its "honest delivery and aching sense of loneliness, regret and nostalgia for friendship lost."

Larry Flick from Billboard magazine wrote, "She offers a subtle and melancholy vocal amid a string-filled production, ably handled by collaborator Shep Pettibone". He added it as "a mature and thoroughly satisfying effort". Cashbox called it a "reflective ballad". Gavin Report commented, "This change of pace for Madonna is a seamless knuckler of a slow song rich in melody and thoughtfully pitched." Matthew Jacobs from The Huffington Post, placed it at number 32 on his list "The Definitive Ranking of Madonna Singles". He wrote: "What's surprising is that this heartfelt ballad's release was sandwiched between 'Justify My Love' and 'Erotica', which corroborates the many checkered crowns that Madonna can wear". Similarly, AllMusic's Jose F. Promis called it "a quiet predecessor to her most notorious album Erotica". Promis also believed that the single version of the song was worth of collecting since it was not released in CD version in the United States. Sal Cinquemani from Slant Magazine, called it one of the singer's "soundtrack gems". Writing for the Deseret News, Chris Hicks called the song "a lovely change-of-pace number" for Madonna. Richard LeBeau from Medium called it "a gut-wrenching ballad that explores themes related to nostalgia, grief, and heartbreak [...] the best ballad of her career and one of the best ballads of the 90s".

Louis Virtel, from TheBacklot.com, placed "This Used to Be My Playground" at number 52 of his list "The 100 Greatest Madonna Songs". He wrote; "The theme to Madonna’s best movie is nostalgic and sweet, and it gave her a major hit that utilized the lachrymose qualities in her voice." Mary Ann A. Bautist, from the Philippine Daily Inquirer, called it one of the singer's "alternative tunes [...] that can be as romantic and touching as any ballad". Liz Smith, from The Toledo Blade, called it an "exquisite ballad". On his review of the compilation Barcelona Gold, The Daily Gazette's Bill Rice wrote: "Madonna's plaintive single 'This Used to Be My Playground', is one medal winner". Music Week stated that "this is Madonna at her most grown up on a thoughtful, downtempo and tender track". A negative review came from Stylus Magazine's Alfred Soto, who dismissed the song as a "slushy rewrite of Like a Prayer's 'Promise to Try'". Also negative was Stereogum's Tom Breihan, who pointed out that it lacked "the dreamy sweep of older Madonna ballads like 'Crazy For You' and 'Live to Tell'. Instead, it sounds cheap and chintzy". Breihan also deemed it "exactly the wrong song for a singer like Madonna", that should've been sung by a "grand ’90s balladeer" like Whitney Houston or Celine Dion. "This Used to Be My Playground" was nominated for a Golden Globe award for Best Original Song, but lost to "A Whole New World" from Aladdin. It won two accolades at the ASCAP Awards, in the categories of Most Performed Songs from Motion Pictures and Most Performed Pop Song.

== Chart performance ==
In the United States, "This Used to Be My Playground" debuted on the Billboard Hot 100 chart at number 35, for the week of July 4, 1992. The debut was aided by just airplay points which enabled it to enter the Hot 100 Airplay chart at number 14. The song received immediate heavy rotation in US radio stations like Hot 97 in New York and Wild 107 in San Francisco. One week later, the song jumped to number 17 on the Hot 100, having had the largest sales and airplay gain of any record on the chart. On August 8, 1992, the song reached the top of the chart for one week, becoming Madonna's tenth number one single, breaking her tie with Whitney Houston as the female artist with the most number one singles at that time. The song replaced "Baby Got Back" by Sir Mix-a-Lot although it was number three on the Hot Singles Sales and Hot 100 Airplay charts. According to Michael Ellis from Billboard, the song edged out "Baby Got Back" by a small margin of chart points. The song spent a total of 20 weeks on the chart and ranked at number 21 on the Hot 100 year end chart for 1992.

"This Used to Be My Playground" also reached peak positions of number two on the Hot 100 Airplay and number four on the Adult Contemporary charts. It topped the US Cash Box Top 100 in the same period. On September 10, 1992, it was certified gold by the Recording Industry Association of America (RIAA) for shipments of 500,000 copies. Billboard ranked it at number 22 on their list of "Madonna's 40 Biggest Hits" on the Hot 100. In Canada, the song debuted at number 60 on the RPM Top Singles chart on July 4, 1992. After seven weeks it reached the top of the chart and was present for a total of 19 weeks. It also reached number two on the RPM Adult Contemporary chart.

In the United Kingdom, the song debuted at number five on the UK Singles Chart, and reached a peak of number three the week of August 25, 1992, and was present on the top 100 for a total of 9 weeks. It was certified silver by the British Phonographic Industry (BPI) on September 1, 1992, for shipments of 200,000 copies. The single has sold over 275,000 copies as of October 2010. In Italy, the song spent 4 consecutive weeks at the top of the Musica e dischi charts. The song also achieved great success across Europe, hitting number one in various countries including Finland and Sweden and charting within the top ten in other countries. It resulted in the song achieving a peak of number two on the European Hot 100 Singles chart. In Australia the song reached a peak of number nine on the ARIA Charts and received a gold certification from the Australian Recording Industry Association (ARIA) for shipment of 35,000 copies.

== Music video ==
The music video for "This Used to Be My Playground", directed by Alek Keshishian, was filmed in June 1992 at Raleigh Studios in Hollywood, California, and Malibu Beach. It premiered on MTV on June 30, 1992, a day before the release of A League of Their Own. The video shows a man viewing a photo album, as Madonna sings in different settings from within the various pictures. Scenes from A League of Their Own also appear on the album during and after the song's instrumental break. As the video ends, the man having reached the end of the album, then scrolls backwards through the previous pages. As a whole, the video wherein a man viewing a photo album tells of bringing back childhood memories, but even tells that never hold on to the past. The video was commercially released in 2004 as a bonus feature on the 2-disc special edition DVD of A League of Their Own.

According to Rettenmund, unlike most music videos related to film soundtracks, "This Used to Be My Playground" did not give emphasis on having shots from the film in the video itself. Instead Keshishian and Madonna chose introspection as the theme, with simple images to portray them. Rettenmund notes, "At the end, the man who has been looking back at his scrapbook of Madonna lays his head down, sealing the video with the perfect bit of sadness to resonate with Madonna's ennui."

The clip was compared to singer Boy George's music video for his 1987 single, "To Be Reborn", released less than five years before "This Used to Be My Playground". In George's video, he also appears on pages of a photo album, performing the song. George himself stated in his autobiography that he was "furious" after watching Madonna's clip and renamed it "This Used to Be My Video".

== Live performance ==
Madonna performed "This Used to Be My Playground" live for the first time on February 2, 2024, during the Chicago concert as a part of The Celebration Tour. She sang an acapella excerpt, following the speech about the memories of filming A League of Their Own in Chicago.

== Track listings ==
- US 7-inch and cassette single; Japanese 3-inch CD single
1. "This Used to Be My Playground" (single version) – 5:08
2. "This Used to Be My Playground" (the long version) – 6:03
- European 12-inch vinyl and CD single
1. "This Used to Be My Playground" (single version) – 5:08
2. "This Used to Be My Playground" (instrumental) – 6:54
3. "This Used to Be My Playground" (long version) – 6:03
- Digital Single (2024)
1. "This Used to Be My Playground" – 5:10
2. "This Used to Be My Playground" (long version) – 6:04
3. "This Used to Be My Playground" (instrumental Version) – 6:56

== Credits and personnel ==
- Madonna – songwriter, producer, vocals
- Shep Pettibone – songwriter, producer, programming
- Jeremy Lubbock – string arrangement, programming
- Al Schmitt – engineer, mixing
- Jeri Heiden – designer

Credits adapted from the liner notes of Something to Remember and the single release of "This Used to Be My Playground".

== Charts ==
=== Weekly charts ===
Weekly chart performance for "This Used to Be My Playground"
Chart (1992)	Peak position
Australia (ARIA)	9
Austria (Ö3 Austria Top 40)	11
Belgium (Ultratop 50 Flanders)	6
Canada Retail Singles (The Record)	1
Canada Contemporary Hit Radio (The Record)	1
Canada Top Singles (RPM)	1
Canada Adult Contemporary (RPM)	2
Denmark (IFPI)	5
Europe (Eurochart Hot 100)	2
Europe (European Hit Radio)	1
Europe (European AC Radio)	1
Finland (Suomen virallinen lista)	1
France (SNEP)	7
Germany (GfK)	6
Greece (IFPI)	10
Iceland (RÚV)	12
Ireland (IRMA)	2
Italy (Musica e dischi)	1
Japan (Oricon Singles Chart)	59
Netherlands (Dutch Top 40)	8
Netherlands (Single Top 100)	7
Mexico (AMPROFON)	1
New Zealand (Recorded Music NZ)	14
Norway (VG-lista)	3
Panama (El Siglo de Torreón)	7
Portugal (AFP)	8
Spain (AFYVE)	6
Sweden (Sverigetopplistan)	1
Switzerland (Schweizer Hitparade)	6
UK Singles (Official Charts)	3
UK Airplay (Music Week)	2
US Billboard Hot 100	1
US Adult Contemporary (Billboard)	4
US Cash Box Top 100	1
US CHR & Pop (Radio & Records)	1

=== Year-end charts ===
Year-end chart performance for "This Used to Be My Playground"
Chart (1992)	Position
Australia (ARIA)	45
Belgium (Ultratop 50 Flanders)	38
Canada Top Singles (RPM)	8
Canada Adult Contemporary (RPM)	8
Europe (Eurochart Hot 100)	14
Europe (European Hit Radio)	2
France (SNEP)	50
Germany (Media Control)	35
Netherlands (Dutch Top 40)	64
Netherlands (Single Top 100)	43
Norway Summer Period (VG-lista)	4
Sweden (Topplistan)	6
Switzerland (Schweizer Hitparade)	15
UK Singles (OCC)	42
UK Airplay (Music Week)	52
US Billboard Hot 100	21
US Adult Contemporary (Billboard)	33
US Cash Box Top 100	21

=== Decade-end charts ===
Decade-end chart performance for "This Used to Be My Playground"
Chart (1990–1999)	Position
Canada (Nielsen SoundScan)	31

== Certifications and sales ==
Certifications and sales for "This Used to Be My Playground"
Region	Certification	Certified units/sales
Australia (ARIA)	Gold	35,000^{^}
Japan (Oricon Charts)	—	24,240
United Kingdom (BPI)	Silver	275,000
United States (RIAA)	Gold	500,000^{^}
^{^} Shipments figures based on certification alone.

== Release history ==
Release history
Region	Date	Format	Label	Cat. No.	Ref.
United Kingdom	13 July 1992	7"; Cassette; CD; 12"	Sire	W 0122; W 0122C; W 0122CD; W 0122T	

== See also ==
- List of Billboard Hot 100 number-one singles of 1992
- List of Cash Box Top 100 number-one singles of 1992
- List of European number-one airplay songs of the 1990s
- List of number-one singles of 1992 (Canada)
- List of number-one singles of 1992 (Finland)
- List of number-one hits of 1992 (Italy)
- List of number-one singles of 1992 (Sweden)
