= List of number-one singles of 1992 (Finland) =

This is the list of the number-one singles of the Finnish Singles Chart in 1992.

== Chart history ==
Issue date	Artist	Title	Ref
January 20	The KLF	"Justified & Ancient"	
February 3	The KLF	"Justified & Ancient"	
February 10	Pojat	"Pasi Virtanen"	
February 17	Moogetmoogs	"Kolmen minuutin muna"	
March 2	Hausmylly	"Gigolo"	
March 16	Popeda	"Kersantti Karoliina"	
March 30	Kurre	"En rakkauttas saa"	
April 13	J. Karjalainen	"Telepatiaa"	
April 27	ZZ Top	"Viva Las Vegas"	
May 11	DJ Konnat	"9700-Irma"	
May 25	Wilson Phillips	"You Won't See Me Cry"	
June 8	Kaivo	"Kun olet mennyt"	
June 22	Erasure	"Abba-esque"	
July 6	Erasure	"Abba-esque"	
July 20	Nirvana	"Lithium"	
August 3	Madonna	"This Used to Be My Playground"	
August 17	The Shamen	"L.S.I."	
August 31	2 Unlimited	"The Magic Friend"	
September 14	Neon 2	"Polku"	
September 28	Felix	"Don't You Want Me"	
October 12	East 17	"House of Love"	
October 26	Neljä Ruusua	"Juppihippipunkkari (Remix)"	
November 9	Felix	"It Will Make Me Crazy"	
November 23	KCD	"Simo Goes Poing!"	
December 7	KCD	"Simo Goes Poing!"	
December 21	Colours	"Help Us Back Home Sarajevo"	
