= You Ain't Seen Nothing Yet (Bachman–Turner Overdrive song) =

1974 song by Bachman–Turner Overdrive

Single by Bachman–Turner Overdrive

from the album Not Fragile
- B-side: "Free Wheelin'"
- Released: September 1974
- Recorded: 1974
- Genre: Hard rock
- Length: 3:54 (album version); 3:31 (single version)
- Label: Mercury
- Songwriter: Randy Bachman
- Producer: Randy Bachman

Bachman–Turner Overdrive singles chronology
"Takin' Care of Business" (1974)	"You Ain't Seen Nothing Yet" (1974)	"Roll on Down the Highway" (1975)

Music video
- "You Ain't Seen Nothing Yet" on YouTube

"You Ain't Seen Nothing Yet" is a song by Canadian rock band Bachman–Turner Overdrive (BTO). The song was written by Randy Bachman for the band's third studio album Not Fragile (1974). It was released as a single in 1974, with an instrumental track "Free Wheelin'" as the B-side. It reached the number one position on the Billboard Hot 100 singles chart and the Canadian RPM chart the week of November 9, 1974, as well as earning the band their only major hit single in the United Kingdom, peaking at number 2 on the UK Singles Chart. The follow-up single, "Roll on Down the Highway", was also a minor UK hit.

== Composition and recording ==
"You Ain't Seen Nothing Yet" was written by Randy Bachman. According to Bachman, the song was performed as a joke for his brother, Gary, who had a stutter. They only intended to record it once with the stutter and send the only recording to Gary.

Bachman developed the song while recording BTO's third album, Not Fragile (1974). It began as an instrumental piece inspired by the rhythm guitar on Dave Mason's "Only You Know and I Know". Bachman says "it was basically just an instrumental and I was fooling around... I wrote the lyrics, out of the blue, and stuttered them through." The band typically used the song as a "work track" in the studio to get the amplifiers and microphones set properly.

But when winding up production for the album, Charlie Fach of Mercury Records said the eight tracks they had lacked the "magic" that would make a hit single. Some band members asked Bachman, "what about the work track?" Bachman reluctantly mentioned that he had this ninth song, but did not intend to use it on a record. He said, "We have this one song, but it's a joke. I'm laughing at the end. I sang it on the first take. It's sharp, it's flat, I'm stuttering to do this thing for my brother."

Fach asked to hear it, and they played the recording for him. Fach smiled and said "That's the track. It's got a brightness to it. It kind of floats a foot higher than the other songs when you listen to it."

Bachman agreed to rearrange the album sequence so the song could be added, but only if he could re-record the vocals first, without the stutter. Fach agreed, but Bachman says "I tried to sing it normal, but I sounded like Frank Sinatra. It didn't fit." Fach said to leave it as it was, with the stutter.

== Release ==
"You Ain't Seen Nothing Yet" was not originally intended to be a single, but it became popular as an album cut. Radio stations all over the USA were giving it a great deal of airplay, as Not Fragile (1974) was soaring up the album charts—so much so that Bachman was embarrassed because he thought it was a stupid song, just something that he wrote as a joke.

With no singles yet released from the Not Fragile album, Fach would regularly call Bachman with airplay reports, asking for permission to release "You Ain't Seen Nothing Yet". Bachman said, "And I refused for three weeks. I was producer, so I had final say on what went out. I woke up one day and asked myself, 'Why am I stopping this?' Some of my favorite records are really dumb things like 'Louie, Louie'...so I said to Charlie, 'O.K., release it. I bet it does nothing.'"

The song was released as a single in September 1974.

== Reception ==
Billboard described "You Ain't Seen Nothing Yet" as a "basic rocker featuring licks reminiscent of the Velvet Underground's 'Sweet Jane'," and praised the melodies and the vocal hook. Cash Box said that "this simply super rocker with a perfect hook is a rock experience that is not to be missed" and that it is "one of the best rockers of the year". Record World said that "Comin' on like a cross between 'My Generation' and 'Pinball Wizard,' this is the tune to break BTO into the Who-fashioned stratosphere of top rockdom."

=== Commercial performance ===
"You Ain't Seen Nothing Yet" debuted at number 65 on the Billboard Hot 100 chart for the week ending September 21, 1974, and reached the top of the Hot 100 seven weeks later. It was the only US number one single in BTO's chart history. (While as part of the Guess Who, Bachman had penned one other US chart-topper, "American Woman", which hit number one in 1970.)

"You Ain't Seen Nothing Yet" also holds the record for falling the farthest from number one on the Hot 100 before returning to the top 10. After falling to number 34 two weeks after being at number one, it jumped back to number eight for two weeks, largely because of interest in the flip side, an instrumental called "Free Wheelin'". The song is not listed in Billboard's Top 100 singles of 1974 despite having reached number one within the time period covered by the chart, and is listed as the number 98 song of 1975. Its absence from the 1974 list and low placing on the 1975 list is due to its rapid ascent to number one and rapid descent before re-peaking at number eight, meaning its chart points were not focused within either the 1974 or 1975 chart periods.

In Canada, the single also reached number one and won the 1976 Juno Award for best-selling single.

In the UK it reached number two, kept off the top of the charts by "Lonely This Christmas" by Mud. It was later introduced to a new generation of fans in the UK when a remixed version was used as the theme tune to the ITV network's coverage of Formula One grand prix motor racing between 2003 and 2005, resulting in increased radio airplay for the original song in the UK during that period.

=== In popular culture ===
During The Game Awards 2024, the song was used during The Outer Worlds 2 Official Gameplay Trailer.

== Track listing ==
1974 single
No.	Title	Length
1.	"You Ain't Seen Nothing Yet"	3:31
2.	"Free Wheelin'"	3:44
Total length:		7:15

== Charts ==
=== Weekly charts ===
Chart (1974–1975)	Peak position
Australia (Kent Music Report)	4
Austria (Ö3 Austria Top 40)	3
Belgium (Ultratop 50 Flanders)	6
Belgium (Ultratop 50 Wallonia)	17
Canada Top Singles (RPM)	1
Denmark (Tracklisten)	1
Germany (GfK)	1
Ireland (IRMA)	4
Netherlands (Dutch Top 40)	3
Netherlands (Single Top 100)	3
New Zealand (Recorded Music NZ)	25
Norway (VG-lista)	7
South Africa (Springbok)	1
Switzerland (Schweizer Hitparade)	5
UK Singles (Official Charts)	2
US Billboard Hot 100	1

=== Year-end charts ===
Chart (1974)	Rank
Canadian RPM Top Singles	4
German Media Control Charts	71
Netherlands	97

Chart (1975)	Rank
Australia (Kent Music Report)	31
South African Singles Chart	1
German Media Control Charts	10
Austrian Top 40	12
Belgian VRT Top 30	82
US Billboard Hot 100	98

== Cover versions ==
"Kolmen minuutin muna"

Single by Moogetmoogs

from the album Kadonnut levy
- B-side: "Klu klu (mua rakastatko?)"
- Released: 1991
- Genre: Rock
- Length: 4:08 (album version)
- Label: Poko
- Composer: Randy Bachman
- Lyricists: Randy Bachman (original English); Moog Konttinen (Finnish)

Moogetmoogs singles chronology
"Annas kun hörppään" (1989)	"Kolmen minuutin muna" (1991)

In 1989, American band Figures on a Beach released a cover version which reached number 67 on the Billboard Hot 100.

Finnish band Moogetmoogs released a cover version of "You Ain't Seen Nothing Yet" (re-titled "Kolmen minuutin muna") as the second single from their 1991 album Kadonnut levy ("The Lost Record"), with a cover version of The Contours song "Do You Love Me" (retitled "Klu klu (mua rakastatko)?") as its B-side. Released in 1991, the single started to receive significant airplay and media attention beginning in November and hit number 1 on the Finnish charts in February 1992.

British eurodance band Bus Stop covered the song in 1998, and it reached #22 on the UK pop charts.

Figures on a Beach scored a minor hit in 1989 with their version of the song. It has also been covered by John Otway, ApologetiX (1999), Yo La Tengo (2006), The Disco Boys (2006) and Dutch band Oôs Joôs who retitled it "Bier En Zwere Sjek" (2008).

== See also ==
- List of Hot 100 number-one singles of 1974 (U.S.)
- List of number-one hits of 1975 (Germany)
- List of number-one singles of 1992 (Finland)
- "You ain't heard nothing yet!", a catchphrase popularized by Al Jolson, also used in the movie The Jazz Singer
