= Barcelona Gold =

Compilation album by various artists
- Released: 1992
- Genre: Pop; rock; R&B; country
- Label: Warner Bros.

Alternative cover
- US cover of the album

Professional ratings
Review scores
Source	Rating
AllMusic	2/5 stars

Barcelona Gold is a compilation album that was released to coincide with the 1992 Summer Olympics in Barcelona, Spain. The album reached number 32 on the US Billboard 200.

== Track listing ==
No.	Title	Artist	Length
1.	"Barcelona"	Freddie Mercury and Montserrat Caballé	4:26
2.	"One Song"	Tevin Campbell	4:26
3.	"How Fast, How Far"	Anita Baker	4:00
4.	"Higher Baby"	DJ Jazzy Jeff & The Fresh Prince	3:26
5.	"Keep It Comin'"	Keith Sweat	4:35
6.	"Free Your Mind"	En Vogue	4:46
7.	"Don't Tread on Me"	Damn Yankees	5:11
8.	"Not Enough Time"	INXS	4:20
9.	"Go Out Dancing"	Rod Stewart	4:21
10.	"Texas Flyer"	Travis Tritt	6:06
11.	"The Heart to Climb the Mountain"	Randy Travis	3:00
12.	"Old Soldier"	Marc Cohn	3:55
13.	"This Used to Be My Playground"	Madonna	4:42
14.	"No Sé Tú"	Luis Miguel	3:47
15.	"Wonderful Tonight"	Eric Clapton	5:24
16.	"Love Is Here to Stay"	Natalie Cole	3:29
17.	"Amigos Para Siempre (Friends for Life)"	Sarah Brightman and José Carreras	4:34

Notes

- Some versions of the album omit "Not Enough Time" by INXS.
- "Free Your Mind" by En Vogue is an alternative version with altered lyrics.
- "Wonderful Tonight" by Eric Clapton is a live version.

== Charts ==
Chart performance for Barcelona Gold
Chart (1992)	Peak position
Dutch Albums (Album Top 100)	49
Hungarian Albums (MAHASZ)	6
New Zealand Albums (RMNZ)	34
Norwegian Albums (VG-lista)	6
Swiss Albums (Schweizer Hitparade)	4
US Billboard 200	32
