= List of European number-one hits of 1992 =

This is a list of the European Music & Media magazine's European Hot 100 Singles and European Top 100 Albums number-ones of 1992.

Issue date	Song	Artist	Album	Artist
4 January	"Black or White"	Michael Jackson	Dangerous	Michael Jackson
11 January	"Black or White"	Michael Jackson	Greatest Hits II	Queen
18 January	"Black or White"	Michael Jackson	Dangerous	Michael Jackson
25 January	"Black or White"	Michael Jackson	Greatest Hits II	Queen
1 February	"Black or White"	Michael Jackson	Greatest Hits II	Queen
8 February	"Black or White"	Michael Jackson	Greatest Hits II	Queen
15 February	"Don't Let The Sun Go Down On Me"	George Michael & Elton John	Greatest Hits II	Queen
22 February	"Don't Let The Sun Go Down On Me"	George Michael & Elton John	Greatest Hits II	Queen
29 February	"Don't Let The Sun Go Down On Me"	George Michael & Elton John	Greatest Hits II	Queen
7 March	"Don't Let The Sun Go Down On Me"	George Michael & Elton John	Greatest Hits II	Queen
14 March	"Don't Let The Sun Go Down On Me"	George Michael & Elton John	Greatest Hits II	Queen
21 March	"Don't Let The Sun Go Down On Me"	George Michael & Elton John	We Can't Dance	Genesis
28 March	"Don't Let The Sun Go Down On Me"	George Michael & Elton John	We Can't Dance	Genesis
4 April	"Don't Let The Sun Go Down On Me"	George Michael & Elton John	We Can't Dance	Genesis
11 April	"To Be With You"	Mr. Big	Stars	Simply Red
18 April	"To Be With You"	Mr. Big	Human Touch	Bruce Springsteen
25 April	"To Be With You"	Mr. Big	Human Touch	Bruce Springsteen
2 May	"To Be With You"	Mr. Big	Human Touch	Bruce Springsteen
9 May	"To Be With You"	Mr. Big	Human Touch	Bruce Springsteen
16 May	"To Be With You"	Mr. Big	Human Touch	Bruce Springsteen
23 May	"To Be With You"	Mr. Big	Human Touch	Bruce Springsteen
30 May	"To Be With You"	Mr. Big	Greatest Hits II	Queen
6 June	"Rhythm is a Dancer"	Snap!	Greatest Hits II	Queen
13 June	"Jump"	Kris Kross	Greatest Hits II	Queen
20 June	"Rhythm is a Dancer"	Snap!	Back to Front	Lionel Richie
27 June	"Rhythm is a Dancer"	Snap!	Back to Front	Lionel Richie
4 July	"Rhythm is a Dancer"	Snap!	Back to Front	Lionel Richie
11 July	"Rhythm is a Dancer"	Snap!	Back to Front	Lionel Richie
18 July	"Rhythm is a Dancer"	Snap!	The One	Elton John
25 July	"Rhythm is a Dancer"	Snap!	The One	Elton John
1 August	"Rhythm is a Dancer"	Snap!	The One	Elton John
8 August	"Rhythm is a Dancer"	Snap!	The One	Elton John
15 August	"Rhythm is a Dancer"	Snap!	The One	Elton John
22 August	"Rhythm is a Dancer"	Snap!	The One	Elton John
29 August	"Rhythm is a Dancer"	Snap!	The One	Elton John
5 September	"Rhythm is a Dancer"	Snap!	We Can't Dance	Genesis
12 September	"Rhythm is a Dancer"	Snap!	Dangerous	Michael Jackson
19 September	"Rhythm is a Dancer"	Snap!	Dangerous	Michael Jackson
26 September	"It's My Life"	Dr. Alban	Tourism	Roxette
3 October	"It's My Life"	Dr. Alban	Tourism	Roxette
10 October	"It's My Life"	Dr. Alban	Tourism	Roxette
17 October	"Erotica"	Madonna	Tourism	Roxette
24 October	"Erotica"	Madonna	Us	Peter Gabriel
31 October	"Erotica"	Madonna	Us	Peter Gabriel
7 November	"End of the Road"	Boyz II Men	Us	Peter Gabriel
14 November	"End of the Road"	Boyz II Men	Erotica	Madonna
21 November	"End of the Road"	Boyz II Men	ABBA Gold: Greatest Hits	ABBA
28 November	"End of the Road"	Boyz II Men	ABBA Gold: Greatest Hits	ABBA
5 December	"I Will Always Love You"	Whitney Houston	ABBA Gold: Greatest Hits	ABBA
12 December	"I Will Always Love You"	Whitney Houston	ABBA Gold: Greatest Hits	ABBA
19 December	"I Will Always Love You"	Whitney Houston	ABBA Gold: Greatest Hits	ABBA
26 December	"I Will Always Love You"	Whitney Houston	ABBA Gold: Greatest Hits	ABBA

== See also ==
- 1992 in music
- List of number-one hits in Europe
