= List of number-one hits of 1992 (Italy) =

The list of number-one singles of 1992 in Italy includes all the songs that reached the top spot on the weekly chart compiled by the Italian music magazine Musica e Dischi. The oldest music industry publication in Italy, it had published the record chart since 1960, ranking the weekly best-selling singles in the country. The Musica e dischi chart was regularly featured on the Hits of the World section of Billboard magazine in the United States, as well as pan-European music industry publication Music & Media.

== Chart history ==
Week	Single	Artist(s)
1	"Black or White"	Michael Jackson
2	"Mysterious Ways"	U2
3	"Mysterious Ways"	U2
4	"Don't Let the Sun Go Down on Me"	George Michael and Elton John
5	"Don't Let the Sun Go Down on Me"	George Michael and Elton John
6	"Don't Let the Sun Go Down on Me"	George Michael and Elton John
7	"Don't Let the Sun Go Down on Me"	George Michael and Elton John
8	"Don't Let the Sun Go Down on Me"	George Michael and Elton John
9	"Don't Let the Sun Go Down on Me"	George Michael and Elton John
10	"Don't Let the Sun Go Down on Me"	George Michael and Elton John
11	"Human Touch"	Bruce Springsteen
12	"Human Touch"	Bruce Springsteen
13	"Human Touch"	Bruce Springsteen
14	"Human Touch"	Bruce Springsteen
15	"Human Touch"	Bruce Springsteen
16	"Why"	Annie Lennox
17	"Why"	Annie Lennox
18	"Why"	Annie Lennox
19	"Why"	Annie Lennox
20	"Why"	Annie Lennox
21	"Why"	Annie Lennox
22	"Why"	Annie Lennox
23	"Rhythm Is a Dancer"	Snap!
24	"Rhythm Is a Dancer"	Snap!
25	"Rhythm Is a Dancer"	Snap!
26	"Rhythm Is a Dancer"	Snap!
27	"Rhythm Is a Dancer"	Snap!
28	"Rhythm Is a Dancer"	Snap!
29	"Rhythm Is a Dancer"	Snap!
30	"Rhythm Is a Dancer"	Snap!
31	"Rhythm Is a Dancer"	Snap!
32	"Rhythm Is a Dancer"	Snap!
33	"Rhythm Is a Dancer"	Snap!
34	"Rhythm Is a Dancer"	Snap!
35	"Rhythm Is a Dancer"	Snap!
36	"Rhythm Is a Dancer"	Snap!
37	"Hanno ucciso l'Uomo Ragno"	883
38	"Hanno ucciso l'Uomo Ragno"	883
39	"This Used to Be My Playground"	Madonna
40	"This Used to Be My Playground"	Madonna
41	"This Used to Be My Playground"	Madonna
42	"This Used to Be My Playground"	Madonna
43	"Erotica"	Madonna
44	"Erotica"	Madonna
45	"Erotica"	Madonna
46	"Erotica"	Madonna
47	"Erotica"	Madonna
48	"Erotica"	Madonna
49	"Erotica"	Madonna
50	"Don't You Want Me"	Felix
51	"Deeper and Deeper"	Madonna
52	"Deeper and Deeper"	Madonna
