= Deeper and Deeper =

1992 single by Madonna

Single by Madonna

from the album Erotica
- Released: November 17, 1992
- Studio: Soundworks (New York)
- Genre: Dance-pop; deep house
- Length: 5:33
- Label: Maverick; Sire; Warner Bros.
- Songwriters: Madonna; Shep Pettibone; Anthony Shimkin
- Producers: Madonna; Shep Pettibone

Madonna singles chronology
"Erotica" (1992)	"Deeper and Deeper" (1992)	"Bad Girl" (1993)

Music video
- "Deeper and Deeper" on YouTube

"Deeper and Deeper" is a song by American singer Madonna from her fifth studio album, Erotica (1992). It was written by Madonna, Shep Pettibone, and Anthony Shimkin and was produced by Madonna and Pettibone. In Australia and most European countries, the song was released as the album's second single on November 17, 1992; in the United States, a release was issued on December 8. It was included on Madonna's second greatest hits compilation, GHV2 (2001). A dance-pop and deep house song, it has disco and Philadelphia soul influences; the bridge features instrumentation from flamenco guitars and castanets and features background vocals from the singer's collaborators Donna De Lory and Niki Haris. Lyrically, the song talks about sexual desire, though it has been argued that it is actually about a young man coming to terms with his homosexuality. It includes a reference to Madonna's single "Vogue" (1990).

Upon release, the song received positive reviews from music critics. They often praised the singer for returning to a more dance-oriented nature in comparison to her previous single "Erotica", and singled out the "Vogue" sample. In retrospective reviews, it is now considered one of Madonna's best singles. The song also was commercially successful, peaking at number seven on the US Billboard Hot 100 and reaching the top 10 in several other countries, including Belgium, Canada, Denmark, Finland, Ireland, New Zealand, and the United Kingdom, while peaking at number one in Italy. The accompanying music video was directed by Bobby Woods. It was seen as a homage to American artist Andy Warhol and Italian director Luchino Visconti, with Madonna playing a character based on Edie Sedgwick, who goes out to a nightclub to meet her friends and boyfriend. The clip received generally mixed to positive reviews from critics. Madonna has performed "Deeper and Deeper" in three of her concert tours, the last being 2015–2016's Rebel Heart Tour.

== Background and recording ==
In 1992, Madonna founded her own multi-media entertainment company Maverick, consisting of a record company (Maverick Records), a film production company (Maverick Films), and associated music publishing, television broadcasting, book publishing, and merchandising divisions. The first two projects from the venture were her fifth studio album Erotica and a coffee table book of photographs featuring Madonna, entitled Sex. For Erotica, Madonna primarily collaborated with American producer Shep Pettibone; Pettibone first began working with the singer during the 1980s, providing remixes for several of her singles. Pettibone would build the base music of the songs in a style similar to his remixes, while Madonna wrote the melodies and lyrics. According to the producer in an article titled "Erotica Diaries", published in Madonna's Icon magazine, he created a tape of three tracks for Madonna to listen to; he traveled to Chicago, where she was filming A League of Their Own (1992), played the songs for her and she liked all of them. In October 1991, Madonna met with Pettibone in New York City to start working on demos. The first batch of songs they worked together on were "Erotica", "Deeper and Deeper", "Rain" and "Thief of Hearts". Anthony Shimkin, who also worked on the album, recalled that Madonna had with her a "book full of lyrics and melody ideas".

At first, the singer did not like the songs she had recorded. She wanted Erotica to have a raw edge, as if it were recorded in an alley in Harlem, and not a light glossy production, according to Pettibone. In the case of "Deeper and Deeper", the producer revealed that they tried different bridges and changes, but in the end, Madonna wanted the middle of the song to have a flamenco guitar, an idea he disagreed with; "I didn't like [...] taking a Philly house song and putting 'La Isla Bonita' in the middle of it. But that's what she wanted, so that's what she got", he recalled. He later decided to add castanets to "really take it there". According to Shimkin, while they were recording the song, Pettibone began singing some lines of "Vogue" (1990); Madonna, who heard this and emulated it, liked the sound and decided to keep it. She later explained: "When we were actually recording, doing the final vocals, I just went off into that for a second because ['Vogue'] to me it's just one of those great kind of feel good dance songs."

== Composition and lyrics ==
"Deeper and Deeper
A 30 second sample from "Deeper and Deeper", featuring the refrain in which the singer sings I can't help falling in love, I fall deeper and deeper the further I go

"Deeper and Deeper" was written by Madonna, Pettibone and Shimkin, and produced by Madonna and Pettibone. Recording took place at Astoria's Sound Work Studios; personnel working on the song included Pettibone on the sequencing, keyboard arrangement, and programming, alongside Shimkin; Paul Pesco on guitars, Dennis Mitchell and Robin Hancock were the song's recording engineers, while George Karras was the mixing engineer. Background vocals were provided by Niki Haris and Donna De Lory. Musically, "Deeper and Deeper" is a house-flavored track with disco and Philadelphia soul influences. Its lyrics talk about sexual desire, but Dan Cadan argued in his text in the liner notes of GHV2 (2001), that they are actually about a young man coming to terms with his homosexuality. Madonna herself described the lyrics as "not terribly intellectual". Shimkin said he saw the song as a "big nod" to Madonna's earlier works with John "Jellybean" Benitez; De Lory on the other hand, recalled that, "[Niki and I]'d sung with [Madonna] before so it was just a really comfortable relationship. And oh my God, this song! All Niki and I wanted to do was sing sweeter and sweeter and sweeter".

"Deeper and Deeper" begins with Madonna singing Deeper and deeper and deeper, followed by the refrain I can't help falling in love, I fall deeper and deeper the further I go. The song's opening line When you know the notes to sing, you can sing most anything references "Do-Re-Mi" from The Sound of Music (1959). Also present are "a juxtaposition of swirling disco synths", a flamenco guitar, and castanets on its bridge. According to the sheet music published by Alfred Publishing Inc., "Deeper and Deeper" is set in the time signature of common time with a fast tempo of 120 beats per minute. It is composed in the key of G minor, with Madonna's voice in a high register, spanning between F_{1} to G3. The song has a basic sequence of G_{7}–Cm_{7}/G as its chord progression. Towards the end, the song includes a lyrical sample of "Vogue" which, according to academic Georges-Claude Guilbert, author of Madonna as Postmodern Myth, "enhance[s] the ending of the song, in an ultimate post-modern twist".

== Release and critical reception ==
"A stylistic diversion on the often chilly Erotica album, ['Deeper and Deeper'] calls back to 'Vogue' (both musically and via a direct late-song lift) with its disco warmth and propulsive house beat. But while 'Vogue' was about the joy of release, 'Deeper and Deeper' is a dance anthem for those who haven’t yet reached that level of confidence".

— Billboard's Joe Lynch reviewing "Deeper and Deeper" on the magazine's list of Madonna's 100 best songs.

In Australia and most European countries, "Deeper and Deeper" was released as the official second single from the Erotica album on November 17, 1992; in the United States, it was released on December 8. It was then included on Madonna's second compilation album, GHV2 (2001). Upon release, the song was met with generally positive reviews from music critics. J. Randy Taraborrelli, author of Madonna: An Intimate Biography, noted it was a "change of pace from the title track. A straight-ahead house groove in the tradition of the funkiest New York clubs". Similarly, Billboard's Joe Lynch expressed that, "if 'Erotica' was a bold sonic departure for Madonna, the second single, 'Deeper and Deeper', found her in more familiar disco and house territory". Also from Billboard, Larry Flick stated that, "the chorus embeds in your brain upon impact", and highlighted the "Vogue" sample as "one of the song's cooler moments". On his review of Erotica, the magazine's Paul Verna referred to "Deeper and Deeper" as a "playful disco-throwback". AllMusic's Stephen Thomas Erlewine considered it among Madonna's "best and most accomplished music". For Rolling Stone, Arion Berger highlighted the track as one of the album's "pure disco" moments that do not need "emotional resonance to make them race".

Anthony Violanti from The Buffalo News compared "Deeper and Deeper" to the work of Donna Summer. In this vein, Matthew Rettenmund, author of Encyclopedia Madonnica, said it was the singer's take on "Never Can Say Goodbye". J. D. Considine, from The Baltimore Sun, called it "explosive, exultant", and one of Madonna's best singles. Slant Magazine's Sal Cinquemani deemed the single "both a product of its time and a timeless Madge classic", as well as one of the singer's "gems" that "get lost to pop history". In another occasion, Cinquemani said that it is "one of the few tracks from Erotica not weighed down or muddled by Pettibone's gritty production" that sounds equally good today to how "it did nearly a decade ago". Entertainment Weekly's David Browne opined the single "whooshes like a subway train going express at 4 a.m.". Charlotte Robinson of PopMatters hailed it a "great pop song about the importance of listening to Mom and Dad's advice". For Q's Phil Sutcliffe, "Deeper and Deeper" was the biggest surprise on Erotica that "could be mistaken for a bopalong tribute to Kylie". At Blender, Tony Powers considered it one of the album's standout tracks. Music writer James Masterton praised Madonna for returning to the "basic pop/dance she does best", but felt the song did not have "chart topping potential". Barbara Walker, writing in the Sun-Sentinel, opined that, "the set's showcase dance track, 'Deeper and Deeper', never quite takes off", and deemed the "Vogue" sample lazy. In a less favorable review, Cashbox's Randy Clark dismissed its "soulless and formulaic disco/kiddie-pop sounds dating back to 'Into the Groove'" and "simpleton Madonna lyrics [and] overdone melodic phrases".

Retrospective reviews have been largely positive. In 2011, Slant Magazine placed the song at number 36 on their list of "The 100 Best Singles of the 1990s"; Ed Gonzalez wrote: "Among Madonna's finest achievements, the angsty pop anthem 'Deeper and Deeper' is both an acute distillation of Erotica's smut-glam decadence and the singer's lifelong blond ambition". Matthew Jacobs from HuffPost placed the song at number 35 of his ranking of Madonna's singles, calling it her "finest disco flourish". On Gay Star News' ranking, the single came in at number 11; Joe Morgan called it "infectious, entrancing and one of her best dance anthems". Jude Rogers, from The Guardian, opined "Deeper and Deeper" is a "classy post-'Vogue' excursion into 90s R&B", and placed it at number 27 of her ranking of Madonna singles. Nayer Missim from PinkNews considered "Deeper and Deeper" Madonna's 19th greatest song, and Entertainment Weekly's Chuck Arnold her 25th; the former said it is "house and pop that’s equal parts disco and bedroom", while the latter deemed it a sequel to "Vogue", due to the lyrical nod. Writing for The A.V. Club, Stephen Thomas Erlewine placed the track in the 28th position of the publication's ranking of Madonna's singles: "['Deeper and Deeper'] is a ray of light within the darkly provocative Erotica". Louis Virtel, writing for The Backlot, named "Deeper and Deeper" the seventh best song of Madonna's discography, referring to it as "jubilant and driving", and comparing it to her 1987 single "Causing a Commotion". Nick Levine from NME deemed it underrated and said it deserves to be "embraced as a classic".

== Commercial performance ==
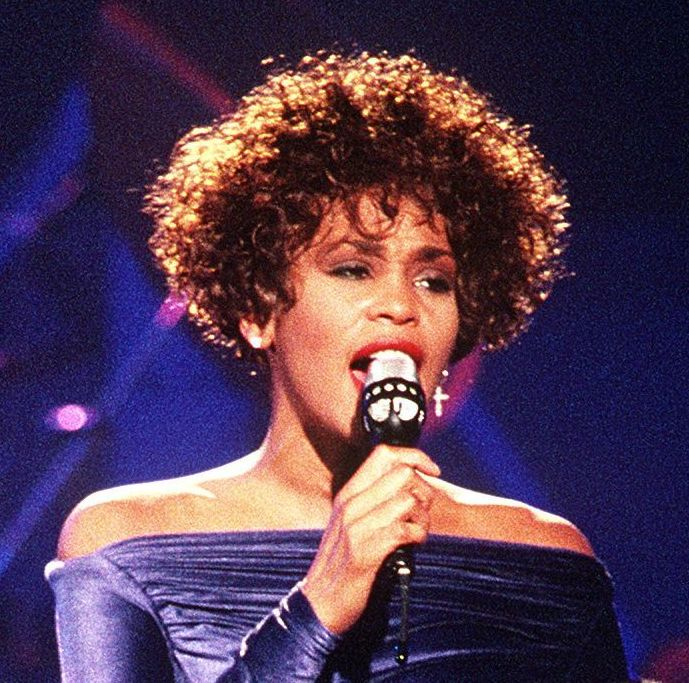
Whitney Houston's (pictured) "I Will Always Love You" kept "Deeper and Deeper" from reaching the first position of RPM's Top Singles chart.

"Deeper and Deeper" debuted on the US Billboard Hot 100 at number 38 the week of December 5, 1992, and quickly climbed up the chart, ultimately peaking at number 7 on the week of January 30, 1993, remaining on the chart for seventeen weeks in total. The song became Madonna’s 25th Top 10 entry on the Hot 100. On the Hot 100 Airplay and Top Singles Sales charts, it peaked at numbers 8 and 15, respectively. The single saw success on Billboard's Maxi-Singles Sales and Dance Club Play charts, as it reached the first position of both. The track became Madonna's 14th chart-topper on the latter chart. "Deeper and Deeper" peaked at number 2 on the Mainstream Top 40 chart, and at number 14 on the Rhythmic chart. By the end of 1993, it ranked 17th on the Dance Club Play chart, number 28 on the Dance Music Maxi-Singles Sales chart, 53 on the radio chart, and 66 on the Hot 100. In Canada, the single debuted in the 77th position of RPM's Top Singles chart on the week of December 12, 1992; two months later, it peaked at number two just behind Whitney Houston's "I Will Always Love You". The single topped RPM's Dance charts and came in at number 21 on the Adult Contemporary chart. "Deeper and Deeper" came in at numbers 34 and 31 on the official year-end chart and the Dance year-end chart, respectively.

In the United Kingdom, "Deeper and Deeper" debuted at the 10th position of the UK Singles Chart on December 12, 1992, and, one week later, peaked at number 6; it spent 9 weeks on the chart overall. According to Music Week magazine, over 136,800 copies of the single have been sold in the United Kingdom as of 2008. It spent three weeks at number 11 on Australia's ARIA Singles Chart and was later certified gold by the Australian Recording Industry Association (ARIA) for the shipment of 35,000 copies. The song debuted on the 27th position of New Zealand's chart on December 20, 1992, and peaked at number 9 two weeks later. It reached the first position in Italy. "Deeper and Deeper" reached the top 10 in several other countries, including Belgium, Denmark, Finland, and Ireland, as well as the top 30 in Austria, France, Germany, Iceland, Sweden, and Switzerland.

== Music video ==
=== Background and synopsis ===
Bobby Woods, an executive producer at Madonna's companies Boy Toy Inc. and Maverick films, directed the music video for "Deeper and Deeper". Filming took place from November 7–8, 1992, at Ren-Mar Studios and The Roxbury nightclub in Hollywood, California. Madonna portrays Andy Warhol protégé Edie Sedgwick. According to the director, the singer wanted to do an "Andy Warhol/Edie Sedgwick styled video. She believed, and I think this is accurate, that there was a similar feel to the times of America in the Roaring 20s and the Disco 70s." German actor Udo Kier, director Sofia Coppola, Madonna's personal friend Debi Mazar, porn director Chi Chi LaRue, porn performer Joey Stefano, music executives Seymour Stein and Guy Oseary, Ingrid Casares, actor and comedian Ray Walston, and Warhol Superstar Holly Woodlawn, all made cameos. Madonna asked former Warhol superstar Joe Dallesandro to participate in the video, but he turned down the offer. The dance sequences in the video were, according to Woods, "100% spontaneous. We loaded a dance floor with people, put her record on, and the dancing began."

Described as a "pastiche of 70s images", with scenes both in color and black and white, the video begins with a man (Kier) in a darkened room speaking German with subtitles in English: "Beware! Our idols and demons will pursue us. Until we learn to let them go!" Then, Madonna arrives at a nightclub driving a Mercedes-Benz W111 and looks for her lover - also played by Kier. At the nightclub, she leaves some balloons tied to the bar, which then begin to cut loose or burst. Interspersed footage of Madonna meeting and dancing with her friends, being photographed and watching a stripper (Stefano) perform, plays next. At the end, the man from the beginning cuts off the singer's remaining balloon with scissors.

=== Analysis and reception ===
The shot of Madonna and her girlfriends watching a stripper as they eat bananas was seen as a nod to the Andy Warhol-penned cover for The Velvet Underground & Nico.

Armond White wrote in The Resistance: Ten Years of Pop Culture that Shook the World (1995): "In the great 'Deeper and Deeper', Madonna combines historicism with her pop art consciousness [...] she goes back to the era of pervasive decadence, typified through 70s disco and Andy Warhol's advertising zenith." According to Guilbert, the video recreates "the atmosphere of the underground films of Warhol and Morrissey, particularly Flesh (1968) and Trash (1970)"; furthermore, he described Madonna's appearance as a mixture of Isadora Duncan, Dita Parlo, and Ingrid Thulin in La caduta degli dei (1969). Guilbert also pointed out references to Italian director Luchino Visconti, and actor John Travolta in the 1977 film Saturday Night Fever. The scene in which Madonna and her girlfriends watch Stefano perform while eating bananas was, according to Guilbert, a nod to the Warhol-penned cover art for The Velvet Underground & Nico (1967); he concluded that, with the inclusion of Stefano and La Rue, Madonna was comforting her own status as a gay icon. Matthew Rettenmund wrote that, despite being one of her "least admired videos, it's nonetheless creatively costumed and full of energy, even where it lacks cohesion or conceptual imagination. [...] It's lethargic narrative is unique among Madonna's videography". He further wrote that the scenes of the singer driving the car echoed "Burning Up" (1983), and singled out the "indulgent cameos".

The Los Angeles Times' Chris Willman compared the music video to a Redd Kross show, and critiqued Madonna for sporting the "most unattractive blond bob possible". He ultimately concluded: "The oddball mixture of corny nostalgic kitsch and druggy malevolence [in 'Deeper and Deeper'] is intriguing on the surface but, at its core, nothing but deep." Louis Virtel from The Backlot ranked it as the singer's 29th greatest video, and Nerdist's Eric Diaz her 12th; the latter writer felt the clip "perfectly captures the euphoric joy of just losing yourself in the beat on the dance floor". Julien Sauvalle from Out magazine considered "Deeper and Deeper" to be one of Madonna's "most stylish" music videos. Sal Cinquemani considered it "weird, dark, and alluring", as well as Madonna's 21st greatest music video. A negative review came from Italian author Francesco Falconi, who expressed that, despite being an "explicit homage" to Warhol, the video is not among Madonna's best. It can be found on Madonna's 2009 compilation Celebration: The Video Collection.

== Live performances ==
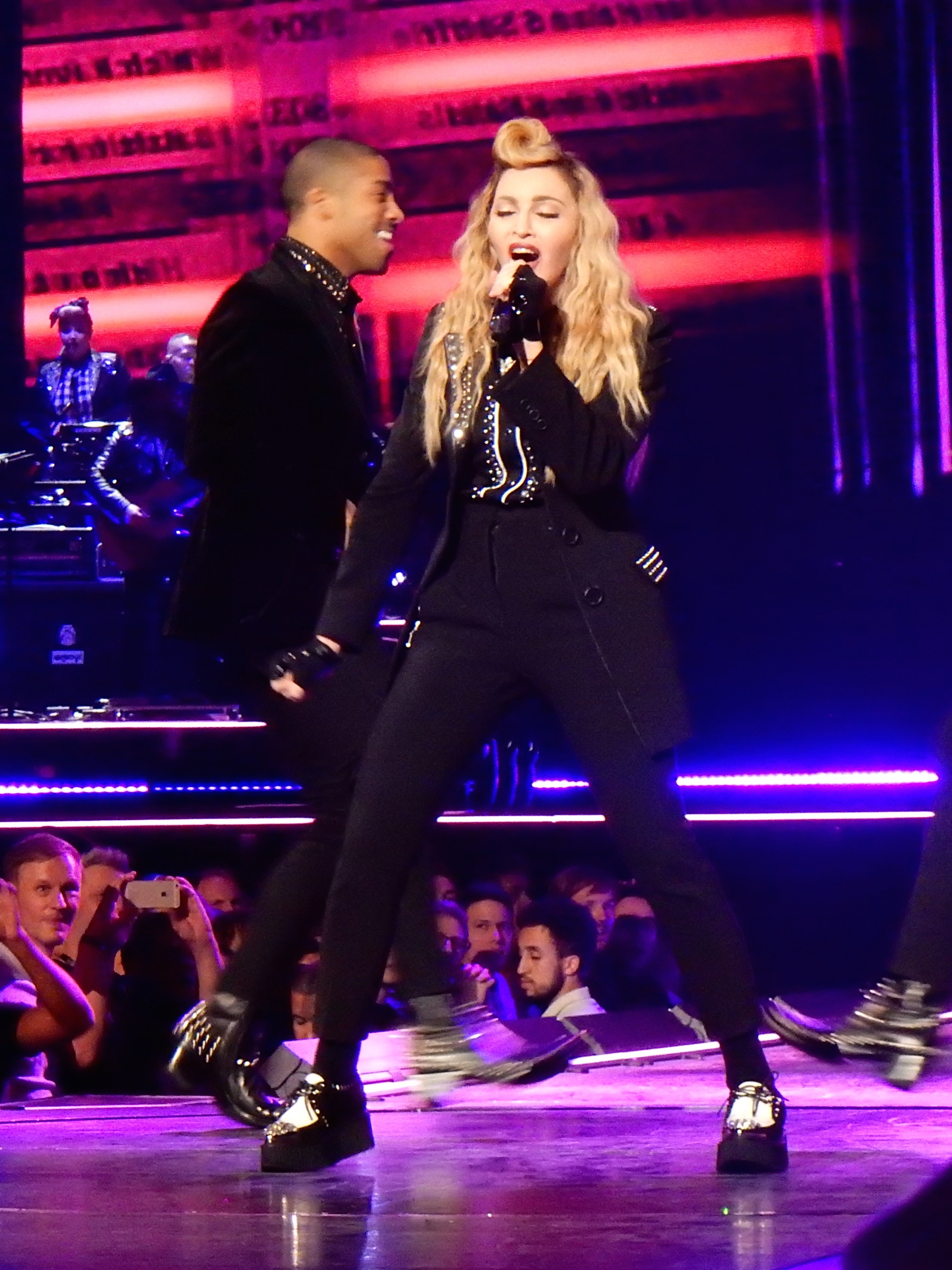
Madonna singing "Deeper and Deeper" on the Rebel Heart Tour (2015―2016)

"Deeper and Deeper" has been included on three of Madonna's concert tours: The Girlie Show (1993), Re-Invention (2004), and Rebel Heart (2015―2016). On the first one, it was sung after "Express Yourself" (1989); the stage was decked in Mylar curtains and glittering disco balls. Madonna wore a blond afro wig, 1970's style halters, and royal blue bell-bottom pants, a look that, according to Guilbert, was inspired by actress Marlene Dietrich in the 1932 film Blonde Venus. The performance began with a male member of the audience jumping onstage, trying to dance with a startled Madonna; he then ripped his tearaway pants, revealing himself as one of the concert's dancers. On his review of the concert at New York City's Madison Square Garden, Jon Pareles from The New York Times pointed out that the number was part of the "core of the show", which included songs about "freeing desire". The performance recorded on November 19, 1993, at the Sydney Cricket Ground, was included on The Girlie Show: Live Down Under home video release (1994).

On the Re-Invention World Tour, "Deeper and Deeper" was performed as a cabaret-style lounge number. Madonna wore a circus-themed outfit, consisting of black hot pants, red high heels, headband, and a red and white striped 1920s flapper style bustier. The staff of The Washington Times opined that the singer displayed "vocal nuances we didn’t know she had", while Kevin Naff from Southern Voice highlighted the "beautifully reworked" rendition. It was sung in its original form on the Rebel Heart Tour; the number featured line dancing and, on one point, a dancer carried Madonna in a piggyback style, while the backdrop screen showed a jukebox. Entertainment Weekly's Melissa Maerz noted that the song was infused with a "pulsing house undercurrent that felt contemporary again". The performance of "Deeper and Deeper" at the March 19–20, 2016 shows in Sydney's Allphones Arena was recorded and released on Madonna's fifth live album, Rebel Heart Tour (2017).

== Track listings and formats ==
- US 7-inch and cassette single; Japanese 3-inch CD
1. "Deeper and Deeper" (Album Edit) – 4:54
2. "Deeper and Deeper" (Instrumental) – 5:31
- US 12-inch and cassette maxi-single; UK 12-inch picture disc; European 12-inch maxi-single
1. "Deeper and Deeper" (Shep's Classic 12-inch) – 7:25
2. "Deeper and Deeper" (Shep's Deep Makeover Mix) – 9:09
3. "Deeper and Deeper" (Shep's Deep Beats) – 2:57
4. "Deeper and Deeper" (David's Klub Mix) – 7:38
5. "Deeper and Deeper" (David's Love Dub) – 5:35
6. "Deeper and Deeper" (Shep's Deeper Dub) – 6:08
- US CD maxi-single
1. "Deeper and Deeper" (Album Edit) – 4:54
2. "Deeper and Deeper" (Shep's Deep Makeover Mix) – 9:09
3. "Deeper and Deeper" (David's Klub Mix) – 7:40
4. "Deeper and Deeper" (Shep's Classic 12-inch) – 7:27
5. "Deeper and Deeper" (Shep's Fierce Deeper Dub) – 6:01
6. "Deeper and Deeper" (David's Love Dub) – 5:39
7. "Deeper and Deeper" (Shep's Deep Beats) – 2:58
- Digital single (2022)
1. "Deeper and Deeper" (Album Edit) – 4:54
2. "Deeper and Deeper" (Shep's Deep Makeover Mix) – 9:07
3. "Deeper and Deeper" (David's Klub Mix) – 7:39
4. "Deeper and Deeper" (Shep's Classic 12-inch) – 7:26
5. "Deeper and Deeper" (Shep's Fierce Deeper Dub) – 5:59
6. "Deeper and Deeper" (David's Love Dub) – 5:37
7. "Deeper and Deeper" (Shep's Deepstrumental) – 6:00
8. "Deeper and Deeper" (David's Deeper Dub) – 5:24
9. "Deeper and Deeper" (Shep's Deeper Dub) – 6:09
10. "Deeper and Deeper" (Shep's Deep Bass Dub) – 5:00
11. "Deeper and Deeper" (Shep's Deep Beats) – 2:58
12. "Deeper and Deeper" (Instrumental) – 5:34

== Credits and personnel ==
Credits are adapted from the album's liner notes.

- Madonna – lead vocals, songwriter, producer
- Shep Pettibone – songwriter, producer, sequencing, keyboard, programming
- Anthony Shimkin – songwriter, sequencing, keyboard, programming
- Joe Moskowitz – keyboards
- Paul Pesco – guitar
- Dennis Mitchell – recording engineer
- Robin Hancock – recording engineer
- George Karras – mixing engineer
- Donna De Lory – background vocals
- Niki Haris – background vocals

== Charts ==
=== Weekly charts ===
Weekly chart performance for "Deeper and Deeper"
Chart (1992–1993)	Peak position
Australia (ARIA)	11
Austria (Ö3 Austria Top 40)	30
Belgium (Ultratop 50 Flanders)	10
Canada Retail Singles (The Record)	1
Canada Top Singles (RPM)	2
Canada Contemporary Hit Radio (The Record)	2
Canada Adult Contemporary (RPM)	21
Canada Dance/Urban (RPM)	1
Denmark (IFPI)	8
Europe (European Hot 100 Singles)	9
Europe (European Dance Radio)	2
Finland (Suomen virallinen lista)	2
France (SNEP)	17
Germany (GfK)	26
Iceland (Íslenski Listinn Topp 40)	13
Ireland (IRMA)	7
Israel (Israeli Singles Chart)	3
Italy (Musica e dischi)	1
Netherlands (Dutch Top 40)	17
Netherlands (Single Top 100)	20
New Zealand (Recorded Music NZ)	9
Sweden (Sverigetopplistan)	22
Switzerland (Schweizer Hitparade)	23
UK Singles (Official Charts)	6
UK Airplay (Music Week)	2
UK Dance (Music Week)	2
UK Club Chart (Music Week)	15
US Billboard Hot 100	7
US Dance Club Songs (Billboard)	1
US Dance Singles Sales (Billboard)	1
US Pop Airplay (Billboard)	2
US Rhythmic Airplay (Billboard)	14
US Cash Box Top 100	6

=== Year-end charts ===
Chart (1992)	Position
UK Singles (OCC)	96

Chart (1993)	Position
Belgium (Ultratop 50 Flanders)	95
Canada Top Singles (RPM)	34
Canada Dance/Urban (RPM)	31
Netherlands (Dutch Top 40)	158
US Billboard Hot 100	66
US Dance Club Play (Billboard)	17
US Maxi-Singles Sales (Billboard)	28

=== Decade-end charts ===
Decade-end chart performance for "Deeper and Deeper"
Chart (1990–1999)	Position
Canada (Nielsen SoundScan)	71

== Certifications and sales ==
Certifications and sales for "Deeper and Deeper"
Region	Certification	Certified units/sales
Australia (ARIA)	Gold	35,000^{^}
United Kingdom	—	136,854
^{^} Shipments figures based on certification alone.

== See also ==
- List of number-one hits of 1992 (Italy)

== Bibliography ==
- Appignanesi, Richard; Garratt, Chris (2014). Introducing Postmodernism: A Graphic Guide. Icon Books Ltd Publishers. ISBN 978-1840468496.
- Bret, David (2015). Joey Stefano: The Life, Loves & Legacy of the Prince of Passion. Lulu. ISBN 978-1326195151.
- Burgess, Richard James (2013). The Art of Music Production: The Theory and Practice. Oxford University Press. ISBN 978-0-19-992172-0.
- Falconi, Francesco (2017). Mad for Madonna: La Regina del Pop. Babelcube Inc. ISBN 978-1-5071-7795-2.
- Ferguson, Michael (2011). Joe Dallesandro: Warhol Superstar, Underground Film Icon, Actor. Open Road Media. ISBN 978-0615525440.
- Guilbert, Georges-Claude (2002). Madonna as Postmodern Myth. McFarland. ISBN 0-7864-1408-1.
- Ichbiah, Daniel (2016). Les Chansons de Madonna. CreateSpace. ISBN 978-1501024795.
- Lenig, Stuart (2010). The Twisted Tale of Glam Rock. Praeger. ISBN 978-0313379864.
- Rettenmund, Matthew (1995). Encyclopedia Madonnica. St. Martin's Press. ISBN 0-312-11782-5.
- Rooksby, Rikky (2004). The Complete Guide to the Music of Madonna. Omnibus Press. ISBN 0-7119-9883-3.
- Ryan, Gavin (2011). Australia's Music Charts 1988-2010. Mt. Martha, VIC, Australia: Moonlight Publishing.
- Taraborrelli, Randy J. (2008). Madonna: An Intimate Biography. Simon & Schuster. ISBN 9780330454469.
- White, Armond (1995). The Resistance: Ten Years of Pop Culture That Shook the World. The Overlook Press. ISBN 9780879515867.
