= Erotica (album) =

1992 studio album by Madonna

Studio album by Madonna
- Released: October 19, 1992
- Recorded: 1991–1992
- Studios: Clinton Recording, Mastermix, Soundworks (New York)
- Genres: Dance-pop; deep house; hip hop; R&B
- Length: 75:24
- Labels: Maverick; Sire; Warner Bros.
- Producers: Madonna; Shep Pettibone; André Betts

Madonna chronology
The Immaculate Collection (1990)	Erotica (1992)	Bedtime Stories (1994)

Singles from Erotica
- 1. "Erotica" Released: September 29, 1992; 2. "Deeper and Deeper" Released: November 17, 1992; 3. "Bad Girl" Released: February 2, 1993; 4. "Fever" Released: March 22, 1993; 5. "Rain" Released: August 5, 1993; 6. "Bye Bye Baby" Released: November 15, 1993

Erotica is the fifth studio album by American singer and songwriter Madonna. It was released on October 19, 1992, by Maverick and Sire Records. The album was released simultaneously with Madonna's first book publication Sex, a coffee table book containing explicit photographs of the singer, and marked her first release under Maverick, her own multimedia entertainment company. For the album, the singer enlisted Shep Pettibone, with whom she had collaborated on 1990's "Vogue" and The Immaculate Collection, and André Betts.

In mid-1991, Pettibone sent Madonna a three-track demo; she listened to the songs and liked all of them. Afterward, the two met in New York City to start working on more music. The singer would write the melodies and lyrics on top of the music Pettibone produced in the style of his previous remixes. Erotica has been noted as a concept album about her alter–ego called Mistress Dita. With her, Madonna explores themes such as sadomasochism and sexual freedom in her coffee table book. In the album, the themes explored are mostly about sex and romance in times of HIV/AIDS, with songs that address "heavy" themes such as S&M and homophobia. Additionally, it marked a departure from the 1980s pop sound of Madonna's previous works, incorporating elements of hip-hop, R&B, house, and techno.

Upon release, it received mixed reviews from critics, who regarded it as one of Madonna's most adventurous albums. Others criticized its lyrics for being banal and felt the music was overshadowed by its sexual themes. Commercially, it charted number one in Australia, Brazil, Finland, and France, and peaked within the top five in Canada, Denmark, Germany, Ireland, Italy, Japan, New Zealand, Spain, Switzerland, the United Kingdom, and the United States. Erotica has sold more than six million copies worldwide.

Six singles were released from the album, including the title track and "Deeper and Deeper", both of which reached the top ten of the Billboard Hot 100. The album was supported by the Girlie Show, Madonna's fourth concert tour, which visited cities in Europe, the Americas, Australia, and Asia in 1993. Initially overlooked, partly because of the backlash surrounding the Sex book, Erotica has been retrospectively considered one of Madonna's most important albums, as well as one of the most revolutionary of all time by the Rock and Roll Hall of Fame. Many critics have since noted the influence of Erotica in later works by other female artists.

== Background ==
On April 21, 1992, it was reported that Madonna had teamed up with Time Warner Inc. to form Maverick, a multimedia entertainment company. Maverick consisted of a record company, a film production company, and associated music publishing, television broadcasting, book publishing, and merchandising divisions. The deal paid the singer an advance of $60 million and gave her 20% royalties from the music proceeds, one of the highest rates in the industry, equaled at that time only by Michael Jackson's royalty rate established a year earlier with Sony. Madonna described Maverick as "the perfect marriage of art and commerce", further adding that she envisioned it as an "artistic think tank", and likened it to a cross between the German arts institute Bauhaus and Andy Warhol's The Factory; "it started as a desire to have more control. There's a group of writers, photographers, directors and editors that I've met along the way in my career who I want to take with me everywhere I go. I want to incorporate them into my little factory of ideas", she explained. The first two projects from the venture were Madonna's fifth studio album and a coffee table book depicting her "erotic fantasies", titled Sex.

Madonna described the album as "soulful, with a jazzy undertone and a lot of beatnik-style poetry in it". Titled Erotica, the record saw the singer reunited with producer Shep Pettibone, with whom she had previously collaborated on "Vogue" and "Rescue Me" from The Immaculate Collection (1990). Alongside Pettibone, Madonna enlisted help from producer André Betts, who previously co-produced "Justify My Love" from The Immaculate Collection. She was interested in working with Pettibone and Betts because of their ability to remain plugged into the dance underground; "they come from opposite ends of the spectrum in terms of their music style and approach to music, but they're both connected to the street and they're still young and hungry".

== Development ==
"We were listening in my home studio to one of the first songs and I turned to her and said, 'It's great, but it's no 'Vogue'. She told me that not every song could be 'Vogue' [...] but I pressed my case anyway: 'I guess I'm always trying to out-top myself, the next thing should be bigger than the last'. Madonna just turned and looked me straight in the eye. She said, 'Shep, no matter how fierce something is, you can't ever do the same thing twice'".

— Producer Shep Pettibone on working with Madonna in Erotica.

Following the release of The Immaculate Collection, by mid-1991, Pettibone began working on new music: "I knew I could do something great after 'Vogue' and 'Rescue Me' so I just started putting tracks together with my assistant, Tony Shimkin", Pettibone recalled. He and Shimkin created a three-track demo and sent it to Madonna, who was in Chicago filming A League of Their Own; she listened to the songs and liked all of them. In October, after filming was complete, Madonna met Pettibone in New York City to start working on more demos. Anthony Shimkin recalled that the singer brought with her a "book full of lyrics and melody ideas". Pettibone created the music, and Madonna the lyrics. Shimkin would program a Macintosh computer to play percussion and synthesizer parts and transfer them to an eight-track recorder; then, Madonna would record her vocals. According to author Mark Bego, the first batch of songs they worked on were the title track, "Deeper and Deeper", "Bad Girl", "Thief of Hearts", and "Rain". Recording took place at New York's Soundworks Studios, Master Mix Studios, and Clinton Recording Studios. The producer described their work schedule as "sporadic", because Madonna split her time between other ventures: She was working with Steven Meisel on Sex and would sometimes leave for two weeks; occasionally, she would also meet with producer André Betts. At first, Madonna did not like the first group of songs she had recorded. According to Mark Landeros from Classic Pop, Pettibone's "glossy sheen and pristine production" were the antithesis of what Madonna envisioned for Erotica. She wanted it to have a "raw edge", as if it were recorded in an alley in Harlem.

Problems also arose during sequencing; computer processes would take too long and delay recordings. Pettibone had to keep things moving as fast as possible because he did not want Madonna to lose interest in the music. Also at this point, the music was getting "a little melancholy" and Madonna's lyrics and ideas "a lot more serious and intense". It was Pettibone's idea to write a song for Madonna's friend Martin Burgoyne who died of HIV/AIDS, and wrote the chords for "In This Life"; she wrote the lyrics in 15 minutes. The title track "Erotica" underwent "numerous radical changes" during the recording process, with four different versions being recorded; the singer would first sing it one way, and then decide to erase everything and start all over again. Shimkin affirmed that the original version was not "as slinky and sexy and grimy and dirty", until the mixing process; at that stage, the song was still an "experimentation", but when they realized it was going to be the lead single, it took on a "different, darker vibe". While recording Erotica, Madonna was also working on Sex; for the book, she incorporated a dominatrix alter-ego named Mistress Dita, heavily inspired by German actress Dita Parlo. After seeing the book, Pettibone suggested that the singer incorporate the dominatrix theme into the song's lyrics: "'You have all these great stories [in the book]', I told her, 'Why don't you use them in the song?'". Madonna left the studio with a copy of Sex, returned and recorded her vocals to "Erotica" in a "very dry" way; Pettibone then realized the song "would never be the same again". The chorus and bridge were changed entirely and the song's "psyche" became "sexier, more to the point".

"Some of the guys in the studio were asking if Madonna and me had done it — you know, had sex. I just started freestyling: I recorded one of the guys saying, 'Did you do it?' and then me saying, 'You know I did it'. Even though I didn't! [...] When she heard what I'd done, she laughed so hard she got tears in her eyes. A few days later, she called me and said she wanted the song on the album. I was like, 'No no no, Madonna, I'm not a rapper, I was just freestyling'. She put her manager on the phone and he explained that I was gonna get a very generous cut of the publishing. So I was like, OK, the song's on the record!".

— André Betts on "Did You Do It?".

For "Deeper and Deeper", Madonna wanted to have a flamenco guitar in the middle, an idea Pettibone disagreed with, but eventually gave in. He later decided to add castanets to "really take it there". According to Shimkin, while they were recording the song, Pettibone began singing some lines of "Vogue"; Madonna, who heard this and emulated it, liked the sound and decided to keep it. She later explained: "When we were actually recording, doing the final vocals, I just went off into that for a second because ['Vogue'] to me it's just one of those great kind of feel good dance songs." "Where Life Begins" was the first song for the album Madonna composed with André Betts, who was pleased with the song's explicit subject. The singer and Betts also worked together on "Waiting", which samples her vocals from "Justify My Love", and therefore was "an easy sell [to Madonna]". During a break from recording, Shimkin and Pettibone went on vacation to the Cayman Islands and Jamaica, respectively. Hearing a lot of reggae on their trips inspired them to write the music to "Why's It So Hard". "Did You Do It?" began as a joke; while Madonna was out, Betts began freestyling over the instrumental of "Waiting" after being asked if he'd ever been intimate with Madonna. The singer liked the result and decided to keep the track on the album.

"Fever"'s inclusion was a "happy accident". Madonna and Pettibone were working on "Goodbye to Innocence", a house song that talks about "living at the center of a controversial media storm", but, according to the singer, "[it] just wasn't working [...] the vibe wasn't right". When they decided to try and record the song one final time, Madonna started singing bits of Little Willie John's "Fever"; she had previously attended a Peggy Lee concert, and her rendition of the song had "made a strong impression on [me]". Pettibone liked how it sounded, and they decided to record a cover. The problem, however, was that neither of them knew the full lyrics. Madonna called Seymour Stein from Sire Records and, "within an hour, we had the lyric sheets, the Peggy Lee version, and the original version of the song in our hands". "Fever" was the last song to be recorded for Erotica.

== Composition ==
=== Sounds and themes ===
Author J. Randy Taraborrelli described Erotica as a "melting pot of nineties urban music — burgeoning hip-hop and house, partnered with a more conventional synthesizer-based rhythm and blues". It is a dance album that incorporates elements from classic disco, modern house, and techno. Additionally, it marked a departure from the "four-on-the-floor disco romp that listeners came to expect from [Madonna]", focusing instead on "heavy, cold [...] difficult and unpleasant" themes such as homophobia, queerness, female sex and sexuality, "not only in the hottest moments of physical relationships, but in their darker, more intimate instances, particularly in relation to the growing AIDS crisis", as noted by the Portland Mercury's Jeni Wren Strottup. It has been described as a concept album about Mistress Dita, her alter-ego in the album and in Sex, as a reminder, and mostly about looking for romance in a post-AIDS era.

=== Music and lyrics ===
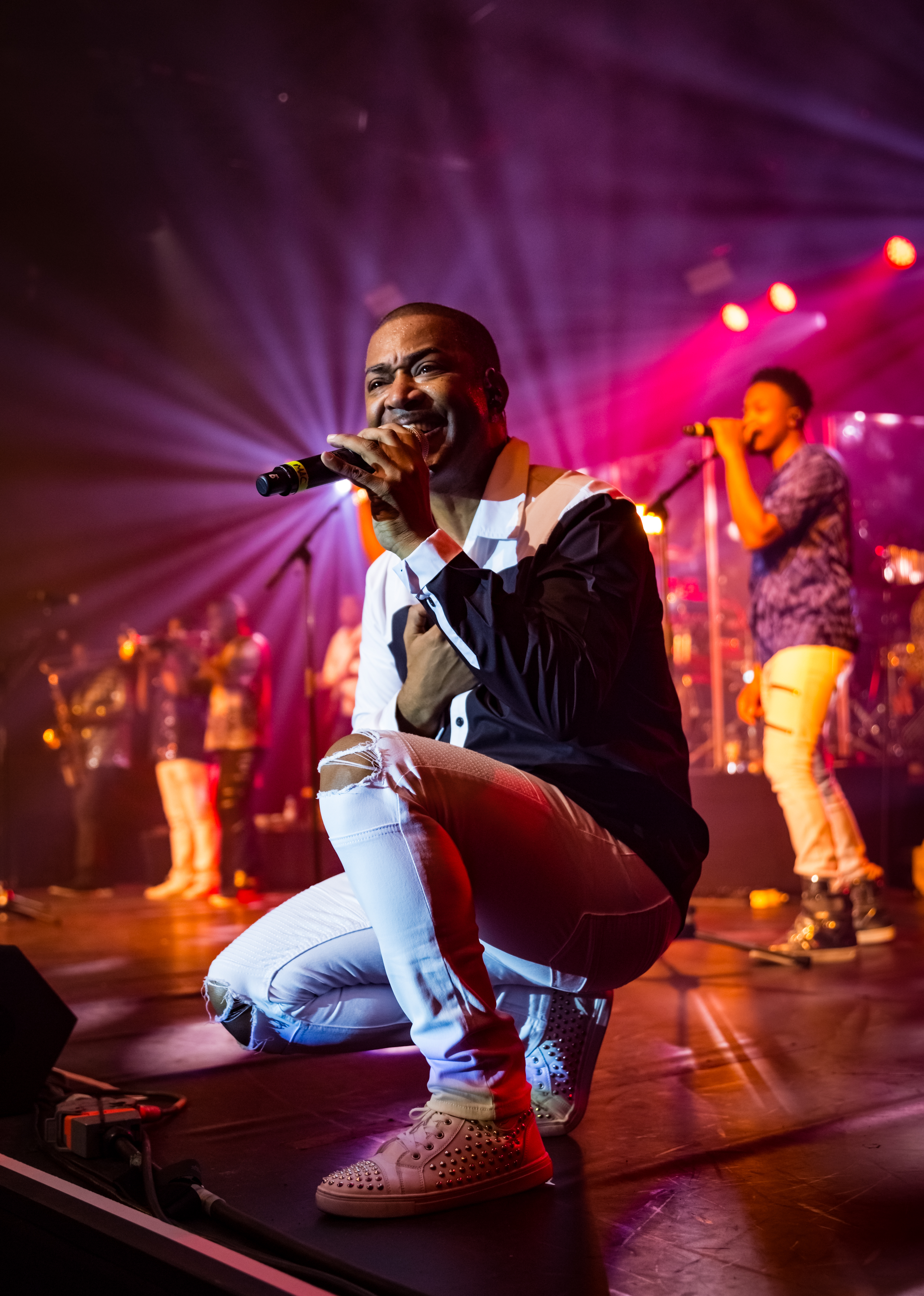
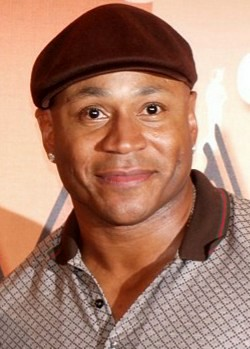
"Jungle Boogie" (1973) by Kool & the Gang (left) and LL Cool J's (right) "Jingling Baby" (1990) are sampled in "Erotica" and "Bye Bye Baby", respectively.

The opening track, "Erotica," is a pop hip-hop dance song with "scratchy, trip-hop loops" and Middle Eastern influences. Described by Pettibone as an "ode to S&M", the song continued Madonna's exploration of potent spoken-word vocals, which she had previously introduced in "Justify My Love", and samples Kool and the Gang's "Jungle Boogie" (1973), and "El Yom 'Ulliqa 'Ala Khashaba" by Lebanese singer Fairuz. It begins with a "put-a-record-on scratchiness" sound that mimics a record player. Madonna invites her lover to be submissive while she has sex with him, and suggests that he explore boundaries between pain and pleasure, demanding: Give it up, do what I say/ Give it up and let me have my way. Madonna's cover of "Fever" follows "Erotica"; it is an "apathetic house thumper" with "[her] airy deadpan [vocals] floating listlessly over the pulsing beats". It removes the chord movement from the original and has additional lyrics about Pocahontas, marimbas, and finger snaps at certain parts. The third track, "Bye Bye Baby," is a techno pop song that samples LL Cool J's "Jingling Baby" (1990), and opens with Madonna stating, This is not a love song. Her voice is filtered to sound like it is being projected "through an old-fashioned Victrola", while the lyrics talk about taking control rather than exacting revenge on a domineering, mind-game-playing partner. The track ends with an explosion and the singer saying you fucked it up, which is bleeped out.

Described as the album's "pure disco" moment, "Deeper and Deeper" has a "thicker arrangement" than the rest of the songs. The opening phrase When you know the notes to sing, you can sing most anything references "Do-Re-Mi" from The Sound of Music (1959). Its lyrics talk about sexual desire, but Dan Cadan argued in his text in the liner notes of Madonna's 2001 compilation GHV2, that they are actually about a young man coming to terms with his homosexuality. The song also features "a juxtaposition of swirling disco synths", a flamenco guitar, and castanets on its bridge. Toward the end, it includes a line from "Vogue": Let your body move to the music. Set to a "jazzy, juicy" groove, with lyrics about the "finger-licking good" pleasures of cunnilingus, "Where Life Begins" includes long sustained strings, and wah-wah guitars in its instrumentation. Madonna sings that it is something every girl should experience. Considered Erotica's "most overtly sexual track", it is the only one to reference safe sex: I’m glad you brought your raincoat/I think it's beginning to rain. The lyrics to sixth track "Bad Girl" talk, in the singer's own words, about a woman in a toxic relationship, trying to "distract herself from reality" through behaviors such as drinking and chain smoking. Instrumentation is provided by swing piano and wind chimes, with Madonna singing some parts in a falsetto. "Waiting" begins with the sound of a scratchy old vinyl before a sliding bass note. It is a "brooding ballad noir" with spoken word elements, in which a scorned and defiant Madonna faces up to the lover who has broken her heart, and samples her own "Justify My Love"; lyrics include Don’t go breaking my heart like you said you would, and I wish I could believe you or at least have the courage to leave you.

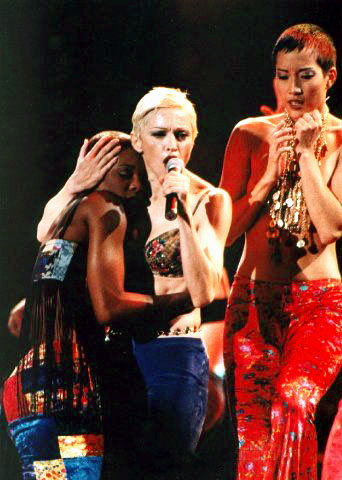
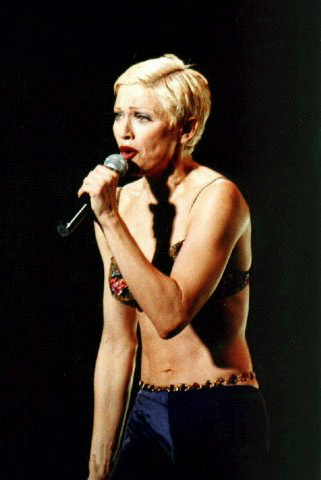
Madonna performing "Why's It So Hard" (left) and "In This Life" (right) on the Girlie Show. The former has influences of reggae, while the latter was written as a tribute to the friends the singer lost to HIV/AIDS.

"Thief of Hearts" is a "dark, rumbling" and "smug" track that echoes the Angels' "My Boyfriend's Back" (1963), and Blondie's "Rip Her to Shreds" (1977). It opens with the sound of smashing glass, and sees Madonna using "tough hip-hop language" such as Bitch!/Which leg do you want me to break? to attack and ward off a "cuckolding" rival, referred to only as "Little Susie Ho-Maker". The ninth track, "Words," begins with an "atmospheric" G♯ chord, which is followed by the sound of drum machine. Its "sharp" lyrics find the singer lashing back at a lover who "won her with romantic letters, then used the same verbal skills to manipulate and humiliate her"; also present in the song are "typewriter-esque effects", and Pettibone's "clattering programs and icy synth block-chords". The next song, "Rain," has been described as an "optimistic" New Age ballad, comparable to the work of Peter Gabriel. It features two spoken parts, "thunder-claps of percussion", a crescendo toward the end, and lyrics that compare rain to the idea of being in love.

In the reggae-infused "Why's It So Hard", Erotica's "vulnerable plea for solidarity", Madonna specifically asks: Why's it so hard to love one another?/What am I gonna do with all this anger/ Why do I have to fight? It has a "heavy" bass line, a piano break, and a coda, where the artist sings the phrase before it's too late. The twelfth track, "In This Life," is a slow song with orchestral arrangements, and samples George Gershwin's blues lullaby "Prelude No. 2" (1926). Madonna talks about the gay friends she has lost to AIDS, including Martin Burgoyne, her dance teacher and mentor Christopher Flynn, and artist Keith Haring. Lines sung include, Have you ever watched your best friend die? [...] Someday I pray it will end/I hope it's in this life/I hope it's in this lifetime. At one point, Madonna "bitterly" wonders, Who determines, who knows best?/Is there a lesson I'm supposed to learn? The song's drums have been likened to a doomsday Clock, and its refrain recalls that of the Beatles' 1965 song "In My Life". The penultimate track, "Did You Do It?," is a "raunchy" rap song, in which guest rappers Mark Goodman and Dave Murphy tell their "disbelieving friends" about their sexual conquest of Madonna, who sings and repeats the phrase waiting for you. The closing track, "Secret Garden," features instrumentation from "shuffling drums, rolling bass and jazzy piano". A "hymn to the singer’s vagina", its lyrics conjure up imagery of flowers, roses, thorns, lovers, and rainbows.

== Artwork and release ==
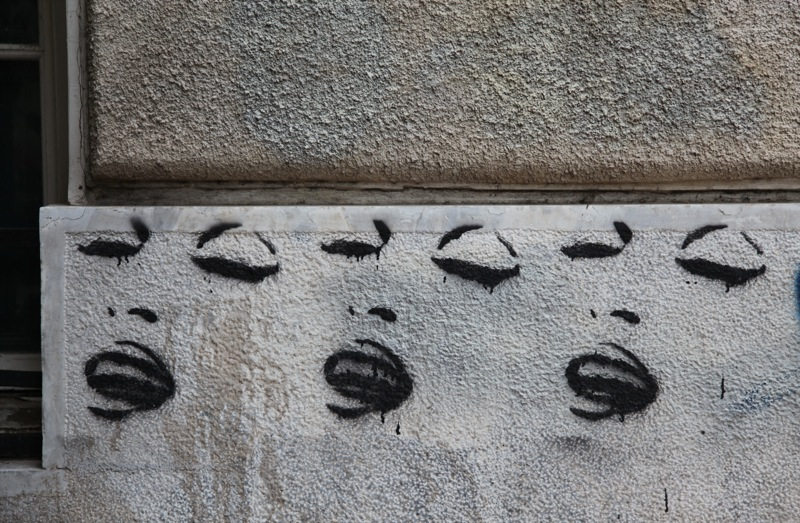
Urban art in Athens, Greece inspired by the cover artwork of Erotica

The artwork for Erotica was created by Steven Meisel, under the artistic direction of Baron & Baron Inc., consisting of Fabien Baron and photographer Siung Fat Tjia, who also oversaw the packaging and design of Sex. The cover follows the "same monochromatic blue-ink cover shot" that had been used on the book, and shows Madonna's "faded" face on a pale background. Photographs used for Sex were also included on the album's booklet; one shows Madonna in S&M garb, wielding a riding crop and licking her arm; another one features her bound and gagged. The back cover shows the singer engaging in "foot worship – blissfully sucking on someone's big toe", as noted by J. Randy Taraborrelli. According to the author, "listeners did not need to hear the music to understand Madonna's intention with Erotica. If the title itself was not a tip-off, the CD's cover artwork certainly made the point clear". Mark Bego, in his book Madonna: Blonde Ambition, was not fond of the "off-putting" picture, and felt it was "a bit too much, even for her fans". Billboard's Melinda Newman saw similarities between Erotica's artwork and that of the Darling Buds' album of the same name, which was released two weeks before Madonna's. Mark Elliott of This is Dig! said it is one of Madonna's "most provocative" album covers.

Erotica was released on October 19, 1992, in the United Kingdom and on October 20, 1992, in the US through Madonna's Maverick label. It was the singer's first release to bear the Parental Advisory label because of explicit content in tracks such as "Did You Do It?", and was therefore banned in several Asian countries, such as China and Singapore. Two versions of Erotica were released: a clean 13-track version that omits "Did You Do It?", and the complete 14-track version that bears the Parental Advisory label.

== Promotion ==
On October 22, 1992, MTV aired a special called The Day in Madonna, hosted by Kurt Loder, which profiled the release of both Sex and Erotica. New York City's HMV music store held a Madonna look-alike contest, and set up a booth where people could view Sex for one dollar a minute. All the proceeds went to Lifebeat, the music industry organization founded to help fund AIDS research.

=== Media appearances and tour ===
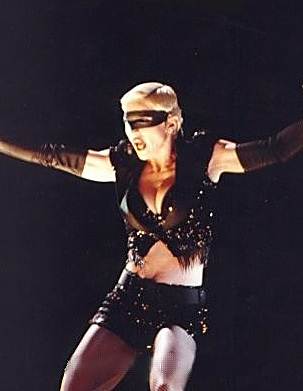
Madonna performing lead single and title track "Erotica" as the opening number of the Girlie Show

On January 16, 1993, Madonna appeared on late-night live television show Saturday Night Live and sang "Bad Girl" and "Fever". The singer also appeared on the 1,000th episode of The Arsenio Hall Show, and sang "Fever" in its original version. She also performed "The Lady Is a Tramp" (1937) alongside Anthony Kiedis; they wore matching skirts, stockings, leather vests, cat-ear caps and lipstick. On September 2, 1993, Madonna opened the MTV Video Music Awards with a burlesque-themed performance of "Bye Bye Baby". The "risqué" number saw the singer in a tailcoat and top hat, with three scantily clad women, and included "stroked inner-thighs, spanks, [and] frottage".

Erotica was further promoted on the Girlie Show, Madonna's fourth concert tour. Seen as an attempt to "revive" her musical career after the critical and commercial failure of Body of Evidence, an erotic thriller in which she starred, it began in London on September 25, 1993, and ended in Tokyo on December 19. It was initially planned not to visit the United States, instead focusing on regions the singer had never toured before, such as Turkey, Israel, Mexico, Puerto Rico, South America and Australia. However, because of demand, some shows were booked in certain US cities. Madonna opened the show dressed as a dominatrix surrounded by topless dancers, while lighter moments included her descending from the ceiling on a giant disco ball wearing an Afro wig for "Express Yourself" (1989), as well as singing "Like a Virgin" (1984) in the guise of actress Marlene Dietrich. The tour received generally positive reviews from critics and was commercially successful, with a gross of $70 million from 39 concerts. Several organizations in different countries protested to force the cancellation of the concerts because of their explicit sexual nature. In Puerto Rico, Madonna passed the island's flag between her legs on stage, resulting in outrage among Puerto Rican society; Orthodox Jews staged protests to force the cancellation of the concerts in Tel Aviv to no avail.

=== Singles ===
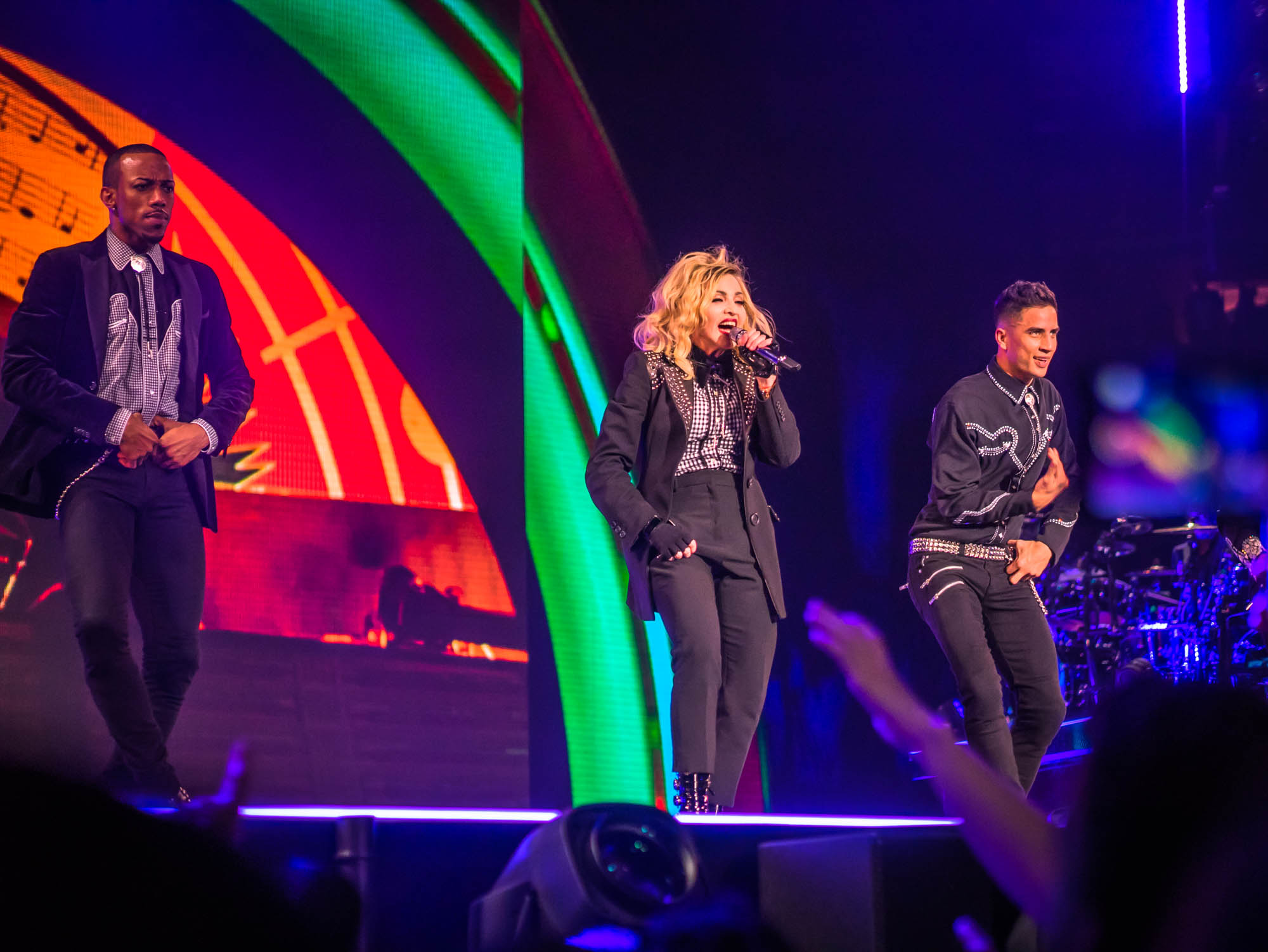
Madonna singing second single "Deeper and Deeper" during 2015–2016's Rebel Heart Tour. The track peaked at number seven on the Billboard Hot 100.

In Australia and most European countries, the title track "Erotica" was released as the album's lead single on September 29, 1992; in the United States, it was released on October 13. It was met with generally positive reviews from critics, with some deeming it one of Madonna's darkest and most experimental songs. It performed well commercially, debuting at number 13 on the US Billboard Hot 100—becoming one of the highest debuts in the chart's history at the time—and peaking at number three. It also saw success on the Hot Dance Club Play chart, where it reached number one. Its accompanying music video was directed by Fabien Baron, and features scenes of Madonna dressed as a masked dominatrix interspersed with footage of the making of Sex; it was highly controversial, being aired by MTV only three times, all after the 10pm watershed, before being completely banned.

"Deeper and Deeper" was issued in Australia and Europe as second single on November 17, whereas in the US, the release date was December 8. Critics lauded it for being more dance-oriented than "Erotica", with some comparing it to the work of Donna Summer. It fared well commercially, reaching the seventh spot of the Billboard Hot 100. The music video was directed by Bobby Woods, and was seen as a homage to American artist Andy Warhol and Italian director Luchino Visconti; Madonna plays a character based on Edie Sedgwick, who goes out to a nightclub to meet her friends and boyfriend.

Erotica's third single was "Bad Girl"; like its predecessors, it was first published in Australia and Europe on February 2, 1993. In the United States, it was released one month later with "Fever" as B-side. Critics reacted positively to the track, with some noting a departure from Madonna's highly sexual image of the time. The song had a lukewarm reception on the charts: it became Madonna's first single to not reach the top 30 or top 20 of the Hot 100, breaking a streak of 27 consecutive top 20 singles that began with "Holiday" (1983) and ended with "Deeper and Deeper". "Bad Girl"'s music video was directed by David Fincher; in it, Madonna plays Louise Oriole, a successful but promiscuous Manhattan businesswoman who engages in one-night stands with multiple men, until one of them murders her. Christopher Walken plays her beleaguered guardian angel. The clip was acclaimed by critics, who deemed it one of Madonna's best.

"Fever" was released as the album's fourth single outside North America on March 28, 1993. Despite not being published as an official single in the US, "Fever" reached the top spot of Billboard's Hot Dance Club Play chart. In the United Kingdom, it reached the chart's sixth position. The song received generally positive to mixed reviews from critics; Madonna's vocal performance was compared both positively and negatively to that of Lee's. The music video was directed by Stéphane Sednaoui, and was Madonna's first to use chroma key. In Australia and most European countries "Rain" was released as Erotica's fifth single on July 17, 1993. In the US, it was the fourth and final single, released on August 5. Critics referred to "Rain" as one of the best songs in Erotica, and one of Madonna's best ballads. In the visual, directed by Mark Romanek, Madonna is seen during a film shoot, with Japanese composer Ryuichi Sakamoto playing the director alongside a Japanese film crew. "Rain" peaked at number 14 on US Hot 100, and at 7 on the UK. The sixth and final single was "Bye Bye Baby", released only in Australia on November 15, 1993, to coincide with Madonna's visit to the country with the Girlie Show. It reached number 15 on the chart.

== Critical reception ==
Contemporaneous reviews
Review scores
Source	Rating
Chicago Sun-Times	2.5/4 stars
Entertainment Weekly	C+
Los Angeles Times	2/4 stars
Music Week	3/4 stars
Q	3/5 stars
Rolling Stone	4/5 stars
The Village Voice	A

Retrospective reviews and music guides
Review scores
Source	Rating
AllMusic	3/5 stars
Blender	4/5 stars
MusicHound Rock	3/5 stars
Pitchfork	9.0/10
The Rolling Stone Album Guide	4/5 stars
Slant Magazine	4/5 stars
Spin Alternative Record Guide	4/10
Tom Hull – on the Web	A−
The Virgin Encyclopedia of Nineties Music	3/5 stars

Erotica received mixed reviews. AllMusic's Stephen Thomas Erlewine said it was an "ambitious" album, that contains "some of Madonna's best and most accomplished music". From The Daily Telegraph, James Hall opined Erotica is a "venturous epic that was eclipsed by the audacity of the idea that spawned it", even if it's not Madonna's best album. Mark Elliott from website This is Dig! called Erotica a "more noble" concept album than I'm Breathless (1990). Matthew Rettenmund, author of Encyclopedia Madonnica, deemed it Madonna's best, and J. Randy Taraborrelli her "most promiscuous". To the staff of Billboard, "La M's first studio outing since 1989's Like a Prayer [...] is her most varied and creatively challenging collection to date". Less positively, Charlotte Robinson from PopMatters referred to Erotica as the "first disappointment of [Madonna's] seemingly enchanted career".

One element focused on by critics such as J. D. Considine, from The Baltimore Sun, was the sexual and romantic themes. Some critics acclaimed the presentation of them as raw and harshly realistic elements that justified the singer's unpolished and amateur vocals, and unexpectedly found the songs to be more about the pains of romance than sex. (Note: Per multiple sources) Other critics argued the sexual display was excessive, for some critics at the expense of musical depth. Mark Bego expressed a mixed view, deeming it "artistic yet suggestive, some of it is genuinely sexy, and some of it is lewd and musically unappealing". Barbara Walker of the Sun-Sentinel complained that the overtly sexual tone made the album uninteresting because of its frequency in Madonna's public image at the time. Additionally, she said it was "loaded with just enough rootless shock value to rile her critics". Richard Harrington from the Washington Post likened the record to a number from Bob Fosse's All That Jazz (1979), in which "dancers-as-nearly-naked stewards and stewardesses say, as they explore all manner of sexual coupling before a small, shocked audience of potential investors, 'Our motto is we take you everywhere but get you nowhere'".

The music and sound were also a source of division. According to Daryl Easley, in his book Madonna: Blond Ambition, Erotica showcases the continuation of Madonna's "musical maturity". Conversely, reviewers such as Stephen Holden considered the lack of an upbeat, joyous vibe to be a downside for the dance style. Tom Ford, from the Toledo Blade, was the only critic to dismiss the musical styles as "recycled" from Madonna's previous albums. Priya Elan from NME expressed that, "ditching Patrick Leonard for Shep Pettiborn [sic] was a bold move that didn't wholly pay off. The hard house beats of Erotica may have reflected the sexually explicit lyrical content brilliantly on tracks like 'Deeper And Deeper' and 'Thief Of Hearts', but over a whole album it seemed a bit much". Both Entertainment Weekly's David Browne and Slant Magazine's Sal Cinquemani reacted negatively to Madonna's vocals: the former deemed them "soulless", and the latter "nasal and remote".

The instrumental parts of the songs was praised by some writers, however. The Quietus' Matthew Barton called it a non-commercial but "intoxicating cocktail of house, samples, jazz, [and] trip-hop", an elevated version of the "'full-length piece of art' modus operandi" of Like a Prayer. Billboard's Larry Flick described the tracklist as consisting of "intelligent, pensive tunes and tough, dance/hip-hop jams" that "comes across like a conscious return" to Madonna's club origins. For The Buffalo News' Anthony Violanti, it is a "remarkable and engrossing album laced with tight, funky dance beats and some surprisingly moving songs".

== Commercial performance ==
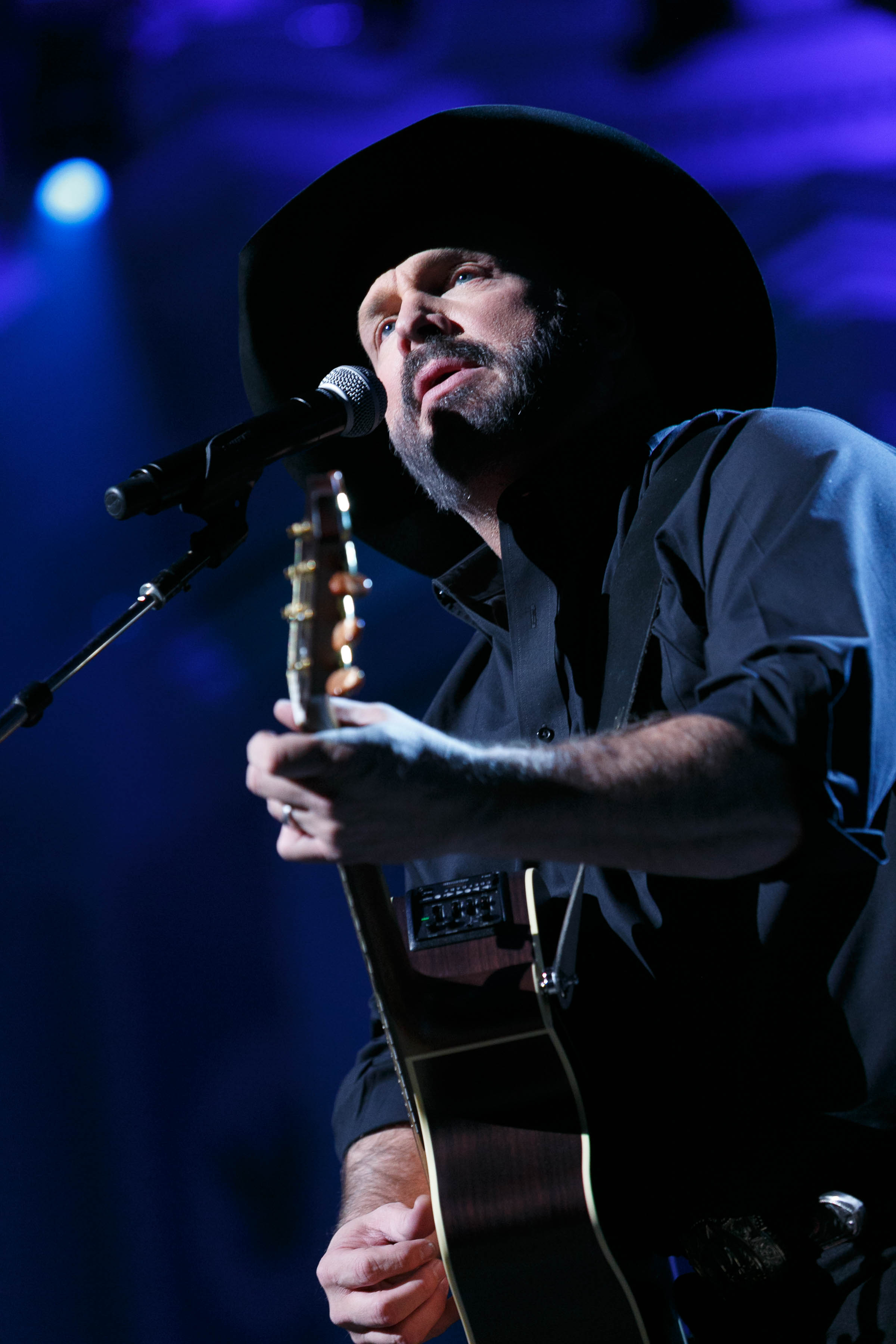
The Chase by Garth Brooks (picture) kept Erotica from the Billboard 200's first spot.

In the United States, Erotica debuted at number two on the Billboard 200 on November 7, 1992, with first week sales of 167,000 copies. The Chase by Garth Brooks kept it from the top spot; Erotica was Madonna's first studio album since her 1983 debut to not top the chart. The following week, the album dropped to number four on the chart. In January 1993, it was certified double platinum by the Recording Industry Association of America (RIAA) for shipments of two million units. According to Nielsen SoundScan, Erotica has sold 1.91 million copies in the United States as of December 2016, along with 79,000 sold through BMG Music Clubs. In Canada, Erotica debuted at number seven on the RPM Albums Chart on November 7, 1992; it peaked at number four on November 21, spent 38 weeks on the chart and was certified double platinum by Music Canada (MC) for shipments of 200,000 copies. In Argentina, the album received four-times platinum from the Cámara Argentina de Productores de Fonogramas y Videograma (CAPIF) for shipments of 240,000 copies. Similarly in Mexico, Erotica achieved sales of 250,000 units according to Billboard. The album received a gold certification from Pro-Música Brasil, denoting shipments of 100,000 units. Sales in Brazil stand at 180,000 copies, as of October 1993.

Across Europe, Erotica sold 1.5 million copies in its first week, and reached the top of the European Top 100 Albums chart. In the United Kingdom, the album debuted at number two on the UK Albums Chart on October 24, 1992. It remained at that position for three weeks, held off the top by Simple Minds' greatest hits collection Glittering Prize 81/92, and spent a total of 38 weeks on the chart. The album was certified double platinum on June 1, 1993, by the British Phonographic Industry (BPI) for shipments of 600,000 copies. In France, the album debuted at number one on the French Albums Chart on October 28, 1992, stayed there for two weeks before descending the chart and selling a total of 250,000 copies by May 1993. In Germany, the album reached the top five on the Media Control Charts and was certified gold for shipments of 250,000 copies. In Italy, Erotica sold 250,000 copies in its presales. In Sweden, the album debuted and peaked at number six and spent seven weeks on the chart. Similarly in Switzerland, Erotica peaked at number five and was certified gold by IFPI Switzerland. It also received a platinum certification in Spain and sold 150,000 units there as of 1993. 350 copies were sold in Iceland during November 1992.

In Australia, the album entered the ARIA chart at number 159, before climbing to number one in its second week, and was certified triple platinum by the Australian Recording Industry Association (ARIA) for shipments of 210,000 copies. It also reached the top five on the New Zealand Albums Chart. Erotica reached a peak of number five on the Japan Oricon Albums Chart, and received a double platinum certification from the Recording Industry Association of Japan (RIAJ) for shipping 400,000 copies. At the 7th annual Japan Gold Disc Awards, Madonna was awarded the RIAJ's Artist of the Year with sales totaling ¥844 million throughout the year, an equivalent of $6.5 million ($14.49 million in 2025 dollars) Erotica was honored as 1992's Top Selling English Album by Radio Television Hong Kong (RTHK). Initial shipments of the album in Singapore totaled 20,000 units, but quickly sold 37,000 copies, becoming Warner Music's best-selling album of 1992 in Singapore. In total, Erotica has sold more than six million copies worldwide.

== Legacy ==
Erotica has been referred to as one of Madonna's best and most important albums. In 2017, the Rock and Roll Hall of Fame considered it one of the most revolutionary albums of all time, writing that, "few women artists, before or since Erotica, have been so outspoken about their fantasies and desires. [Madonna] made it clear that shame and sexuality are mutually exclusive [...] [Erotica] remains one of the boldest expressions of female sexuality". Kurt Loder added that, although she wasn't the first female artist to "exploit sexiness", with Erotica and Sex, Madonna "set a template for what women could get away with". Influence of Erotica can be seen in the work of contemporary female artists such as Britney Spears, Beyoncé, Janet Jackson, Christina Aguilera, Lady Gaga, Nicki Minaj, Miley Cyrus, Ariana Grande, Lana Del Rey, Cardi B, and Kim Petras. With the album, Joe Lynch from Billboard held that Madonna "set the blueprint for singers to get raw", while for Chuck Arnold it "forever sexed-up pop music". USA Today's Edward Segarra felt it "helped expand female expression, usher in 'confessional' style". Similarly, Reece Shrewsbury deemed it "a huge step for women's sexual liberation".

"Erotica was the start of Madonna's newest era of being honest and true to her womanhood, counterpointed by the release of a companion book, Sex [...] While it marks the end of the pinnacle of her fame, it set the stage for empowered pop artists like Beyoncé and Britney, de-stigmatizing the bedroom and expanding the possibilities for women in pop. [Erotica] lives today as a reminder of the true fearlessness that made Madonna an icon".

— Jeni Wren Strottup commenting on the album and its influence.

According to Taraborrelli, at the time of Erotica's release, "much of society seemed to be reexamining its sexuality. Gay rights issues were at the forefront of social discussions globally, as was an ever-increasing awareness of AIDS". In this vein, Eric Henderson from Slant Magazine referred to it as a record that "[r]evealed a full understanding of the bipolarity of the gay experience circa AIDS". Attitude's Joseph Ryan-Hicks concluded that, "although Erotica was provocative, at its core were messages of safe sex and liberation at a time when people needed to hear them the most". Through the album, Madonna was able to advocate for AIDS awareness and help bring the epidemic into the public discourse, according to Stereogum's Mary Von Aue. From the Evening Standard, El Hunt wrote: "Both Erotica and Sex came out at a time when certain kinds of sex –specifically queer sex– were steeped in debilitating amounts of shame and fear [...] By putting forward a vision of sexual exploration that often feels cold, detached, and uneasy, Madonna flawlessly captured the emotional disconnect of searching out an intimacy that has suddenly become deadly". Sal Cinquemani elaborated:

By 1992, Madonna was an icon —untouchable, literally and figuratively— and Erotica was the first time the artist's music took on a decidedly combative, even threatening tone, and most people didn't want to hear it. [Erotica's] irrefutable unsexiness probably says more about the sex=death mentality of the early '90s than any other musical document of its time. This is not Madonna at her creative zenith. This is Madonna at her most important, at her most relevant. No one else in the mainstream at that time dared to talk about sex, love, and death with such frankness and fearlessness.

Erotica was named "one of the biggest affronts to white, Christian, middle-class America ever to appear in pop music" by the staff of Gay Times. Its biggest achievement, according to Rolling Stone's Barry Walters, is "the embrace of the Other, which in this case means queerness, blackness, third-wave feminism, exhibitionism and kink. Madonna took what was marginalized at the worst of the AIDS epidemic, placed it in an emancipated context, and shoved it into the mainstream for all to see and hear". Joe Lynch concluded: "If her earlier work was an invitation to celebrate sexuality without shame, Erotica was a challenge [...] to witness and perhaps even indulge in society’s sexual taboos. Madonna may have addressed the male gaze before, but on Erotica, she wasn’t just staring back – she was making the world her sub". Brian McNair, the author of Striptease Culture: Sex, Media and the Democratization of Desire, stated that upon the album's release, "academic books began to appear about the 'Madonna phenomenon', while pro- and anti-porn feminists made of her a symbol of all that was good or bad (depending on their viewpoint) about contemporary sexual culture".

According to Slant Magazine, "no Madonna album was ever met with a louder backlash or was more rampantly misrepresented" than Erotica. Taraborrelli commented that it is unfortunate that the album has to be historically linked to other "less memorable ventures" in the singer's career, such as Sex and Body of Evidence, as it has "true value". When asked to name her biggest professional disappointment, Madonna answered: "The fact that my Erotica album was overlooked because of the whole thing with the [Sex] book. It just got lost in all that. I think there's some brilliant songs on it and people didn't give it a chance". Writing for Stylus Magazine, Alfred Soto felt Erotica "proved too sophisticated for a mainstream besotted with The Bodyguard and a college-radio claque eager to praise R.E.M.'s opaque dirges". This sentiment was echoed by Reece Shrewsbury, who added that the general public "just wasn't ready to see a pop star who once had a clean image in such provocative positions". Musician Doug Wimbish referred to Erotica as "ahead of its time", and applauded Madonna for being "enough of an artist to take the hues and shades of what's happening and put a concept together [...] She had Maverick, she'd done the [Sex] book, the film Dick Tracy, she dated a big-ass Hollywood actor (Warren Beatty). [Erotica] was her first record with her concept. She turned the system upside down for a moment, and they had to deal with the shock and awe of it all". Brian McNair added that, by "dabbling in the pornosphere" with Sex and Erotica, Madonna took a financial risk with her career, and it wasn't until the release of 1998's Ray of Light that her record sales went back to "pre-Erotica" levels; nonetheless, the author concluded that, "what she lost in royalty payments, [she] more than made up for in iconic status and cultural influence". From music portal Albumism, Justin Chadwick wrote: "Erotica was, is, and will forever be a fearlessly fierce album that only Madonna could make. No one has ever come close to replicating it and no one ever will".

In late January 2026, "Thief of Hearts" experienced a sudden surge on the streaming social media platform because of the bridge of the song, Tik Tok, with app users making dances, fashion edits and eventually leading to Madonna joining in by posting images and dances on her social media pages in support of the resurgence.

== Track listing ==
Erotica track listing
No.	Title	Writer(s)	Producer(s)	Length
1.	"Erotica"	Madonna; Shep Pettibone; Anthony Shimkin	Madonna; Pettibone	5:20
2.	"Fever"	John Davenport; Eddie Cooley	Madonna; Pettibone	5:00
3.	"Bye Bye Baby"	Madonna; Pettibone; Shimkin	Madonna; Pettibone	3:56
4.	"Deeper and Deeper"	Madonna; Pettibone; Shimkin	Madonna; Pettibone	5:33
5.	"Where Life Begins"	Madonna; Andre Betts	Madonna; Betts	5:57
6.	"Bad Girl"	Madonna; Pettibone; Shimkin	Madonna; Pettibone	5:23
7.	"Waiting"	Madonna; Betts	Madonna; Betts	5:46
8.	"Thief of Hearts"	Madonna; Pettibone; Shimkin	Madonna; Pettibone	4:51
9.	"Words"	Madonna; Pettibone; Shimkin	Madonna; Pettibone	5:55
10.	"Rain"	Madonna; Pettibone	Madonna; Pettibone	5:25
11.	"Why's It So Hard"	Madonna; Pettibone; Shimkin	Madonna; Pettibone	5:23
12.	"In This Life"	Madonna; Pettibone	Madonna; Pettibone	6:23
13.	"Did You Do It?"	Madonna; Betts	Madonna; Betts	4:54
14.	"Secret Garden"	Madonna; Betts	Madonna; Betts	5:32
Total length:				75:24

=== Notes ===
- "Erotica" samples "Jungle Boogie" (1973), recorded by Kool and the Gang, and written by Robert Earl Bell, Ronald Nathan Bell, Donald Boyce, George Melvin Brown, Robert Spike Mickens, Claydes Charles Smith, Clifford Adams and Dennis Thomas. It also samples "El Yom 'Ulliqa 'Ala Khashaba", performed by Fairuz.
- "Fever" contains lyrics written and rearranged by singer Peggy Lee, who remains uncredited for her contribution.
- Anthony Shimkin has been officially added by ASCAP as a co-writer to "Erotica", "Bye Bye Baby", "Bad Girl", "Thief of Hearts", "Words", and "Why's It So Hard". Inlay notes to the album do not include this. Shimkin was only allowed to add his credit to one composition on the album; he originally chose "Deeper and Deeper".
- Clean version of the album does not include "Did You Do It?".
- Mark Goodman and Dave Murphy are credited for "special guest appearances" on "Did You Do It?".
- CD, vinyl, cassette, and Digital Compact Cassette – explicit version, comes with a Parental Advisory label. The vinyl was reissued in 2012 and 2016 by Warner Bros. Records with a different catalog number.
- Limited Australian tour edition – explicit version. Australian digipak edition released in November 1993 to commemorate Madonna's first visit to the country as part of the Girlie Show tour.

== Personnel ==
Credits adapted from the album's liner notes.

=== Musicians and technical ===
- Madonna – vocals, production, composition
- André Betts – synthesizer, bass, piano, strings, drums, keyboard, synthesizer strings, production
- John Davenport – composition
- Emile Charlap – contractor
- Eddie Cooley – composition
- Donna De Lory – background vocals
- Jerome Dickens – guitar
- Glen Dicterow – conductor, concertmaster
- Mike Farrell – engineering
- Anton Fig – drums
- Mark Goodman – guest vocals, assistant engineering
- Robin Hancock – engineering, audio mixing
- Niki Haris – background vocals
- Ted Jensen – mastering
- George Karras – engineering
- Jeremy Lubbock – string arrangements
- P. Dennis Mitchell – engineering
- Joe Moskowitz – programming
- Dave Murphy – guest vocals
- Paul Pesco – guitar
- Shep Pettibone – keyboard, production, engineering, sequencing
- James Preston – piano, keyboard, synthesizer strings
- Sander Selover – programming
- Tony Shimkin – programming
- Danny Wilensky – saxophone
- Doug Wimbish – bass guitar

=== Design ===
- Baron & Baron Inc. – design, art direction
- Steven Meisel – photography
- Siung Fat Tjia – art direction, design

=== Recording ===
- Recorded at Master Mix Studios, Clinton Recording Studios, and Soundworks (New York City).
- Mastering at Sterling Sound (New York City).

== Charts ==
=== Weekly charts ===
Weekly chart performance for Erotica
Chart (1992)	Peak position
Argentine Albums (CAPIF)	1
Australian Albums (ARIA)	1
Austrian Albums (Ö3 Austria)	10
Belgian Albums (IFPI — SIBESA)	9
Brazilian Albums (Nopem/ABPD)	1
Canada Top Albums/CDs (RPM)	4
Canadian Albums (The Record)	3
Danish Albums (IFPI)	2
Dutch Albums (Album Top 100)	13
European Top 100 Albums (Music & Media)	1
Finnish Albums (Suomen virallinen lista)	1
French Albums (SNEP)	1
German Albums (Offizielle Top 100)	5
Greek Albums (IFPI Greece)	3
Hungarian Albums (MAHASZ)	15
Icelandic Albums (Tónlist)	10
Irish Albums (IFPI)	5
Italian Albums (Musica e dischi)	2
Japanese Albums (Oricon)	5
New Zealand Albums (RMNZ)	5
Norwegian Albums (VG-lista)	11
Portuguese Albums (AFP)	6
Spanish Albums (PROMUSICAE)	5
South African Albums (RISA)	28
Swedish Albums (Sverigetopplistan)	6
Swiss Albums (Schweizer Hitparade)	5
UK Albums (Official Charts)	2
US Billboard 200	2

2006–2026 weekly chart performance for Erotica
Chart (2006–2026)	Peak position
Croatian International Albums (HDU)	5
Danish Albums (Hitlisten)	69
Greek Combined Albums (IFPI Greece)	8
Japanese Top Albums Sales (Billboard Japan)	95
Scottish Albums (Official Charts)	55
UK Album Downloads (OCC)	90

=== Year-end charts ===
Year-end chart performance for Erotica
Chart (1992)	Position
Argentina Foreign Albums (CAPIF)	16
Australian Albums (ARIA)	30
Canada Top Albums/CDs (RPM)	32
European Top 100 Albums (Music & Media)	50
Finnish Albums (Suomen virallinen lista)	40
Japanese Albums (Oricon)	88
Spanish Albums (PROMUSICAE)	67
UK Albums (OCC)	27
Chart (1993)	Position
Australian Albums (ARIA)	49
Canada Top Albums/CDs (RPM)	71
US Billboard 200	61
US Top 100 Albums (Cash Box)	44

== Certifications and sales ==
Certifications and sales for Erotica
Region	Certification	Certified units/sales
Argentina (CAPIF)	4× Platinum	240,000^{^}
Australia (ARIA)	3× Platinum	210,000^{^}
Austria (IFPI Austria)	Gold	25,000^{*}
Brazil (Pro-Música Brasil)	Gold	180,000
Canada (Music Canada)	2× Platinum	200,000^{^}
France	—	250,000
Germany (BVMI)	Gold	250,000^{^}
Israel	—	10,000
Italy	—	250,000 (Note: Figures based in presales.)
Japan (RIAJ)	2× Platinum	400,000^{^}
Malaysia	—	25,000
Mexico	—	250,000
Netherlands (NVPI)	Gold	50,000^{^}
Singapore	—	40,000
South Africa (RISA)	Gold	25,000^{*}
Spain (Promusicae)	Platinum	150,000
Switzerland (IFPI Switzerland)	Gold	25,000^{^}
United Kingdom (BPI)	2× Platinum	600,000^{^}
United States (RIAA)	2× Platinum	1,989,000
Summaries
Europe	—	1,500,000
Worldwide	—	6,000,000
^{*} Sales figures based on certification alone.^{^} Shipments figures based on certification alone.

== See also ==
- List of European number-one hits of 1992
- List of number-one albums in Australia during the 1990s

== Bibliography ==
- Anderson, Jamie; Reckhenrich, Jörg; Kupp, Martin (2011). The Fine Art of Success: How Learning Great Art Can Create Great Business. John Wiley & Sons. ISBN 978-1-119-99253-0.
- Bego, Mark (2000). Madonna: Blonde Ambition. Cooper Square Press. ISBN 978-0-8154-1051-5.
- Borzillo-Vrenna, Carrie (2008). Cherry Bomb: The Ultimate Guide to Becoming a Better Flirt, a Tougher Chick, and a Hotter Girlfriend--and to Living Life Like a Rock Star. Simon & Schuster. ISBN 978-1-4169-6116-1.
- Bret, David (2015). Joey Stefano: The Life, Loves & Legacy of the Prince of Passion. Lulu. ISBN 978-1-326-19515-1.
- Easlea, Daryl (2012). Madonna: Blond Ambition. Backbeat Books. ISBN 978-1-61713-034-2.
- Guilbert, Georges-Claude (2002). Madonna as Postmodern Myth. McFarland. ISBN 0-7864-1408-1.
- Lenig, Stuart (2010). The Twisted Tale of Glam Rock. Praeger. ISBN 978-0-313-37986-4.
- McNair, Brian (2002). Striptease Culture: Sex, Media and the Democratization of Desire. Psychology Press. ISBN 0-415-23733-5.
- Metz, Allen; Benson, Carol (1999). The Madonna Companion: Two Decades of Commentary. Music Sales Group. ISBN 978-0-8256-7194-4.
- O'Brien, Lucy (2008). Madonna: Like an Icon. Bantam Press. ISBN 978-0-593-05547-2.
- Pennanen, Timo (2006). Sisältää hitin (in Finnish). Keuruu: Otava. ISBN 951-1-21053-X.
- Richmond, Peter (2007). Fever: The Life and Music of Miss Peggy Lee. Henry Holt and Company. ISBN 978-1-4668-1880-4.
- Rettenmund, Matthew (1995). Encyclopedia Madonnica. St. Martin's Press. ISBN 0-312-11782-5.
- Rooksby, Rikky (2004). The Complete Guide to the Music of Madonna. Omnibus Press. ISBN 0-7119-9883-3.
- Salaverri, Fernando (2005). Sólo éxitos: año a año, 1959–2002 (in Spanish). Spain: Fundación Autor-SGAE. ISBN 8480486392.
- Taraborrelli, Randy J. (2002). Madonna: An Intimate Biography. Simon & Schuster. ISBN 0-7432-2880-4.
- Taraborrelli, Randy J. (2018). Madonna: An Intimate Biography of an Icon at Sixty. Macmillan Publishers. ISBN 978-1-5098-4279-7.
- Tropiano, Stephen (2013). Saturday Night Live FAQ: Everything Left to Know About Television's Longest Running Comedy. Rowman & Littlefield. ISBN 978-1-55783-951-0.
