= List of power stations in Iceland =

Location of power stations in Iceland, geothermal, hydro

The following page lists all power stations in Iceland. Nearly all of Iceland's electricity (>99%) is generated from renewables (mainly hydroelectric dams and geothermal). The islands of Grimsey and Flatey rely on diesel as they are not connected to the grid.

== Hydroelectricity ==
Over 80% of electricity in Iceland is generated in hydroelectric power stations. The hydroelectric power stations, historically all run by Landsvirkjun, are central to the existence of Iceland as an industrialized country.

The largest power station by far is Kárahnjúkar Hydropower Plant (690 MW), which generates electricity in the area north of Vatnajökull for the production of aluminum.

Station	Municipality	Coordinates	Capacity 2011 (MW)	Prior capacity	Output 2007 (MWh)	Commissioned	Refs
Kárahnjúkar	Fljótsdalshérað	64°56′48″N 15°47′25″W	690		699,411	2007	
Búrfell	Skeiða- og Gnúpverjahreppur	64°06′19″N 19°50′00″W	270		1,700,481	1969	
Búðarháls	Ásahreppur	64°14′07″N 19°22′08″W	95			2013	
Hrauneyjafosstöð	Ásahreppur	64°12′03″N 19°14′26″W	210		1,277,186	1981	
Blanda	Húnavatnshreppur	65°24′58″N 19°49′11″W	150		912,275	1991	
Sigalda	Ásahreppur	64°10′23″N 19°07′37″W	150		912,275	1977	
Sultartangastöð	Skeiða- og Gnúpverjahreppur	64°10′02″N 19°37′15″W	120		729,820	2000	
Vatnsfell	Ásahreppur	64°11′46″N 19°01′57″W	90		547,365	2001	
Írafossstöð	Grímsnes- og Grafningshreppur	64°05′15″N 21°00′27″W	47.7	1953: 31MW, 1963: 47.7MW	290,104	1953	
Lagarfoss	Múlaþing	65°30′25″N 14°21′56″W	27.5	1975: 7.5MW, 2007: 27.5MW	45,614	1975	
Steingrímsstöð	Grímsnes- og Grafningshreppur	64°07′46″N 21°01′31″W	27.0		158,128	1959	
Ljósafossstöð	Grímsnes- og Grafningshreppur	64°05′40″N 21°00′39″W	14.6	1937: 8.8MW, 1944: 14.3MW	90,619	1937	
Laxárstöðvar	Þingeyjarsveit	65°49′06″N 17°18′52″W	27.5	1939: 2.5MW, 1944: 5MW, 1953: 14MW, 1973: 23MW, 1993: 27.5MW	85,146	1939	
Mjólkárvirkjun	Ísafjarðarbær	65°46′30″N 23°10′02″W	10.55	1958: 2.4MW, 1975: 8.1MW, 2010: 9.25MW	54,007	1958	
Andakílsárvirkjun	Borgarbyggð	64°32′19″N 21°41′42″W	8.46	1947: 3.68MW, 1974: 8.46MW	48,168	1947	

== Geothermal ==
Iceland uses geothermal energy for heating as well as electricity generation.

Station	Municipality	Coordinates	Capacity 2011 (MW)	Prior capacity	Output 2007 (MWh)	Commissioned	Refs
Hellisheiði	Ölfus	64°02′14″N 21°24′03″W	303 (400 thermal)	2006: 90MW, 2007: 123MW, 2008: 213MW	700,800	2006	
Reykjanes	Reykjanesbær	63°49′35″N 22°40′55″W	130	2006: 100MW, 2023: 130MW	902,280	2006	
Nesjavellir	Grímsnes- og Grafningshreppur	64°06′29″N 21°15′23″W	120 (300 thermal)		1,051,200	1990	
Svartsengi	Grindavík	63°52′44″N 22°25′58″W	76.5 (150 thermal)		406,464	1976	
Krafla	Skútustaðahreppur	65°42′14″N 16°46′23″W	60		525,600	1977	
Bjarnarflag	Skútustaðahreppur	65°38′27″N 16°51′23″W	3		26,280	1969	
Þeistareykir	Þingeyjarsveit	65°53′26″N 16°57′47″W	90		0	2017	
Husavik Power station	Norðurþing		2			2000	

== See also ==
- List of power stations in Europe
- List of largest power stations in the world
