= Iceland Deep Drilling Project =

Icelandic geothermal project

The Iceland Deep Drilling Project (IDDP) is a geothermal project established in 2000 by a consortium of the National Energy Authority of Iceland (Orkustofnun/OS) and four of Iceland's leading energy companies: Hitaveita Suðurnesja (HS), Landsvirkjun, Orkuveita Reykjavíkur and Mannvit Engineering. The consortium is referred to as "Deep Vision".

The aim is to improve the economics of geothermal energy production. Its strategy is to look at the usefulness of supercritical hydrothermal fluids as an economic energy source. This necessitates drilling to depths of greater than 4,000 metres (13,000 ft) in order to tap the temperatures of more than 400 °C (750 °F). The drilling is at a rifted plate margin on the mid-oceanic ridge. Producing steam from a well in a reservoir hotter than 450 °C (840 °F)—at a proposed rate of around 0.67 cubic metres per second (24 cu ft/s) should be sufficient to generate around 45 MW. If this is correct, then the project could be a major step towards developing high-temperature geothermal resources.

"Deep Vision" recognized at its inception that much research would be needed regarding the poorly understood supercritical environment and as such sought to promote inclusion of the wider scientific community.

Funding has come from the members of the consortium, the International Continental Scientific Drilling Program and the US National Science Foundation.

This project has also been used for purposes such as university research. Researchers from UC Davis, UC Riverside, Stanford University, and the University of Oregon have taken the opportunity to collaborate with each other and the IDDP. They have aimed their investigation to gain information about extracting energy from hot rocks on land. To do this, they have been gathering important information from the borehole they sunk where seawater circulates through deep, hot rock. This should give important new clues about black smokers, hydrothermal vents that spew minerals and superheated water deep below the ocean. These support unique microorganism communities living within them.

== First Well, IDDP-1 ==
The 49th Volume of the journal Geothermics, released in January 2014, is entirely dedicated to the first well of the IDDP.

The borehole of this well was unintentionally drilled into a magma reservoir in 2009. The hole was initially planned to drill down to hot rock below 4,000 metres (13,000 ft), but drilling was ceased when the drill struck magma at only 2,100 metres (6,900 ft) deep. This same occurrence has only been recorded once, in a Hawaiian geothermal well in 2007, but in that instance, it resulted in the sealing and abandonment of the hole.

In IDDP-1 the decision was made to continue the experimental well, and upon inserting cold water into the well, which was over 900 °C (1,650 °F). The resultant well was the first operational Magma-EGS, and was at the time the most powerful geothermal well ever drilled. While not producing electricity on the grid, it was calculated that the output of the well would have been sufficient to produce 36 MW of electricity. The well was eventually shut down after a valve failure occurred while attempting to connect the output to a central generator.

== Second Well (continuation of an old borehole), IDDP-2 ==
Five years before IDDP-1 was made, a borehole was drilled at Reykjanesvirkjun. It was named RN-15 or REY H015 (Reykjanes-15) and is just one of many geothermal boreholes drilled in the Reykjanes peninsula since 1956. It reached a maximum depth of 2.5 km (1.55 mi).

It was always known that RN-15 could be deepened, after a good result of the drilling. About 10 years later, IDDP decided to continue drilling under the project name IDDP-2. The plan was to reach a maximum depth of 5 km (3.11 mi) before the end of 2016, making it by far the deepest borehole in Iceland. Scientists were hoping to reach a temperature of 500 °C (930 °F), which would be the hottest blast of any hole in the world, breaking the former record of the IDDP-1 Krafla borehole.

Drilling began on 11 August 2016 and was completed 167 days later on 25 January 2017. The final depth was 4,659 metres (15,285 ft), with a temperature of 427 °C (800 °F) and fluid pressure of 340 bars (4,900 psi). Core samples were taken, showing rocks at the bottom that appeared to be permeable, and fluids in supercritical conditions were successfully reached, accomplishing all of the main objectives of the drilling operation.

== See also ==
- Geothermal power in Iceland
- Renewable energy in Iceland

== Bibliography ==
- Fridleifsson, G.O., and Albertsson, A., 2000. Deep geothermal drilling at Reykjanes Ridge: opportunity for an international collaboration. In Proceedings of the World Geothermal Congress 2000, Japan: Reykjavik, Iceland (International Geothermal Association, Inc.), 3701–3706.
- Fell, A.; Zierenberg, R. (7 November 2007). "Deep Drilling for "Black Smoker" Clues". UC Davis News & Information.
