= Geothermal power in Iceland =

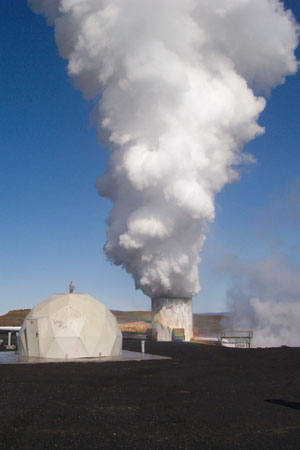
Geothermal borehole outside the Reykjanes Power Station

Geothermal power in Iceland refers to the use of geothermal energy in Iceland for electricity generation.

Iceland's uniquely active geology has led to natural conditions especially suitable for harnessing geothermal energy. Icelanders have long used geothermal energy for direct applications, such as heating homes and baths. The more recent, widespread adoption of geothermal energy as an energy source in Iceland was spawned by a need to stabilize energy prices and increase energy independence, allowing Iceland to increase reliance on geothermal energy for direct applications alongside electricity generation and contributing significantly to diminishing Iceland's carbon footprint.

The growth of geothermal power in Iceland is due to its continued support from the Icelandic government. According to a 2025 country update, Iceland's installed geothermal power production capacity is 785 megawatts (MW), across nine power plants larger than 0.5 MW. Geothermal energy produces over a quarter of Iceland's total electricity.

== Geology ==
Above are the tectonic plate rifts of Iceland. NVZ, the largest of all of them, runs from Akureyri to Reykjavík. There are many volcanoes along this rift, including Krafla, Fremri-Námar, Askja, Tungnafellsjökull, Hekla, Vatnafjöll, Katla, Torfajökull, and Eyjafjallajökull.

Iceland's territory is some of the most geologically active on Earth. The country straddles the Mid-Atlantic Ridge (a rift between continental plates), and lies over a volcanic hotspot. This combination of factors has led to pronounced volcanism and geothermal activity. Furthermore, the island also possesses underground water reservoirs continually replenished by rain. Magma underneath the island heats these reservoirs to hundreds of degrees Fahrenheit. At least 25 such geothermal aquifers lie within the volcanic zone. These natural conditions in Iceland are favorable for geothermal power production.

== History ==
=== Geothermal energy in Iceland ===
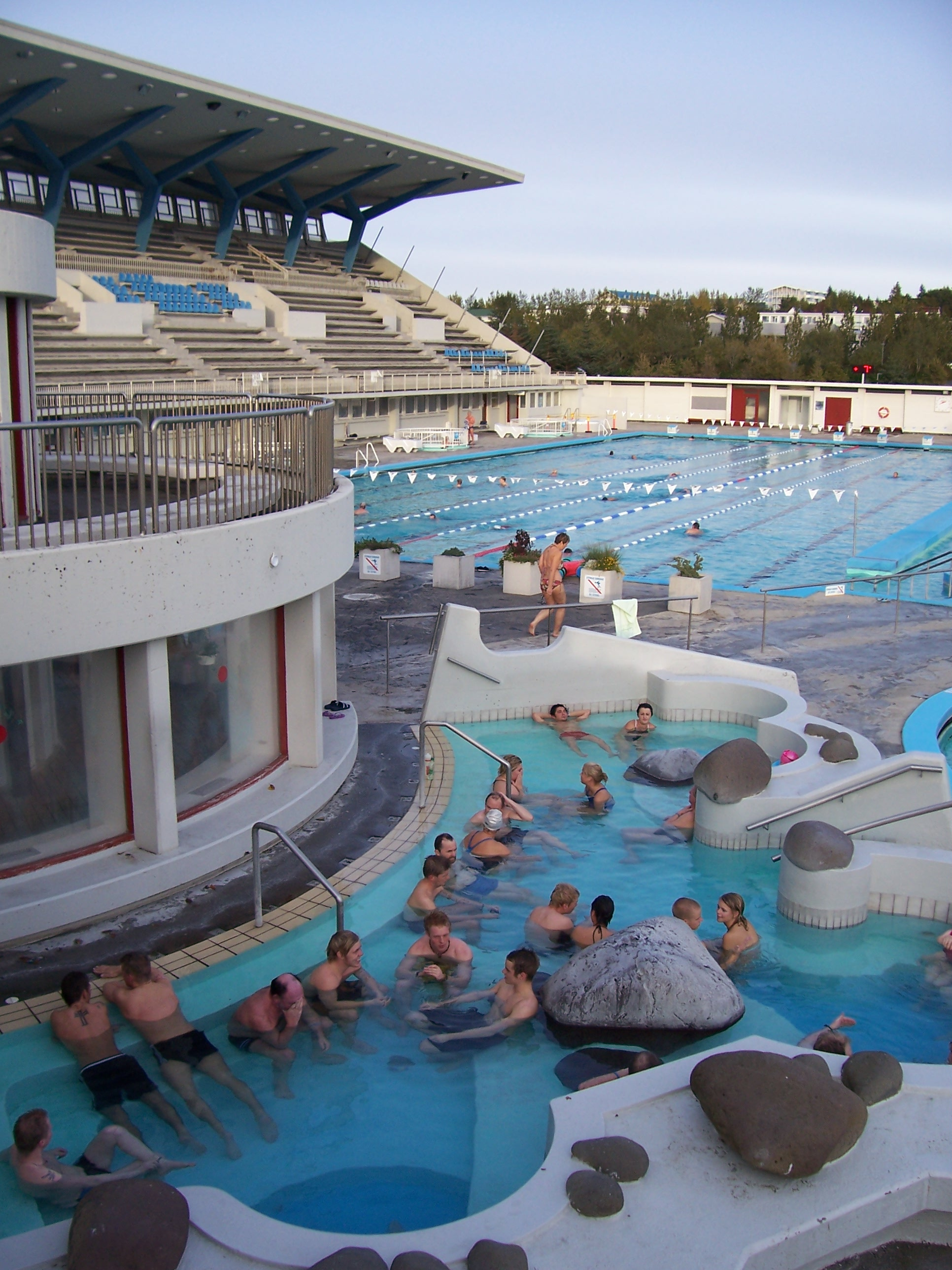
A geothermally heated swimming pool complex in Iceland

Geothermal energy has been employed by Icelanders since the Viking Age, with initial uses including washing and bathing. Later, it began to be used to heat homes, greenhouses, and swimming pools, as well as to keep streets and sidewalks free of snow and ice. Today, at least 90% of all homes in Iceland are heated with geothermal energy.

The Blue Lagoon is a prominent example of a geothermal bath. With a mix of seawater and discharge freshwater from the nearby Svartsengi Power Station, the Blue Lagoon is 5,000 square meters in size and is Iceland's most popular tourist attraction.

While geothermal energy has had many uses in Iceland throughout history, its use there for electricity generation did not come until relatively recently. Iceland's power was largely derived from fossil fuels until the 1970s, when the national government looked to address energy price inequities across the country. A report commissioned in 1970 by the country's National Energy Authority, Orkustofnun, recommended increased domestic production of geothermal power and hydroelectricity to stabilize energy prices and reduce the nation's reliance on external energy resources. In 1973, an international energy crisis began, subjecting Iceland to highly volatile oil prices and an uncertain energy market. The crisis sparked Iceland's government to ramp up adoption of the domestic power sources identified by the National Energy Authority's report. The ensuing rapid growth of renewable energy production mostly originated from a geopolitical desire for energy independence and was catalyzed by the urgent economic constraints during the 1970s energy crisis. Since then, in addition to increasing Iceland's energy independence, it has also resulted in the widespread decarbonization of the country's electric grid.

=== Government policy ===
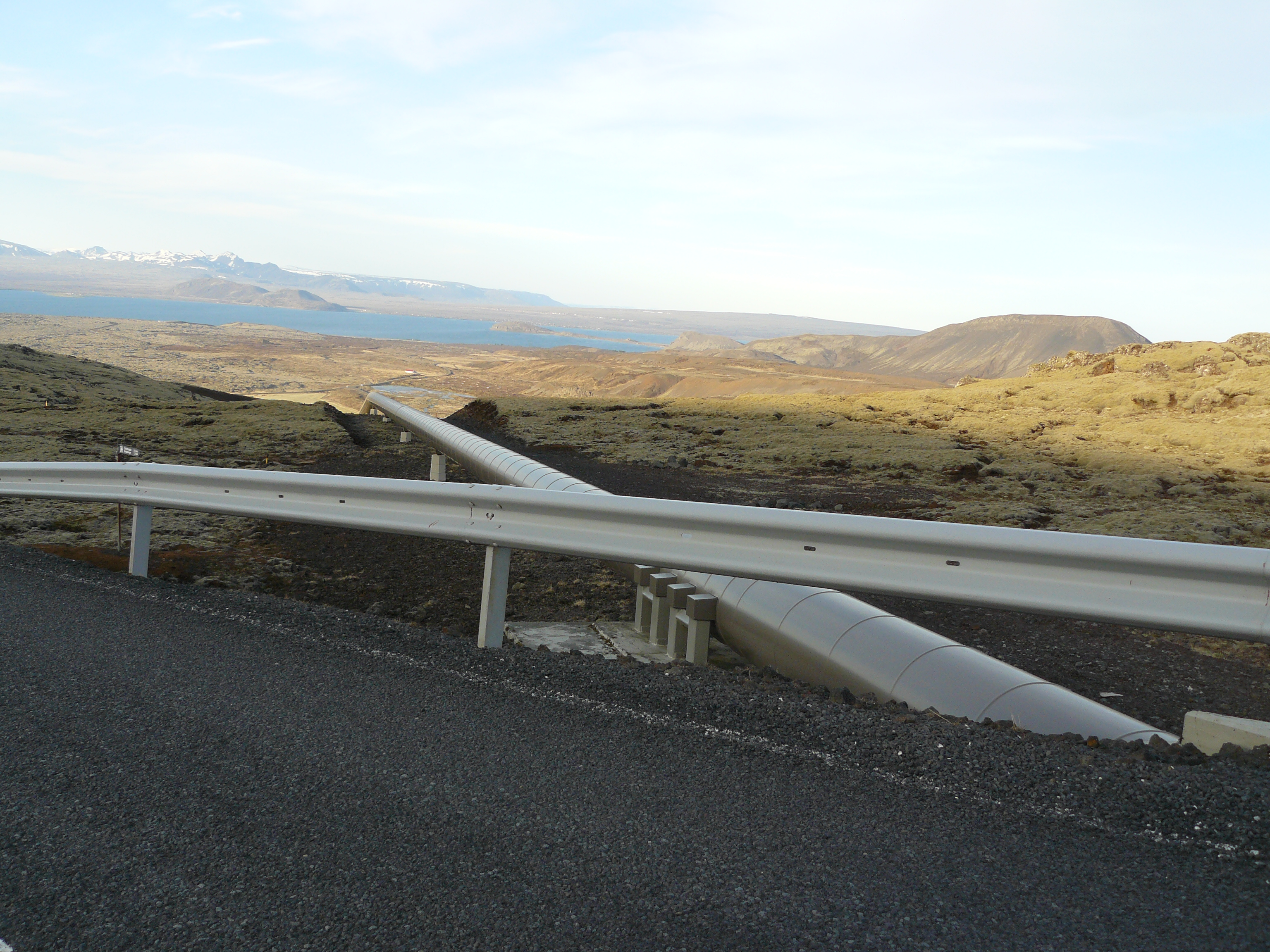
A pipeline from the Nesjavellir Geothermal Power Plant to Reykjavik

Iceland's government policies strongly encourage the usage of renewable energy resources in power production. These policies stem from energy issues that the country had faced in years past; in the 1970s, for example, Iceland's government responded to increasing oil prices by replacing oil with geothermal energy in district heating. As a result, the cost of heating was decreased significantly, and compared to most other countries, was much lower.

As progress continued on geothermal energy projects and investments, the National Energy Authority laid out their master plan to implement the use of geothermal energy in two phases. The first phase was conducted during 1999–2003, which primarily focused on data gathering. The second phase was conducted during 2004–2009, where the first half of those years was spent on further research and the second half spent on evaluating geothermal fields. A total of 24 potential geothermal projects were considered under the master plan. Today, many of these projects are still under consideration by the Icelandic Parliament.

The government still faces issues with providing all households with accessibility to geothermal power, as there remain villages and rural areas that lack geothermal heating infrastructure. To combat this issue, Iceland's government is continuously engaging in exploration activities for the villages and rural areas to explore possible locations for geothermal energy infrastructure. In 2019, the construction of a 20-km hot water transmission pipeline from a geothermal field to the town of Höfn was constructed to replace electricity as their source of heating for 1,800 people.

Iceland's government has also put effort into foreign policies and investments that encourage other nations to harness renewable energy such as geothermal power. One of Iceland's foreign efforts is the African Rift Geothermal Development Facility Project, which began in 2010, and is performed in partnership with the United Nations Environment Programme (UNEP) in countries such as Ethiopia, Kenya and Rwanda. Iceland has also helped train geothermal engineers from around the world through the United Nations University Geothermal Training Programme.

== Consumption ==
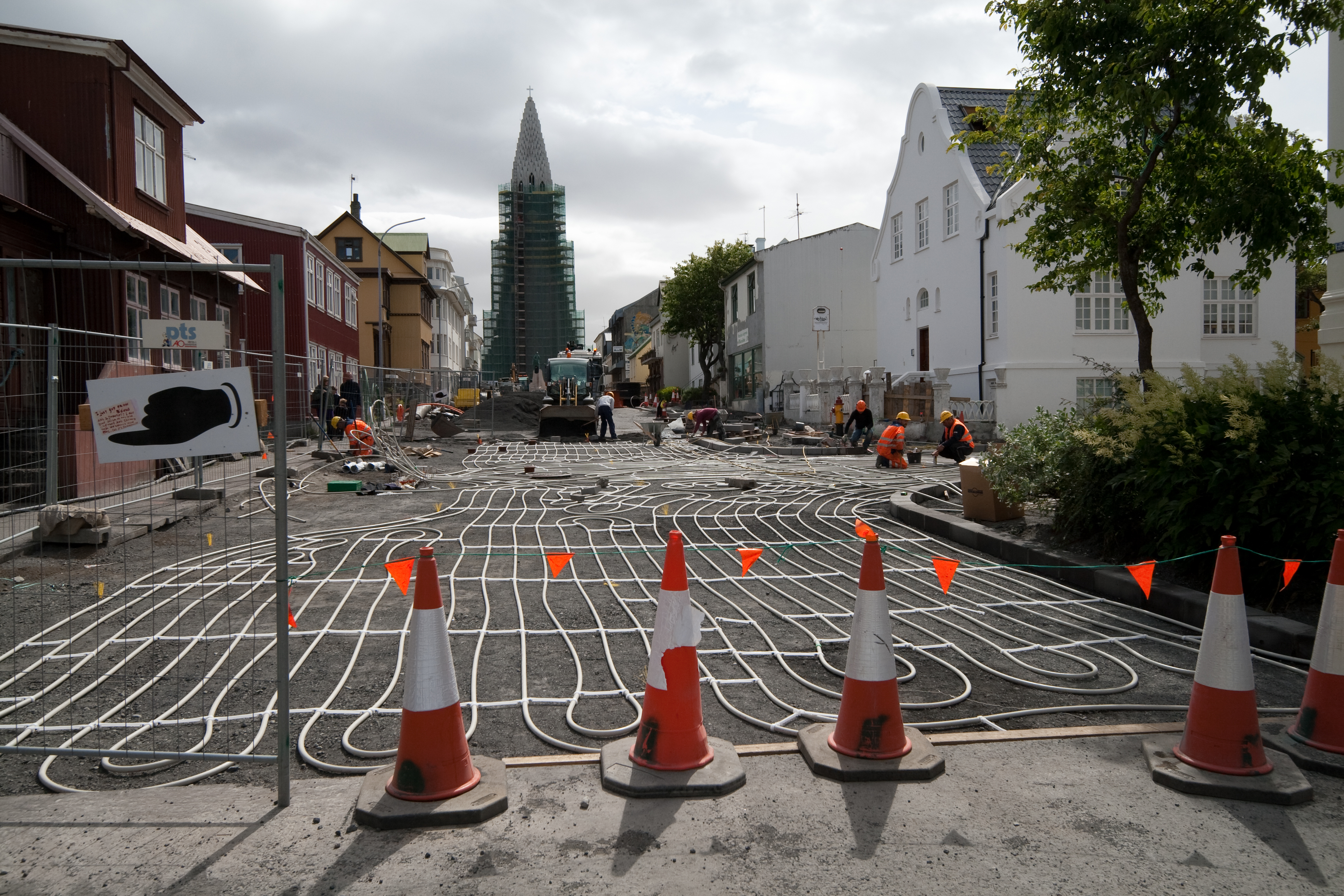
An example of geothermal snow-melting infrastructure under a street in Reykjavik

According to a 2025 country update, geothermal energy accounted for about 65% of Iceland's primary energy supply (referenced to 15 °C). Together with hydropower, indigenous renewable sources provide roughly 85% of Iceland's primary energy, while the remainder comes mainly from imported fossil fuels used for transport and the fishing fleet. This means 173.2 petajoules (48.1 TWh) of the total 246.1 petajoules (68.4 TWh) of primary energy used by Iceland in 2020 is from a geothermal source. The geothermal energy is then used in two main ways: direct application and indirectly via electricity generation.

=== Direct applications ===
Most geothermal energy in Iceland is used for heating activities. As of 2020, the primary use of geothermal heat is space heating 23,094 terajoules (6,415 GWh), followed by heated swimming pools 3,628 terajoules (1,008 GWh), snow melting 2,036 terajoules (566 GWh), fish farming 1,404 terajoules (390 GWh), greenhouses 429 terajoules (119 GWh), and industry usage 393 terajoules (109 GWh). As these uses are reliant solely on geothermal heat, they do not result in the energy losses that come with generating electricity. Instead, many of these direct applications use water as the means of transmission. In Iceland's capital Reykjavík, hot water from 100° to 300 °C is used to heat homes, then piped into plastic tubing underneath streets and sidewalks at 30 °C (86 °F) to melt snow and ice.

Iceland electricity production by source

=== Electricity generation ===
Iceland has recently been self-sufficient in producing electricity, consistently meeting or exceeding electricity demand in the country mainly through geothermal and hydropower generation. In 2020, 99.94% of electricity in Iceland was produced by hydro and geothermal means, with 13,157 and 5,961 gigawatt hours (GWh) produced respectively. Geothermal energy accounts for over a quarter of Iceland's electric power production.

However, after the droughts in the summer season of 2021, low reservoir levels for hydropower generation along with increasing electricity demand in the nation led to an electricity supply crunch. To suppress electricity demand, the Icelandic government had to cut back electricity from certain industries. This supply crunch caused by fluctuations in hydropower generation has Iceland considering the expansion of power generation infrastructure.

== Electricity production infrastructure ==
According to the National Energy Authority of Iceland, in 2020, Iceland's geothermal facilities had in total an installed capacity of 799 MW_{e}, making up 25.9% of all power capacity in Iceland, besides hydropower, wind, and fossil fuels.

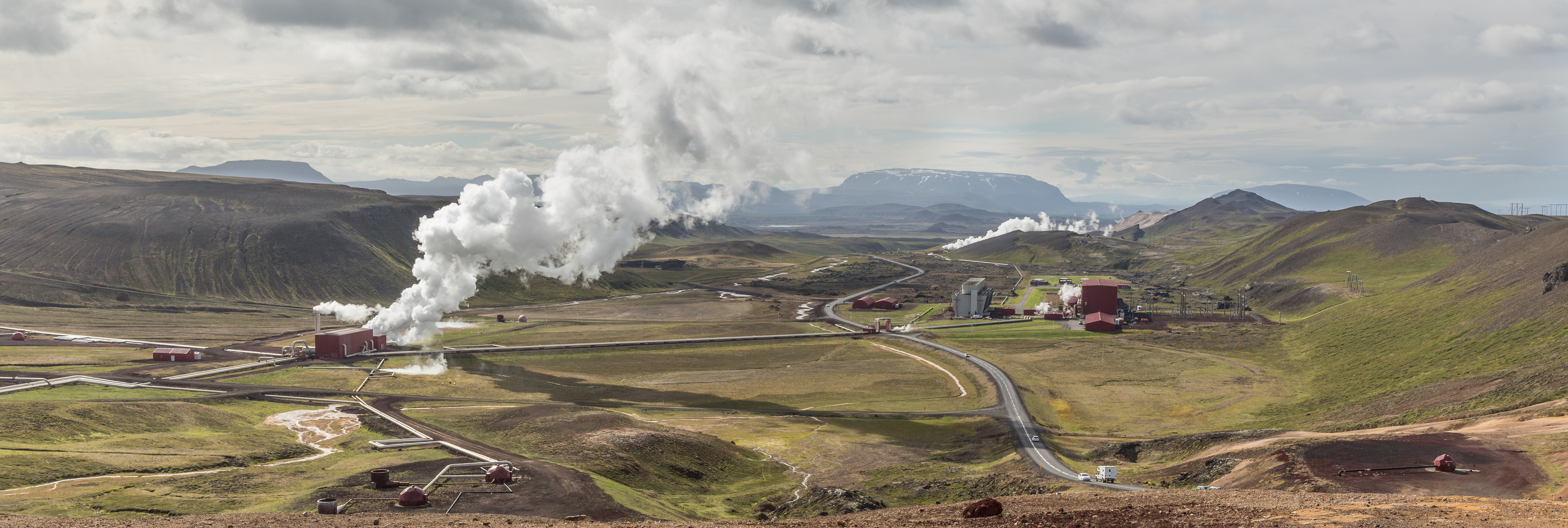
Krafla geothermal power plant

According to Askja Energy Partners, an energy consulting firm in Iceland, the three entities that own and operate the largest geothermal power stations in Iceland are HS Orka, ON Power, and Landsvirkjun (National Power Company of Iceland).

The following are nine power plants that contribute the most to Iceland's geothermal power production capacity; the ownership of each geothermal power plant is also noted:

Icelandic geothermal power plants as of 2020
Name	Capacity (MW_{e})	Ownership
Hellisheiði	303.4	ON Power
Nesjavellir	120	ON Power
Reykjanes	100	HS Orka
Þeistareykir	90	Landsvirkjun
Svartsengi	76.4	HS Orka
Krafla	60	Landsvirkjun
Bjarnarflag	5	Landsvirkjun
Húsavík	2	Wasabi Energy
Flúðir	0.6	Varmaorka

In Reykjavík, hydrogen sulfide (H_{2}S) emitted from two nearby geothermal power plants, Hellisheiði and Nesjavellir, may have impacted residents' health. Research conducted by the University of Iceland in 2012 found that weather events favorable for H_{2}S concentrations in Reykjavík greater than the national 24-hour health limit of 50 μg m^{−3} can be expected to occur twice a year on average.

Iceland is also investing in geothermal energy research projects like the Iceland Deep Drilling Project (IDDP). If successful, the technology being developed by IDDP could produce ten times more power than current geothermal power technology. By drilling more than 15,000 feet (4.5 km) deep into the volcanic fields in Iceland's Reykjanes Peninsula, researchers are hoping to investigate the use of supercritical fluids for harnessing geothermal energy. If achieved, projects like IDDP will allow a greater portion of Iceland's electricity to be generated by geothermal means.

== See also ==
- Energy in Iceland
- List of power stations in Iceland
- The Geothermal Energy Exhibition
- Iceland Deep Drilling Project
- Renewable energy by country
