= Icelandic New Energy =

Company

Icelandic New Energy Íslensk NýOrka
- Company type: private
- Industry: energy
- Founded: 1999
- Headquarters: Reykjavík, Iceland
- Key people: Jón Björn Skúlason (General Manage); Anna Margret Korneliusdottir (Senior Project Manager)
- Services: RD&D projects in low and zero-emission alternative fuels for transport
- Owner: Vistorka, Daimler, Norsk Hydro, Shell Hydrogen
- Website: www.newenergy.is

Icelandic New Energy Ltd (Íslensk NýOrka ehf) is a company founded in 1999 following a decision in 1998 by the Icelandic Parliament to convert vehicles and fishing fleets to hydrogen produced from renewable energy by 2050.

Icelandic New Energy was formed as a spin-off from the research by the University of Iceland and was initially 51% owned by Vistorka, with the remainder owned by Daimler, Norsk Hydro and Shell Hydrogen. VistOrka was owned by The Icelandic New Business Venture Fund (Nýsköpunarsjóður), the Ministry of Industry and Commerce, the national power company Landsvirkjun, Orkuveita Reykjavíkur (Reykjavík Energy), Hitaveita Suðurnesja, the Technological Institute of Iceland, The Fertilizer Plant (Áburðarverksmiðjan), the University of Iceland and Reykjavik Resources.

As of 2024, shareholders include Landsvirkjun, Reykjavík Energy, HS Orka, and the Government of Iceland.

Together with SEV, and the authorities in the Faroe Islands and Greenland, Icelandic New Energy established the North Atlantic Hydrogen Association (NAHA) to investigate hydrogen technology. NAHA has been largely inactive since 2020.

In its early years, INE promoted the use of hydrogen fuel in Iceland but broadened its scope in 2008 to include other alternative, low- and zero-emission fuels for transport.

Along with partners Hydrogen Denmark Hydrogen Sweden Norwegian Hydrogen Forum and VTT Finland, INE was also a founding member of the Nordic Hydrogen Partnership (formerly the Scandinavian Hydrogen Highway Partnership (SHHP)) through which it collaborates on a regular basis.

Since its foundation, Icelandic New Energy has managed numerous local, Nordic and EU demonstration projects. INE also engages in energy transition consultancy, educational seminars, and other activities.

== See also ==
- Renewable energy in Iceland
- Hydrogen economy
