= Sigalda Power Plant =

Electric power plant in Iceland

Coordinates: 64.1732°N 19.1270°W

Location of Sigalda Power Plant

Sigalda Power Plant (Icelandic: Sigöldustöð [ˈsɪːɣˌœltʏˌstœːθ]; "Sigalda station" [ˈsɪːɣˌalta]) is an electric generating plant located in the southern Highlands of Iceland near Þórisvatn. It is the biggest reservoir in Iceland, located around 160 km east from Reykjavík, among Hrauneyjalón and Krókslón reservoirs. It was officially launched early 1978. This power plant is the newest of six other hydroelectric plants (Búrfell, Búðarháls, Vatnsfell, Sultartangi, Hrauneyjafoss). Its construction was quick. It created demand for more hydropower plants to meet electricity needs in the country. The plant is owned by the national power company of Iceland, Landsvirkjun.

== Design ==
Construction of the Sigalda Hydroelectric Power Station began in 1978, and included three 50-MW turbines. The Sigalda Station is linked into the national grid with 220kV transmission lines to the Sultartangi, Hrauneyjafoss and Vatnsfell Stations, as well as a 132-kV line to southeast Iceland. Together, the installed capacity measures 150MW and is able to produce 650gWh p.a. with a flow rate of 230 m³/s.

Sigalda Dam dams the Tungnaá River at the top of the canyon above Sigalda Hill, where it forms Krókslón, a 14 km² reservoir. The rock-fill dam is 925 m long, clad with asphalt, and 40m tall at its highest point. The water is carried 1 km through an intake canal from Krókslón Reservoir to the western edge of Sigalda Hill. Three pressure shafts, 216 m long and 4.3 m in diameter runto the powerhouse north of the riverbed. The harnessed head is 74m. A 550m tailrace canal leads from the powerhouse into the Hrauneyjafoss Reservoir.
