= Iceland GeoSurvey =

Agency overview
- Formed: July 1, 2003
- Preceding agency: Orkustofnun
- Headquarters: Reykjavík, Iceland
- Employees: 90 (2008)
- Agency executives: Olafur G. Flovenz, Director; Benedikt Steingrimsson, Chief Project Manager
- Parent agency: Iceland Department of Energy
- Website: www.geothermal.is

Iceland GeoSurvey (ÍSOR) is a consulting and research institute providing specialist services to the Icelandic power industry, the Icelandic government and foreign companies, in particular in the field of geothermal sciences and utilisation. It also aims to advance geoscientific knowledge of the Iceland landmass and its continental shelf by means of systematic surveying, monitoring and research. The headquarters are in Reykjavík with an affiliate in Akureyri, North Iceland.

Iceland GeoSurvey is a self-financed, non-profit governmental institution which operates on project and contract basis. It was established in 2003 and took over all responsibilities of the former GeoScience Division of the National Energy Authority of Iceland (Orkustofnun). Research on Iceland’s indigenous energy resources goes back to the 18th century. Systematic energy research by Icelandic government institutes started in 1944 and has been carried out continuously ever since. Iceland GeoSurvey and its predecessor have from the start played a key role in this work. This research and the activities of the Icelandic power industry have resulted in that over 50% of the primary energy use in Iceland at present has its source in geothermal energy.

== Services ==
Iceland GeoSurvey provides a wide variety of energy research, exploration and development services on contract in Iceland and abroad. The main services provided are:

Geothermal and hydropower resources:

- Exploration and research on geothermal resources.
- Consulting services related to exploration, earth sciences, drilling and production.
- Services related to geothermal system management, operation and exploitation.
- Geothermal system modelling.
- Technical and economic feasibility studies related to utilisation options.
- Supervision and training of geothermal scientists.
- Geodetic surveying.
- Geological mapping.
- Exploration and evaluation of groundwater resources.

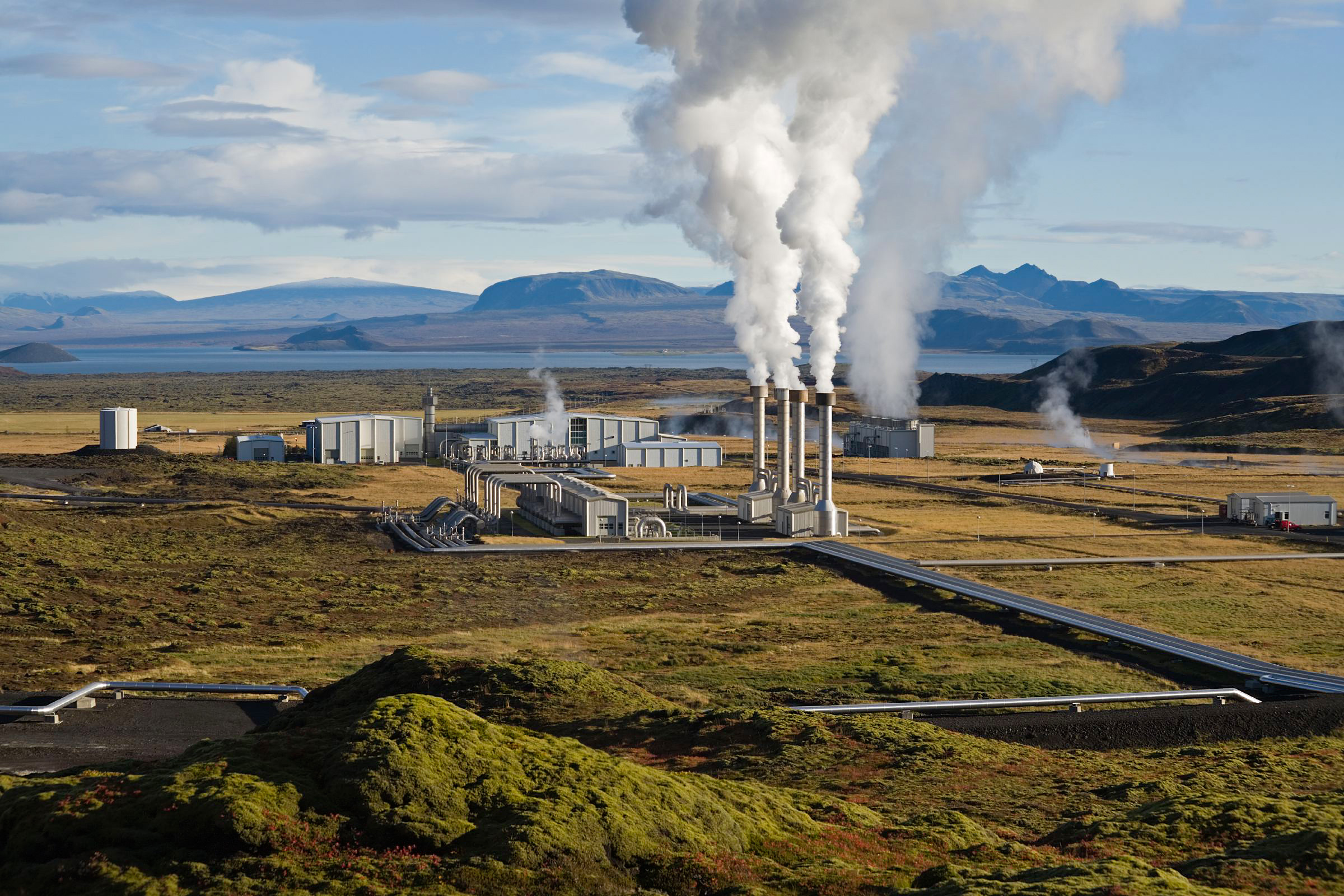
The Nesjavellir Geothermal Power Plant in Iceland

Environment:

- Environmental impact assessment of energy development and chemical pollution.
- Geological and chemical investigations.
- Basic data collection and appraisal of undeveloped energy resources.
- Monitoring of environmental impact of energy production.

Other research:

- Marine geosciences including oil and gas prospecting.
- Processing and interpretation of seismic surveys.
- Freshwater studies.
- Geotechnical studies for tunnels and constructions.

== See also ==
- Renewable energy in Iceland
- Geothermal power in Iceland
