= Bjarnarflag Power Station =

Geothermal station near Námafjall Mountain, Iceland

Coordinates: 65.6409°N 16.8569°W

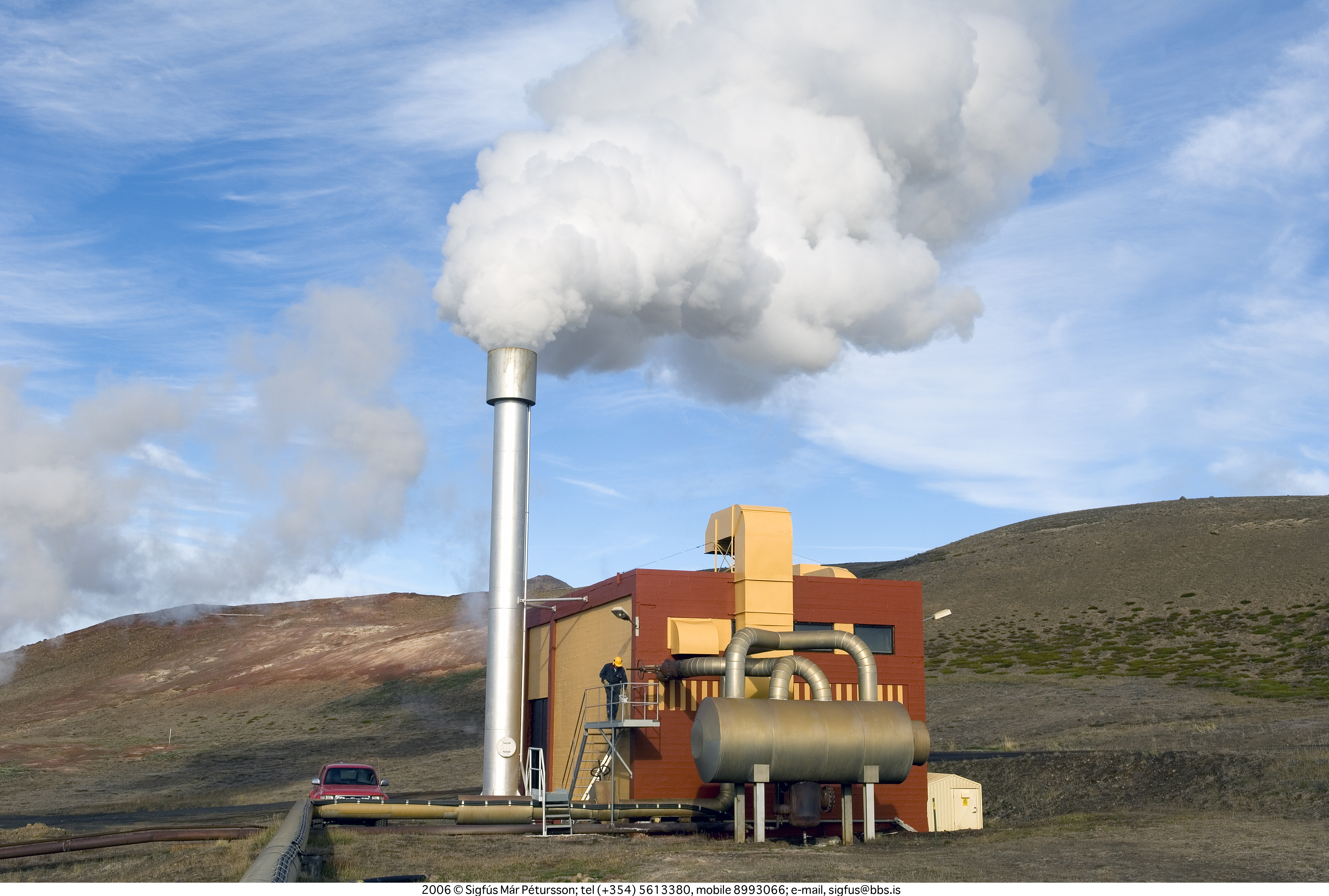

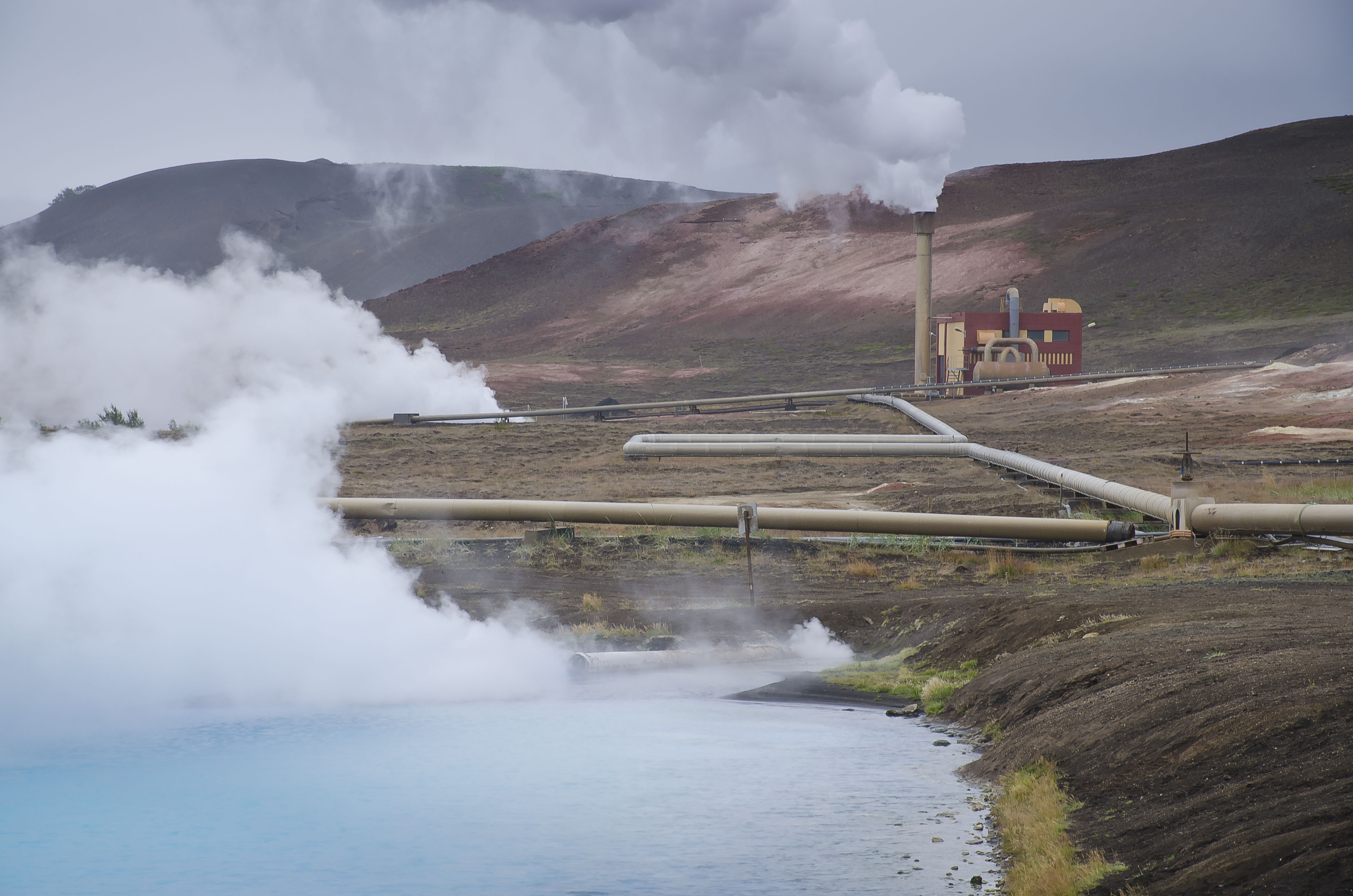

The Bjarnarflag Geothermal Station (Icelandic: Bjarnarflagsvirkjun) is the smallest geothermal station operated by Landsvirkjun, the Icelandic national power company. It is located in the north of Iceland near Námafjall Mountain in the geothermal area of Mývatn. It lies just a few kilometres from the Ring road (Route 1), around 100 km from Akureyri, and approximately 400 km from the capital city of Reykjavík. It was officially launched on 5 March 1969.

With more than 40 years of operations, Bjarnarflag is one of the oldest geothermal stations in Iceland and with this kind of technology it is the first of its kind in the world. Bjarnarflag is operated by Krafla, the largest geothermal power station in North Iceland. The Krafla Power Station is located 10 km from Bjarnarflag and is the second oldest geothermal station in Iceland. The success of Bjarnarflag encouraged other geothermal project managers to undertake the construction of even larger power plants in this geothermal field, such as the Krafla, Svartsengi and Nesjavellir power plants. In 2001, these power stations delivered more than 200 MW, about 20% of the total capacity. Bjarnarflag is able to produce 18 GWh annually with its installed capacity of 3 MW (1 x 3 MW, 1 steam power unit).

== History ==
The idea of harnessing geothermal energy and building a power station in the Bjarnarflag area was first debated in 1967 and after one year the hydroelectric power stations on the River Laxa were permitted to develop this project. Construction work was finished in the summer of 1968, and it started producing energy in 1969.

Increased tectonic activity from 1975 to 1984 forced the disassembly of Bjarnarflag in 1980 because of imminent danger of eruptions in this area. The tectonic movements at this time caused significant damage to the existing boreholes, so a new borehole was sunk once it was deemed safe to resume operations in 1980. After re-installation, Bjarnarflag has delivered 2 1/2–3 MW.

In 2001, power generation was stopped at Bjarnarflag in order for reconstruction and improvements to generators, turbines and other equipment. More than 60 million Icelandic krona was invested in the reconstruction. There are plans to increase capacity by adding extra turbines and enlarging the size of the power station, but these plans have met with some resistance.

In 2011, the design work for a new 2x45 MW geothermal power plant in Bjarnarflag started under the management of Verkis. The new power plant was to be commissioned and connected to the grid in 2015. When the new plant will be completed, the existing 3 MW power plant is slated to be shut down.

The Bjarnarflag power plant is used to supply hot water and heating for the local district, particularly the village of Mývatn, and geothermal brine to the Mývatn nature baths. The Mývatn nature baths are a popular tourist attraction that contributes to improving the economic situation in this region.

== Facts ==
- Installed capacity 3 MW
- 1 steam power unit 1 x 3 MW
- Generation capacity 18 GWh p.a.
- Brought online 1969

== Concerns ==
Concerns have been raised over the visual impact of such a power plant and the requisite power lines entailed. Many think the area around Lake Mývatn already suffers from too much construction. There are also concerns about possible impact from the disposal of outlet water.
