= Búðarháls Power Plant =

Búðarháls Hydropower Plant
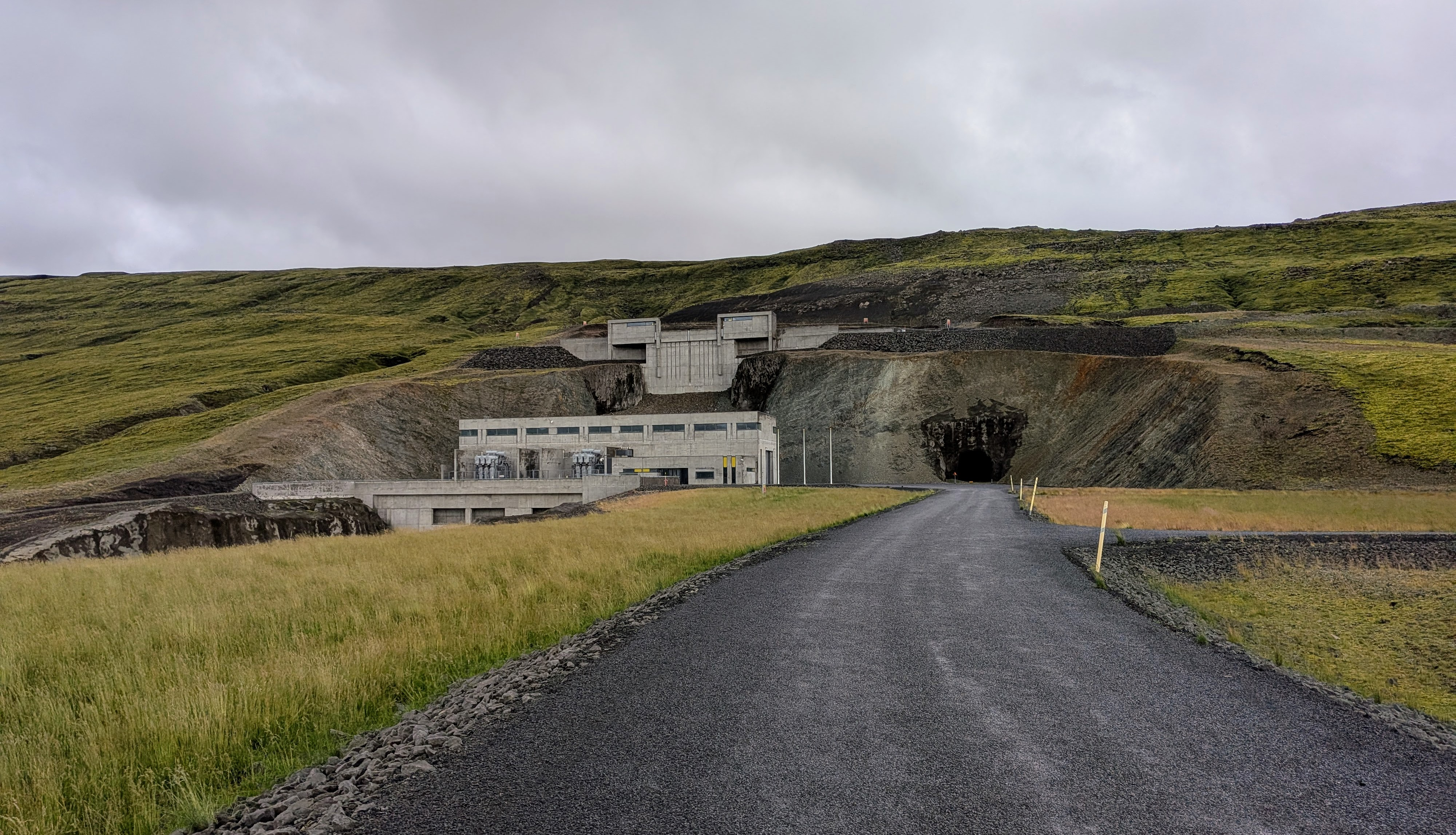
- Interactive map of Búðarháls Hydropower Plant
- Country: Iceland
- Coordinates: 64°14′07″N 19°22′09″W
- Status: Optional
- Opening date: March 7, 2014

Dam and spillways
- Type of dam: Embankment, two rock-fill dams
- Impounds: Tungnaá River; Kaldakvísl River
- Height: 25 m (82 ft)
- Length: 170 m (560 ft) 1,100 m (3,600 ft)
- Dam volume: 25,500 m^{3} (900,000 cu ft) (170m x 25m x 6m) 165,000 m^{3} (5,800,000 cu ft) (1100m x 25m x 6m)
- Spillways: 1
- Spillway type: Headrace tunnel, penstock

Reservoir
- Creates: Sporðalda Reservoir
- Total capacity: 50 hm^{3} (41,000 acre⋅ft)
- Surface area: 7 km^{2} (2.7 sq mi)

Power Station
- Operator: Landsvirkjun
- Turbines: 2 x 47.5 MW (63,700 hp) Kaplan-type
- Installed capacity: 95 MW
- Annual generation: 585 GWh

Búðarháls hydroelectric power plant (Icelandic: Búðarhálsstöð [ˈpuːðarˌhaulsˌstœːθ]) is the seventh largest power station of Landsvirkjun, the Icelandic national power company. It is located in the south of Iceland, around 150 km to the east of Reykjavík, in the Þjórsá and Tungnaá water catchment area, near the junction of the Kaldakvísl and Tungnaá rivers. It was officially opened on 7 March 2014.

This power plant is the newest of six hydroelectric plants (the others being Búrfell, Sultartangi, Hrauneyjafoss, Vatnsfell and Sigalda) in the Þjórsá-Tungnaá area, and it is able to produce 585 GWh annually with its installed capacity of 95 MW (2 x 47.5 MW). The created reservoir, Sporðalda in the southeast of the mountain, with a surface of 7 km^{2} and a total capacity of 50 hm³, is backed up by two embankment dams.

The Búðarháls power station is very important to the development of Iceland´s hydropower plants, since it connects all power plants on this river, which allows Iceland to use the whole river from top to bottom to its fullest, in order to make it unnecessary to destroy and dam other rivers instead.

== Power-plant details ==
The Búðarháls Hydroelectric Power Station consists of the power plant building, two dams and a tunnel. The Búðarháls power house measures a size of around 66.800 m³ (55,400m x 31,05m x 38,84 m/ 26,54m underground), which contains two Kaplan turbines with a capacity of 47,5 MW each. Together the installed generating capacity measures 95 MW and the plant is able to produce 585 GWh p.a. with a flow rate of 280 m³/s and a head of 40m.

The two rock-fill dams were built to the east of the mountain´s ridge and a little upstream of the juncture of the Tungnaá and Kaldakvísl River. The NW-dam runs across the Kaldakvísl River and the SE-dam was constructed over the tail water from the Hrauneyjafoss Power Station. Both dams are around 25m high and have a total length of 1300m (170m and 1100m). The drill and blast headrace tunnel, which is 4 km long, 11.3m wide and 14.7m high, provides the turbines and the power plant with water from the new created intake Sporðalda reservoir. The tunnel transports the water through the mountain to a surge basin on the west side near the Sultartangi Reservoir, afterwards two 60m long steel pressure pipes (steel lined penstocks) channel the water into the station´s turbines.

The power produced from the turbines is directed from the generator to the transformer, which is located in the front of the station; after that it is sent underground to the Landsnet substation and further to the Hrauneyjar line onto the National grid.

== Project development ==
Construction work on the Búðarháls Hydroelectric Plant began at the end of 2001. After preparing the construction site in order to make it more easily accessible, the actual and official construction work began in November 2010, in which 65,000 m³ of concrete and 4500 tonnes of steel was used. Digging operations were finished in September 2012 and by the end of 2013 the powerhouse and intake structure were completed and the Sporðalda reservoir filled. After the reservoir and the dam were filled, the power station became operational and after some testing the hydroelectric power plant was officially brought online on 7 March 2014.
