= HS Orka =

Icelandic energy company

- Combined logo of HS Veitur and HS Orka
- Type: Limited company
- Industry: Energy
- Predecessor: Hitaveita Suðurnesja
- Founded: 1 January 1974
- Founder: Local municipalities The state of Iceland
- Headquarters: Svartsengi Power Station, Grindavík, Iceland
- Number of locations: 3
- Area served: Reykjanes Peninsula
- Products: Wholesale electricity Wholesale hot water
- Number of employees: 63
- Website: www.hsorka.is

HS Orka is a privately owned Icelandic energy company that produces electricity and hot water mainly from geothermal sources, mainly on the Reykjanes Peninsula. It is the third largest electricity producer in Iceland, after Landsvirkjun and Orka náttúrunnar. HS Orka operates two geothermal power plants: Svartsengi and Reykjanes, as well as a small hydropower station, Brú. As of 2022, its total installed electrical capacity is 215 MW, and 190 MWth geothermal hot water power.

== History ==
HS Orka traces its routs back to 1974, when the construction of the Svartsengi Power Station began. It was the world's first combined heat and power geothermal power station. It was established as Hitaveita Suðurnesja, and majority owned by local municipalities. In 1976, Svartsengi Power Station began providing geothermal hot water through a district heating network in Grindavík. In 1978, electricity production began at Svartsengi Power station. Geothermal district heating distribution was later expanded to the rest of towns on the Reykjanes Peninsula.

As a result of new laws, in 2008 Hitaveita Suðurnesja split off its distribution arm into HS Veitur. Hitaveita Suðurnesja was then renamed HS Orka and oversees energy production (operation of power plants and wholesale of energy). In 2009, Alterra Power began buying shares in HS Orka and by 2011 had majority ownership. In 2019, Alterra sold off its shares in HS Orka and is now majority owned by Macquarie Infrastructure and Real Assets (MIRA). The distributor, HS Veitur, is still majority owned by the local municipality, Reykjanesbær.

In 2023, one of the power plants operated by HS Orka had to be shielded from being exposed to lava.
