= Husavik Power station =

Geothermal power station in Húsavík, Iceland

Husavik Power Station
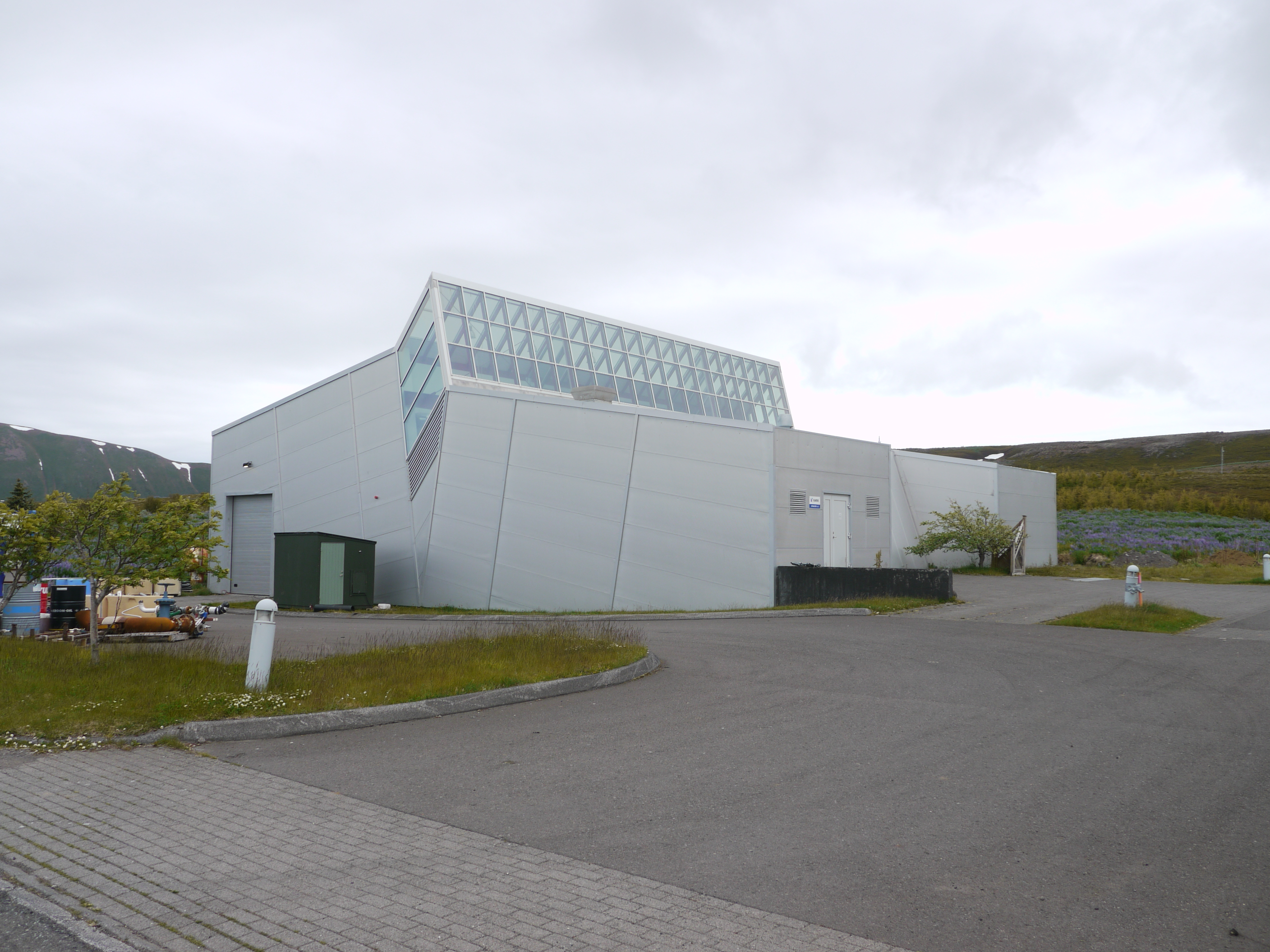
- Country: Iceland
- Location: Húsavík
- Coordinates: 66.02181°N 17.35165°W
- Status: Operational
- Construction began: 1999
- Commission date: 2000

Geothermal power station
- Type: Binary cycle
- Min. source temp.: 120 °C (248 °F)

Power generation
- Nameplate capacity: 2 MW

Husavik Power Station is a geothermal power station in Húsavík, Iceland. It has a rated capacity of 2 MW. The plant was built by Mannvit Engineering in cooperation with Exorka International. It uses the Kalina power cycle technology and was commissioned in 2000. The 120 °C (248 °F) geothermal brine flows from wells located 20 kilometres (12 mi) south of Husavík.

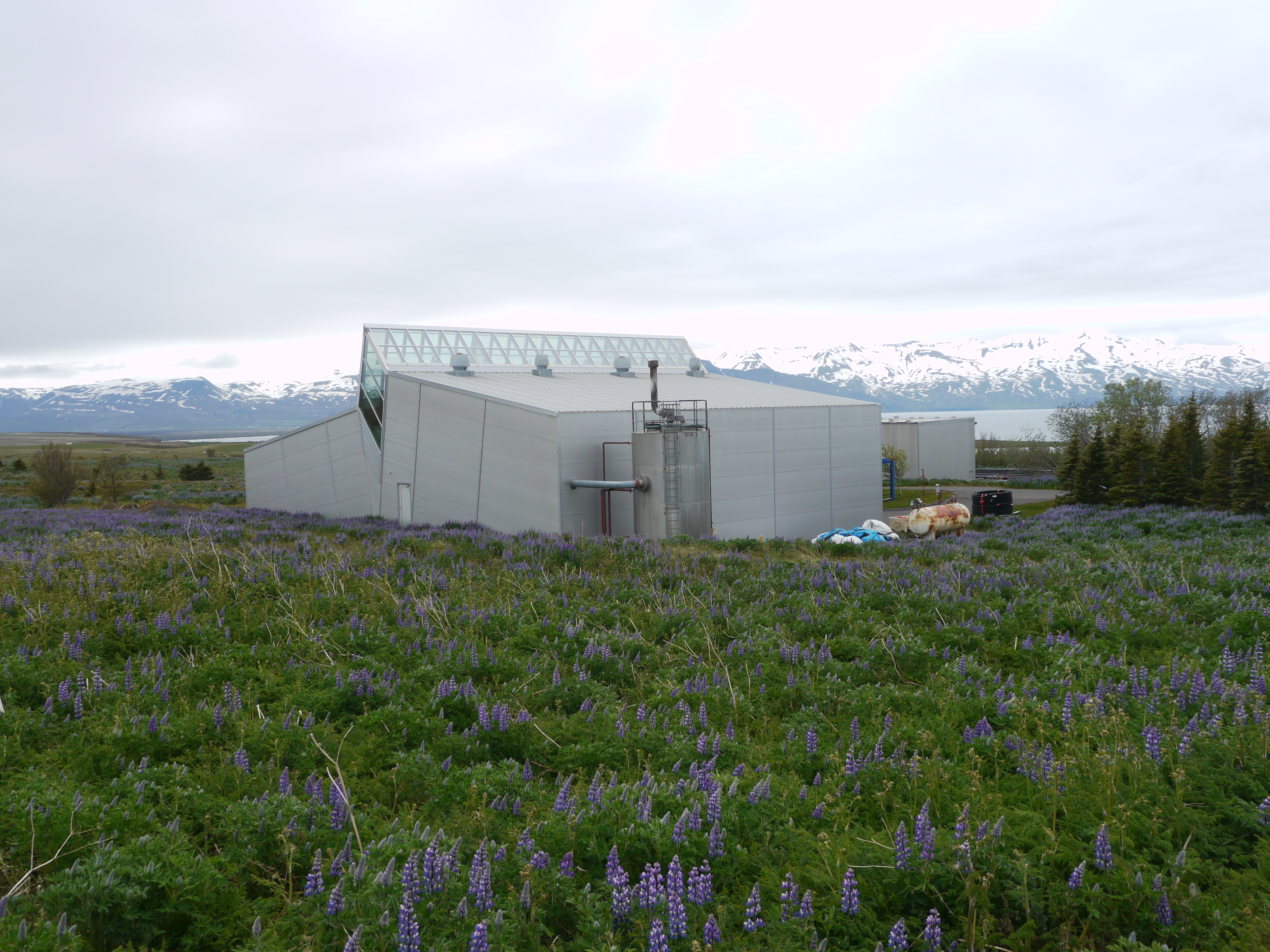
