= Reykjanes power station =

Geothermal power station in Reykjanes, Iceland

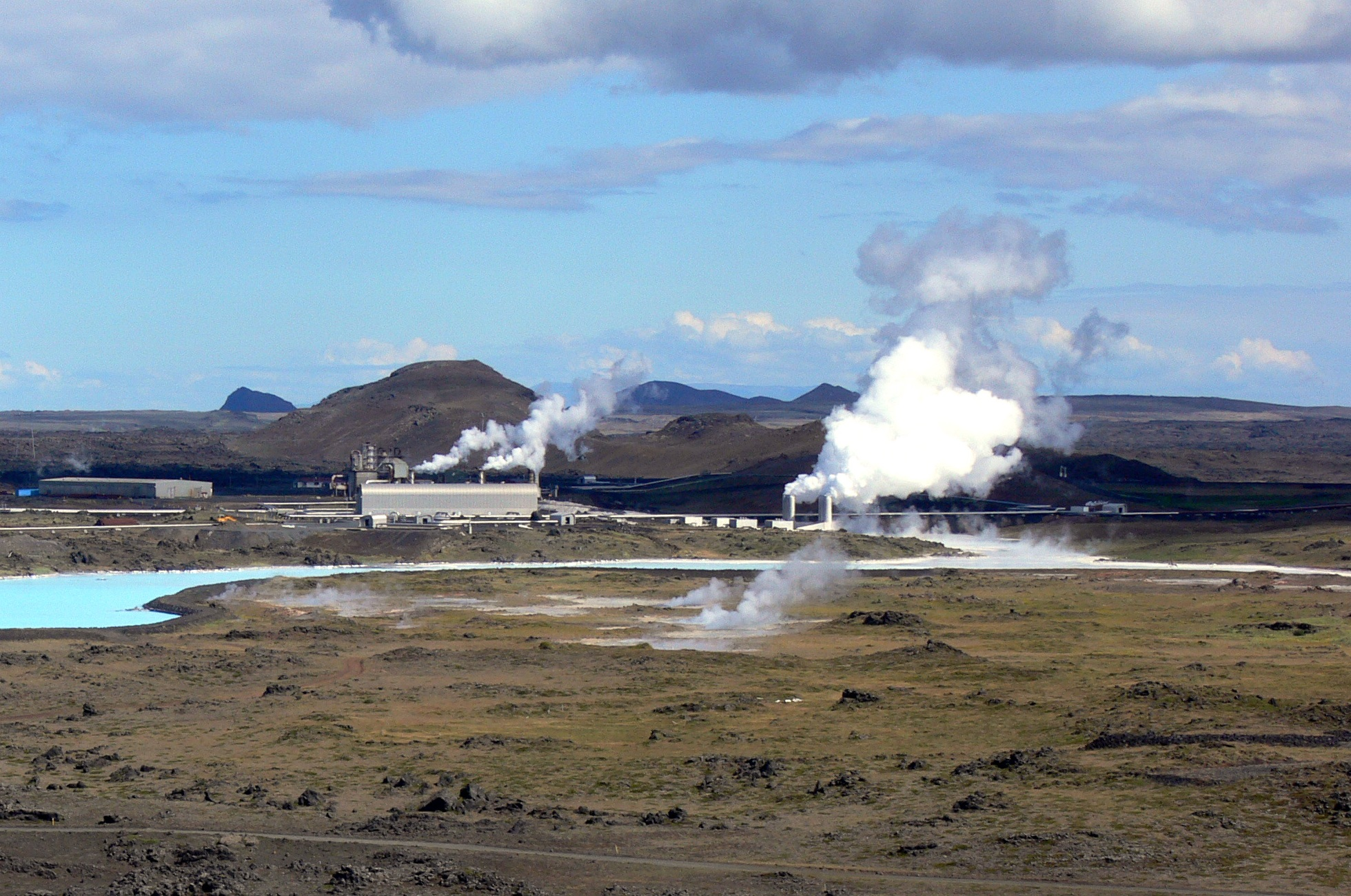
- Reykjanes Power Station
- Official name: Reykjanesvirkjun
- Country: Iceland
- Location: Reykjanes
- Coordinates: 63°49′35″N 22°40′55″W
- Status: Operational
- Commission date: May 2006
- Construction cost: US$100 million
- Owner: HS Orka

Geothermal power station
- Type: Flash steam
- Min. source temp.: 290 °C (550 °F)
- Wells: 12
- Max. well depth: 2,700 m (8,900 ft)

Power generation
- Units operational: 2 × hp 50 MW + 1 lp 30 MW
- Nameplate capacity: 130 MWe

External links
- Commons: Related media on Commons

The Reykjanes power station (known as Reykjanesvirkjun [ˈreiːcaˌnɛsˌvɪr̥cʏn]) is a geothermal power station located in Reykjanes at the south-western tip of Iceland.

As of 2012, the power plant generated 100MWe from two high pressure 50MWe turbines, using steam and brine from a reservoir at 290 to 320 °C (554 to 608 °F), which is extracted from 12 wells that are 2,700 m (8,900 ft) deep. This was the first time that geothermal steam of such high temperature had been used for electrical generation.

In May 2023 a low pressure 30 MWe turbine started operation, bringing the power output of the plant to 130 MWe. The turbine uses medium and a low pressure steam at about 155 °C (311 °F) and 105 °C (221 °F) coming from the separation station that separates steam from geothermal fluid. The residual heat from the cooling water is used to heat sea water for fish farming.

The power plant was open to the public and housed the Power Plant Earth interpretative exhibition. However, the exhibit was closed in June 2018.

From December 2023 staff based at the Reykjanes power station controlled remotely the geothermal Svartsengi power station which was threatened by volcanic activity.

== See also ==
- Geothermal power in Iceland
- List of largest power stations in the world
- List of power stations in Iceland
- Renewable energy in Iceland
