= Hitaveita Suðurnesja =

Icelandic energy company

Hitaveita Suðurnesja (Icelandic pronunciation: [ˈhɪːtaˌveiːta ˈsʏːðʏrˌnɛːsja]) was an Icelandic energy company. The largest shareholder was Reykjanesbær. The company was founded as a geothermal energy firm in the southwest of Iceland in 1974. It built a power plant at Svartsengi to tap the geothermal energy in the area, and was completed in 1976. It was reportedly the first power plant in the world of its kind. It produced and distributed heating and electricity for the entire Sudurnes region.

In May 2008, Parliament passed Act no. 58/2008, amending some laws on natural resources and energy. As a result, Hitaveita Suðurnesja was divided into two independent companies, HS Utilities Ltd., distributing electricity, and HS Orka, heating and freshwater, which came into effect on 1 July 2008.
