= Ásahreppur =

- Municipality
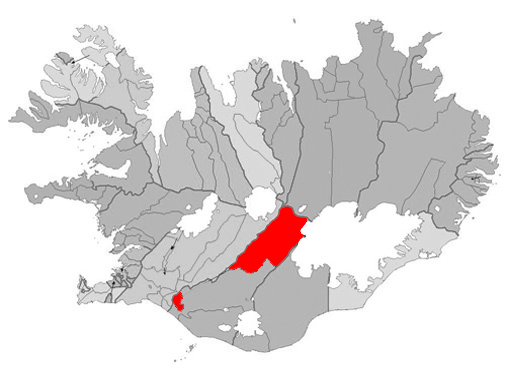
- Location of Ásahreppur

- Location within Iceland
- Coordinates: 64°30′N 18°30′W
- Country: Iceland
- Region: Southern Region
- Constituency: South Constituency

Government
  - Manager: Björgvin G. Sigurðsson

Area
  - Total: 2,942 km^{2} (1,136 sq mi)

Population
  - Total: 193
  - Density: 0.07/km^{2} (0.18/sq mi)
- Municipal number: 8610
- Website: asahreppur.is

Ásahreppur (Icelandic pronunciation: [ˈauːsaˌr̥ɛhpʏr̥]) is a municipality in central Iceland, located on the western edge of Rangárvallasýsla. The name "Ásahreppur" comes from the natural ridges in the area known as "the ásar". The community is bounded by the bridge of Þjórsá river to the west on the Ring Road, and the boundary extends about 500 m (1,600 ft) from Landvegamót to the east. A bridge has existed across Þjórsá since 1895.

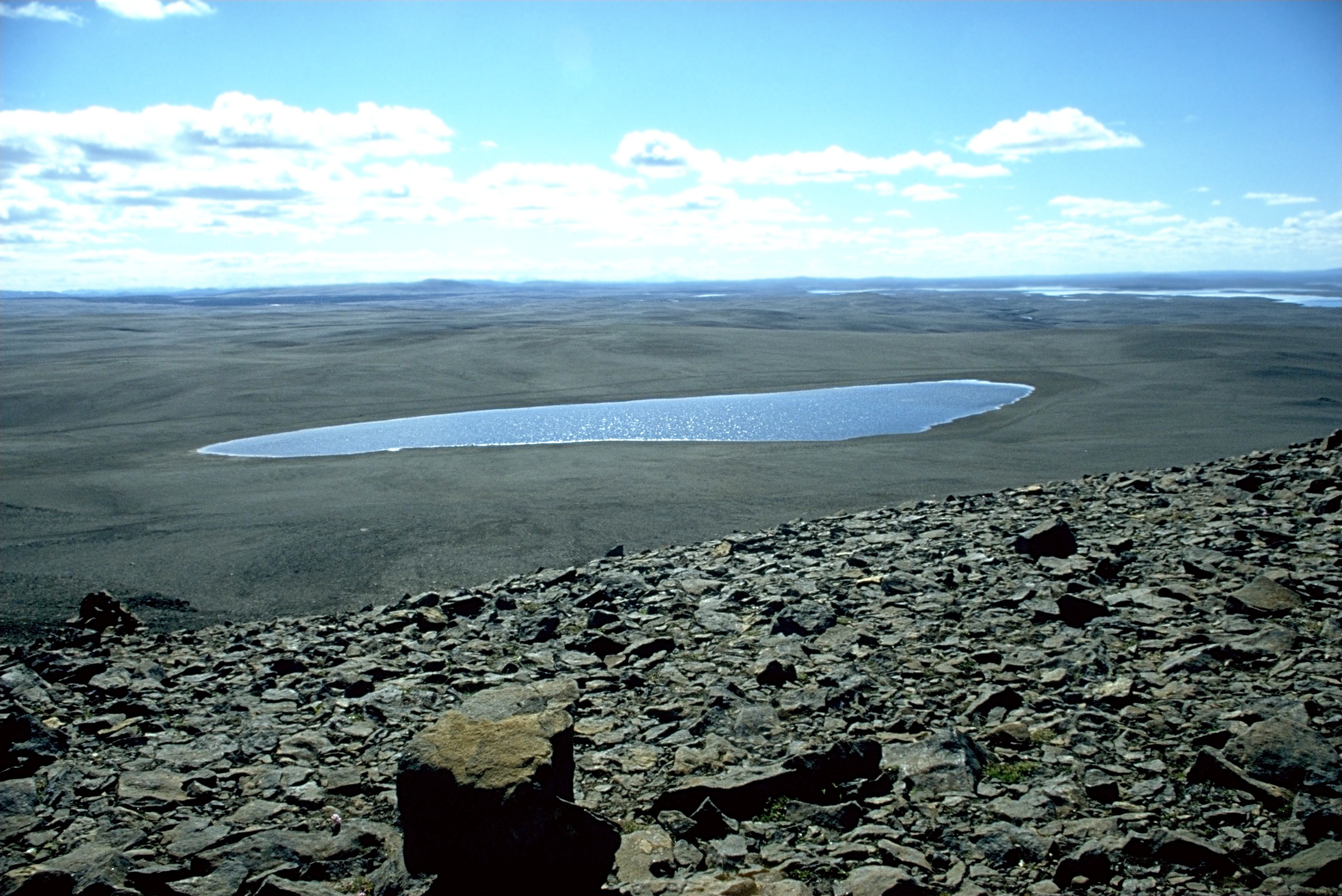
Highlands

The community has a population of approximately 193 people, with agriculture and service being the main sources of employment. The landscape of the area includes a variety of features such as grassy swamps, farm areas, hills, and ridges, with the largest nesting place of the grey lag goose being located in the swampy desolated area of Frakkavatn. The majority of the habitation in Ásahreppur consists of clusters of farms around the ridges (including Vetleifsholtscluster, Áscluster, Ásmundarstaðircluster, Hamracluster, Sumaliðabæjarcluster, and Kálfholtscluster). There are also many artificial caves in the area that were once used as animal houses up until the 20th century, but were reportedly used for human habitation in the first centuries after Iceland was settled.

An hydroelectric power plant was built in Ásahreppur.

Basic services such as schools are provided to the inhabitants of Ásahreppur through cooperation with neighboring communities in Rangárvallasýsla, Skaftárhreppur, and Mýrdalshreppur.
