= Energy in Iceland =

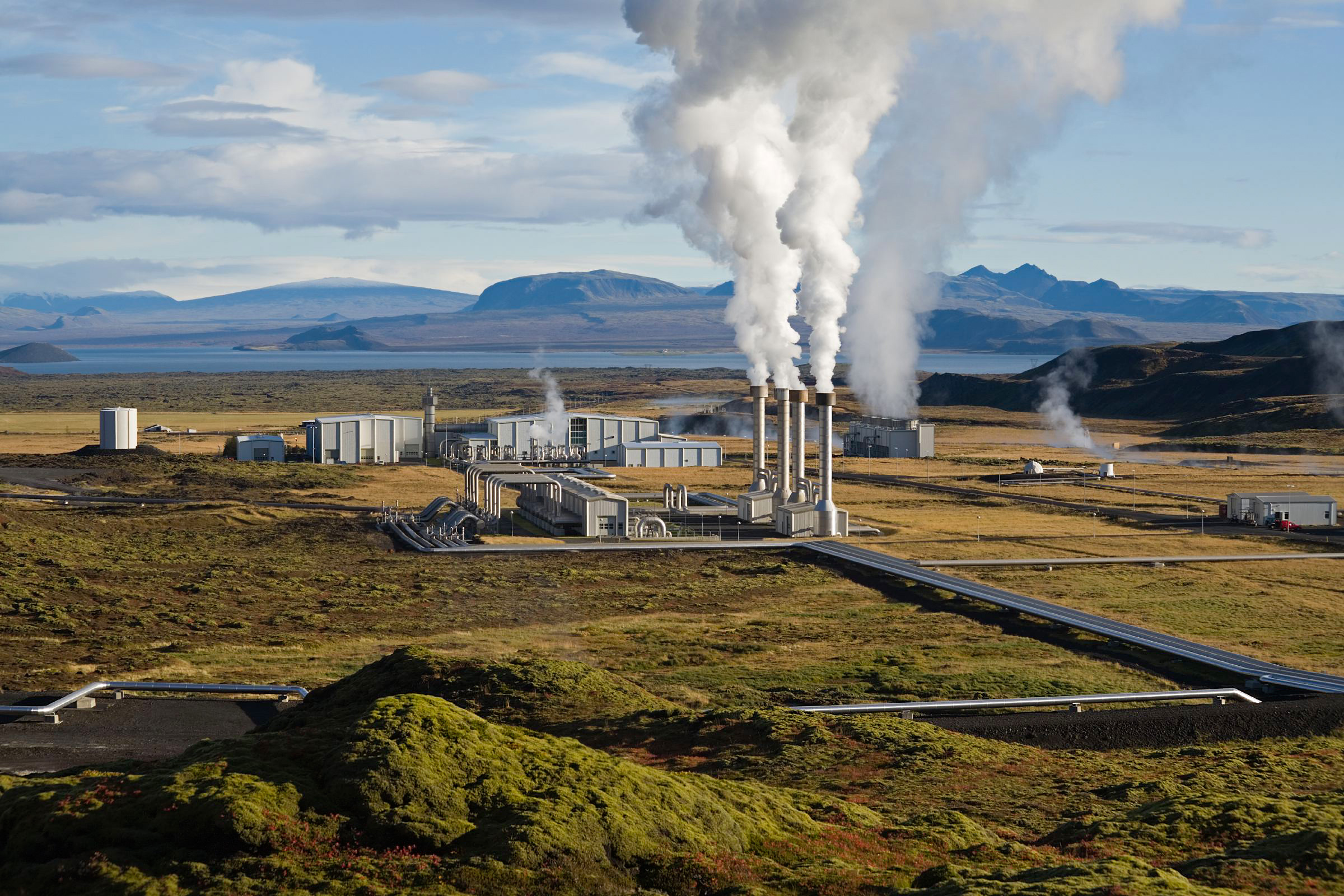
The Nesjavellir Geothermal Power Station

Iceland is a world leader in renewable energy. 100% of the electricity in Iceland's electricity grid is produced from renewable resources. In terms of total energy supply, 85% of the total primary energy supply in Iceland is derived from domestically produced renewable energy sources. Geothermal energy provided about 65% of primary energy in 2016; the share of hydropower was 20%, and the share of fossil fuels (mainly oil products for the transport sector) was 15%.

The Icelandic government aspires that the nation will be carbon neutral by 2040. The largest obstacles to this are road transport and the fishing industry.

In 2025, Iceland's total electricity consumption was 20,243 GWh. Renewable energy provided almost 100% of production, with 70.5% coming from hydropower, 29.4% from geothermal power, and 0.1% from fossil fuels. Only two islands, Grímsey and Flatey, are not connected to the national grid and so rely primarily on diesel generators for electricity. Most of the hydropower plants are owned by Landsvirkjun (the National Power Company), which is the main supplier of electricity in Iceland. Landsvirkjun produces 12,469 GWh which is 75% of the total electricity production in Iceland.

The main use of geothermal energy is for space heating, with the heat being distributed to buildings through extensive district-heating systems. Nearly all Icelandic homes are heated with renewable energy, with 90% of homes being via geothermal energy. The remaining homes that are not located in areas with geothermal resources are heated by renewable electricity instead.

Iceland is the world's largest green energy producer per capita and largest electricity producer per capita, with approximately 55,000 kWh per person per year. In comparison, the EU average is less than 6,000 kWh. Most of this electricity is used in energy-intensive industrial sectors, such as aluminium production, which developed in Iceland thanks to the low cost of electricity.

== Energy resources ==
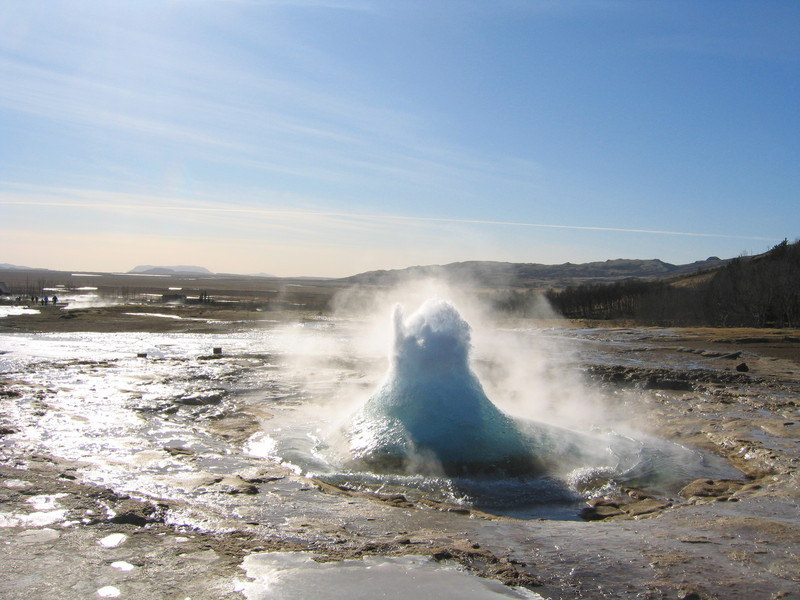
The Strokkur geyser. Lying on the Mid-Atlantic Ridge, Iceland is one of the most geologically active areas on Earth.

Iceland's unique geology allows it to produce renewable energy relatively cheaply, from a variety of sources. Iceland is located on the Mid-Atlantic Ridge, which makes it one of the most tectonically active places in the world. There are over 200 volcanoes located in Iceland and over 600 hot springs. There are over 20 high-temperature steam fields that are at least 150 °C; many of them reach temperatures of 250 °C. This is what allows Iceland to harness geothermal energy, and these steam fields are used for heating everything from houses to swimming pools. Iceland is also starting to use "cold" areas away from the steam fields to produce warm water for space heating. There is a big potential for hydro power, as rivers, especial glacial ones, fall from the high areas and provide big changes in elevation over small distances, due to the mountainous landscape. Iceland has good resources for onshore wind. The two 0.9 MW turbines, Hafið, set up for testing purposes, produce 6.7 GWh/a, that gives 42% of the name plate power averaged over the year, a very high number for an onshore turbine. Offshore wind power is rather unlikely, due to few shallows along the coast.

== Sources ==
Iceland electricity production by source

=== Fossil fuels ===
In 1905 a power plant was set up in Hafnarfjörður, a town which is a suburb of Reykjavík. Reykjavík wanted to copy their success, so Thor Jenssen was appointed to run and build a gas station, Gasstöð Reykjavíkur. Jenssen could not get a loan to finance the project, so a deal was made with Carl Francke to build and run the station, with options for the city to buy him out. Construction started in 1909 and the station was fully built in 1910. The station lit up 120 gas lamps around the city and gave the opportunity to cook with gas too. In 1921, a hydropower plant was built at Elliðarár, which handled the growth of the city. In 1958, the gas station was demolished.

In 1940 Iceland's energy consumption was 70% coal. In the 1950s oil consumption was around 60%. By 1960 coal consumption had fallen below 5% and by 1980 oil was used less than 30%.

=== Hydropower ===
The first hydropower plant was built in 1904 by a local entrepreneur. It was located in a small town outside of Reykjavík and produced 9 kW of power. The first municipal hydroelectric plant was built in 1921, and it could produce 1 MW of power. This plant single-handedly quadrupled the amount of electricity in the country. The 1950s marked the next evolution in hydroelectric plants. Two plants were built on the Sog River, one in 1953 which produced 31 MW, and the other in 1959 which produced 26.4 MW. These two plants were the first built for industrial purposes and they were co-owned by the Icelandic government. This process continued in 1965 when the national power company, Landsvirkjun, was founded. It was owned by both the Icelandic government and the municipality of Reykjavík. In 1969, a 210 MW plant was built on the Þjórsá River that would supply the southeastern area of Iceland with electricity and run an aluminium smelting plant that could produce 33,000 tons of aluminium a year.

This trend continued and increases in the production of hydroelectric power are directly related to industrial development. In 2005, Landsvirkjun produced 7,143 GWh of electricity total of which 6,676 GWh or 93% was produced via hydroelectric power plants. 5,193 GWh or 72% was used for power-intensive industries like aluminium smelting. In 2009, Iceland built its biggest hydroelectric project to date, the Kárahnjúkar Hydropower Plant, a 690 MW hydroelectric plant to provide energy for another aluminium smelter. This project was opposed strongly by environmentalists.

Other hydroelectric power stations in Iceland include: Blöndustöð (150 MW), Búrfellsstöð (270 MW), Hrauneyjafosstöð (210 MW), Laxárstöðvar (28 MW), Sigöldustöð (150 MW), Sogsstöðvar (89 MW), Sultartangastöð (120 MW), and Vatnsfellsstöð (90 MW).

Iceland is the first country in the world to create an economy generated through industries fueled by renewable energy, and there is still a large amount of untapped hydroelectric energy in Iceland. In 2002 it was estimated that Iceland only generated 17% of the total harnessable hydroelectric energy in the country. Iceland's government believes another 30 TWh of hydropower could be produced each year, while taking into account the sources that must remain untapped for environmental reasons.

=== Geothermal power ===
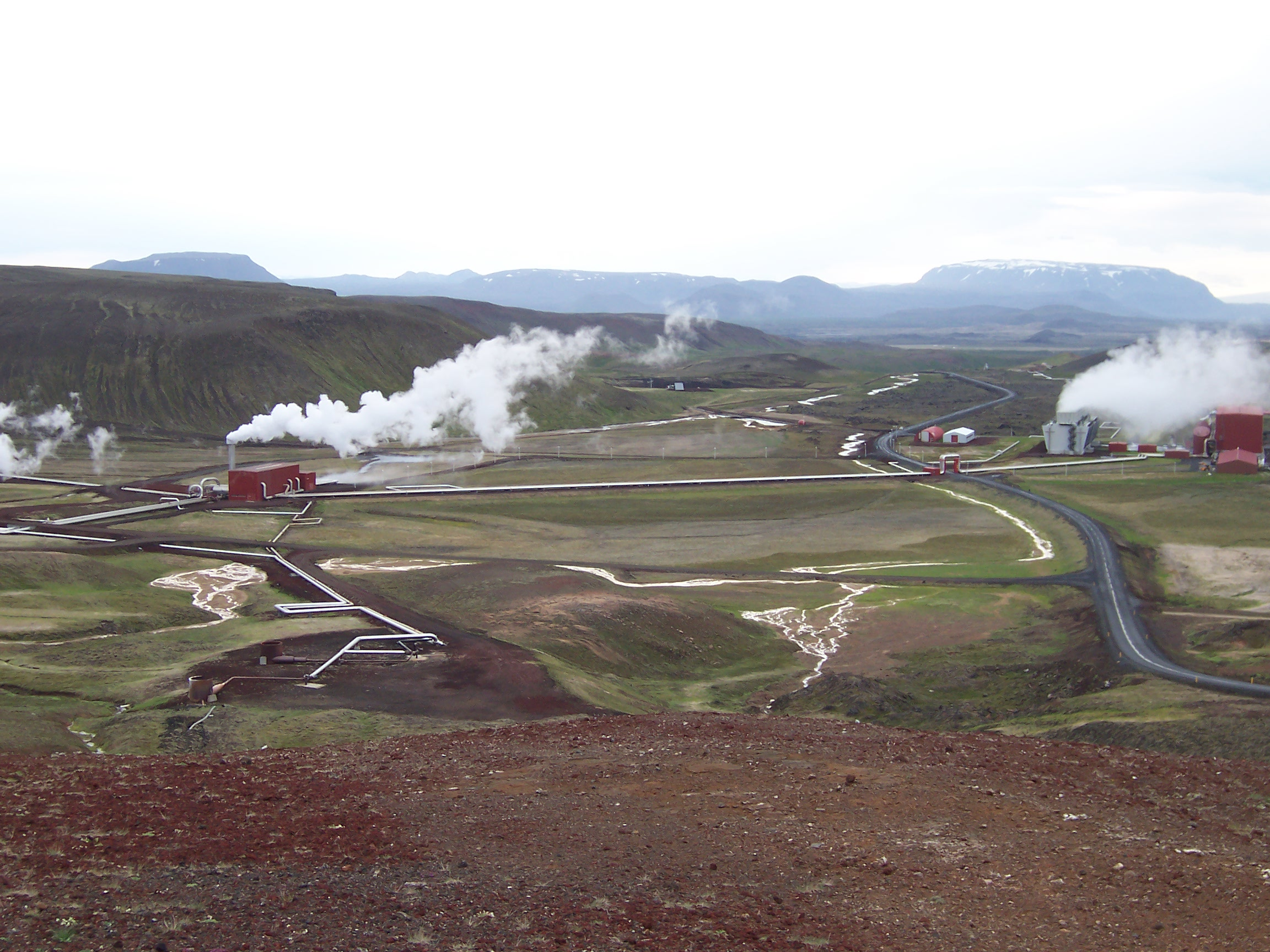
Krafla Geothermal Station

For centuries, the people of Iceland have used their hot springs for bathing and washing clothes. The first use of geothermal energy for heating did not come until 1907 when a farmer ran a concrete pipe from a hot spring to lead steam into his house. In 1930, the first pipeline was constructed in Reykjavík and was used to heat two schools, 60 homes, and the main hospital. It was a 3 km (1.9 mi) pipeline that ran from one of the hot springs outside the city. In 1943 the first district heating company was started with the use of geothermal power. An 18 km (11 mi) pipeline ran through the city of Reykjavík, and by 1945 it was connected to over 2,850 homes.

Currently geothermal power heats 89% of the houses in Iceland, and over 54% of the primary energy used in Iceland comes from geothermal sources. Geothermal power is used for many things in Iceland. 57.4% of the energy is used for space heat, 25% is used for electricity, and the remaining amount is used in many miscellaneous areas such as swimming pools, fish farms, and greenhouses.

The government of Iceland has played a major role in the advancement of geothermal energy. In the 1940s the State Electricity Authority was started by the government in order to increase the knowledge of geothermal resources and the utilization of geothermal power in Iceland. The agency's name was later changed to the National Energy Authority (Orkustofnun) in 1967 and to Icelandic environment and energy agency in 2024. This agency has been very successful and has made it economically viable to use geothermal energy as a source for heating in many different areas throughout the country. Geothermal power has been so successful that the government no longer has to lead the research in this field because it has been taken over by the geothermal industries.

Geothermal power plants in Iceland include Nesjavellir (120 MW), Reykjanes (100 MW), Hellisheiði (303 MW), Krafla (60 MW), and Svartsengi (46.5 MW). The Svartsengi power plant and the Nesjavellir power plant produce both electricity and hot water for heating purposes. The move from oil-based heating to geothermal heating saved Iceland an estimated total of US$8.2 billion from 1970 to 2000 and lowered the release of carbon dioxide emissions by 37%. It would have taken 646,000 tonnes of oil to heat Iceland's homes in 2003.

The Icelandic government also believes that there are many more untapped geothermal sources throughout the country, estimating that over 20 TWh per year of unharnessed geothermal energy is available. This is about 3.3% of the 600 TWh per year of electricity used in Germany. Combined with the unharnessed feasible hydropower, tapping these sources to their full extent would provide Iceland another 50 TWh of energy per year, all from renewable sources.

Iceland's abundant geothermal energy has also enabled renewable energy initiatives, such as Carbon Recycling International's carbon dioxide to methanol fuel process, which could help reduce Iceland's dependence on fossil fuels.

=== Solar power ===
Source: NREL

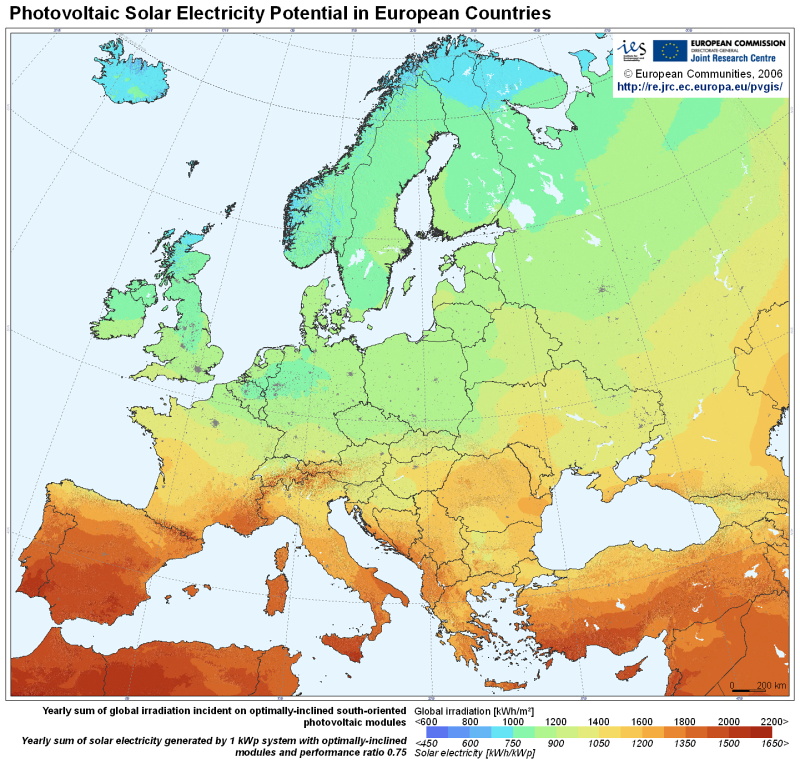
Solar insolation

Iceland has relatively low insolation, due to the high latitude, thus limited solar power potential. The total yearly insolation is about 20% less than Paris, and half as much as Madrid, with very little in the winter.

There are a handful of micro-scale solar power installations in off-grid locations such as mountain huts and remote monitoring and weather stations. Some private organisations have also installed rooftop solar power for their own use.

The first publicly connected solar power installation in Iceland is on the remote island of Grímsey, which has a 12 kW photovoltaic system installed in 2022. As of 2025, there are plans to install a solar power system paired with a battery storage system on another off-grid island, Flatey. Both of these projects are to reduce the dependence of diesel generators on the islands.

=== Wind power ===
As of 2025, there are multiple planned wind farm projects in Iceland, but opposition due to the visual effect on the landscape has led to scrutiny. In 2013 a pilot wind power project was installed by Landsvirkjun, consisting of two 77m high turbines with an output of 1.8MW. On the island of Grímsey, a 36 kW wind turbine was installed in 2022. There are also a handful of small-scale wind turbines installed by private organisations.

In 2015 a wind atlas named icewind was completed.

In 2025, Landsvirkjun began construction of Iceland's first wind farm project called Vaðölduver. It will have an installed power of 120 MW and is projected to commence operations in 2027. The import of all 14 turbines finished in May 2026, after which work began on transporting them to their final destination.

=== Becoming carbon neutral ===
Iceland is moving towards climate neutrality. Iceland generates over 99% of its electricity from renewable sources, namely hydroelectricity (approximately 80%) and geothermal (approximately 20%). Iceland was one of the first nations to get the majority of their power from renewable sources, a goal that Iceland met in the 1970s. Over 99% of electricity production and almost 80% of total energy production comes from hydropower and geothermal. In February 2008, Costa Rica, Iceland, New Zealand and Norway were the first four countries to join the Climate Neutral Network, an initiative led by the United Nations Environment Programme (UNEP) to catalyse global action towards low carbon economies and societies.

According to a 2019 study in the northern Icelandic municipality of Akureyri, low carbon transition will be effective by integrating disconnected carbon flows and establishing intermediary organisations. Reykjavík aims to be carbon neutral by 2040. In 2023 a plant using Carbfix technology, an Icelandic invention, will store up to 3 million tonnes of carbon dioxide in rock, with most of it being imported. In April 2023 it was projected that Iceland will reduce their carbon footprint by 24-26% by 2030, falling short both on their Paris Agreement goal of 29% reduction by 2030 and their personal goal of 55% reduction by 2030. In May 2023 the president of the European Commission and the Icelandic prime minister agreed on a carbon dioxide quota for airplanes in Icelandic airspace until the end of 2026. This was in response to an EU regulation of limiting airplane emissions, that would have affected Iceland.

== Experiments with hydrogen as a fuel ==
Imported oil fulfills most of Iceland's remaining energy needs, the cost of which has caused the country to focus on domestic renewable energy. Professor Bragi Árnason first proposed the idea of using hydrogen as a fuel source in Iceland during the 1970s when the oil crisis occurred. The idea was considered untenable, but in 1999 Icelandic New Energy was established to govern the transition of Iceland to the first hydrogen society by 2050.

In the early 2000s, the viability of hydrogen as a fuel source was considered, and whether Iceland's small population, small scale of the country's infrastructure, and access to natural energy would ease a transition from oil to hydrogen.

=== ECTOS Hydrogen demonstration project ===
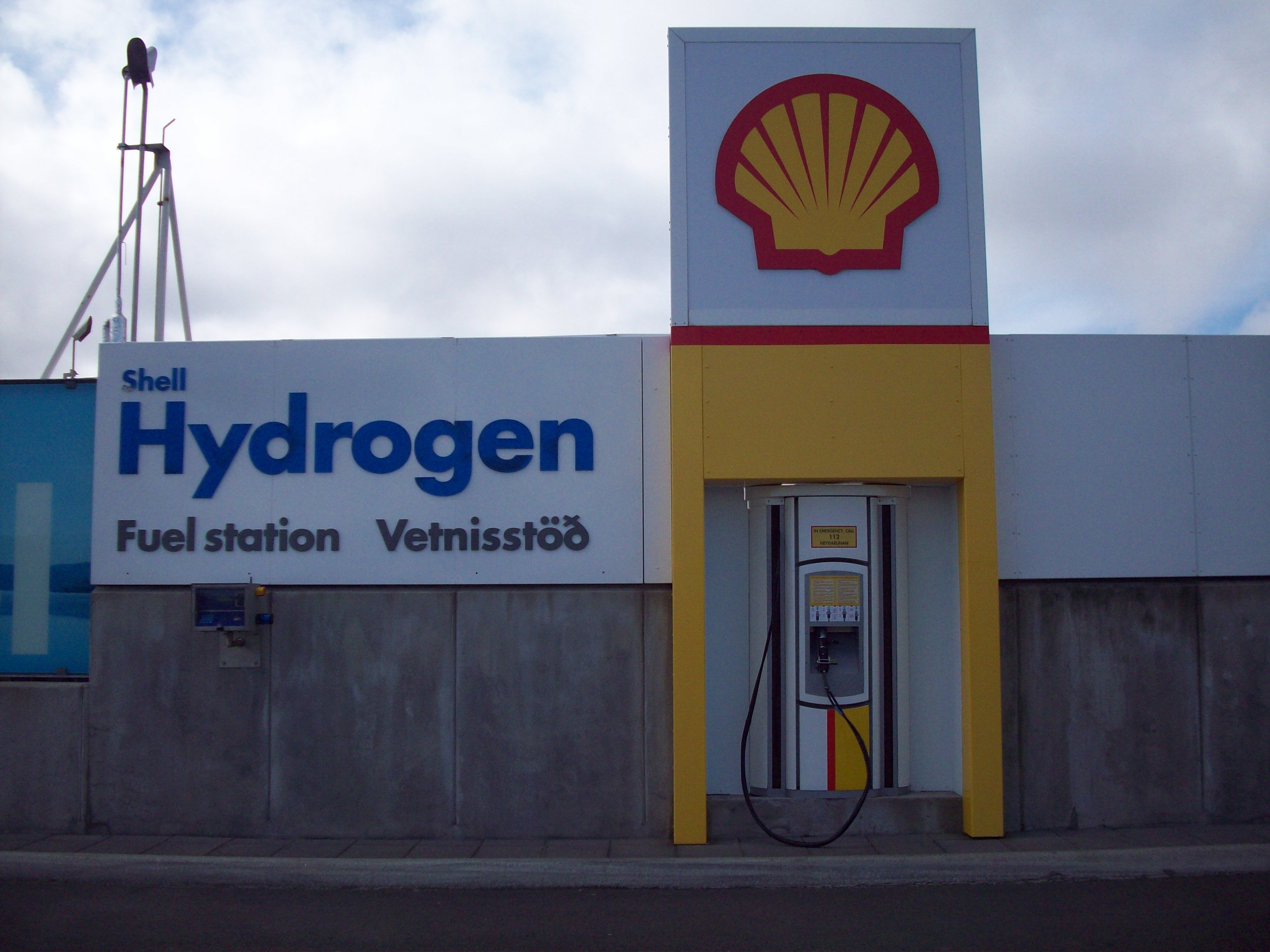
A hydrogen filling station in Reykjavík

The ECTOS (Ecological City Transport System) demonstration project ran from 2003 to August 2005. The project used three hydrogen fuel cell buses and one fuel station, with Strætó bs.

From January 2006 to January 2007 testing of hydrogen buses continued as part of the HyFLEET:CUTE project, which spanned 10 cities in Europe, China and Australia and was sponsored by the European Commission's 6th framework programme. The project studied the long-term effects and most-efficient ways of using hydrogen powered buses. The buses were run for longer periods of time and the durability of the fuel cell was compared to the internal combustion engine, which can theoretically last much longer. The project also compared the fuel efficiency of the original buses with that of new buses from a number of manufacturers.

The country's first hydrogen station opened in 2003 in Reykjavík. To avoid transportation difficulties, hydrogen is produced on-site with electrolysis (breaking down water into hydrogen and oxygen). The hydrogen station was closed in 2010, but was reopened in 2018. Two other hydrogen stations are in the country, one at Miklabraut near Kringlan and the other in Reykjanesbær.

== Education and research ==
Several Icelandic institutions offer education in renewable energy at a university level and research programmes for its advancement:

- University of Iceland in Reykjavík, the country's largest research institution, has a programme in renewable energy.
- Keilir, Atlantic center of excellence in Ásbrú, runs a research center in energy sciences.
- Iceland School of Energy, a subsidiary of Reykjavik University, School of Science and Engineering in Reykjavik, offers M.Sc. studies in renewable energy engineering, policy and science.
- University of Akureyri
- United Nations University - Geothermal Training Programme

Several companies, public and private, are conducting extensive research in the field of renewable energy:

- The National Energy Authority of Iceland is charged with conducting energy research and providing consulting services related to energy development and utilisation.
- Landsvirkjun, the national electric company, conducts research in hydro-electric and geothermal power and funds a great deal of related research.
- The Icelandic Energy Portal is an independent information source on the Icelandic energy sector.
- Iceland Geosurvey (ÍSOR) is a public consulting and research institute providing specialist services to the Icelandic power industry, dedicated mainly to geothermal and hydroelectric research.

== See also ==
- Electricity sector in Iceland
- Geothermal power in Iceland
- Economy of Iceland
- Icelandic New Energy
- Reykjavik Geothermal
- Dreamland: A Self-Help Manual for a Frightened Nation
- Renewable energy in Norway
- Renewable energy in Denmark
- Renewable energy by country

== Bibliography ==
- 19th World Energy Congress. Sustainable Generation and Utilization of Energy The Case of Iceland. Sydney: 2004.
- Bardadottir, Helga. Energy in Iceland. Reykjavik: Hja Godjon O, 2004.
- Bjornsson, Sveinbjorn. Geothermal Development and Research in Iceland. Ed. Helga Bardadottir. Reykjavik: Gudjon O, 2006.
