= Blanda Power Station =

Power station in Iceland

Coordinates: 65°24′57.9″N 19°49′12.0″W

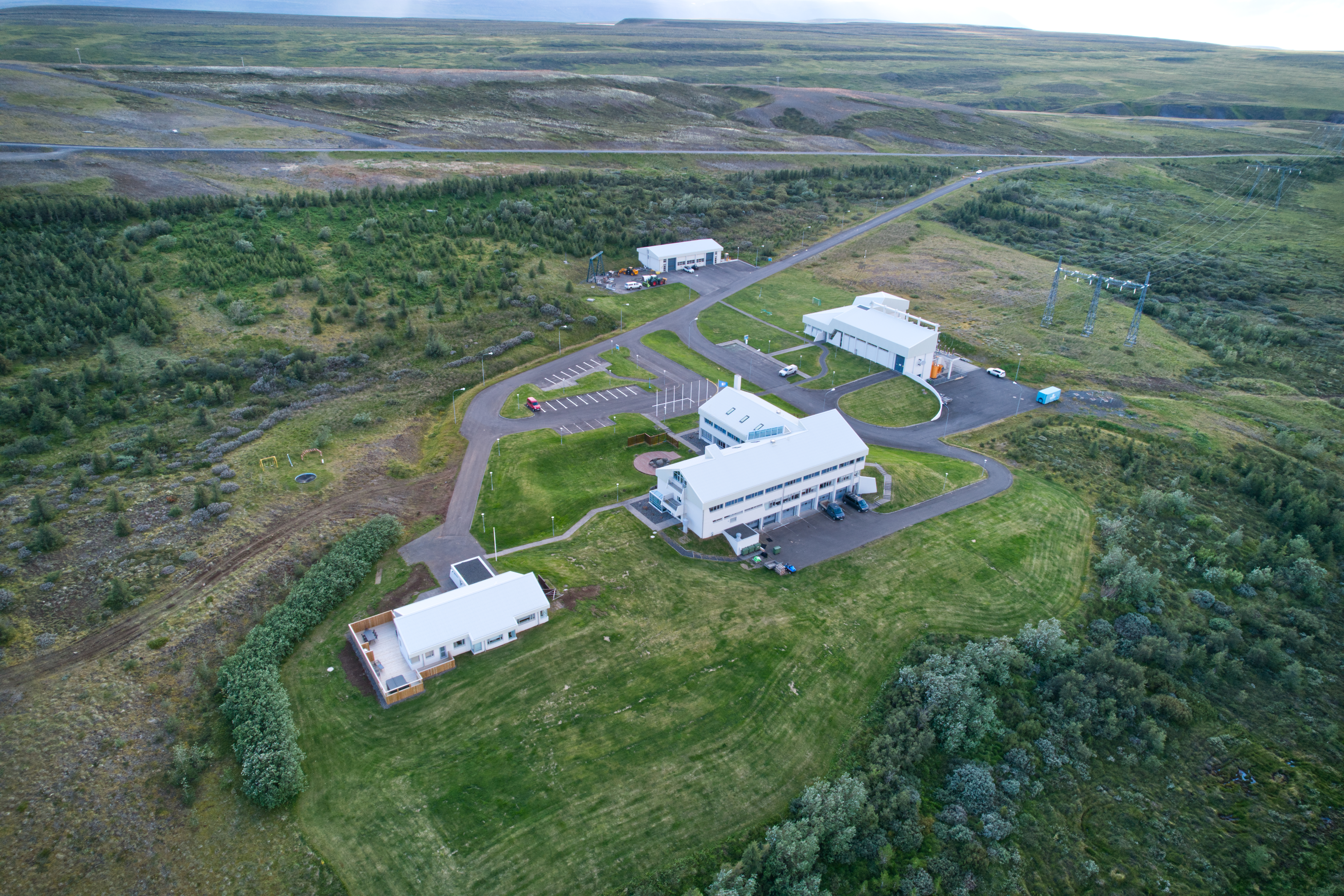
- Blanda power station

- Location within Iceland
- Interactive map of Blanda Power Station
- Country: Iceland
- Operator: Landsvirkjun
- S pillway volumetric flow rate: 60 m^{3}/s (2,100 cu ft/s)

Reservoir
- Normal elevation: 287 m

Power Station
- Commission date: 1991
- Turbines: 3 × 50 MW Francis Turbines
- Installed capacity: 150 MW
- Annual generation: 990 GW·h
- Website; Official website

Blanda Power Station (Icelandic: Blöndustöð [ˈplœntʏˌstœːθ]) is a dam and hydroelectric on the Blanda River within the northern edge of the highlands in Iceland.

The Blanda Station came on-line in 1991. It is located on the northern edge of the high-lands near the end of the Kjalvegur Mountain Road. To the north is a view over the Blöndu-dalur Valley where the River Blanda flows out to the sea near the town of Blönduós. The Blanda Station is an underground plant, located approximately 230 metres below the surface.
