= Grímsnes- og Grafningshreppur =

Coordinates: 64°04′07″N 20°38′35″W

- Municipality
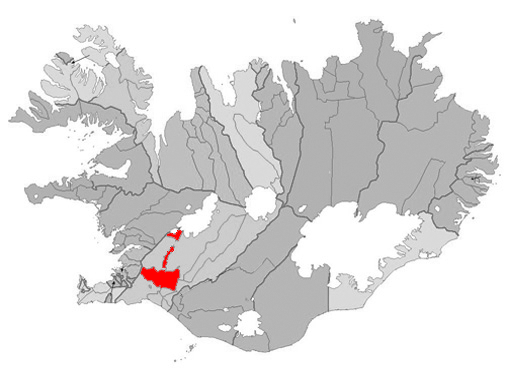
- Location of Grímsnes- og Grafningshreppur

- Location within Iceland
- Country: Iceland
- Region: Southern Region
- Constituency: South Constituency

Government
  - Manager: Ingibjörg Harðardóttir

Area
  - Total: 900 km^{2} (350 sq mi)

Population
  - Total: 650
  - Density: 0.47/km^{2} (1.2/sq mi)
- Municipal number: 8719
- Website: gogg.is

Grímsnes- og Grafningshreppur (Icelandic pronunciation: [ˈkrimsˌnɛːs ɔːɣ ˈkrapniŋsˌr̥ɛhpʏr̥]) is a municipality in the south-western part of Iceland, in the Southern Region. It was formed in 1998 by the merger of Grímsneshreppur and Grafningshreppur. The main settlement is Sólheimar with 80 inhabitants (2006). The settlement Írafoss og Ljósafoss [ˈiːraˌfɔsː ɔːɣ ˈljouːsaˌfɔsː], which still had 15 inhabitants in 1997, has been abandoned since then.
