= Mannvit Engineering =

Icelandic energy engineering firm

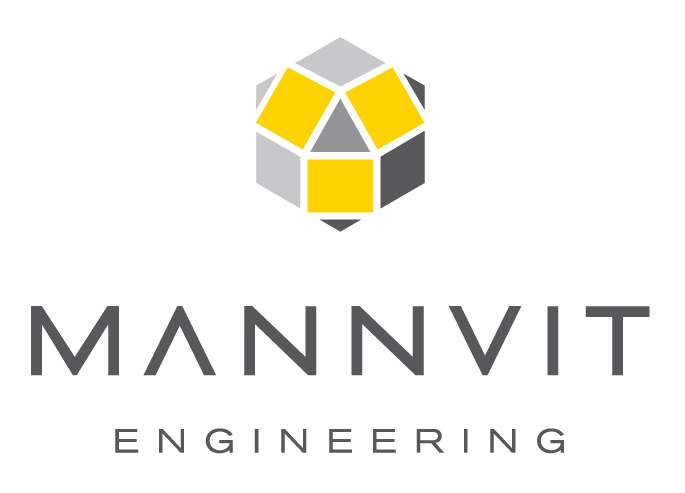
- Company type: Private Limited Company
- Industry: Engineering, renewable energy, sciences and project delivery
- Founded: Iceland (2008)
- Headquarters: Kópavogur, Iceland

Mannvit Engineering (Icelandic pronunciation: [ˈmanːˌvɪːt]) was an engineering firm in Iceland. Mannvit offers engineering, consulting, management, operational and EPCM services to projects all over the world. Mannvit core activities include: geothermal and hydroelectric power development, geothermal district heating, infrastructure and transportation, buildings, renewable energy and climate, environmental consulting, power transmission, industry, IT and telecommunications. Company headquarters were in Kópavogur, Iceland.

== History ==
Founded in 2008, Mannvit is the result of the merger of three long-established engineering companies that were all founded in the 1960s: Hönnun hf., VGK hf. and Rafhönnun hf.

The word 'Mannvit' is an ancient Nordic word, from the Icelandic Sagas meaning Wisdom (literally man-wits).

In 2023 Mannvit was bought by the international consulting group COWI A/S

== Services ==
Mannvit Engineering is a consulting engineering firm that specializes in geothermal, geothermal district heating, hydroelectric, power transmission as well as other renewable energies such as wind power and environmentally-friendly processes, such as hydrogen, biofuels and biogas, anaerobic digestion, waste management, CO_{2} sequestration, carbon dioxide to methanol, and large scale composting. highly specialized technical expertise to service the primary aluminum industry. Additionally, in Iceland the company is involved in infrastructure projects in all fields of design and construction. These include buildings, transportation infrastructure, traffic and planning, environmental studies issues, hydrography measurements, land surveys, geology and acoustics. The company has extensive knowledge in the design of utility systems such, heating, water, data systems or sewage system. Services to these projects include planning, engineering, environmental services, procurement, construction management, project management and EPCM.

Mannvit is a leading consultant in Environmental Impact Assessment (EIA) in Iceland for various industries and projects types, ranging from power to industry. These EIA projects include renewable energy projects, transmission, industrial- and Power-to-X projects.

=== Geothermal ===
Mannvit has participated in the development of most of the geothermal power plants in Iceland, including: Theistareykir Geothermal Power Plant, Hellisheidi Geothermal Power Plant (Combined Heat and Power/Cogeneration/CHP), Nesjavellir Geothermal Power Plant (CHP), Krafla Geothermal Power Plant, Bjarnarflag Geothermal Power Plant, Husavik Kalina Cycle Geothermal Power Plant and the Svartsengi Geothermal Power Plant. Recent international projects include geothermal development in Hungary, Indonesia, Kenya and Ethiopia.

=== Hydroelectric ===
Mannvit has participated in numerous hydroelectric development projects in Iceland and Greenland. Examples include: Karahnjukar hydroelectric power plant in (690 MW), Vatnsfell Power Station (90MW), Búrfellsstöð hydroelectric power plant (270 MW), Hverfisfljóts small hydroelectric power station (3MW), Múlavirkjun small hydroelectric power station (6MW), Djúpadalsvirkjun small hydroelectric power station (2MW), Tasiilaq small hydroelectric plant (1.2W), Amassalik, Greenland, Qorlortorsuaq small hydroelectric power station (8MW), Greenland.
