= Krafla Power Station =

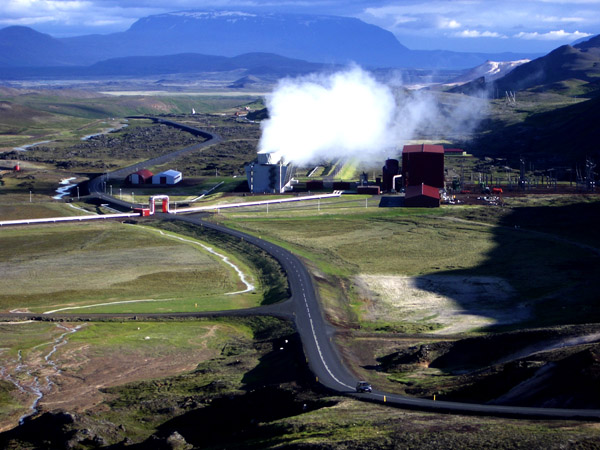
- Krafla Power Station
- Country: Iceland
- Location: Krafla
- Coordinates: 65°42′13.9″N 16°46′23″W
- Status: Operational
- Construction began: 1974
- Commission date: 1977
- Owner: Landsvirkjun

Geothermal power station
- Wells: 42
- Max. well depth: 2,222 m (7,290 ft)

Power generation
- Units operational: 2 x 30 MW
- Make and model: Mitsubishi Heavy Industries
- Nameplate capacity: 60 MW

External links
- Website: landsvirkjun.com
- Commons: Related media on Commons

The Krafla geothermal power plant (Icelandic: Kröflustöð [ˈkʰrœplʏˌstœːθ]) is a geothermal power generating facility located in Iceland, close to the Krafla Volcano and the lake Mývatn. With 42 boreholes, it is able to produce 465 GWh of electricity annually, with an installed capacity of 60 megawatts.

The construction work started in 1974, but due to volcanic activities in the area, building was slowed. The Krafla power station was officially launched in the early 1977, but was only able to produce at its full 60-megawatt capacity after a second steam turbine was installed in 1996.

Originally the power plant was owned by the government, but was purchased in 1985 and has since been operated by Landsvirkjun (National Power Company). About 15 employees work there full-time.

== Geothermal power station details ==
The Krafla geothermal power plant consists of two 30-megawatt units, with double pressure inlet and dual-flow turbines with 5 steps on each side. It takes its energy from 17 high-pressure production wells with 110 kg/second of 7.7 bar and, due to new technologies, 5 low-pressure production wells with 36 kg/s of 2.2 bar.

The other seven wells are not in use. The turbines consume 52.5 and 17.8 kg/s of high- and low-pressure steam each. If the inlet pressure and the mass flow were raised, the output of each turbine could be increased to 35 megawatts.

One of the additional wells (IDDP-1), which was drilled in the Krafla geothermal reservoir in 1999, is known for being the world's hottest geothermal well, since its borehole reaches magma at its lowest point, with a temperature of 430 °C. The right to use the well is owned by Mannvit.

== Project development ==
The construction work of the Krafla geothermal power plant started in 1974, with trial boreholes, after a contract over two planned units was signed.

After the drilling started, seismic and volcanic activities in the area threatened the building of the power station, like the major volcanic eruptions less than 2 km from the power station away, introducing the possibility that it would never start operating at all. Nevertheless, it was finished in early 1977 and was launched in 1978, though the power plant did not work to its full potential until the seismic and volcanic activities strongly declined in 1984 and further boreholes were drilled. In 1996 even more boreholes were drilled and a second turbine was installed, but Krafla was only able to operate at 60 megawatts in 1999, after the renovations were finished, which mainly consisted of renewing the steam gathering system in order to meet the standards for the double pressure inlet to the turbines and the control and safety system in general.

The two companies which were in charge of the engineering of the Krafla geothermal power station since very early in its developing process were Mannvit and Verkís.

== Gallery ==
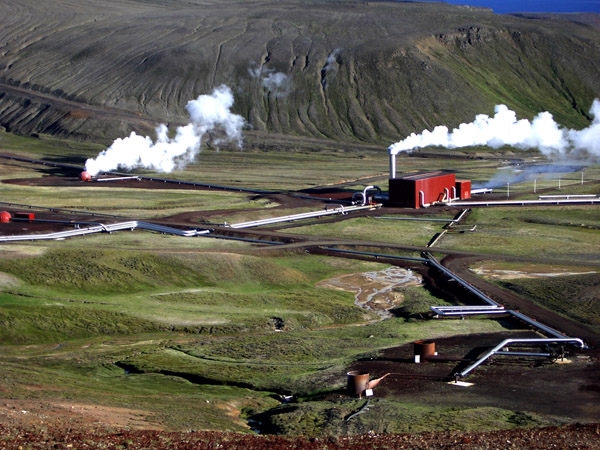

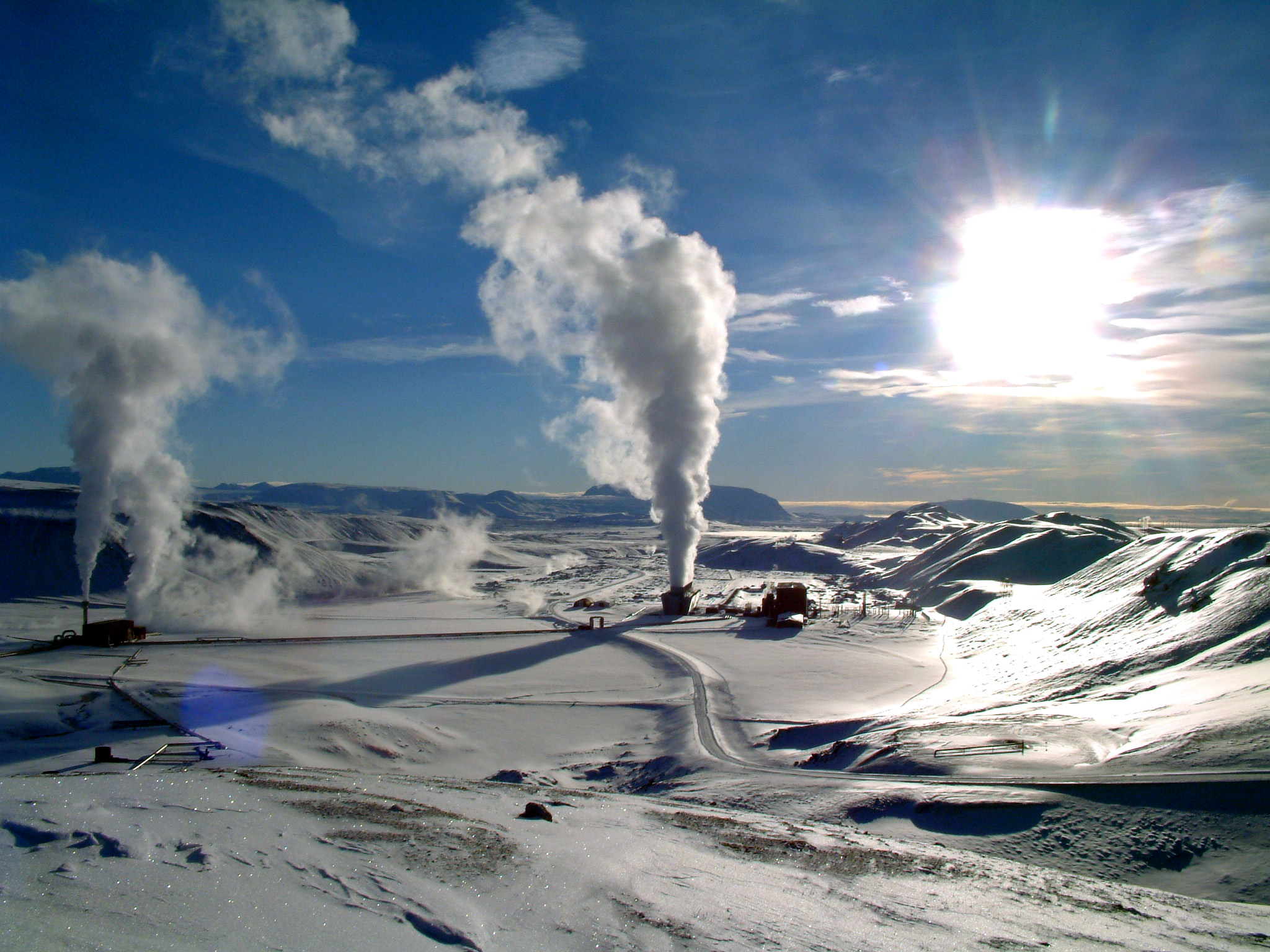

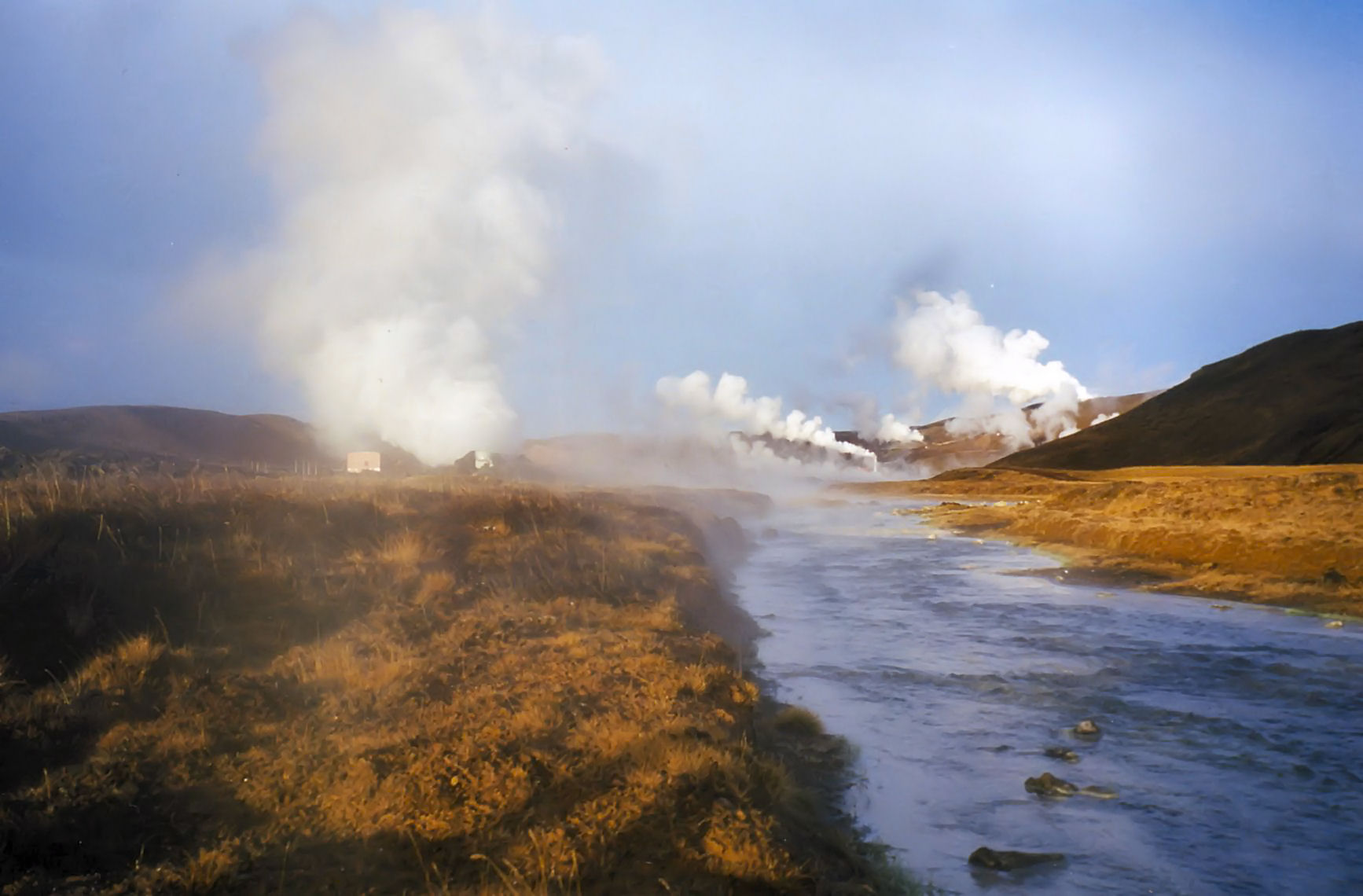

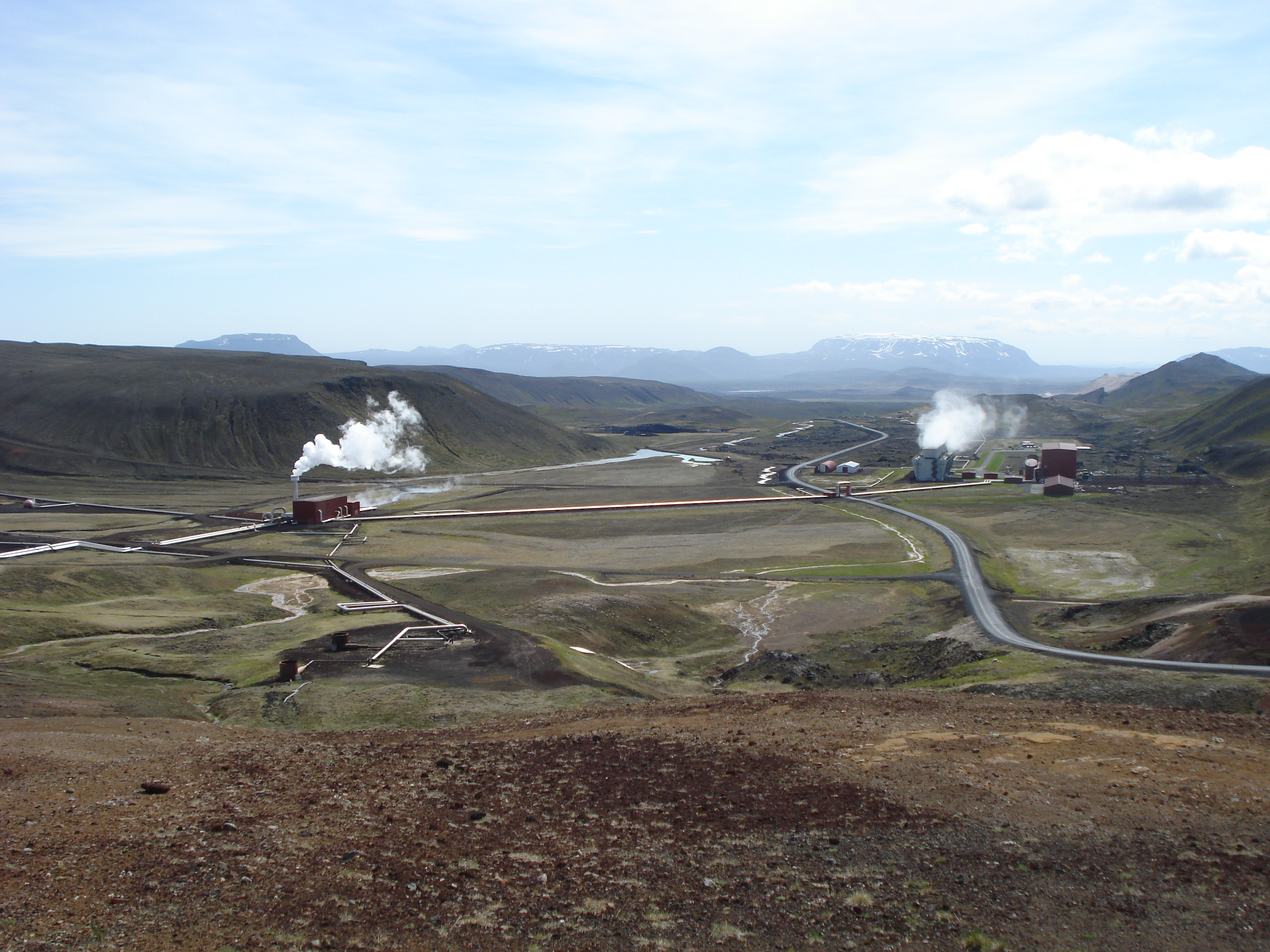

== See also ==
- Geothermal power in Iceland
- List of largest power stations in the world
- Renewable energy in Iceland
