= Vatnsfell Power Station =

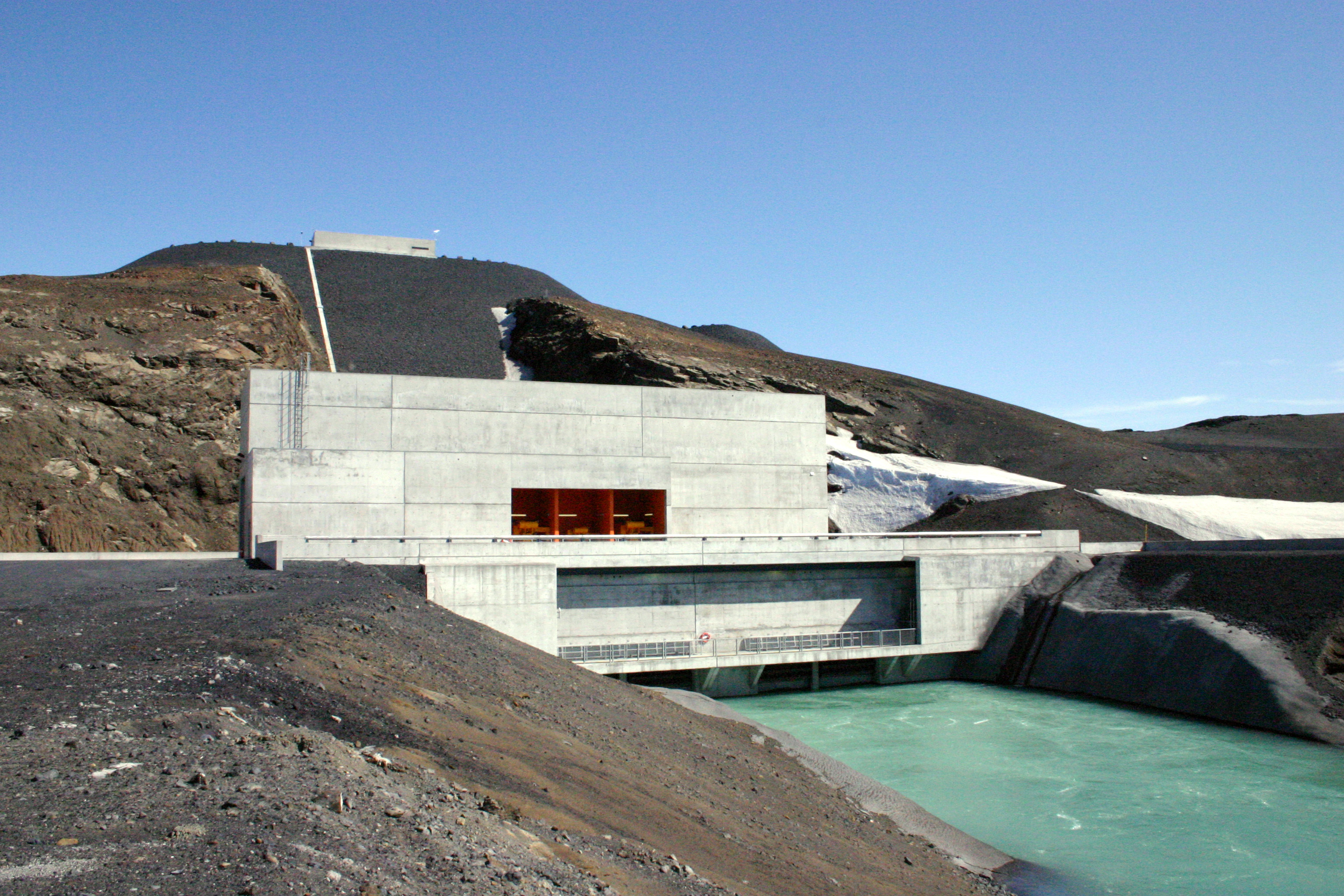

- Location within Iceland
- Country: Iceland
- Location: Highlands of Iceland
- Coordinates: 64.196203°N 19.032636°W
- Status: Operational
- Construction began: 1999
- Opening date: 2001

Dam and spillways
- Impounds: Harnessed river
- Height: 30 m (98 ft)
- Length: 730 m (2,395 ft)
- Spillways: 2
- Spillway type: penstock

Reservoir
- Creates: Lake Thórisvatn
- Catchment area: 2,833 km^{2} (1,094 mi^{2})

Power Station
- Operator: Landsvirkjun
- Commission date: 2001
- Hydraulic head: 67 m (220 ft)
- Turbines: 2 x 45 MW
- Installed capacity: 90 MW

Vatnsfell (Icelandic pronunciation: [ˈvasːˌfɛtl̥]) is an Icelandic hydroelectric power station situated in the Highlands of Iceland, at the south end of lake Þórisvatn, just before the Sprengisandur highland road.

The power station went online in 2001. It is run by Landsvirkjun and generates electricity during the peak demand winter months. The installed capacity is 90 MW, and the head is 67 metres (220 ft). Lead engineering services were provided by Mannvit Engineering.
