= Landsvirkjun =

National Power Company of Iceland

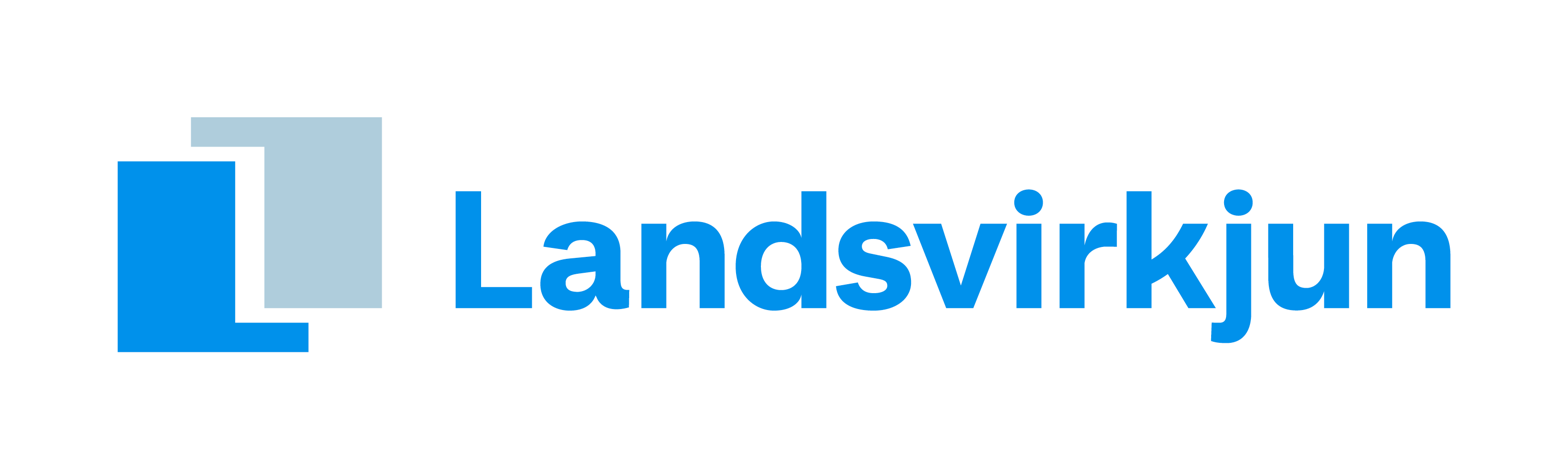
- Company type: public partnership
- Industry: energy
- Founded: 1 July 1965
- Founder: city of Reykjavík the state of Iceland
- Headquarters: Reykjavík, Iceland
- Key people: Jón Björn Hákonarson, chairman Hörður Arnarson, CEO
- Products: electricity
- Owner: the state of Iceland
- Subsidiaries: Landsnet; Landsvirkjun Power; Orkufjarskipti; Icelandic Power Insurance; Hraunaveita
- Website: www.landsvirkjun.com

Landsvirkjun, (Icelandic pronunciation: [ˈlan(t)sˌvɪr̥cʏn]) the National Power Company of Iceland, is Iceland's largest electricity generator. Landsvirkjun operates 21 power plants in Iceland concentrated across five main operational areas.

== History ==
Landsvirkjun was founded on 1 July 1965 by the state of Iceland and the city of Reykjavík. The city of Reykjavík contributed to the company three power stations on the Sog River. Shortly after its founding, construction on the Búrfell hydropower station began. From 1965 until 2005 the purpose of Landsvirkjun was to produce and distribute high-voltage electricity.

The municipality of Akureyri acquired a 5% share in Landsvirkjun in 1983 and became the third owner. Three hydropower stations on the Laxá River previously owned by the municipality of Akureyri were merged into Landsvirkjun.

The hydropower stations Búrfell, Sigalda, Hrauneyjafoss, Blanda, Sultartangi, Vatnsfell, and Fljótsdalsstöð were all built by Landsvirkjun. The geothermal power station Krafla came under Landsvirkjun's ownership in 1985.

Through a new electricity act in 2005, the company's Transmission Division became Landsnet, an independent limited company and a subsidiary of Landsvirkjun. Landsnet owns and operates the Icelandic transmission system and manages the country's electricity system.

Document E2015C0319(01)

In 2007 the state of Iceland took over the ownership shares of Akureyri and Reykjavík in Landsvirkjun, turning it into a public partnership, fully owned by the state of Iceland. In December 2012, Landsvirkjun erected two wind turbines, in an area known as Hafið, within the construction area of Búrfell Power Station, in the south of Iceland. The turbines have a total of 2 MW of installed power.

== Power stations ==
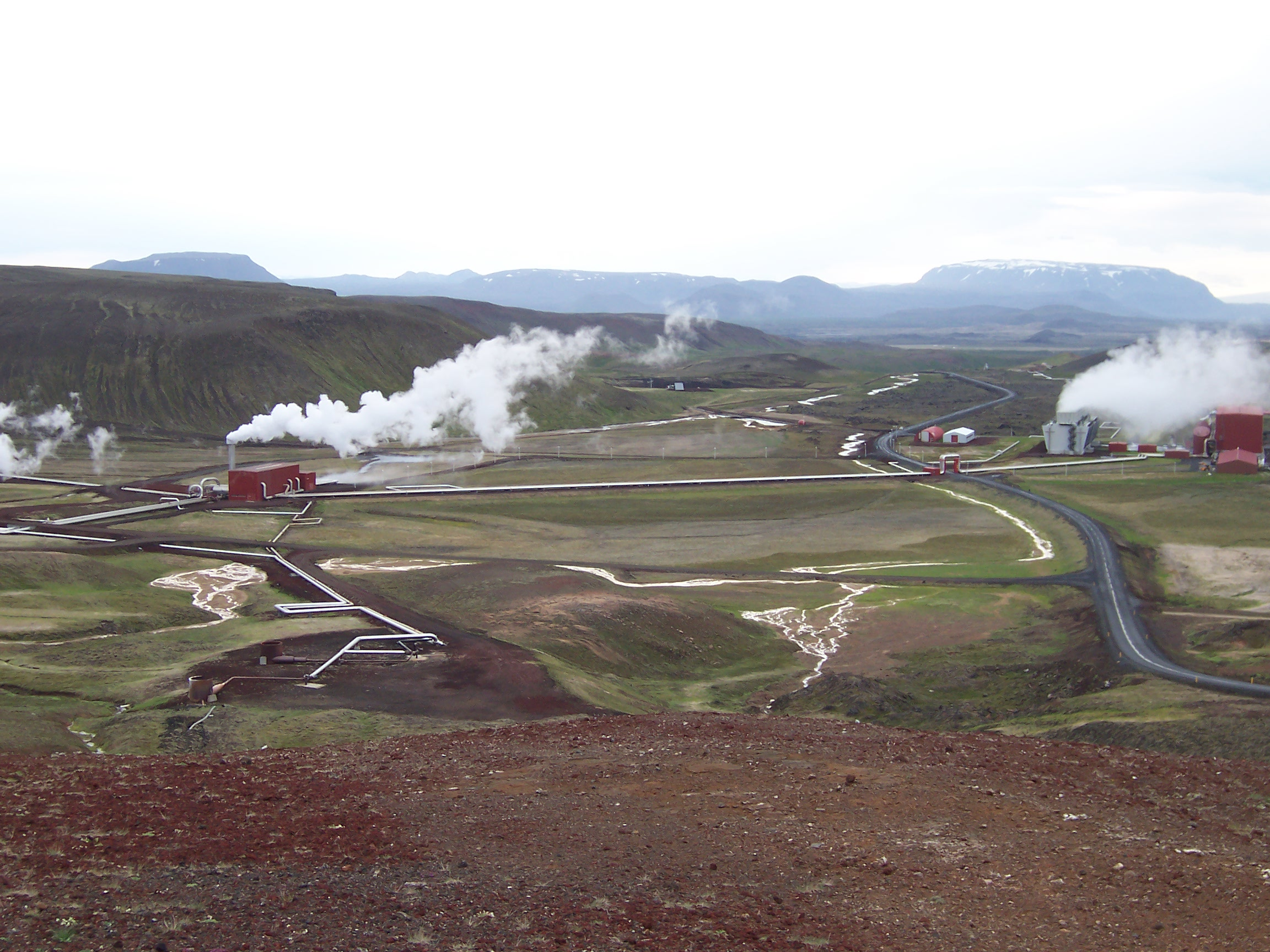
Krafla Geothermal Station

Landsvirkjun has 21 power stations, of which 15 are hydropower stations, three geothermal power stations and two wind power field.

Station	Year built	Type	Nameplate capacity (MW)	Production (GWh/year)	Capacity factor
Laxá I	1939	Hydropower	5	3	6.8%
Laxá II	1953	Hydropower	9	78	98.9%
Laxá III	1973	Hydropower	13.5	92	77.8%
Ljósafoss	1937	Hydropower	16	105	74.1%
Írafoss	1953	Hydropower	48	236	56.1%
Steingrímsstöð	1959	Hydropower	27	122	51.6%
Búrfell	1969	Hydropower	270	2300	97.2%
Sigalda	1978	Hydropower	150	920	70.0%
Hrauneyjafoss	1981	Hydropower	210	1300	70.7%
Blanda	1991	Hydropower	150	990	75.3%
Sultartangi	1999	Hydropower	125	1020	93.1%
Vatnsfell	2001	Hydropower	90	490	62.1%
Fljótsdalur	2007	Hydropower	690	4800	79.4%
Búðarháls	2014	Hydropower	95	585	70.3%
Krafla	1977	Geothermal	60	500	95.1%
Bjarnarflag	1969	Geothermal	5	42	95.9%
Theistareykir	2017	Geothermal	90	738	93.6%
Hafið	2013	Windpower	1.8	6.7	42.5%
Sum by type (calculated figure)		Hydropower	1898.5	13041	78.4%
Sum by type (calculated figure)		Geothermal	155	1280	94.3%
Sum total (calculated figure)		All types combined	2055.3	14327.7	79.6%

== Subsidiaries ==
Landsvirkjun has five subsidiaries:

- Landsnet (64.7% of shares are owned by Landsvirkjun) is the transmission system operator (TSO) of the Icelandic high-voltage electricity grid.
- Landsvirkjun Power uses Landsvirkjun's knowledge to conduct consultancy projects in matters related to energy on the international market.
- Orkufjarskipti provides telecommunication services.
- Icelandic Power Insurance is a captive insurance company, which handles insurance and reinsurance for Landsvirkjun's power stations and, in addition, supervises insurance for construction projects.
- Hraunaveita ehf. took on specific tasks in connection with the Kárahnjúkar Project, but now has no operations.

== See also ==
- List of power stations in Iceland
