= CCT =

CCT may refer to:

== Computation ==
- Computational complexity theory
- Computer-Controlled Teletext, an electronic circuit, see Teletext
- Internet Computer Chess Tournament

== Economics ==
- Compulsory Competitive Tendering, see Best Value#Background
- Conditional cash transfer
- Currency Carry Trade, see Carry (investment)

== Education ==
- Center for Computation and Technology at Louisiana State University, USA
- Clarkson College of Technology, the original name of Clarkson University
- Communication, Culture & Technology, M.A. program at Georgetown University
- College of Ceramic Technology at Kolkata, India
- Centre for Converging Technologies, University of Rajasthan at Jaipur, India
- Cisco Certified Technician, an IT certification from Cisco Systems

== Government ==
- Congo Chine Télécoms, now Orange RDC, a company of the Democratic Republic of the Congo
- Constitutional Court of Thailand
- United States Air Force Combat Control Team

== Medicine and psychology ==
- Cardiovascular computed tomography
- Caring Cancer Trust
- Central corneal thickness
- Certificate of Completion of Training, which doctors in the UK receive on completion of their specialist training
- Client-Centered Therapy, see Person-centered psychotherapy
- Cognitive complexity theory
- Controlled Cord Traction, a technique used to manage certain types of Postpartum haemorrhage
- Cortical collecting tubule in kidney

== Religion ==
- Christian Churches Together, an ecumenical organization
- Christian Community Theater, a theater program for ages eight to adult
- Churches Conservation Trust, a charity to conserve redundant churches in England

== Science ==
- Carbon capture technology, various technologies used in carbon capture
- Certified Calibration Technician, an American Society for Quality (ASQ) certification
- Coal pollution mitigation ("clean coal") technology
- Cold cathode tube
- Colossal carbon tube
- Continuous cooling transformation
- Correlated color temperature
- GCxGC
- Catch connective tissue
- CCT, a codon for the amino acid Proline

== Social science ==
- Consumer culture theory

== Sports ==
- Coca-Cola Tigers, former basketball team

== Time zones ==
- Cocos Islands Time

== Transportation ==
- California Coastal Trail
- Capital Crescent Trail, Washington, DC
- Central California Traction Company, railroad in California, reporting marks CCT
- Cobb Community Transit serving Cobb County Georgia (US), now known as CobbLinc
- Corridor Cities Transitway, a proposed transit line in Montgomery County, Maryland
- Cotswold Canals Trust, a canal restoration trust in southern England
- Covered Carriage Truck, a Mk1 British Rail carriage
- Cross City Tunnel, a road tunnel in Sydney
