= Brynhildur Davíðsdóttir =

Icelandic economist

Brynhildur Davidsdottir
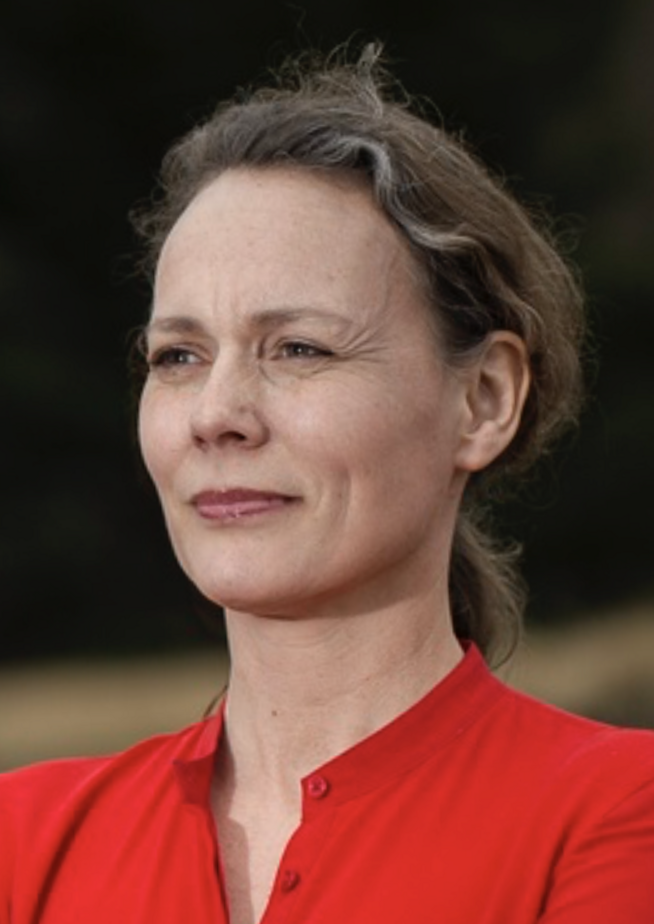
- Brynhildur Davidsdottir, in 2020.
- Born: 29 July 1968 (age 57)
- Occupations: Professor of environment and natural resources
- Organization: University of Iceland

Brynhildur Davíðsdóttir (or Brynhildur Davidsdottir; born 29 July 1968) is a professor of environment and natural resources at the University of Iceland, the academic director of the Environment and Natural Resources graduate programme as well as the director of University of Iceland Arctic Initiative.

Brynhildur, a native of Iceland, originally studied biology and economics at University of Iceland and later System dynamics in the context of climate change mitigation and energy transitions. Drawing on her background in biology and economics she also has focused on evaluation of ecosystem services in various contexts as well as sustainability indicators.

In addition to her academic commitments, she actively participates in policy-making and sits currently on a government-appointed committee tasked to create future energy policy for Iceland. She has since 2008 been responsible for assessing greenhouse gas mitigation options for the Icelandic government, sits on the government-appointed science committee on climate change impact in Iceland, and is the vice chair of the Icelandic Climate Council.

Brynhildur is an active board member of several foundations and companies. She is the chairman of the board of Reykjavik Energy, the second largest energy company in Iceland. Reykjavik Energy´s operation in Hellisheiði is the site of the CarbFix project. In the CarbFix project, carbon dioxide is captured from the emissions from the geothermal power plant in Hellisheiði. It is then dissolved in water and injected into subsurface basalts. Research has confirmed that the injected CO_{2} becomes solidified into calcite in two years, effectively turning carbon dioxide into stone. Brynhildur also sits on the board of the Arctic Circle Foundation, which is a foundation that hosts one of the largest annual international gathering on the Arctic.

In March 2020, Dr. Davidsdóttir was appointed to the Scottish Council of Economic Advisers.

== Academic career ==
Brynhildur completed a BS degree in biology from University of Iceland in 1991, and a preparatory programme in to a degree in economics from University of Iceland in 1992. She completed a dual MS degree from Boston University in International Relations and Environment and natural resource management and a PhD from Boston University Center for Energy and Environmental Studies.

After completing her PhD in 2002, she was an adjunct lecturer at Boston University until 2005. She was a research associate at University of Maryland College Park from 2004 - 2005, and an associate at Abt Associates Inc from 2004 to 2006. In 2006 she moved to Iceland, and became a professor at University of Iceland, tasked with building an international and interdisciplinary graduate programme focused on Environment and Natural Resources. In 2012, Brynhildur received the University of Iceland´s highest honor for excellence in teaching and in 2018 was honored as the Scientist of the year by the Icelandic Science Academy.

== Selected publications ==
Brynhildur's research has focused on four main areas; energy transitions, climate change mitigation, sustainability measurement indicators and ecosystem services.

D Cook, L Malinauskaite, B Davíðsdóttir, H Ögmundardóttir, J Roman, 2020,
Reflections on the ecosystem services of whales and valuing their contribution to human well-being,
Ocean & Coastal Management 186, 105100. Reflections on the ecosystem services of whales and valuing their contribution to human well-being

N Spittler, B Davidsdottir, E Shafiei, J Leaver, EI Asgeirsson, H Stefansson, 2020,
The role of geothermal resources in sustainable power system planning in Iceland,
Renewable Energy, 153: 1081-1090. The role of geothermal resources in sustainable power system planning in Iceland

E Shafiei, B Davidsdottir, H Stefansson, EI Asgeirsson, R Fazeli, M. Gestsson, J Leaver, 2019,
Simulation-based appraisal of tax-induced electro-mobility promotion in Iceland and prospects for energy-economic development,
Energy Policy 133, 110894 Simulation-based appraisal of tax-induced electro-mobility promotion in Iceland and prospects for energy-economic development

JÖG Jónsson, B Davíðsdóttir, NP Nikolaidis, GV Giannakis, 2019,
Tools for Sustainable Soil Management:
Soil Ecosystem Services, EROI and Economic Analysis, Ecological Economics 157 (C), 109-119. Tools for Sustainable Soil Management: Soil Ecosystem Services, EROI and Economic Analysis

L Malinauskaite, D Cook, B Davíðsdóttir, H Ögmundardóttir, J Roman, 2019,
Ecosystem services in the Arctic: a thematic review,
Ecosystem services 36, 100898 Ecosystem services in the Arctic: a thematic review

D Cook, R Fazeli, B Davíðsdóttir, 2019,
The need for integrated valuation tools to support decision-making–The case of cultural ecosystem services sourced from geothermal areas,
Ecosystem Services 37, 100923 The need for integrated valuation tools to support decision-making – The case of cultural ecosystem services sourced from geothermal areas

Shafiei, E., B. Davidsdottir, R. Fazeli, J. Leaver, H. Stefansson, E.I. Asgeirsson, 2018,
Macroeconomic effects of fiscal incentives to promote electric vehicles in Iceland: Implications for government and consumer costs,
Energy Policy, 114:431- 443. Macroeconomic effects of fiscal incentives to promote electric vehicles in Iceland: Implications for government and consumer costs

AM Eikeset, AB Mazzarella, B Davíðsdóttir, DH Klinger, SA Levin and N Stenseth, 2018,
What is blue growth? The semantics of “Sustainable Development” of marine environments,
Marine Policy 87: 177-179. What is blue growth? The semantics of “Sustainable Development” of marine environments

Shafiei, E., B Davidsdottir, J Leaver, H Stefansson, EI Asgeirsson, 2017,
Energy, economic, and mitigation cost implications of transition toward a carbon-neutral transport sector: A simulation-based comparison between hydrogen and electricity,
Journal of Cleaner Production 141, 237-247. Energy, economic, and mitigation cost implications of transition toward a carbon-neutral transport sector: A simulation-based comparison between hydrogen and electricity

Shortall R., B Davidsdottir, 2017,
How to measure national energy sustainability performance: An Icelandic case-study,
Energy for Sustainable Development 39, 29-47. How to measure national energy sustainability performance: An Icelandic case-study

Jónsson JÖG, B Davíðsdóttir, NP Nikolaidis, 2017,
Valuation of Soil Ecosystem Services, Advances in Agronomy,
vol: 142: 353-384. Advances in Agronomy

Cook D., NM Saviolidis, B Davíðsdóttir, L Jóhannsdóttir, 2017,
Measuring countries’ environmental sustainability performance—The development of a nation-specific indicator set, Ecological Indicators,
74: 463-478. Measuring countries’ environmental sustainability performance—The development of a nation-specific indicator set

IEA, 2016,
Nordic Energy Technology Perspectives Pathways to a Carbon Neutral Energy Future, IEA and NER, Paris.
(BD led the Icelandic team in this IEA effort). Nordic Energy Technology Perspectives 2016 – Nordic Energy Research

Shafiei, E., B Davidsdottir, J Leaver, H Stefansson, EI Asgeirsson, 2015,
Comparative analysis of hydrogen, biofuels and electricity transitional pathways to sustainable transport in a renewable-based energy system,
Energy 83:614-627. Macroeconomic effects of fiscal incentives to promote electric vehicles in Iceland: Implications for government and consumer costs
