= Orca (carbon capture plant) =

Facility that uses direct air capture to remove carbon dioxide

Coordinates: 64.04622°N 21.39973°W

The Orca carbon capture plant is a facility that uses direct air capture to remove carbon dioxide from the atmosphere. The name "Orca" comes from the Icelandic word "orka", which means "energy". It was constructed by Climeworks and is joint work with Carbfix, an academic-industrial partnership that has developed a novel approach to capture CO_{2}. The plant uses dozens of large fans to pull in air and pass it through a filter. The filter is then released of the CO_{2} it contains through heat. The CO_{2} extracted is later mixed with water and pushed into the ground, using a technology from Carbfix.

The plant started sequestering carbon dioxide in 2021. It is said to have cost between $10–15 million to build. It is located in Iceland and is the largest facility of its kind on earth. It is located about 50 kilometers outside Reykjavík next to the Hellisheiði Power Station, which is run by Reykjavík Energy. It was inaugurated on 8 September 2021 in presence of Katrín Jakobsdóttir, the prime minister of Iceland.

== Carbon offsetting potential ==
Climeworks claims that the plant can capture 4000 tons of CO_{2} per year. This equates roughly to the emissions from about 870 cars. A May 2025 report said the plants has so far only captured a small portion of that amount, not even enough to cover emissions produced to generate the electricity used by the plant. In August 2024, BeZero Carbon assigned Orca its first-ever AAA rating for a direct air capture carbon removal project.

It counts Microsoft founder Bill Gates and the reinsurance company Swiss Re as current customers.
