= Pörner Group =

Austrian company

Pörner Ingenieurgesellschaft mbH
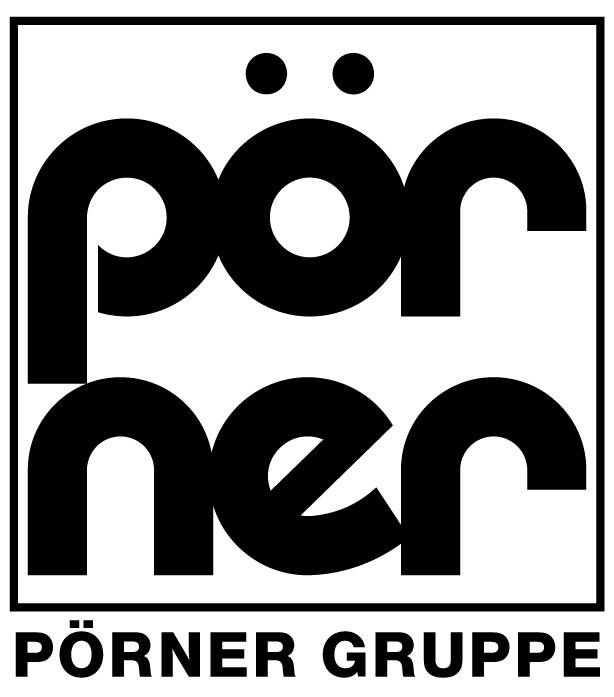
- Company type: Ingenieurgesellschaft mit beschränkter Haftung / Company with limited Liability
- Industry: Oil and gas
- Founded: 1972
- Founder: Kurt Thomas Pörner
- Headquarters: Vienna, Austria
- Key people: Andreas Pörner and Michael Volkmann
- Products: Plants for refinery, petrochemical, chemical, gas, pharmaceutical, power and environmental industries
- Services: Process engineering, industrial engineering, consulting, procurement/logistics, civil and structural engineerin; Contracting: Licensing, management, design, supply, construction, commissioning and start-up of complete process plants
- Number of employees: Over 500 employees
- Website: www.poerner.at/en.html

The Pörner Group is an Austrian technology orientated, engineering and contracting company working on projects for the process industry. The headquarters are situated in Vienna, Austria. The group of companies specialises in various engineering industries such as oil refineries, chemical plants, petrochemical plants, gas plants, power generation, industrial production and the pharmaceutical industry. The organization is made up of a network of several medium-sized companies in these industries.

The Pörner Group offers technologies to the world market and supplies complete process plants for: bitumen (Biturox), solvent deasphalting (SDA Plus), dewaxing and deoiling (Dewaxing / Deoiling), spray micronization (Micronization) as well as BTX aromatics extraction (Aromex) and formaldehyde and derivates. Climate-friendly technologies are also provided, such as: Bio-Silicates from rice hulls (Pörner Bio-Silicates), Pörner Bitumen Packing System and Power-to-X (PtX) and Fisch-Tropsch processes for PtX.

== History ==
The Pörner Group was founded by Kurt Thomas Pörner, Who began the Pörner Technical Bureau in 1972. The company grew from there, opening its first subsidiary in Linz in 1975. In the 1970s Pörner Ingenieurgesellschaft mbH, situated in Vienna, Austria, acquired the rights to license the Biturox® process for upgrading bitumen by means of selective air oxidation developed by the Austrian oil company OMV. Pörner licensed its first Biturox® plant to NIOC Isfahan in Iran.

In parallel with the rapid growth of the industry in Europe and worldwide, in the 1980s the Pörner Group expanded and realized several larger projects for refineries as well as for environmental facilities. In 1992 the Pörner Group opened its first foreign subsidiary in Grimma, Germany which specialises in process plants for the chemical industry. Shortly thereafter another Austrian subsidiary in Kundl, Tyrol was founded to supply the pharmaceutical industry, energy supply and industrial building services in the area.

In 2003 the Pörner group acquired 100% shares in EDL Anlagenbau Gesellschaft, a Leipzig, Germany based company. EDL specializes in refinery, chemical, petrochemical and gas sector clients. In 2019, EDL Anlagenbau Gesellschaft also signed a cooperation agreement for a study. This study, done in cooperation with the Rotterdam The Hague Innovation Airport aims to develop a demonstration plant that produces renewable jet fuel from air. It will use Climeworks’ direct air capture technology.

In 2005 the Pörner Bitumen Packing System was launched and earned the Pörner Group the Austrian State Prize for Consulting. The system allows bitumen to be packed and transported by alternative means, namely in cold state, rather than the traditional way of long distance bulk transportation (see Asphalt).

Gazintek was the next acquisition for the Pörner Group, with the company buying 70% of the shares in 2005 and the remainder in 2007. The company, rebranded to Pörner Kyiv in 2021, is mainly focused on providing detailed engineering services for the gas industry. Gazintek does business with European and Russian companies who have worldwide interests including Africa and Asia.

The Pörner group also has a subsidiary in Romania, focusing on engineering of process plants to service the refineries in the area.

In 2015 Pörner Ingenieurgesellschaft received the nomination of the State Award "Engineering Consulting 2015" for the project "Clean Air for Siberia: Planning a desulfurization plant for Norilsk Nickel". In the same year Pörner developed its own modern concept "Anlagenbau 4.0" for the best possible project realisation.

In 2016 Pörner granted its 50th Biturox® license worldwide. The bitumen oxidation technology Biturox® was licensed to HPCL-Mittal Energy Limited (HMEL) in India. In March 2016, OOO "Pörner Group Russia” has officially become an independent subsidiary of the Pörner Group in Moscow.

In 2018 Pörner opened a representative office in Burghausen, Germany.

On March 1, 2020, a new competence center ‘Pörner Water′ was created in the Vienna head office.

TAF Thermische Apparate Freiberg GmbH has been a member of the Pörner Group since 2011 and has been operating as a subsidiary of Pörner Ingenieurgesellschaft mbH since April 2022. The company specialises in gasification technologies and is a developer and supplier of special solutions in mechanical and plant engineering, especially for higher process temperatures and/or under higher process pressures.

In 2022 Pörner celebrated its 50th anniversary and their subsidiary, EDL celebrated its 30th anniversary in 2021.

== Subsidiaries ==
- Pörner Ingenieurgesellschaft Vienna (Austria)
- Pörner Linz (Austria)
- Pörner Kundl (Austria)
- EDL Leipzig (Germany)
- EDL Cologne (Germany)
- Pörner Grimma (Germany)
- Pörner Romania
- Pörner Kyiv(Ukraine)
- Pörner Burghausen (Germany)
- TAF Thermische Apparate Freiberg GmbH
