= Society for Cardiovascular Magnetic Resonance =

- Established: 1994
- Type: Non-profit professional medical society
- Headquarters: 1061 East Main Street, Suite 300, East Dundee, IL 60118; United States
- Key people: CEO - Chiara Bucciarelli-Ducci, MD, PhD
- Website: Official Website

The Society for Cardiovascular Magnetic Resonance (SCMR) is an international non-profit medical society based in East Dundee, in the United States. It was established as international representative and advocate for physicians, scientists, and technologists working in cardiovascular magnetic resonance (CMR) imaging. It works to improve patient outcomes through education, training, standards, research and development. The society has published more than 40 professional guidelines and expert consensus statements to help standardize and guide education, research and patient management with CMR. The society's members are physicians, scientists, technologists and trainees. In 2018, it is led by Matthias Stuber.

== History ==
The society was established in 1994. Its first president was Gerald M. Pohost, elected in 1996.

In 1998, the organization began holding annual scientific meetings. The meeting has grown to include a conference with about 1000 attendees. SCMR has organized joint scientific meetings with EACVI, as well as Joint Workshops with ISMRM.

== Working groups ==
The society has regional working groups and affiliates in Asia, Australia/New Zealand, Canada, Europe, India, Latin America, the Middle East, and the United States. The role of these working groups is to promote CMR in these regions. There are also special interest groups focusing on Pediatrics/Congenital and Interventional CMR.

The Canadian Society for Cardiovascular Magnetic Resonance, an independent chapter of SCMR, was established in 2005; in 2013 it published guidelines for the analysis and reporting of CMR studies.

== Organization ==
The SCMR is governed by its officers, including the president, vice-president, secretary, vice-secretary, past-president, and the board of trustees.

== Gold Medal Award ==
The Society presents an annual award, The Gold Medal Award, for distinguished and extraordinary service to the field of CMR and to the Society. Recipients have been:

Year	Awardee(s)
2011	Gerald M. Pohost, Charles B. Higgins.
2012	Dudley Pennell.
2013	Stefan Neubauer.
2014	Warren J. Manning.
2015	Christopher M. Kramer, Raymond J. Kim, Robert M. Judd.
2016	Joao A.C. Lima, Eike Nagel.
2017	Nathaniel Reicheck
2018	Andrew Arai
2019	Orlando Simonetti
2020	Peter Kellman, Jeanette Schulz-Menger
2021	Matthias Friedrich, Matthias Stuber
2022	James Moon, Robert R. Edelman
2023	Leon Axel, John Greenwood

== Publications ==
The society publishes an open access journal, the Journal of Cardiovascular Magnetic Resonance.

SCMR has worked with other cardiovascular societies (e.g. AHA, ACC, SCCT, ASE, ASNC) in establishing cardiovascular guidelines and appropriateness use criteria. These guidelines and consensus statements are based on published research studies and expert opinions in the field to help improve cardiovascular patient care. SCMR also joined the Choosing Wisely campaign in 2014 to reduce excessive testing.

The society also provides online introductory training in Cardiovascular Magnetic Resonance.
