= Orka náttúrunnar =

Icelandic power company

ON Power
- Industry: Energy
- Founded: 1 January 2014
- Headquarters: Reykjavík, Iceland
- Key people: Hildigunnur Thorsteinsson, chairman Berglind Rán Ólafsdóttir, CEO
- Products: Electricity, hot-water for space heating
- Owner: Reykjavik Energy
- Number of employees: 60
- Website: www.on.is

ON Power (Icelandic: Orka náttúrunnar [ˈɔr̥ka ˈnauhtuːrʏnːar̥]), is an Icelandic power company, headquartered in Reykjavík, that produces and sells electricity to industry and households by harnessing renewable, mainly geothermal, resources. ON Power also provides water for space heating in Reykjavík and surrounding areas. Traditionally, ON Power's main service area is Reykjavík and surrounding areas in the south-west part of Iceland, although households and businesses can buy electricity from any supplier in Iceland, regardless of location.

== History ==
ON Power was founded on 1 January 2014 as a subsidiary of Reykjavik Energy – which is owned by the city of Reykjavík and the municipalities of Akranes and Borgarnes. To comply with Icelandic law no. 65/2003 that effectively call for the de-regulation of the Icelandic electricity market, Reykjavik Energy moved its production and sales of electricity – including power plants – into the ON Power subsidiary.

== Power Plants ==
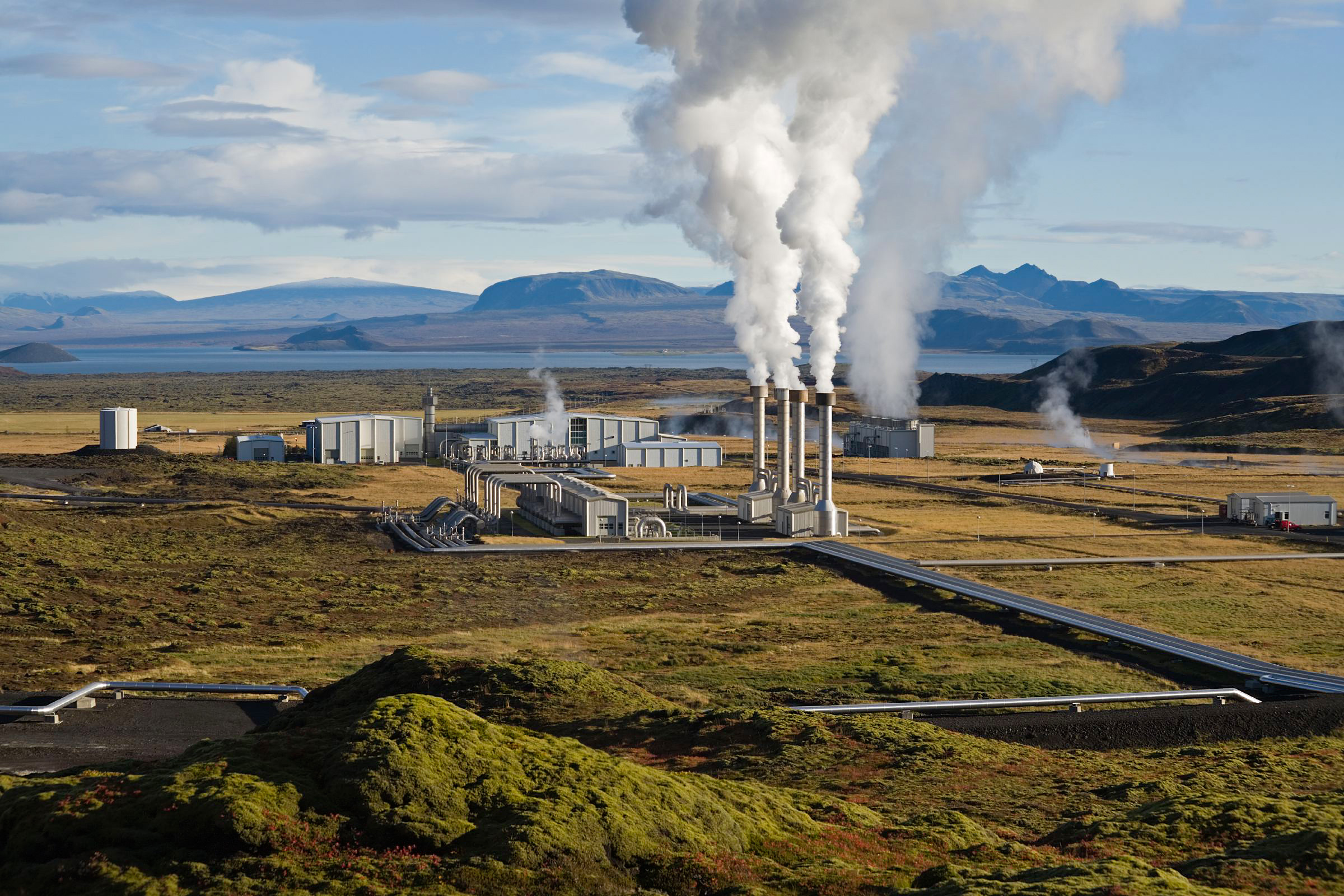
Nesjavellir Geothermal Plant

ON Power owns and operates the Nesjavellir and Hellisheiði Geothermal Plants. The plants provide electricity and hot water to industry and households in Iceland. 99% of housing in the Reykjavík area is space-heated with hot water provided by geothermal sources. Both plants are situated in the Hengill region; an active volcanic ridge in the south-west part of Iceland. ON also operates the Andakílsárvirkjun hydrostation, situated in Borgarfjörður.

The Nesjavellir Geothermal Plant has been operating since 1990 and the Hellisheiði Plant since 2006, with a combined output of 423 MWe and 433 MWth. The Andakílsárvirkjun has been operating since 1947 and has a total output of 8 MWe. The Elliðaár hydrostation – commissioned in 1921 – was operated by ON (and Reykjavik Energy prior to that) until 2013 when Icelandic laws 104/2001 declared the station, including machinery and pipelines, a historic preservation. As a result, the Elliðaár station was decommissioned.

== Fast-Charging Stations for Electric Cars ==
In March 2014, ON Power opened the first DC fast-charging stations for electric cars in Iceland. Electric cars that classified under the CHAdeMO and Type 2 CCS quick charging method can use the stations, free of charge(although pricing will begin in 2017). Most stations also have an AC 43kW Type 2 charger.

Since opening, the network has slowly expanded and now operates 16 fast charging stations. In December 2016, The Icelandic Ministry of Industry and Innovation allocated funding of 57.100.000kr over 3 years to ON in order to set up 14 individual 50kW DC fast charging stations around the country. ON plan to place chargers around the Ring Road with this funding. As a result, in May 2017 the company opened 3 additional chargers along Route 1 at Staðarskáli, Blönduós and Varmahlíð; completing the route between Reykjavík and Akureyri.

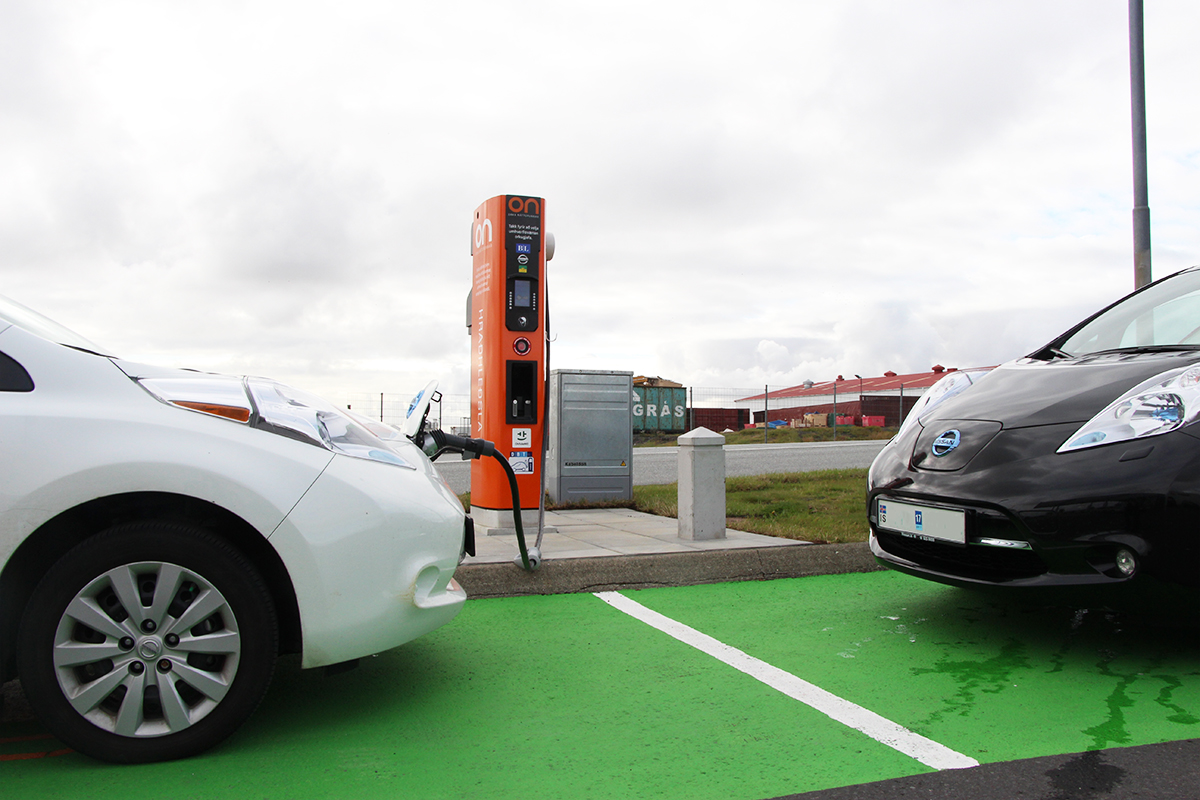
Fast-Charging Station at Selfoss

ON operates 16 chargers in the following locations:

- Reykjavík Area(x6)
- Reykjanesbær
- Hellisheiði Power Station
- Selfoss
- Akureyri(x2)
- Varmahlíð
- Blönduós
- Staðarskáli
- Borgarnes
- Akranes

== Emissions from Hellisheiði ==
With the geothermal plants situated at Hengill – an active volcanic area – emissions of H_{2}S (hydrogen sulfide) and CO_{2} (carbon dioxide) are released naturally from the area. Harnessing the geothermal resources has increased the concentration levels of those emissions with the expansion of the Hellisheiði Plant in recent years. ON Power has worked to reduce those emissions by injecting H_{2}S and CO_{2} back into the bedrock. The process dissolves H_{2}S in condensate water and injects it back into the high-temperature geothermal reservoir. Once injected, water-rock reactions taking place in the high-temperature geothermal reservoir will mineralize the H_{2}S. This method continues to be tested at industrial scale at the Hellisheiði Power Plant since early 2014.

== See also ==
- Electricity sector in Iceland
- Geothermal Energy
- Reykjavík
- Hellisheiði Geothermal Plant
- Nesjavellir Geothermal Plant
