= Climeworks =

Swiss company specializing in carbon dioxide air capture technology

Climeworks AG
- Company type: Aktiengesellschaft
- Industry: Direct air capture
- Founded: November 2009
- Headquarters: Zürich, Switzerland
- Website: https://climeworks.com

Climeworks AG is a Swiss company specializing in direct air capture and sequestration (DACCS) technology. The company's plants filter CO_{2} directly from the ambient air through an adsorption-desorption process that removes CO_{2} from the air permanently.

The company has more than 15 plants in operation in Europe, but is most well known for its large-scale plants in Iceland. Its two largest plants are called 'Orca' and 'Mammoth'.

== History and structure ==
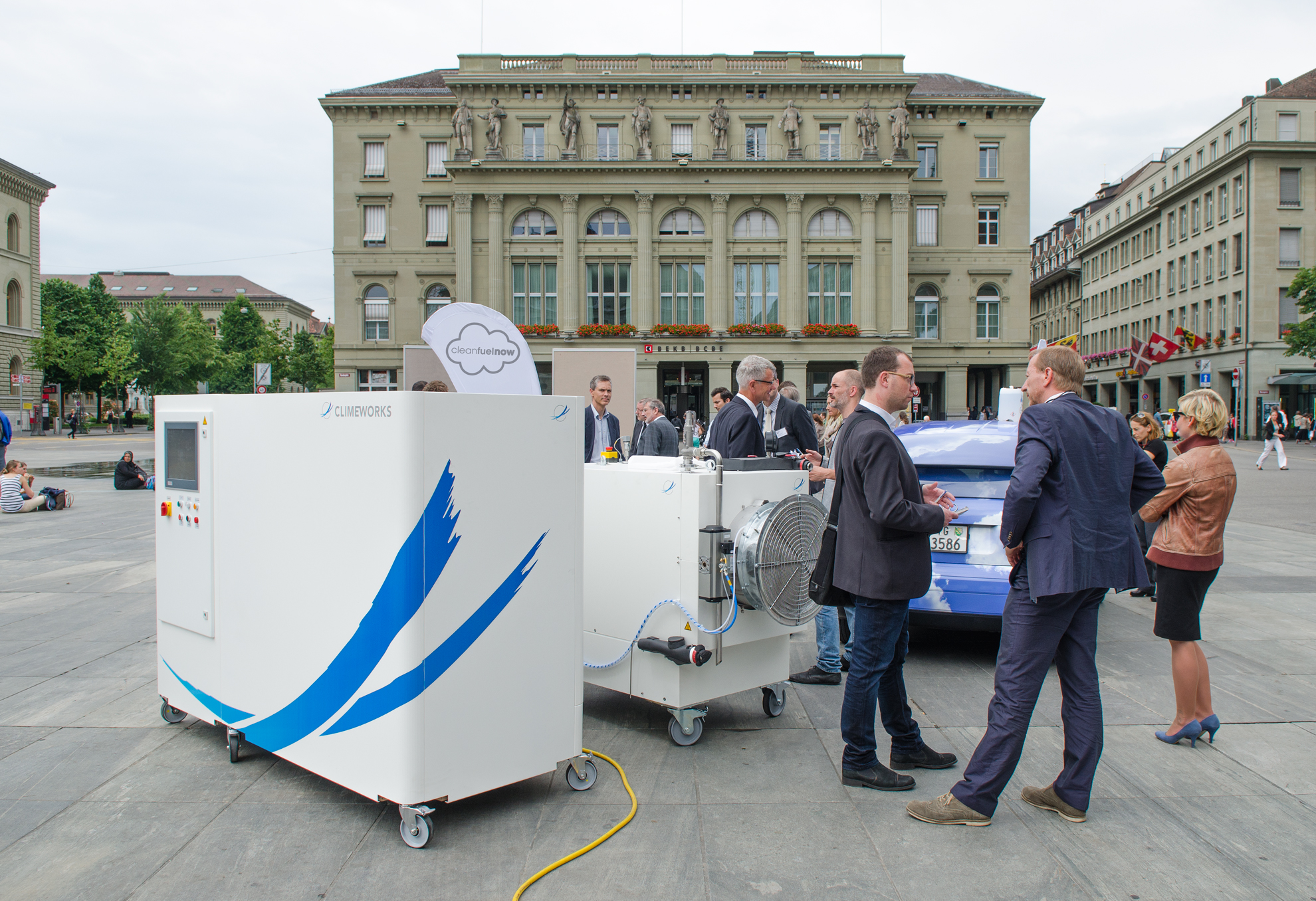
Climeworks equipment displayed in 2015 on Bundesplatz in Bern

Climeworks was founded in 2009 by the mechanical engineers Jan Wurzbacher and Christoph Gebald, who lead the company as co-CEOs. During their PhDs at the ETH Zurich, the two founders conducted research on direct air capture technology to remove carbon dioxide from the air. Based on that scientific research, Climeworks was founded as a spin-off from ETH Zurich.

In 2011, Climeworks received capital from investors for the first time to develop a prototype with a modular structure. The company was able to evolve its technology from laboratory to commercial scale, presenting the first concept of a modular CO_{2} collector and a working prototype in 2014.

The corporate offices of Climeworks AG are in Zürich and a German subsidiary Climeworks Deutschland GmbH opened in Cologne in 2019. As of January 2023, the company has over 300 employees internationally. In addition to its founders, Dr. Gebald and Wurzbacher, other board members include Dr. Ulf Berg, Dr. Martin Burkhardt, Syrie Crouch, Alfred Gantner and Dr. Maurits van Tol.

Its machines are powered by renewable energy or energy-from-waste, with a carbon dioxide re-emission rate of less than 10%.

=== Financing and research ===
During the company's development, a partnership was formed with the automaker Audi. Further support was provided by the Swiss Federal Office of Energy, which enabled the accelerated commercialization and scaling of the technology.

In 2018, Climeworks raised $30.8 million in a financing round and $110 million in 2020.

On 20 July 2021, the Swiss and Icelandic governments agreed to jointly develop “negative emission technologies” which involve extracting CO_{2} from the atmosphere and storing it underground using Climeworks and CarbFix (CO_{2}-to-stone) technologies.

In April 2022, Climeworks secured $650 million in an equity funding round, marking a significant fundraising achievement in the carbon dioxide removal industry. The funding round has classified Climeworks as a 'unicorn' startup, a term used for startups valued at over $1 billion.

Climeworks is also part of several European research and development projects, including production of synthetic fuels from CO_{2}.

== Major projects ==
In May 2017, the company opened a commercial direct air capture plant in Hinwil, Switzerland, designed to filter CO_{2} from ambient air. It consisted of 18 collector containers that together had a nominal capture capacity of 900 tons of CO_{2} per year. The plant was installed on the roof of a waste incineration facility that provided waste heat to power the machines. The CO_{2} that the plant captured was sold to a nearby greenhouse operator for use as fertilizer and to Coca-Cola HBC to produce the sparkling water Valser. The Hinwil facility stopped its operations in October 2022, as Climeworks pivoted from selling CO_{2} to storing the greenhouse gas permanently underground.

In October 2017, the demo project “CarbFix2” followed. As part of the Horizon 2020 research project, the CarbFix2 project at the Hellisheiði Power Station in Iceland filtered CO_{2} from the air with Climeworks technology, which was then stored underground in Iceland's basaltic rock, where it mineralizes.

In September 2021, Climeworks launched “Orca”, a large direct air capture and storage facility, with a nominal capture capacity of up to 4,000 tons of CO_{2} per year. Like the pilot project CarbFix2, the operating facility is located near the Hellisheiði Power Station, which provides geothermal energy to run the Orca plant, and the air-captured CO_{2} is stored underground by Climeworks’ storage partner Carbfix.

In May 2024, Climeworks launched "Mammoth", its largest direct air capture and storage facility to date. Located in Hellisheiði, Iceland, this plant is the 18th project undertaken by Climeworks and its second facility designed for commercial direct air capture and storage. Utilizing direct air capture (DAC) technology and Iceland's geothermal energy, Mammoth has the capacity to capture up to 36,000 tons of CO_{2} annually The CO_{2} captured at this facility is mineralized and stored underground in basalt formations through a collaboration with Carbfix.

=== Commercial services ===
Climeworks operates commercial direct air capture facilities and provides carbon dioxide removal services to both companies and individuals.

Several corporations have purchased Climeworks’ carbon dioxide removal, including Stripe, Microsoft, Swiss Re, and BCG. As of February 2023, the number of individuals who have subscribed to Climeworks’ carbon dioxide removal service exceeds 18,000.

In September 2024, Climeworks signed an agreement with British Airways to remove some of the airline's CO_{2} emissions.

In October 2024, Climeworks entered into a 40,000-tonne carbon dioxide removal purchase agreement with Morgan Stanley for an undisclosed price.

== Reception and certification ==
Climeworks was among Fast Company's "World's Most Innovative Companies of 2024." It has also been included in Time's 2024 list of influential companies.

Climeworks' carbon dioxide removal service received a 5/5-star rating in the CarbonPlan database.

In June 2021, Climeworks and DNV developed and validated a new methodology focusing on direct air capture, marking a step towards full third-party certification. In September 2022, Climeworks and Carbfix introduced a methodology dedicated to carbon dioxide removal through direct air capture and underground mineralization storage. This methodology has been validated by the certification body DNV.

== Criticism ==
In May 2025, Icelandic newspaper Heimildin analyzed Climeworks' most recent published data and found that, as of 2023, Climeworks' machines were capturing only a fraction of their supposed CO_{2} levels. This analysis showed that Climeworks was not yet offsetting the emissions resulting from its own operations.

== See also ==
- Carbon capture and storage
- Hellisheiði Power Station
- EDL Anlagenbau Gesellschaft

== Sources ==
- National Academies of Sciences, Engineering, and Medicine (2019). Negative Emissions Technologies and Reliable Sequestration: A Research Agenda. National Academies Press. doi:10.17226/25259. ISBN 978-0-309-48452-7. PMID 31120708. S2CID 134196575.
