= Center for Negative Carbon Emissions =

The Center for Negative Carbon Emissions (CNCE) is led by Director Matthew Green, and was founded by Klaus S. Lackner in the School of Sustainable Engineering and the Built Environment (SSEBE) at Arizona State University in 2014. CNCE is advancing carbon management technologies that can capture CO_{2} directly from ambient air in an outdoor operating environment. CNCE aims to demonstrate systems that over time increase in scope, reliability and efficiency while lowering the cost of carbon dioxide capture from air.
