= Chiara Bucciarelli-Ducci =

English cardiologist (born 1976)

- Born: 15 June 1976 (age 50)

Academic work
- Institutions: Royal Brompton and Harefield NHS Foundation Trust

Chiara Bucciarelli-Ducci (born 15 June 1976) is an Italian cardiologist working in England.

== Career ==
Bucciarelli-Ducci was born on 15 June 1976. She completed her general medical training and her specialist cardiology training at the Sapienza University in Rome, before taking on a doctorate at Imperial College London. Formerly a senior lecturer at the University of Bristol and co-director of the Clinical Research and Imaging Centre Bristol, she was named the chief executive officer of the Society for Cardiovascular Magnetic Resonance. As of September 2021, she works at the Royal Brompton and Harefield NHS Foundation Trust in London.
