= Klaus Lackner =

American geoengineer

Klaus S. Lackner
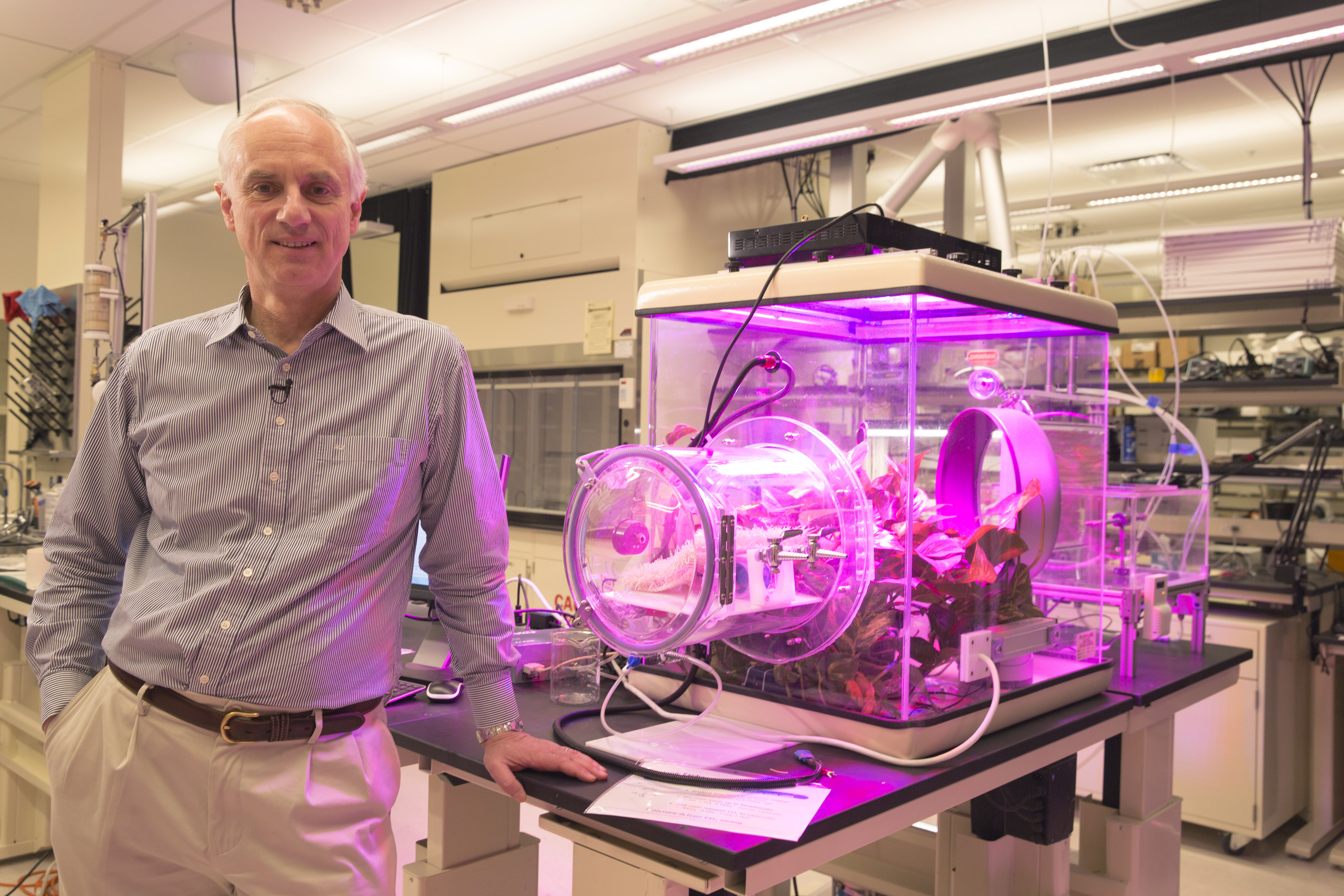
- Education: Heidelberg University (Ph.D. 1978, Diplom 1976)
- Known for: Carbon Dioxide Capture and Sequestration
- Scientific career
- Fields: Theoretical Physics, Environmental Engineering
- Workplaces: Los Alamos National Laboratory, Columbia University, Arizona State University, Carbon Collect Limited

Klaus S. Lackner is the Founding Director of the Center for Negative Carbon Emissions (CNCE) and a professor in School of Sustainable Engineering and the Built Environment at Arizona State University. He is scientific advisor to Carbon Collect Limited (name changed from Silicon Kingdom Holdings Limited in April 2021), and senior science advisor to Aircela Inc. He is a pioneer in carbon management and is the first to suggest capturing carbon dioxide from air in the context of addressing climate change.

His works include demonstrating and improving passive methods to remove carbon dioxide from the atmosphere, integrating air capture technology with applications for using carbon dioxide, exploring safe and permanent disposal options for carbon dioxide, and identifying opportunities for automation and scaling.As of 28 December 2019 his publications have been cited 12771 times and his h-index is 53.

Previously, he was the director of the Lenfest Center for Sustainable Energy at the Earth Institute. and Faculty in the Earth and Environmental Engineering department at Columbia University from 2001 to 2014. Along with CNCE executive director Allen Wright, he co-founded one of the first privately held air capture companies—Global Research Technologies (GRT)—in Tucson, Arizona where they demonstrated the moisture swing.

Prior to his academic work he held appointments at the theoretical division of Los Alamos National Laboratory for nearly 17 years.

His idea of the self-replicating machines along with his colleague, Christopher Wendt, was featured in 1995 by Discover Magazine as "One of the 7 Ideas that can Change the World."

He has also invented the Mechanical Tree which is designed to soak up passively the carbon dioxide from the air.

== Mechanical trees ==
Klaus designed the prototype Mechanical Tree (also referred to as a Synthetic Tree or Fake Tree,) which was on display at the 'Our Future Planet' temporary exhibition at the Science Museum, London from May 2021 until September 2022. The technology consists of sorbent tiles which cyclically are extended into the air and then retracted for regeneration. The sorbent tiles passively soak up the carbon dioxide from the air using 'passive direct air capture' (PDAC) technology and are claimed to be 1,000 times more efficient than natural trees that use photosynthesis. Subsequently, the carbon dioxide captured can be either sequestered in underground geological formations or sold for industrial use.

The PDAC and Mechanical Tree technology has been licensed to Carbon Collect Limited by CNCE.

== See also ==
Carbon Collect’s MechanicalTree™

== Articles ==
- "The Effect of Moisture on the Hydrolysis of Basic Salts". Chemistry: A European Journal. 22 (51): 18326–18330. Nov 2016. doi:10.1002/chem.201603701. PMID 27762459.
- "Capture CO2 from Ambient Air Using Nanoconfined Ion Hydration". Angewandte Chemie. 55 (12): 4026–4029. Feb 2016. doi:10.1002/anie.201507846. PMID 26914978.
- "The urgency of the development of CO2 capture from ambient air". Proceedings of the National Academy of Sciences of the United States of America. 109 (33): 13156–13162. June 2012. Bibcode:2012PNAS..10913156L. doi:10.1073/pnas.1108765109. PMC 3421162. PMID 22843674.
- "Washing carbon out of the air". Scientific American. 302 (6): 48–53. June 2010. Bibcode:2010SciAm.302f..66L. doi:10.1038/scientificamerican0610-66. PMID 20521482.
- "Capture of carbon dioxide from ambient air". European Physical Journal ST. 176 (1): 93–106. September 2009. Bibcode:2009EPJST.176...93L. doi:10.1140/epjst/e2009-01150-3. S2CID 8010722.
