= Carbon capture =

Carbon capture may refer to:

- Carbon capture and storage, in which carbon dioxide is captured at industrial facilities and power plants
- Direct air capture, where carbon dioxide is captured directly from air
