= Nesjavellir Geothermal Power Station =

Geothermal power station in Iceland

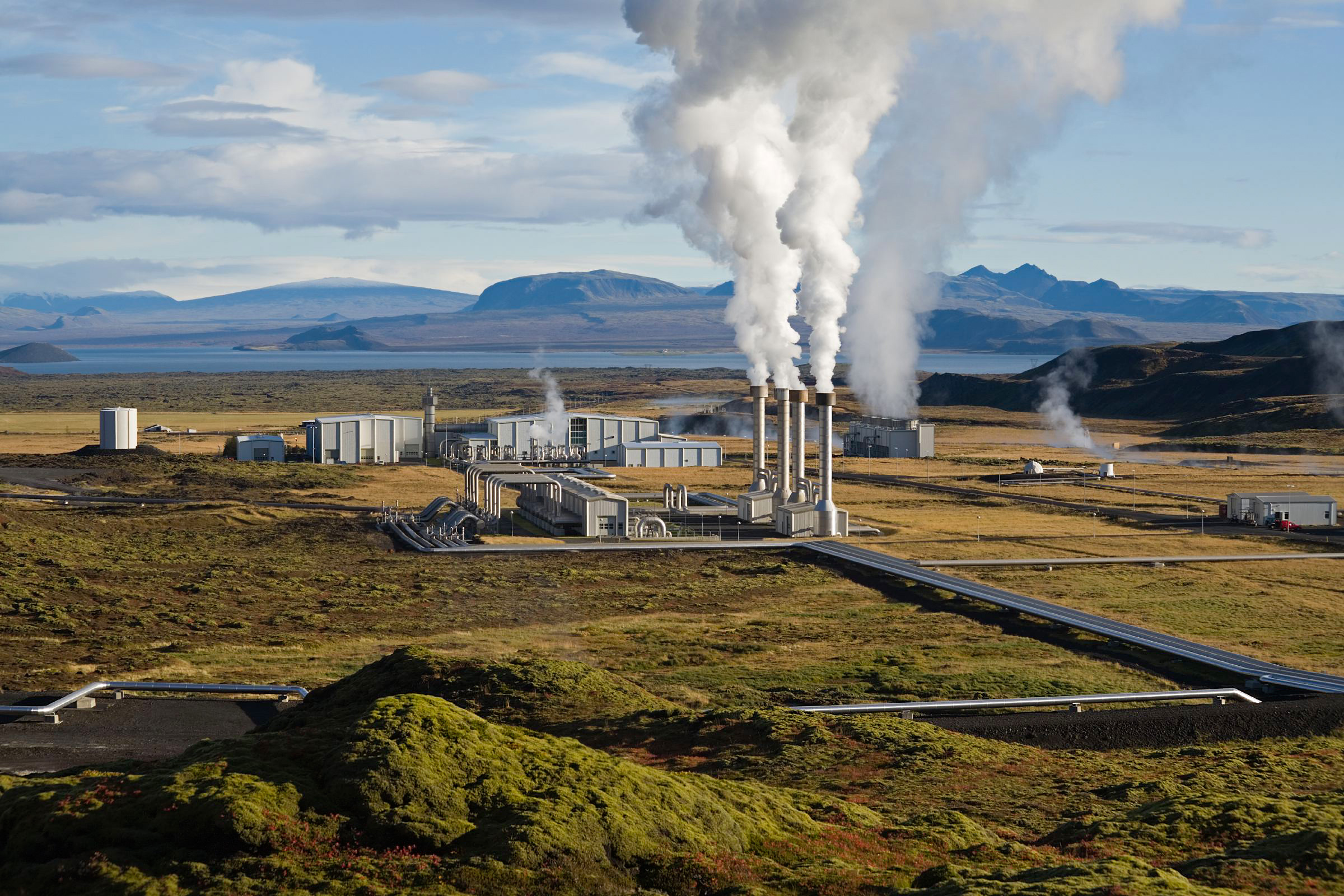
- Nesjavellir Geothermal Power Station
- Country: Iceland
- Location: Grímsnes- og Grafningshreppur
- Coordinates: 64°06′29″N 21°15′23″W
- Status: Operational
- Commission date: May 1990
- Owner: ON Power

Geothermal power station
- Type: Flash steam
- Min. source temp.: 190 °C (374 °F)
- Wells: 21 in use
- Max. well depth: 2,000 m (6,600 ft)
- Hot water output: 1,100 l/s
- Combined cycle?: Yes
- Cogeneration?: Yes
- Thermal capacity: 300 MWt

Power generation
- Units operational: 4 × 30MW
- Nameplate capacity: 120 MWe

External links
- Website: www.onpower.is/about-us
- Commons: Related media on Commons

The Nesjavellir Geothermal Power Station (Icelandic: Nesjavallavirkjun, Icelandic pronunciation: [ˈnɛːsjaˌvatlaˌvɪr̥cʏn]) is the second-largest geothermal power station in Iceland. The facility is located 177 m (581 ft) above sea level in the southwestern part of the country, near Þingvellir National Park and the Hengill mountain range, about 30 km east of central Reykjavík. The power station is owned and operated by ON Power.

Plans for utilizing the Nesjavellir [ˈnɛːsjaˌvɛtlɪr̥] area for geothermal power and water heating began in 1947, when boreholes were drilled to evaluate the area's potential for power generation. Research continued from 1965 to 1986. In 1987, construction of the plant began, and the cornerstone was laid in May 1990. The station produces approximately 120 MW of electrical power; it also delivers around 1,100 litres (290 US gal) of hot water 82–85 °C (180–185 °F) per second - with a heating capacity of 300 MWt, serving around half of the space heating and hot water needs of the Capital Region, the rest provided by lower temperature fields and the Hellisheiði Geothermal CHP plant.

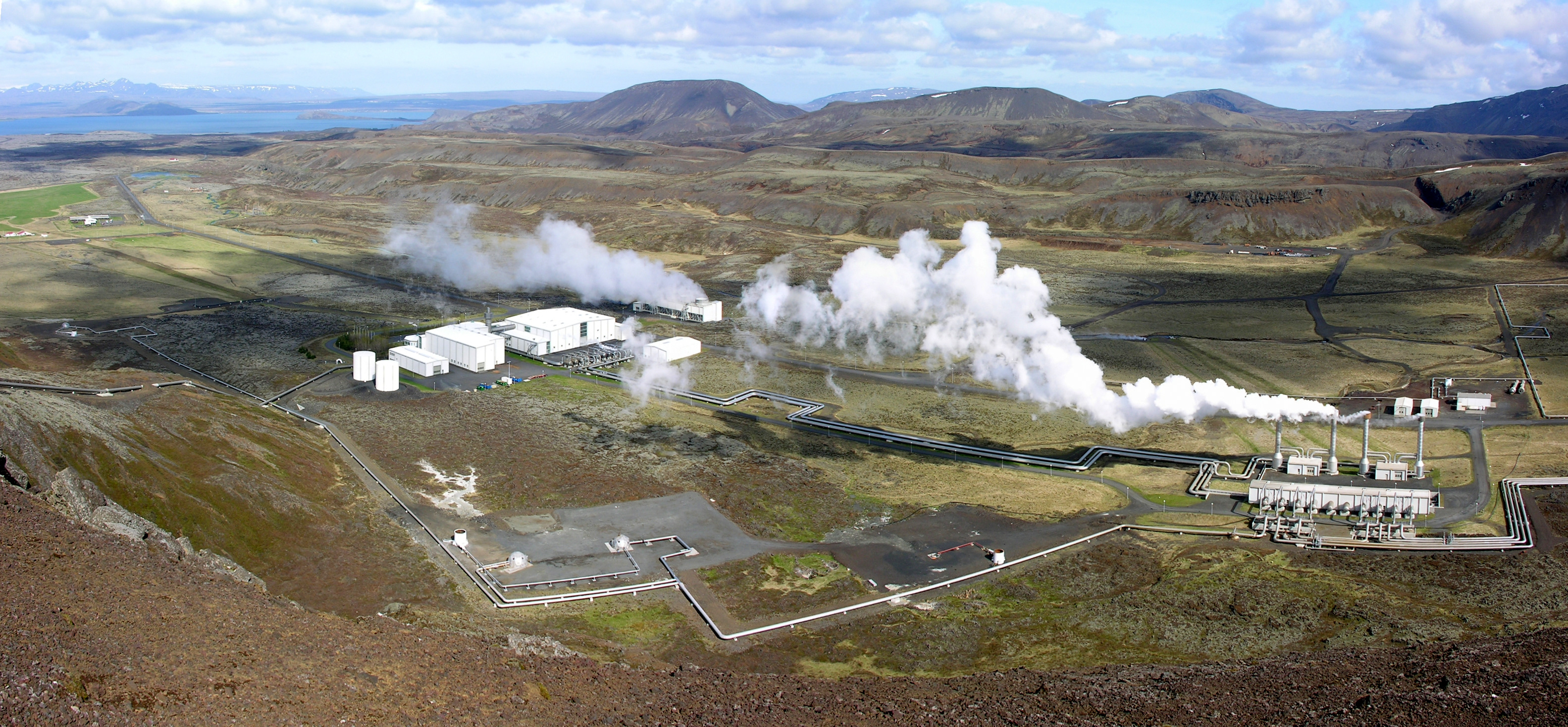
Panoramic view of the power station complex.

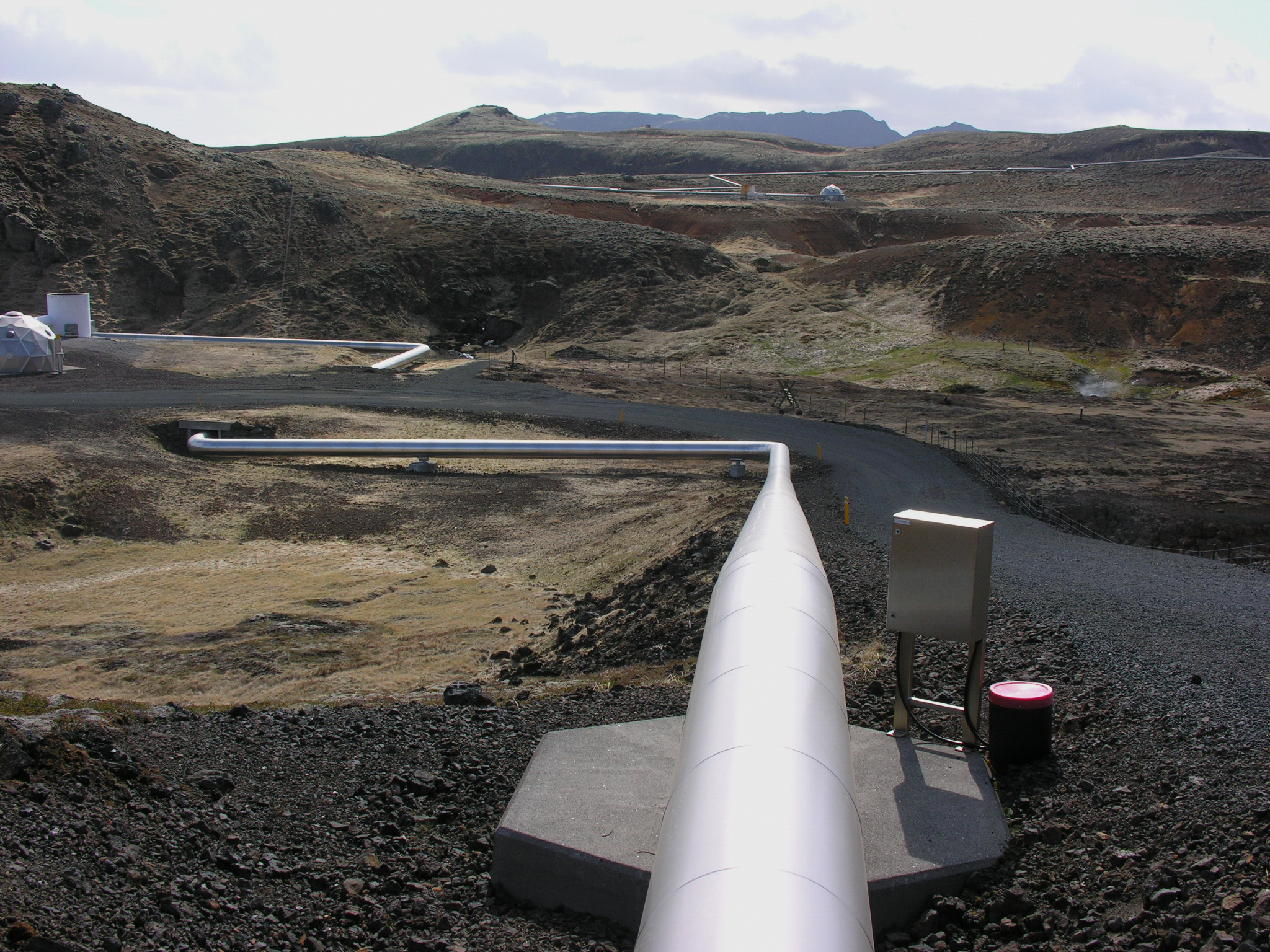
Penstocks at the power station complex.

== See also ==
- Geothermal electricity
- Geothermal power in Iceland
- List of largest power stations in the world
- Renewable energy in Iceland
