= Direct air capture =

Method of carbon capture from carbon dioxide in air

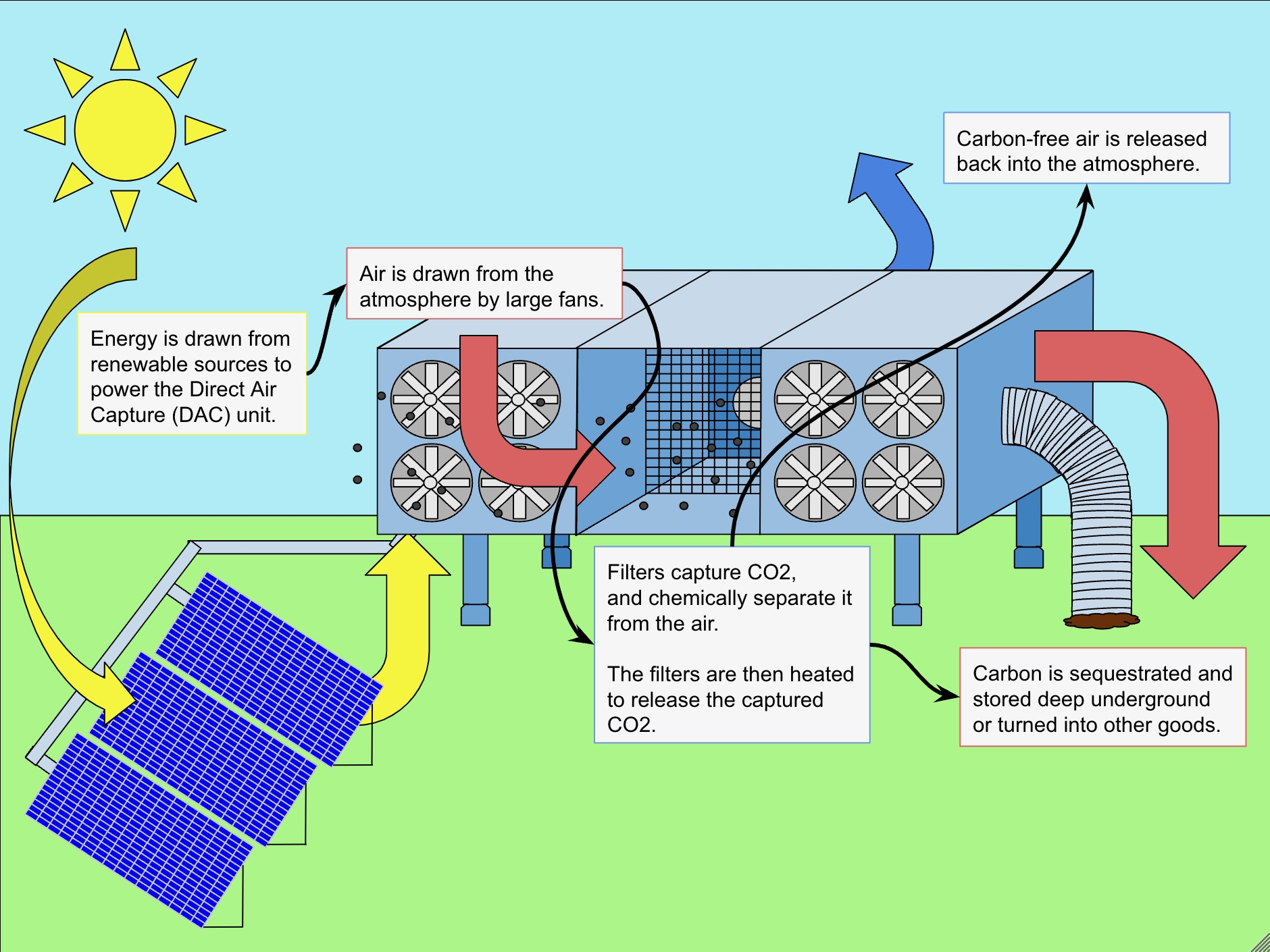
An example of what Direct Air Capture could look like and how the process works.

Direct air capture (DAC) is the use of chemical or physical processes to extract carbon dioxide (CO_{2}) directly from the ambient air. If the extracted CO_{2} is then sequestered in safe long-term storage, the overall process is called direct air carbon capture and sequestration (DACCS), achieving carbon dioxide removal. Systems that engage in such a process are referred to as negative emissions technologies (NET).

DAC is in contrast to carbon capture and storage (CCS), which captures CO_{2} from point sources, such as a cement factory or a bioenergy plant. After the capture, DAC generates a concentrated stream of CO_{2} for sequestration or utilization. Carbon dioxide removal is achieved when ambient air makes contact with chemical media, typically an aqueous alkaline solvent or sorbents. These chemical media are subsequently stripped of CO_{2} through the application of energy (namely heat), resulting in a CO_{2} stream that can undergo dehydration and compression, while simultaneously regenerating the chemical media for reuse.

DAC has yet to be integrated into emissions trading because, at over US$1000, the cost per ton of carbon dioxide is many times the carbon price. The current high cost of DAC is driven by the scale of deployment and energy factors. In 2025 DAC costs exceeded $1000 per tonne CO_{2}. Some claim that for plant scales of 1 Mtpa (million tonnes per annum) and above, DAC cost could be reduced below $200 per tonne of atmospheric CO_{2} removed, but others dispute this. Future innovations may reduce the energy intensity of this process.

DAC was suggested in 1999 and is still in development. Several commercial plants are planned or in operation in Europe and the US. Large-scale DAC deployment may be accelerated when connected with economical applications or policy incentives.

In contrast to carbon capture and storage (CCS) which captures emissions from a large point source such as a factory, DAC reduces the carbon dioxide concentration in the atmosphere as a whole. Flying across oceans and getting into space are expected to emit a significant amount of greenhouse gases in the mid-21st century. DAC can be used to capture carbon dioxide before or after its use in jet fuel. Although biofuels are an alternative to efuels, as of 2026 the most sustainable balance between them is unclear.

== Methods of capture ==
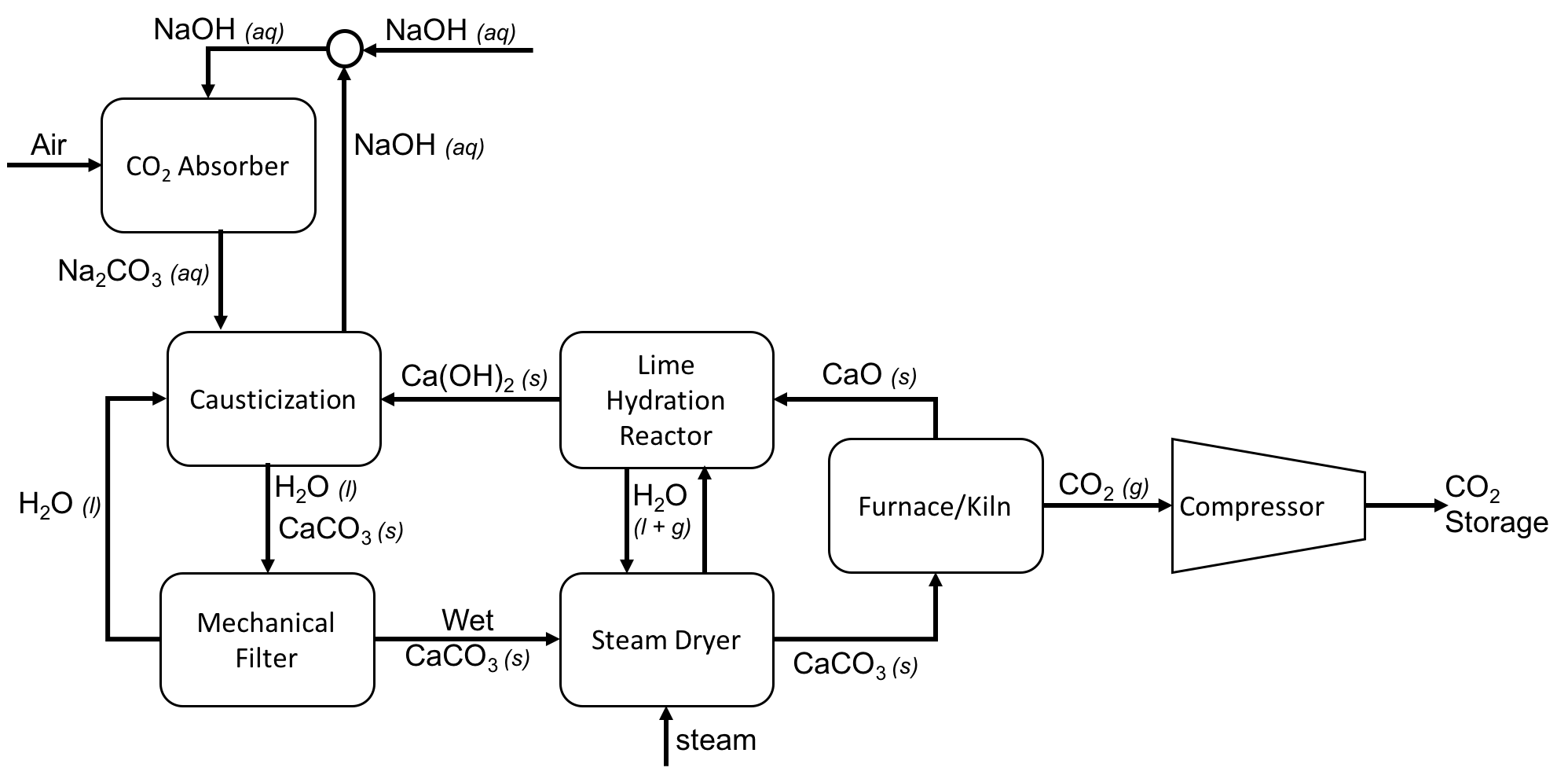
Flow diagram of direct air capture process using sodium hydroxide as the absorbent and including solvent regeneration

There are the three stages of CO_{2} capture in DAC: the contacting stage, the capture stage, and the separation stage. In the contacting stage, the DAC system transports atmospheric air containing CO_{2} to the equipment using large-scale fans. Subsequently, in the CO_{2} capture stage, CO_{2} rapidly and effectively binds with liquid solvents in chemical reactors or solid sorbents in filters, which must possess binding energies equivalent to that of CO_{2}. Later in the CO_{2} separation stage, external energy sources facilitate the separation of CO_{2} from the solvents or sorbents, yielding pure CO_{2} and regenerated solvents or sorbents. Following the completion of these three stages, the separated pure CO_{2} is either utilized or stored, while the recovered solvents or sorbents are recycled for reuse in the CO_{2} capture process.

Since CO_{2} in the atmosphere is only at approximately 0.04%, the process of capturing CO_{2} from the air presents a great challenge in kinetics and thermodynamics. Generally, solid sorbents DAC (S-DAC) uses low temperature process DAC, while liquid (amine or metallic hydroxides) sorbents DAC (L-DAC) uses low or high temperature process. S-DAC and L-DAC feature different properties in terms of kinetics and heat transfers. Currently, L-DAC and S-DAC represent two mature technologies for industrial deployment. Additionally, several emerging DAC technologies, including electro-swing adsorption (ESA), moisture-swing adsorption (MSA), and membrane-based DAC (m-DAC), are in different stages of development, testing, or limited practical application.

More recently, Ireland-based company Carbon Collect Limited has developed the MechanicalTree™ which simply stands in the wind to capture CO_{2}. The company claims this 'passive capture' of CO_{2} significantly reduces the energy cost of Direct Air Capture, and that its geometry lends itself to scaling for gigaton CO_{2} capture.

Most commercial techniques use a liquid solvent—usually amine-based or caustic—to absorb CO_{2} from a gas. For example, a common caustic solvent: sodium hydroxide reacts with CO_{2} and precipitates a stable sodium carbonate. This carbonate is heated to produce a highly pure gaseous CO_{2} stream. Sodium hydroxide can be recycled from sodium carbonate in a process of causticizing. Alternatively, the CO_{2} binds to solid sorbent in the process of chemisorption. Through heat and vacuum, the CO_{2} is then desorbed from the solid.

Among the specific chemical processes that are being explored, three stand out: causticization with alkali and alkali-earth hydroxides, carbonation, and organic−inorganic hybrid sorbents consisting of amines supported in porous adsorbents.

=== Other explored methods ===
The idea of using many small dispersed DAC scrubbers—analogous to live plants—to create environmentally significant reduction in CO_{2} levels, has earned the technology a name of artificial trees in popular media.

==== Moisture swing sorbent ====
In a cyclical process designed in 2012 by professor Klaus Lackner, the director of the Center for Negative Carbon Emissions (CNCE), dilute CO_{2} can be efficiently separated using an anionic exchange polymer resin called Marathon MSA, which absorbs air CO_{2} when dry, and releases it when exposed to moisture. A large part of the energy for the process is supplied by the latent heat of phase change of water. The technology requires further research to determine its cost-effectiveness.

==== Metal-organic frameworks ====
Other substances which can be used are metal–organic frameworks (MOFs).

Metal–organic frameworks are crystalline porous materials composed of metal ion clusters linked by organic molecules, resulting in highly ordered three-dimensional structures with exceptionally large internal surface areas. Compared to conventional solid sorbents such as activated carbons and zeolites, MOFs offer greater tunability: their pore size, geometry, and surface chemistry can be systematically varied by changing the metal centers or organic linkers, enabling materials to be designed with specific CO₂ binding properties. For DAC applications, amine-functionalized MOFs have attracted particular interest, as the amine groups can selectively bind CO₂ through chemisorption even at the extremely low atmospheric concentration of approximately 400 ppm. A key challenge for MOFs in DAC is moisture stability: since atmospheric air always contains water vapor at concentrations far exceeding CO₂, water molecules compete for the same binding sites and can cause structural degradation of the framework over repeated adsorption–desorption cycles. Engineering MOFs that are both selective for CO₂ and resistant to humidity under real-world operating conditions remains an active area of research.

Identifying effective MOF sorbents for DAC is challenging due to the vast number of possible framework combinations. In 2023, researchers from Meta AI's Fundamental AI Research (FAIR) team and Georgia Institute of Technology released the Open Direct Air Capture (OpenDAC) dataset to address this problem computationally. The dataset contains results from approximately 400 million CPU hours of quantum chemistry calculations screening MOF candidates for CO₂ adsorption properties, making it one of the largest open computational datasets in the field. Alongside the dataset, machine learning interatomic potential models were released to enable rapid screening of candidate materials at a fraction of the cost of traditional density functional theory simulations, with the goal of accelerating the discovery of viable DAC sorbents.

==== Membranes ====
Membrane-based separation (m-DAC) employs semi-permeable membranes. This method requires little water and has a smaller footprint. Typically polymeric membranes, either glassy or rubbery, are used for direct air capture. Glassy membranes typically exhibit high selectivity with respect to carbon dioxide; however, they also have low permeabilities. Membrane capture of carbon dioxide is still in development and needs further research before it can be implemented on a larger scale.

==== Electro-Swing Adsorption ====
Electro-swing adsorption (ESA) has also been proposed.

==== Rock flour ====
Rock flour, soil ground into nanoparticles by glacier ice, has potential both as a soil conditioner and for carbon capture. Glacier melting deposits one billion tons of rock flour annually, and one ton of Greenlandic rock flour can capture 250 kilograms (550 lb) of carbon.

== Environmental impact ==
DAC is a carbon negative technology, with its greenhouse gas emissions (GHG) estimated to range from 0.01 tCO_{2} emitted per tCO_{2} captured when renewable electricity is used to 0.65 tCO_{2} emitted per tCO_{2} captured when grid electricity and natural gas (NG) heating are used. The energy source emission factor of DAC is the primary driver of DAC's GHG emissions. The combination of renewable wind and grid electricity would also be carbon negative, providing high carbon removal benefits. The emissions factors for renewable wind and grid electricity are typically less than 0.1 tCO_{2} emitted per tCO_{2} captured if the wind plant supplies at least 50–80% of the plant capacity factor (capacity usage) when grid electricity emission factors do not exceed 0.3077 kgCO_{2}/kWh. Higher grid electricity emission factors could still be used, but this would require their use to be less than 20% to achieve very high carbon removal.

Proponents of DAC argue that it is an essential component of climate change mitigation. Researchers posit that DAC could help contribute to the goals of the Paris Agreement (namely limiting the increase in global average temperature to well below 2 °C above pre-industrial levels). The IEA estimates that capture of at least 85 million tonnes and 980 million tonnes of CO_{2} annually by 2030 and 2050, respectively, are needed to achieve net zero. However, others claim that relying on this technology is risky and might postpone emission reduction under the notion that it will be possible to fix the problem later, and suggest that reducing emissions may be a better solution. It is important to see DAC as a complementary solution that is necessary in helping to achieve climate targets.

Opponents of DAC argue that the resources required to operate DAC technologies, are an immense burden that may outweigh the goal of the technology itself. A 2020 analysis revealed that DAC 2 technology may be an unsuitable option to capture the projected 30 Gt-CO_{2} per year as it requires an enormous amount of materials (16.3–27.8 Gt of NH_{3} and 3.3–5.6 Gt of EO) The same study found that DAC 1 technology requires at least 8.4–13.1 TW-yr (46–71% TGES), an estimate that was calculated with the exclusion of the associated energy costs for carbon storage. However, the IEA net zero approaches require CO_{2} capture from DAC in the magnitude of 0.1 Gt-CO_{2} (980 million tonnes of CO_{2}) annually in 2050, which is significantly lower than 30 Gt-CO_{2} per year that opponents of DAC were assessing.

Energy cost concerns were explored in 2021 and found that in order for DAC technology to maintain a carbon removal of 73-86% per ton of CO_{2} captured, DAC would demand land occupation and renewable energy equivalent to what is needed for a global switch from gasoline to electric vehicles, with approximately five times higher material consumption. However, the material demand of DAC is mostly from common materials, such as steel, concrete and earth minerals (like zeolites and metallic hydroxides). The use of electric vehicle may require substantial accessibility to critical materials, and this limited availability of critical materials may not be able to sustain the demand needed for net zero.

Some DAC technologies, especially liquid systems, require both high temperature heat and electricity. In these systems the electrical demand is made using natural gas, imported electricity from the grid, and oxyfuel combustion of natural gas. This means that many DAC technologies are powered by fossil fuels, the very thing the technology is meant to eliminate reliance on. However, from GHG emissions standpoint, DAC would generally be carbon-negative even if natural gas was used for heating, with emission factors of 0.3–0.65 tCO_{2} emitted per tCO_{2} captured. Thus, the aim of DAC of offsetting emissions could still be achieved.

DAC relying on amine-based absorption demands significant water input. It was estimated, that to capture 3.3 gigatonnes of CO_{2} a year would require 300 km^{3} of water, or 4% of the water used for irrigation. On the other hand, using sodium hydroxide needs far less water, but the substance itself is highly caustic and dangerous. Additionally, different carbon removal technologies could have their design and operational advantages, for example, while nature-based solutions are cheap, DAC plant that captures 1 MtCO_{2} per year using a land area of 0.4–1.5 km^{2} (99–371 acres) is equivalent to the CO_{2} capture rates of roughly 46 million trees, requiring approximately 3,098–4,647 km^{2} (766,000–1,148,000 acres) of land.

DAC also requires higher energy input in comparison to traditional capture from point sources, like flue gas, due to the low concentration of CO_{2}. Some authors give the theoretical minimum energy required to extract CO_{2} from ambient air as 250 kWh per tonne of CO_{2}, while capture from natural gas and coal power plants requires, respectively, about 100 and 65 kWh per tonne of CO_{2}. The additional penalty from the use of fans to pump air could add a 10% to 30% energy penalty if DAC energy demand is 10 to 4 MJ/tCO_{2}, respectively.

== Applications ==
Practical applications of DAC include

- enhanced oil recovery,
- production of carbon-neutral synthetic fuel and plastics,
- beverage carbonation,
- carbon sequestration,
- improving concrete strength,
- creating carbon-neutral concrete alternative,
- enhancing productivity of algae farms,
- enrichment of air in greenhouses
- liquid fuels
- enhanced coal bed methane

These applications require different concentrations of CO_{2} product formed from the captured gas. Forms of carbon sequestration such as geological storage require pure CO_{2} products (concentration > 99%), while other applications such as agriculture can function with more dilute products (~ 5%). Since the air that is processed through DAC originally contains 0.04% CO_{2} (or 400 ppm), creating a pure product requires more energy than a dilute product and is thus typically more expensive. Capture carbon that is used for food typically requires CO_{2} with higher purity, ranging from 50+% followed by additional chemical processing.

DAC is not an alternative to traditional, point-source carbon capture and storage (CCS), rather it is a complementary technology that could be utilized to manage carbon emissions from distributed sources, fugitive emissions from the CCS network, and leakage from geological formations. Because DAC can be deployed far from the source of pollution, synthetic fuel produced with this method can use already existing fuel transport infrastructure.

Typical discourse surrounding DAC is relegated to its effectiveness at mitigating climate change/global warming issues. However, the majority of existing DAC facilities are small scale, And operate primarily to sell the captured CO_{2} for use in other products rather than permanently sequestering it. DAC facilities that sell CO_{2} for beverage production operate with low recovery rates of around 4.7% and produces 58-tCO2 per day. The use of DAC facilities for commercial purposes, reemphasizes the opinion of naysayers, that DAC is a ploy used by corporations to protect and promote financial interest.

Given the myriad of DAC applications, proponents of DAC argue that the political utility of the technology lies in its ability to create new employment opportunities.

== Operational/developing DAC facilities ==
DAC Projects and their respective processes for carbon removal and/or storage

Company, project	Process technology
Antecy, Carbon from Air (CAIR™)	Solid carbonate sorbent, temperature swing
Carbon Capture™	Zeolite molecular sieves, temperature-vacuum swing
Carbon Collect, MechanicalTrees™ for Passive Direct Air Capture (PDAC™)	Solid ion-exchange resin tiles, moisture swing
Carbon Engineering & Greyrock Energy, AIR TO FUELS™, Direct Fuel Production™, GreyCat™	Carbon Engineering DAC with Fischer–Tropsch catalysis
Carbon Engineering & Storegga Geotechnologies	Carbon Engineering DAC with geological storage
Carbon Engineering & 1PointFive (Oxy Low Carbon Ventures & Rusheen Capital Management)	Carbon Engineering DAC licensed to 1PointFive with EOR and geological storage
Carbyon	Thin-film sorbent on porous membrane, temperature swing
Climeworks in partnership with Northern Lights	Climeworks DAC with geological storage
Climeworks in partnership with Carbfix, Orca	Climeworks DAC with geological storage
CO2Circulair	Membrane gas absorption with liquid absorbent and concentration by membrane electrolysis
DACCITY	Surface-activated porous carbon composite ceramic monoliths
Global Algae	DAC and flue gas capture with algae production
Highly Innovative Fuels	DAC with water electrolysis and fuel synthesis
Hydrocell	Solid amine sorbent for indoor air quality control
Mission Zero Technologies	DRIVE: Direct Removal (of CO2) via Innovative Valorisation using Emissions
Mosaic Materials	Metal–organic framework sorbents for indoor air quality control
Nordic Electrofuel	Climeworks and Sunfire technologies for synfuel production
Noya	Retrofit of building cooling towers with "non-toxic CO2-absorbing chemical blend"
Origen Power	Lime-based sorbents with solid oxide fuel cell and oxy-fired calcination
Rolls-Royce	Small modular nuclear reactors to power DAC and fuel synthesis (aviation fuel)
Skytree	Derived from International Space Station air scrubber technology, deployed in electric vehicles
Solarbelt FairFuel gGmbH	DAC and biogas with co-electrolysis for syngas production and fuel synthesis (aviation fuel)
Soletair Power	DAC integrated with buildings' HVAC systems to reduce net CO_{2} emissions from infrastructures
Sunfire	DAC with co-electrolysis for syngas production and fuel synthesis
Sustaera	Solid alkali metal sorbent on ceramic monoliths
Verdox	Solid quinone sorbent, electro-swing adsorption
Zenid Fuel	Climeworks DAC with co-electrolysis for syngas production and fuel synthesis (aviation fuel)

=== International DAC development ===
- 53 DAC plants are expected to be operational by the end of 2024
- 93 DAC plants to be operating in 2030 with a combined capacity of 6.4-11.4 MtCO2/yr
- By the end of 2024, 18 plants are scheduled to be operational in North America and 24 in Europe
- The leading countries in DAC include the US, Canada and European nations

==== China ====
DAC technologies have been proposed to help China in its pursuit for carbon neutrality by 2060. Following the 2021 Glasgow Climate Conference, as the leading GHG emitter, China has begun the development of various low-emission strategies. With China's commitment to DAC alone, global warming could decrease by approximately 0.2 °C–0.3 °C. Recent studies on deep decarbonization in China suggest that carbon neutrality can be attained with contribution from carbon capture and storage to dispose of multiple GtCO2 yr-1 point-source emissions. China has developed its own direct air capture (DAC) technology, called "CarbonBox," developed by Shanghai Jiao Tong University and China Energy Engineering Corporation. Each module can extract over 100 tonnes of carbon dioxide (CO_{2}) annually, resulting in a 99% pure CO_{2} product. CarbonBox DAC facilities are the size of a shipping container, can be installed on site and utilize low-carbon energy sources to remove CO_{2} from the atmosphere.

==== Iceland ====
The Orca, pioneered by Zurich-based Climeworks with support from Microsoft in 2021, was the first large-scale DAC plant, claimed to be able to remove 4000 tons of CO_{2} annually this amount corresponds to approximately 1.75 million liters of gasoline. Howvever the actual performance has averaged 600 tonnes per year since it started operating, and fails to even extract sufficient CO_{2} to compensate for its own emissions. The DAC facility is located in Iceland, Hellisheidi, and is powered by the Hellisheidi Geothermal Power Plant. Orca consists of 12 amine-holding containers that collect a total of around 600 kg of CO_{2} per hour. This facility operates in conjunction with CarbFix, an Icelandic technology firm. CarbFix takes the captured CO_{2} from the DAC facility and injects the CO_{2} into the Earth's crust (through mineralization) The mineralization process circumvents risks of fire and leaks, that are associated with alternative DAC technologies.

==== Kenya ====
Octavia Carbon, founded by Martin Freimüller in 2022, is the first Direct Air Capture Company in the Global South. The company plans to develop DAC technology in alignment with the country's renewable grid and rich geology, both of which are suitable for CO_{2} storage. This project is still in its development phase, however, following support from the Kenyan government and international DAC companies, the team has swelled to employ 53+ individuals. In collaboration with Carbonfuture, Octavia Carbon now seeks to implement a breakthrough digital Monitoring, Reporting, and Verification (dMRV) system for DAC. dMRV systems allow real-time data tracking across the entire carbon removal process. The current DAC pilot facility, Project Hummingbird, is located in Kenya's Rift Valley in Naivasha and is projected to capture and securely store 1000 tons of CO_{2} annually (1000tCO/yr). Project Hummingbird will utilize the mineralization process by injecting the stored CO_{2} into the basalt rock formations native to the Rift Valley

== Cost ==
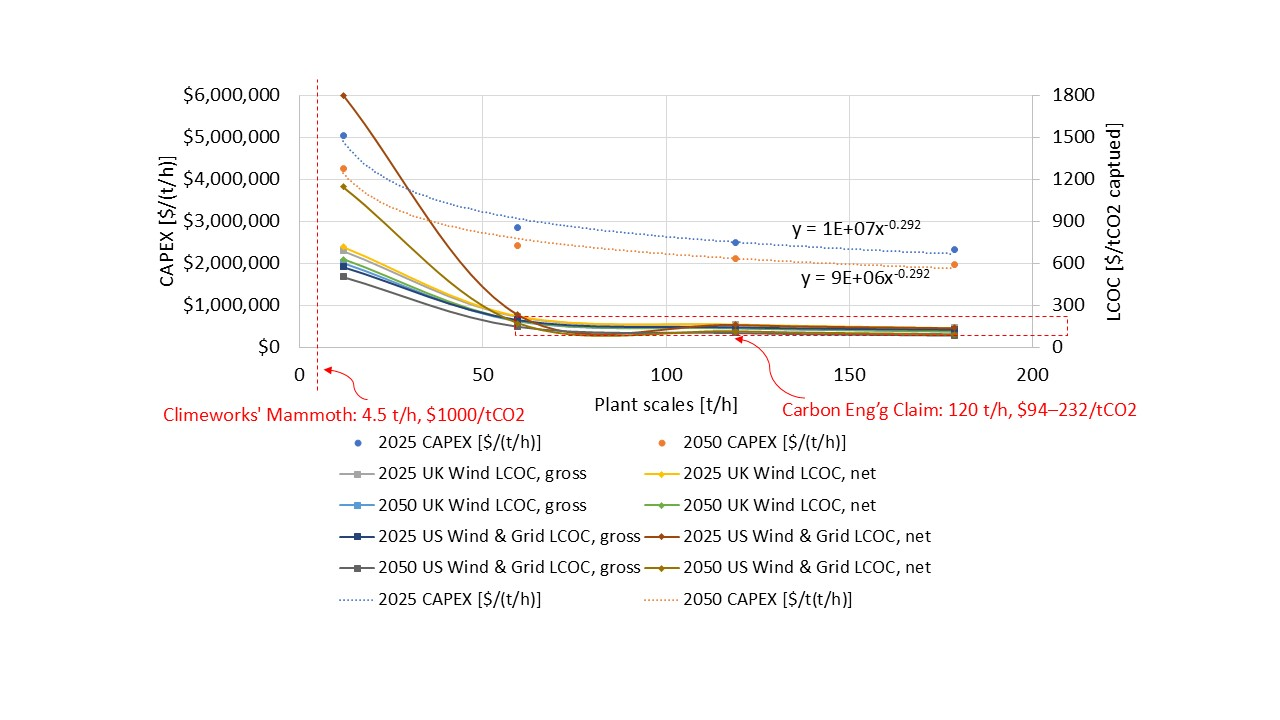
The impact of plant capacity on key solid sorbent direct air capture technologies

One of the largest hurdles to implementing DAC is the cost of separating CO_{2} from air. In 2023, the United States Department of Energy was aiming for costs per tonne to be under $100. The current largest DAC plant, Climeworks Mammoth, has a capacity of just 36,000 tonnes CO_{2} per annum with a capture cost of $1,000 (£774) per tCO_{2}. A 2025 investigation indicated that this high cost is due to the plant capacity in operation, typically less than 50,000 tonnes per annum. Increasing the capacity of DAC plants can lead to the benefits of economies of scale, with cost ranging from $94–232 per tCO_{2} captured for a 1 Mtpa plant. Large-scale DAC deployment can be accelerated by policy incentives.

Under the Bipartisan Infrastructure Law, the U.S. Department of Energy will invest $3.5 billion in four direct air capture hubs. According to the agency, the hubs have the potential to capture at least 1 million metric tonnes of carbon dioxide (CO_{2}) annually from the atmosphere. Once captured, the CO_{2} will be permanently stored in a geologic formation.

The Department of Energy invested $1.2 billion to further developments of direct air capture facilities in Texas and Louisiana. These projects are the result of initial selections from President Biden's Bipartisan Infrastructure Law.

== Development ==
=== Deep Sky ===
Deep Sky signed a 10-year offtake agreement with TD Bank in June 2026 for more than 18,000 verified direct air capture carbon-removal credits.

=== Carbon engineering ===
Carbon Engineering is a commercial DAC company founded in 2009 and backed, among others, by Bill Gates and Murray Edwards. As of 2018, it runs a pilot plant in British Columbia, Canada, that has been in use since 2015 and is able to extract about a tonne of CO_{2} a day. An economic study of its pilot plant conducted from 2015 to 2018 estimated the cost at $94–232 per tonne of atmospheric CO_{2} removed. A publication in 2025 agreed with the cost estimates by Carbon Engineering, under the conditions that the DAC plant capacity would be at least 1 Mtpa to achieve capture costs of $97–168/gross tCO_{2} captured [$126–170/net tCO_{2} captured] in 2025 and $87–140/gross tCO_{2} captured [$93–142/net tCO_{2} captured] in 2050. Furthermore, this study also agreed with Climeworks estimates of more than $1000/tCO_{2} captured if the DAC plant capacity is less than 0.05 Mtpa (50,000 tonnes annually). The current largest DAC plant, Climeworks Mammoth is just 36,000 tonnes per annum.

Partnering with California energy company Greyrock, Carbon Engineering converts a portion of its concentrated CO_{2} into synthetic fuel, including gasoline, diesel, and jet fuel.

The company uses a potassium hydroxide solution. It reacts with CO_{2} to form potassium carbonate, which removes a certain amount of CO_{2} from the air.

=== Climeworks ===
Climeworks's first industrial-scale DAC plant, which started operation in May 2017 in Hinwil, in the canton of Zurich, Switzerland, can capture 900 tonnes of CO_{2} per year. To lower its energy requirements, the plant uses heat from a local waste incineration plant. The CO_{2} is used to increase vegetable yields in a nearby greenhouse.

The company stated that it costs around $600 to capture one tonne of CO_{2} from the air.

Climeworks partnered with Reykjavik Energy in Carbfix, a project launched in 2007. In 2017, the CarbFix2 project was started and received funding from European Union's Horizon 2020 research program. The CarbFix2 pilot plant project runs alongside a geothermal power plant in Hellisheidi, Iceland. In this approach, CO_{2} is injected 700 meters under the ground and mineralizes into basaltic bedrock forming carbonate minerals. The DAC plant uses low-grade waste heat from the plant, effectively eliminating more CO_{2} than they both produce.

On May 8, 2024, Climeworks activated the world's largest DAC plant named Mammoth in Iceland. It will be able to pull 36,000 tons of carbon from the atmosphere a year at full capacity, according to Climeworks, equivalent to taking around 7,800 gas-powered cars off the road for a year. This plant is reported to capture CO_{2} at a cost of $1,000 (£774) per tCO_{2}. This high cost is primarily due to the size of the plant as product cost generally decreases with economy of scale. It is reported that for a 1 Mtpa CO_{2} plant, DAC cost would generally be within $94–232 per tonne of atmospheric CO_{2} removed. Project Cypress aims for over 1 Mtpa in the US.

=== Global thermostat ===
Global Thermostat is private company founded in 2010, located in Manhattan, New York, with a plant in Huntsville, Alabama. Global Thermostat uses amine-based sorbents bound to carbon sponges to remove CO_{2} from the atmosphere. The company has projects ranging from 40 to 50,000 tonnes per year.

Global Thermostat has closed deals with Coca-Cola (which aims to use DAC to source CO_{2} for its carbonated beverages) and ExxonMobil which intends to start a DAC‑to‑fuel business using Global Thermostat's technology.

=== Soletair power ===
Soletair Power is a startup founded in 2016, located in Lappeenranta, Finland, operating in the fields of Direct Air Capture and Power-to-X. The startup is primarily backed by the Finnish technology group Wärtsilä. According to Soletair Power, its technology is the first to combine Direct Air Capture with buildings' HVAC systems. The technology captures CO_{2} from the air running through a building's existing ventilation units inside buildings for removing atmospheric CO_{2} while reducing the building's net emissions. The captured CO_{2} is mineralized to concrete, stored or utilized to create synthetic products like food, textile or renewable fuel. In 2020, Wärtsilä, together with Soletair Power and Q Power, created their first demonstration unit of Power-to-X for Dubai Expo 2020, that can produce synthetic methane from captured CO_{2} from buildings.

=== Prometheus Fuels ===
Prometheus Fuels is a start-up company based in Santa Cruz which launched out of Y Combinator in 2019 to remove CO_{2} from the air and turn it into zero-net-carbon gasoline and jet fuel. The company uses a DAC technology, adsorbing CO_{2} from the air directly into process electrolytes, where it is converted into alcohols by electrocatalysis. The alcohols are then separated from the electrolytes using carbon nanotube membranes, and upgraded to gasoline and jet fuels. Since the process uses only electricity from renewable sources, the fuels are carbon neutral when used, emitting no net CO_{2} to the atmosphere.

=== Heirloom Carbon Technologies ===
Heirloom's first direct air capture facility opened in Tracy, California, in November 2023. The facility can remove up to 1,000 U.S. tons of CO_{2} annually, which is then mixed into concrete using technologies from CarbonCure. Heirloom also has a contract with Microsoft in which the latter will purchase 315,000 metric tons of CO_{2} removal.

=== Other companies ===
- Center for Negative Carbon Emissions of Arizona State University
- Carbfix – a subsidiary of Reykjavik Energy, Iceland
- Energy Impact Center – a research institute that advocates for the use nuclear energy to power direct air capture technologies
- Mission Zero Technologies — a startup in London, UK
- Carbyon – a startup in Eindhoven, the Netherlands
- EDIBON - A Madrid, Spain based initiative advancing education and research in emission capture technologies.

=== Innovations in research ===
Within the research domain, the ETH Zurich team's development of a photoacid solution for direct air capture marks a significant innovation. This technology, still under refinement, stands out for its minimal energy requirements and its chemical process that enables efficient CO_{2} capture and release. This method's potential for scalability and its environmental benefits align it with ongoing efforts by other companies listed in this section, contributing to the global pursuit of effective and sustainable carbon capture solutions.Recent research suggests that integrating warehouse automation systems into DAC facilities can reduce operational costs and improve scalability by streamlining equipment handling and system maintenance.

== Political discourse ==
=== Environmentalist opposition ===
In the United States there is conflict between politicians and politically unaffiliated environmental advocates on Direct Air Capture as it relates to economic benefit and efficiency in improving climate change associated risks.

One of the main grievances climate campaigners have is in regards to how DAC is perceived to be at best, a costly irrelevance to the more pressing need to cut emissions and, is a ploy that is utilized to maintain the fossil fuel industry's status quo, and perpetuate pollution The Stratos Project, was purchased by Occidental Petroleum for $1.1 billion. This investment is regarded by some as an attempt to extend the longevity of the fossil fuel industry. The Stratos project is ultimately owned by Occidental Petroleum, an American oil company that bought Carbon Engineering on November 3, 2023 for $1.1bn and views carbon removal as a sort of future-proofing for its industry. Jonathan Foley, executive director of Project Drawdown (a research-based plan to reverse global warming and stop climate change) regards DAC technology as a greenwashing exercise, that mitigates climate change issues but does not seek to solve them. The Consumer's Association of Penang perceive DAC to be something that exacerbates the climate crisis, and is fundamentally against the principle of climate justice.

A study conducted in 2024, analyzed the conditional support of DAC technologies in the United States. The study revealed that most of the participants who were familiar with DAC technology and had concerns about climate change had questions regarding the moral hazards of DAC technology. Participants expressed disdain for the possibility that DAC might allow companies to continue pollutive practices while greenwashing their public image was raised across all focus groups. Other participants worried that DAC technology would be used as a front by fossil fuel corporations, to create the illusion that something was being done to combat climate change without contributing real benefit to the environment.

Environmentalist opposition to DAC often concerns the ecological impacts of the associated energy infrastructure. Complications associated with the impact DAC may have on air quality in specific communities are called into question as well. Some critics of DAC are in opposition to the technology because of the locations they tend to be placed in, as some feel that these projects are always developed in poor areas, objectors expressed that they feel "experimented on."

Another study focusing on perceptions of DAC technology from climate concerned persons from the United States and the United Kingdom found similar results. A theme across all groups was the perception of DAC as a technology that is incongrous with the vision for a sustainable society. Participants reported DAC to be "reactionary" to climate change as opposed to a viable solution to it. A consistent theme across all workshops was the idea that CDR does not necessarily reflect people's 'vision' for a sustainable future society: "The survey also showed that "very few people believed that CDR deals with the root cause of emissions." The study revealed that the overall perception was that DAC is merely an intervention that fails to address the root cause of climate change and instead sustains the contributors to the crisis itself.'

Political opposition to DAC technology has also been related to doubts in the feasibility of DAC development and deployment at scale. Technologies analogous with DAC such as CCS and BECCS have been subject to immense public opposition. These technologies have also been characterized by multiple failures and aborted projects, contributing to the already persistent doubt regarding the credibility of DAC projects.

=== Biden's Bipartisan Infrastructure Law ===
Some environmentalists believe that the 3.5 billion investment in DAC is a "dangerous gamble" that puts the lives of frontline communities at risk. The Institute of Policy studies regards this decision to be risky because "the promise of DAC may never materialize" and should the deployment of this technology fail, the result will be only harm on frontline communities in "new and unacceptable ways". Surveys revealed that among those against DAC Trust in local government was generally low, in addition to mistrust in fossil fuel companies who sponsor DAC development. Environmentalists lack of faith in the bipartisan infrastructure law grew after a 2020 Treasury Department Inspector General investigation revealed that 90% of the tax credits used for carbon capture operations were done so without verifying that any carbon was being captured. Additionally, the IRS decision to not release information about which companies are benefiting from these new investments in DAC increases uncertainty among people who are concerned how their taxes are paying for DAC development.

=== Partisan perception in the United States ===
A poll taken in 2023 assessing the opinions on Direct Air Capture based on political party affiliation found that, 42% of Democrats were strongly in favor of DAC, 34% of independent voters were in favor while only 28% of Republicans indicated their fervent support of DAC technology. However, despite the negative response from the climate conscious community, politically, DAC technology has received bipartisan support in government.

The reason for bipartisan support for DAC seems to be due to two merits, the environmental benefit of DAC and the potential economic advantages. Republicans argue that DAC can provide economic advantages to the countries and local areas hosting these facilities through job creation, increase tax revenue and economic diversification. The economic utility DAC also provides is protection for fossil fuel industries as many including ExxonMobil have donated generously to DAC research and development. Bipartisan support stems from the perception of DAC as a solution that satisfies economic and environmental concerns. However, despite bipartisan support for DAC in congress, a survey conducted in 2024 revealed that "Republicans and Independents were significantly less likely than Democrats to support the development of DAC in and near their communities and in the U.S."

Much of the discourse surrounding DAC comes from environmental activists, and though there are discrepancies in how Republicans and Democrats view DAC, these differences are generally relegated to the perception of the benefits DAC offers. Some view DAC as a feasible solution to combat global warming (primarily Democrats), whereas Republicans support for DAC lies in the way the technology will not interfere with the economic interests of fossil fuel companies.

== Direct air capture shortcomings ==
=== BECCS project ===
Bioenergy with carbon capture and storage (BECCS) has come under scrutiny for a variety of reasons but primarily because the technology is energy intensive, requires large land changes/usage and has the potential to leak carbon dioxide back into the atmosphere. Environmentalists argued that BECCS was an infeasible option because of the emissions that the project would produce. BECCS is proposed as a solution based on the assumption that bioenergy would be carbon neutral. This assumption was found to be incorrect because many believe that the deforestation, logging and land required to accommodate this technology would offset the amount of carbon the technology removes. Individuals concerned with protecting animal life also argue that increasing demand for land for BECCS would be an additional threat to biodiversity. Opponents also argue that the risk of a carbon dioxide leak outweighs the potential benefits if the technology functions properly. Carbon dioxide that is stored underground has a high risk of leakage, and the consequences of a major leak could be catastrophic. "Atmospheric CO_{2} levels could spike significantly, especially if a leak were to occur from a major storage site." Anxiety surrounding the possibility of a CO_{2} leakage is common worry among those who doubt DAC.

=== Energy requirements of DAC systems ===
DAC requires a lot of energy, estimates vary around 1 to 2.5 MWh of electricity per tonne of CO2. A 2026 study estimated that removing 2Gt of CO2 annually would require more than half of 2024 US electricity generation. However heat pumps and geothermal heat can be used.

== See also ==
- Artificial photosynthesis
- Carbon dioxide removal
- CityTrees
- Smog tower
