= Orkuveita Reykjavíkur =

Icelandic energy and utility company

Coordinates: 64°07′13″N 21°48′04″W

Reykjavík Energy
- Native name: Orkuveita Reykjavíkur
- Industry: Energy
- Founded: 1 January 1999
- Headquarters: Reykjavík, Iceland
- Products: Electricity, geothermal energy, utilities
- Owner: Reykjavík, Akranes, Borgarbyggð
- Subsidiaries: Veitur; ON Power; Reykjavík Fibre Network
- Website: www.or.is/en

Orkuveita Reykjavíkur (Icelandic pronunciation: [ˈɔr̥kʏˌveiːta ˈreiːcaˌviːkʏr̥]; English: Reykjavík Energy) is an Icelandic energy and utility company that provides electricity, geothermal district heating, mains water, sewage and telecommunications services through its subsidiaries. The company's service area extends to 20 communities in the south-west part of Iceland. The company is owned by the City of Reykjavík (93.5%) and the Municipalities of Akranes (5.5%) and Borgarbyggð (1%).

== History ==
Orkuveita Reykjavíkur (Reykjavik Energy) was established 1 January 1999, by uniting Rafmagnsveita Reykjavíkur (Reykjavík Electricity) and Hitaveita Reykjavíkur (Reykjavík District Heating). Rafmagnsveita Reykjavíkur was established in the year 1921. Hitaveita Reykjavíkur became an independent company in 1946, having been in operation as a public entity since 1930. In the year 2000 Vatnsveita Reykjavíkur (Reykjavík Water) was united with Orkuveita Reykjavíkur, but the former started operation 16 June 1909.

Orkuveita Reykjavíkur was obliged by law to unbundle its electricity operations by January 1, 2014. Thus came about the subsidiaries Orka náttúrunnar ohf. (ON Power) and Veitur ohf. (Veitur Utilities), thereby splitting electricity generation and distribution.

=== Other subsidiaries ===
In 2007, Gagnaveita Reykjavíkur (Reykjavík Fibre Network) commenced operations, later renamed to Ljósleiðarinn (The Fibre), providing wholesale-access fibre connectivity to homes and businesses. Carbfix, founded in 2007, is a subsidiary that aims to develop a cost-effective approach to permanently storing CO_{2} by dissolving it in water and injecting it into basaltic rocks.

== Geothermal plants ==
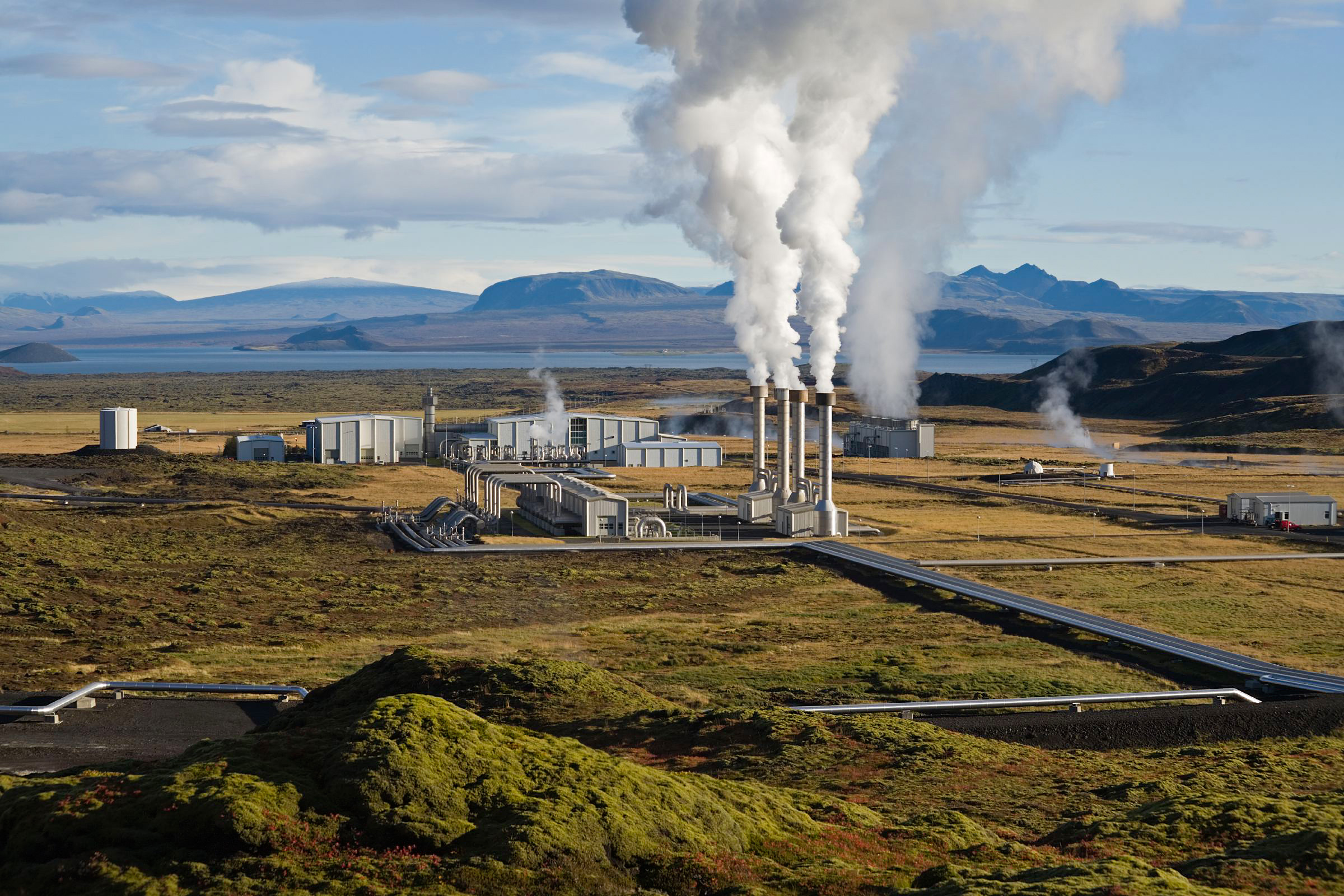
Nesjavellir Geothermal Power Station, near Hengill.

Orkuveita Reykjavíkur owns and operates the Nesjavellir and Hellisheiði geothermal power stations. The plants are cogeneration plants (CHP) provide both electricity and hot water to industries and households in the Reykjavík capital area. 99% of housing in this area is heated with hot water provided by geothermal sources. Both plants are situated in the Hengill region; an active volcanic ridge.

== Board and management ==
The board of directors at Orkuveita Reykjavíkur is appointed by the Reykjavík and Akranes City Councils. Reykjavík appoints five members and Akranes appoints one. The Borgarbyggð Council appoints an attending representative.

== See also ==
- Electricity sector in Iceland
- Landsvirkjun
