= Carbfix =

Icelandic company

- Industry: Carbon sequestration
- Founded: 2007
- Founders: Reykjavík Energy, the University of Iceland, CNRS, and the Earth Institute at Columbia University
- Headquarters: Reykjavík, Iceland
- Website: https://www.carbfix.com/

Carbfix is an Icelandic company founded in 2007. It has developed an approach to permanently store CO_{2} by dissolving it in water and injecting it into basaltic rocks. Once in the subsurface, the injected CO_{2} reacts with the host rock forming stable carbonate minerals, thus providing permanent storage of the injected CO_{2}

Approximately 200 tons of CO_{2} were injected into subsurface basalts in a first-of-a-kind pilot injection in SW-Iceland in 2012. Research results published in 2016 showed that 95% of the injected CO_{2} was solidified into calcite within 2 years, using 25 tons of water per ton of CO_{2}. Since 2014, this technology has been applied to the emissions of the Hellisheiði Geothermal Power Plant. H_{2}S and CO_{2} are co-captured from the emission stream of the power station and permanently and safely stored via in-situ carbon mineralization at the Húsmúli reinjection site. The process captures approximately one-third of the CO_{2} emissions (12,000 tCO_{2}/y) and 60% of the H_{2}S emissions (6,000 tH_{2}S/y) from the power plant. The Silverstone project aims to deploy full-scale CO_{2} capture, injection, and mineral storage at the Hellisheiði Geothermal Power Plant from 2025 onwards.

Carbfix is currently operating four injection sites in Iceland in relation to the Hellisheiði Geothermal Power Plant: the Nesjavellir Geothermal Power Plant, The Orca direct air capture plant near Hellisheiði and within the CO_{2} Seastone project in Helguvík.

== Background ==
Carbfix was founded by the then Icelandic President, Dr Ólafur Ragnar Grímsson, Einar Gunnlaugsson at Reykjavík Energy, Wallace S. Broecker at Columbia University, Eric H. Oelkers at CNRS Toulouse (France), and Sigurður Reynir Gíslason at the University of Iceland to limit the Greenhouse gas emissions in Iceland. Reykjavik Energy supplied the initial funding for Carbfix. Further funding has been supplied by The European Commission and the Department of Energy of the United States. In addition to finding a new method for permanent carbon dioxide storage, another objective of the project was to train scientists.

== Method ==
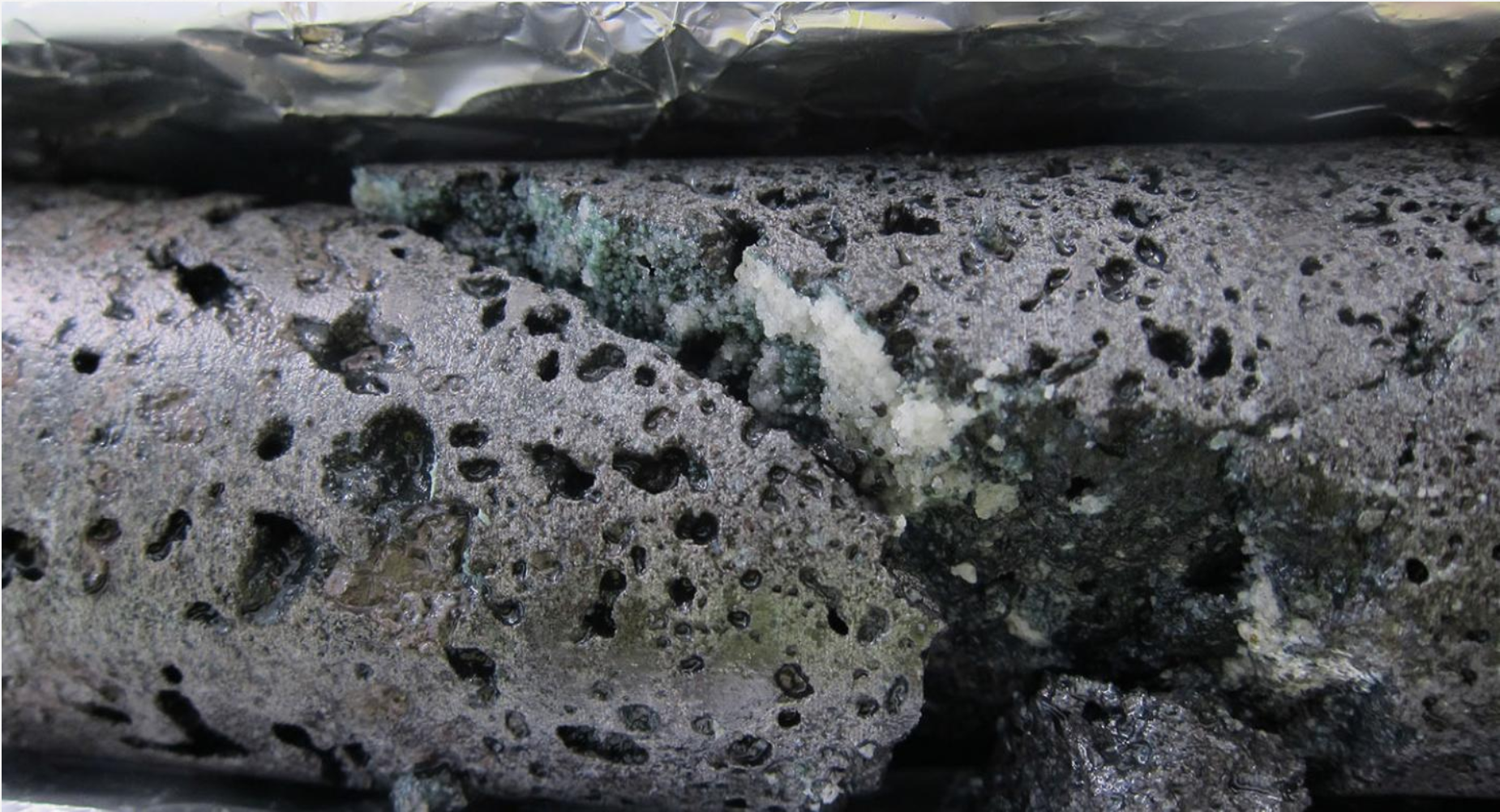
Image of calcite formed in basalt due to CO_{2}-charged water-rock interaction at the Carbfix site

Captured CO_{2} is dissolved in water, either prior to or during injection into mafic or ultramafic formations, such as basalts. The dissolution of CO_{2} in water can be expressed as:

CO_{2} (g) + H_{2}O(l) ⇌ H_{2}CO_{3} (aq)

↔ H_{3}O^{+}(aq) + HCO_{3}^{-} (aq)

↔ 2H_{3}O^{+}(aq) + CO_{3}^{2-}(aq)

By dissolving the CO_{2} in water instant solubility trapping is achieved, which is the second most secure trapping mechanism of CO_{2} storage: No CO_{2} bubbles are present in the CO_{2}-charged water, which is furthermore denser than the water that is present in the formation, so that the CO_{2}-charged water has rather the tendency to sink than to migrate upwards towards the surface.

The CO_{2}-charged water is acidic, typically having a pH of 3-5 depending on the partial pressure of CO_{2}, water composition, and the temperature of the system. The CO_{2}-charged water reacts with the subsurface rocks and dissolves cations such as calcium, magnesium, and iron. The dissolution of cation-bearing silicate minerals; for example, the dissolution of pyroxene, a common mineral in basalt and peridotite, can be expressed as:

2H_{3}O^{+} + (Ca,Mg,Fe)SiO_{3} = Ca^{2+}, Mg^{2+}, Fe^{2+} + H_{4}SiO_{4} + H_{2}O

The cations can react with the dissolved CO_{2} to form stable carbonate minerals, such as calcite (CaCO_{3}), magnesite (MgCO_{3}), and siderite (FeCO_{3}), a reaction that can be expressed as:

Ca^{2+},Mg^{2+},Fe^{2+}(aq) + CO_{3}^{2-}(aq) → CaCO_{3} (s), MgCO_{3} (s), FeCO_{3} (s)

Ultramafic and mafic rock formations are most efficient due to their high reactivity and their abundance in divalent metal cations. The degree to which the released cations form minerals depends on the element, the pH and the temperature.

== Practicalities ==
Drilling and injecting carbonated water at high pressure into basaltic rocks at Hellisheiði has been estimated to cost less than $25 per ton of carbon dioxide sequestered.

This project commenced carbon injection in 2012. The funding was supplied by the University of Iceland, Columbia University, France's National Centre of Scientific Research, the United States Department of Energy, the EU, Nordic funds and Reykjavik Energy.

These funding sources include the European Union's Horizon 2020 research and innovation programme under grant agreements No. 764760 and 764810. The European Commission through the projects CarbFix (EC coordinated action 283148), Min-GRO (MC-RTN-35488), Delta-Min (PITN-GA-2008-215360), and CO_{2}-REACT (EC Project 317235). Nordic fund 11029-NORDICCS; the Icelandic GEORG Geothermal Research fund (09-02-001) to S.R.G. and Reykjavik Energy; and the U.S. Department of Energy under award number DE-FE0004847.

Cost is around US$25 per tonne of CO_{2}.

== Challenges ==
Reinjection of geothermal fluid from the Hellisheiði Geothermal Power Plant started in Húsmúli reinjection field, in September 2011. Commissioning of the reinjection site caused significant induced seismicity that was felt in nearby communities. This problem was addressed by introducing a new workflow where preventive steps are taken to minimize this risk, including the adjustment of the injection rates. The implementation of the workflow resulted in the decrease of the annual number of seismic events greater than magnitude 2 in the area from 96 in 2011 to one in 2018, which is considered satisfactory and demonstrates that current operations are within regulatory boundaries.

Carbfix started injection of CO_{2} captured from the Hellisheiði Geothermal Power Plant and dissolved in condensate from the plant's turbines into one of the existing reinjection wells in the Húsmúli reinjection field in April 2014. No increased seismicity was noted after the injection of CO_{2} started implying that seismicity is not induced by the injection of the condensate-dissolved CO_{2}.

== Current status ==
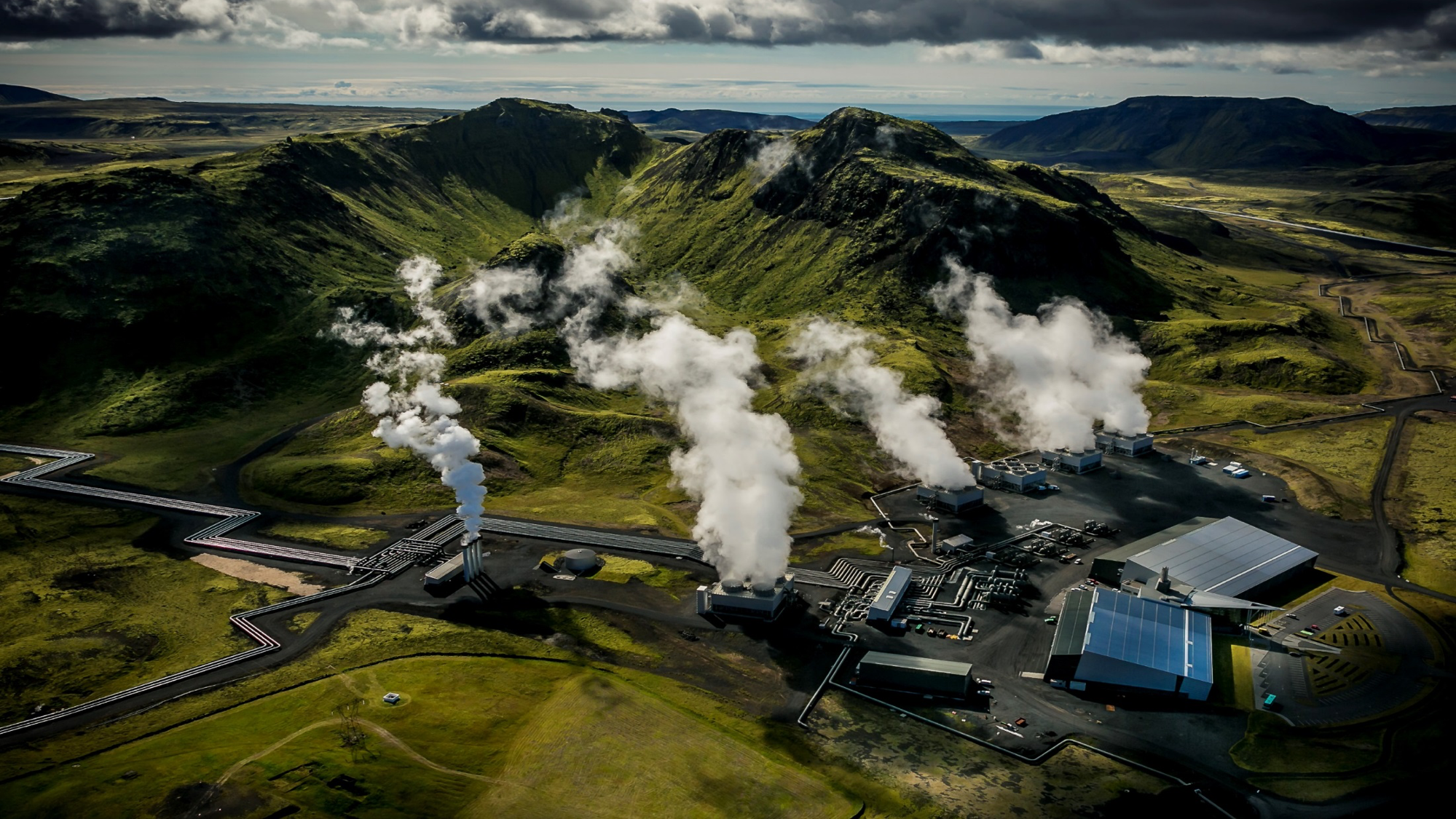
The Hellisheiði Geothermal Power Plant is the site of the original Carbfix project, which injected approximately 200 tons of CO_{2} into the subsurface and fixed it as stable carbonate minerals.

Carbfix is currently operating four injection sites in Iceland with emphasis on injection of CO_{2} captured from point-sources of CO_{2}, CO_{2} that is captured and transported to an injection site, and CO_{2} that is captured directly from the atmosphere using direct air capture (DAC) technology.

=== Point source capture and mineral storage of CO_{2} ===
Since June 2014, Carbfix has captured and injected CO_{2} and hydrogen sulfide (H_{2}S) from Hellisheiði Geothermal Power Plant. The geothermal gases are dissolved in condensate from the power plant's turbines in a specially designed scrubbing tower and injected to a depth of 750 m underground into basaltic rocks. Currently about 68% of the H_{2}S and 34% of the CO_{2} from the plant's emissions are captured and injected, which amounts to about 12,000 tons of CO_{2} per year, and about 5,000 tons of H_{2}S per year. Results show that over 60% of the injected CO_{2} was mineralized within 4 months of injection, and over 85% of the injected H_{2}S within 4 months of injection.

Carbfix is currently working on scaling up the operations at the Hellisheiði Geothermal Power Plant through the EU Innovation Fund project Silverstone, aiming for near-zero geothermal power production from 2025 by capturing over 95% of CO_{2} and 99% of H_{2}S from the plant's emissions. This accounts for up to 40,000 tons of CO_{2} and up to 12,000 tons of H_{2}S per year.

Since early 2023, Carbfix has started the capture and injection of CO_{2} and H_{2}S from the Nesjavellir Geothermal Power Plant in SW-Iceland as a part of the Europe Horizon 2020 funded GECO project. The same approach is used as at the Hellisheiði Geothermal Power Plant, but with optimized capturing efficiency of the scrubbing tower. The gases are dissolved in condensate from the plant's turbines and injected into the basaltic subsurface below 900 m.

=== Injection and mineral storage of CO_{2} captured from the atmosphere using direct air capture technologies ===
The world's first injection of CO_{2} captured from the atmosphere was carried out in Hellisheiði in SW-Iceland in 2017, as part of the Europe H2020 funded project CarbFix2. The CO_{2} was captured using a Direct Air Capture (DAC) unit developed by the Swiss green-tech company Climeworks. The CO_{2} was then dissolved in water and injected into the basaltic subsurface.

In 2021, the world's first commercial DAC combined with storage plant, Orca, was commissioned in Hellisheiði in collaboration between Climeworks and Carbfix. The plant has the capacity to capture up to 3,600 tons of CO_{2} directly from the atmosphere that are injected into basalts for permanent mineral storage.

In 2024 Climeworks and Carbfix are commissioning the Mammoth DAC plant, with the capacity to capture up to 36,000 tons per year which will be injected into the basalt for permanent mineral storage at the Geothermal Park in Hellisheiði.

=== CO_{2} capture, transport and storage ===
Cross-border transport of CO_{2} was first demonstrated as part of the DemoUpCarma project in August 2022. The project was funded by the Swiss Federal Offices and led by ETH. The CO_{2} was captured from a biogas upgrading plant in Bern, Switzerland, and transported to Iceland where it was first injected at the Hellisheiði site. The current injection site of DemoUpCarma project is in Helguvík, Iceland, where the CO_{2} is co-injected with seawater as part of the R&D project CO_{2}Seastone.

In July 2021, Carbfix was awarded the largest research grant ever granted to an Icelandic company, when it was nominated for the EU Innovation Fund grant of 15 million € for the Coda Terminal project.

The Coda Terminal will be developed in Straumsvík, SW-Iceland as the first cross-border carbon transport and storage hub in Iceland. CO_{2} will be captured at industrial sites in N-Europe, focusing on the hard-to-abate sector, and shipped to the Terminal where it will be unloaded into onshore tanks for temporary storage. The CO_{2} will then be pumped into a network of nearby injection wells where it will be dissolved in water during injection into the basaltic bedrock. The operations will be scaled up in steps reaching up to 3 million tons of CO_{2} per year from 2031. For comparison, the CO_{2}-emissions of Iceland, a country of some 400,000 people, varied between 3,340,000 tonnes (3,290,000 long tons; 3,680,000 short tons) (2020) and 3,810,000 tonnes (3,750,000 long tons; 4,200,000 short tons) (2008) in the 2007-2023 period. Iceland's energy sector is among the lowest carbon emitting per unit of electricity produced due to the high penetration of hydropower and geothermal energy. However, per-capita electricity consumption is unusually high due to the large energy demand of Iceland's aluminum smelters.

== Awards ==
In July 2025, the company was one of the winners of the WIPO Global Awards in the category of environment for small and medium-sized enterprises (SMEs).
