= Caring Cancer Trust =

The Caring Cancer Trust is a UK-based registered charity that raises money for non-animal tested cancer research. The Charity was honoured by the University of Manchester in 2015 by induction into the President's Beyer Circle of Philanthropy for its financial support for the Manchester Viral Oncology laboratories. Caring Cancer Trust also runs annual Kids2Go Healing Holidays of Adventure for children recovering from cancer, taking groups of children referred to them by hospital paediatric oncology units in southern England to the Alps.

A similar Create2Go programme of Art and Music workshops for children recovering from cancer who have a potential creative talent that has been thwarted by their illness was launched in 2015 by the Charity with the help of the Midnight Gallery of London.

Patrons of the charity include Professor Ian Hampson PhD, Dr Lynne Hampson PhD, (Institute of Cancer Sciences, University of Manchester), Graham Bell (Olympic skier and broadcaster), Jenny Jones (Olympic snowboarder medallist) and Jamie Nicholls (Olympic snowboarder). The charity is based in Ryde on the Isle of Wight and is wholly run and managed by unpaid volunteers. Its sole source of income is from voluntary sources; legacies and public and corporate donations.

== Mission ==
- To provide hands-on in-patient support to children with cancer, working in association with regional hospital specialist children's oncology units in southern England and providing amenities and where necessary, financial aid in visiting travel costs for needy parents and siblings.
- To provide special Kids2Go Healing Holidays of Creative Adventure for out-patient children recovering from cancer, enabling them to regain their self-confidence and re-ignite their passion for life after the trauma of their illness and lengthy treatment.
- To provide emergency funds for amenities, equipment and facilities to cancer sufferers in order to ameliorate their sickness, improve their quality of life, limit their stress and, where possible, help their recovery.
- To fund ethical original non-animal tested research into the causes, early diagnosis, treatment and cure or prevention of cervical, blood and ovarian cancers, at the University of Manchester Viral Oncology Research Laboratories.
- To provide and disseminate up-to-date information on cancer prevention through lifestyle and diet, together with clinical research results for cancer prevention, treatment and cure.

== See also ==
- Cancer in the United Kingdom
- Animal welfare in the United Kingdom
