= Hellisheiði Power Station =

Geothermal power station in Iceland

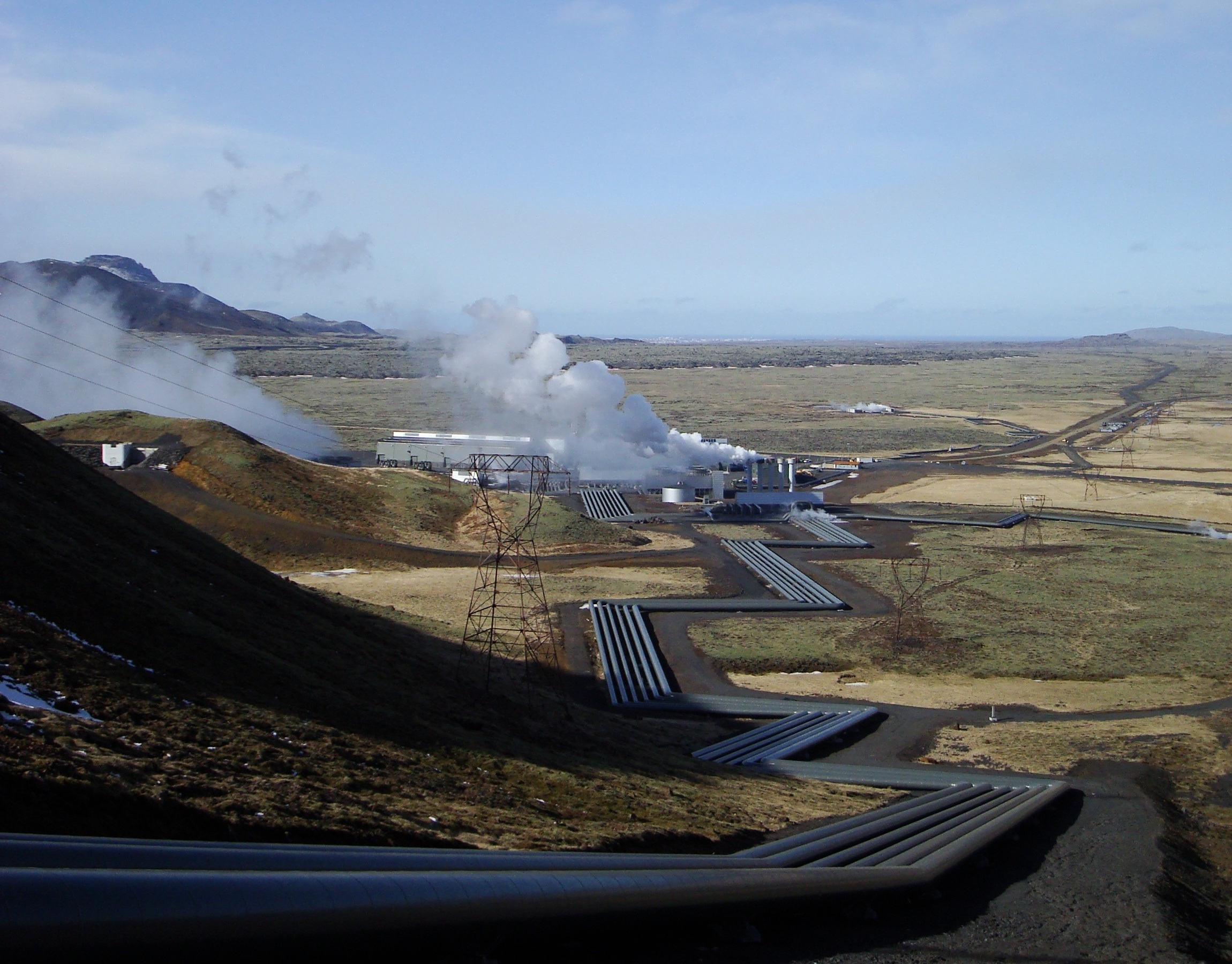
- Country: Iceland
- Location: Hengill
- Coordinates: 64°02′14″N 21°24′03″W
- Status: Operational
- Commission date: 2006
- Owner: ON Power

Geothermal power station
- Type: Flash steam
- Wells: 50
- Max. well depth: 2,200 m (7,200 ft)
- Cogeneration?: Yes
- Thermal capacity: 200 MWt

Power generation
- Units operational: 6 x 45 MW; 1 x 33 MW
- Nameplate capacity: 303 MW

External links
- Website: www.or.is
- Commons: Related media on Commons

The Hellisheiði Power Station (Icelandic: Hellisheiðarvirkjun, Icelandic pronunciation: [ˈhɛtlɪsˌheiːðarˌvɪr̥cʏn]) is the eighth-largest geothermal power station in the world and largest in Iceland. The facility is located in Hengill, southwest Iceland, 11 km (7 mi) from the Nesjavellir Geothermal Power Station. The plant has a capacity of 303 MW of electricity and 200 MWth of hot water for Reykjavík's district heating. The power station is owned and operated by ON Power, a subsidiary of Reykjavík Energy.

== History ==
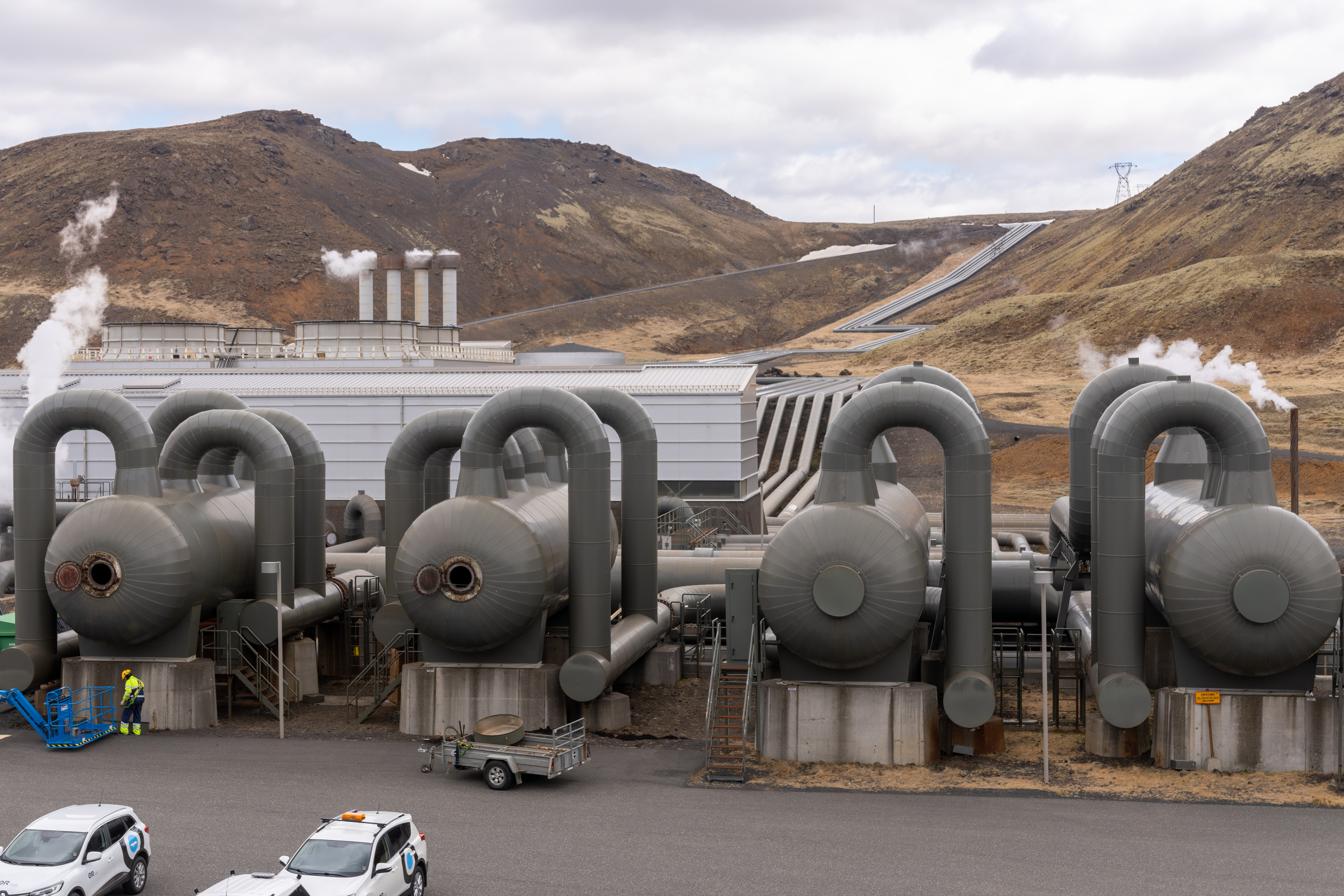
Hellisheidi Geothermal Plant

Electricity production with two 45 MW turbines commenced in 2006. In 2007, an additional low-pressure steam turbine of 33 MW was added. In 2008, two 45 MW turbines were added with steam from Skarðsmýrarfjall Mountain. The hot water plant was introduced in 2010 and the last two high pressure 45 MW turbines were added in 2011. In order to reduce hydrogen sulphide pollution in the capital area, a system was added to the plant in 2014 which reinjects non-condensable gases into the ground. In 2020, the hot water production was increased to 200 MWth to meet the increased district heating demand as the capital area expands.

=== Renewed drilling ===
In 2016, the operator, ON, announced a program of new drilling to deal with falling steam levels, which had first become apparent in 2013. The program was expected in 2017 to cost 19 billion Icelandic crowns to maintain a steady electric output.

== Features ==
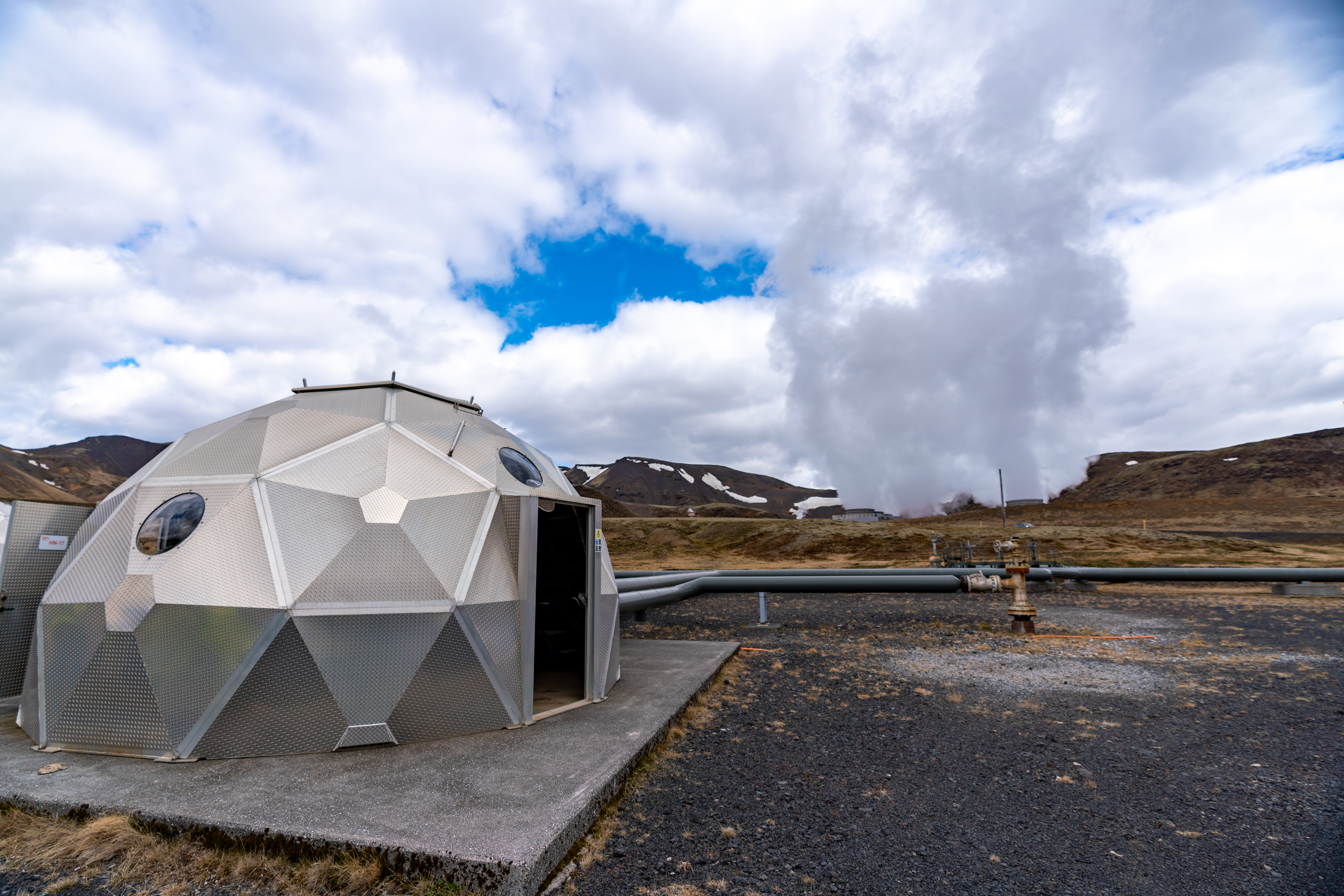
Boreholes and pipes at the Hellisheidi Geothermal Plant.

The power plant offers educational tours and presentations about sustainable energy as part of its geothermal energy exhibition.

A pilot direct air capture facility operated by Climeworks is located at this site. It was partially funded by the European Union's Horizon 2020 program and captures up to 4,000 metric tons of carbon dioxide each year. The carbon dioxide is captured, injected into the ground, and mineralized.

== See also ==
- Geothermal power in Iceland
- List of largest power stations in the world
- List of power stations in Iceland
- Renewable energy in Iceland
- CarbFix
