= Society of Cardiovascular Computed Tomography =

The Society of Cardiovascular Computed Tomography is a United States-based medical specialty professional society in the field of X-ray computed tomography for the circulatory system.

== Work ==
Founded in 2005, the Society of Cardiovascular Computed Tomography (SCCT) is the international professional society devoted exclusively to cardiovascular computed tomography (CCT), with members from over 60 countries. SCCT is a community of physicians, scientists and technologists advocating for research, education and clinical excellence in the use of CCT.
