= Þorgils gjallandi =

Þorgils gjallandi (1 June 1851 – 23 June 1915) was an Icelandic author born in the hamlet of Skútustaðir by Mývatn, a lake in the Skútustaðahreppur rural municipality.

His name at birth was Jón Stefánsson, but he adopted the name "Þorgils gjallandi" as his nom de plume. The name is taken from the epic Egils Saga. The original Þorgils gjallandi was a servant in the household of Þórólfr, who was the elder son of Kveldúlfr and the paternal uncle of Viking poet Egill Skallagrímsson; gjallandi is not a proper name but an epithet meaning "the yelling" or "the bellowing."

Many of his stories relate the achievements of nonconformist people who lacked the professional standing to silence their antagonists.

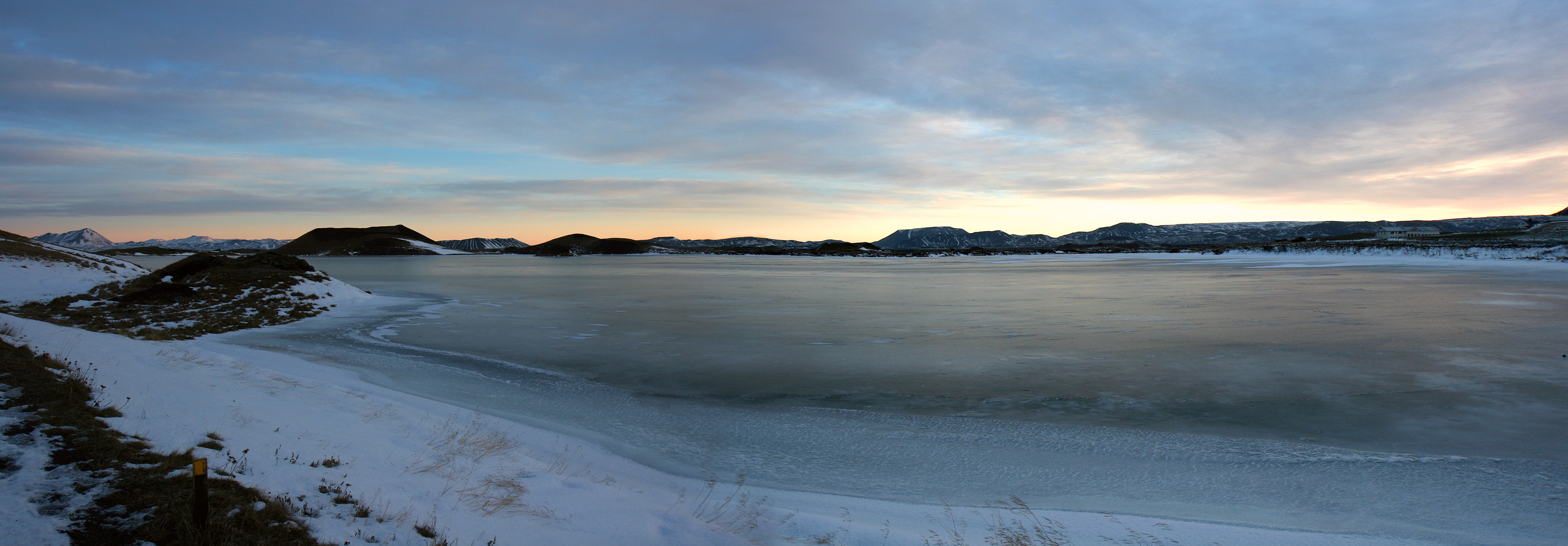
View of Mývatn near Skútustaðir, edged with pseudocraters, looking east, November 2007.

== Early years ==
Jón Stefánsson lived his whole life in the county of Suður-Þingeyjar and from 1890 was the manager (hreppstjóri) of a poor-law parish (hreppur) there. Only twice did he travel outside the county boundaries.

He was the eldest child of Stefán Helgason (1822–1868) and Guðrún Ólafsdóttir (1816–1860). He had three full siblings, all of whom died in early childhood: Stefán (b. 1856) died the day after his birth, and Pétur (b. 1853) and Hólmfríður (b. 1857) both died in 1860, a few months before their mother's death. Jón's father remarried in 1862, to Sigurbjörg Jónsdóttir, and they had four children: Pétur, Guðrún, Helgi and Hólmfríður. Jón was only 17 when his father also died. Inheriting the farmstead, he worked the land for a year and then began working as a farmhand in various places in the county; he worked the longest for a younger brother of his late father, Hjálmar Helgason (1833–1916), and his wife Sigríður Vilhelmína Pétursdóttir (1843–1928).

In 1877 he married Guðný Jakobína Pétursdóttir (1850–1939), the daughter of Pétur Jónsson, a Reykjahlíð farmer. They had a son who died in infancy, followed by two daughters, Guðrún (1880–1943) and Védís (1885–1963). By 1889 Jón and his family had acquired a cottage at Litluströnd, where they lived to the end of their days.

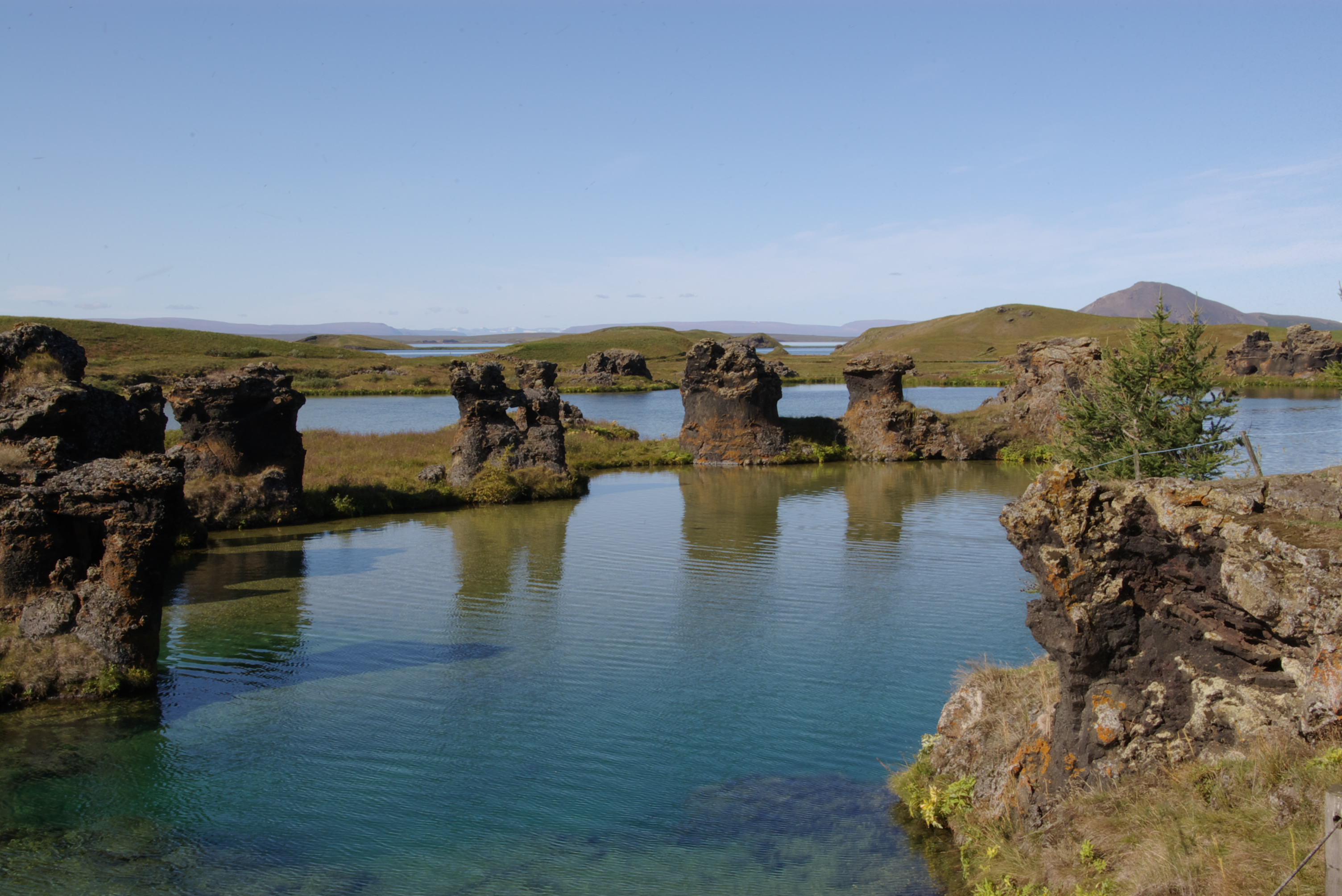
Mývatn from Höfði nature park, August 2007.

== Writing career ==
Þorgils gjallandi was one of the most determined personalities in Icelandic literature, while essentially a simple farmer and entirely self-taught in the craft of writing. His early writings can be found in newsletters distributed in the Mývatn area in the 1880s and 1890s.

His protagonists, motivated not by moral purity but by carnal needs, impelled by nature and their circumstances, seek love not through eternal ideals but through an expansive passion that is simultaneously profligate and guileless, this being his conception of human nature.

Þorgils's love stories are also tragedies, because his characters are presented as being removed from their natural state and living together under conditions that require self-denial and social inhibition. His main argument is that with its moral rules society has terrified humankind, transforming us from vigorous and powerful animals, steered by our natural desires, into revolting beasts, cunning and duplicitous.

Thorgils's collection Ofan úr sveitum ("Tales from the Country") was published in 1892. Until that time, he had had to keep hidden his most radical, realistic stories, which represented for most people in Iceland a major stumbling block to his acceptance. In 1902 the novel Upp við fossa ("By the Waterfalls") came out, but likewise failed to appeal to the tastes of his readership.

Although some critics regarded his writing as destructive and unsuitable for homes with children and young people, he was not destined to retreat to obscurity. After all, since 1893 he had written several animal stories easily appreciated by the public. In 1910 he published a selection of these stories in book form under the title Dýrasögur 1 ("Animal Stories 1").

In addition to these works, he wrote many other stories and articles and lectured on various topics.

== Works ==
=== Novels ===
- 1902: Upp við fossa ("By the Waterfalls"). ISBN 9979-67-015-0
- Gamalt og nýtt ("Old and New")

=== Short stories ===
- "Aftanskin" ("Twilight")
- "Bernskuminning" ("Memory of Childhood")
- "Brestur" ("Breaking")
- "Ef Guð lofar" ("God Permitting")
- "Einar Andrésson"
- "Frá Grími á Stöðli"
- "Fölskvi" ("Falsity")
- "Gísli húsmaður" ("Gísli the Farm Lodger")
- "Í minni hluta" ("In the Minority")
- "Kapp er best með forsjá" ("Strive Best with Foresight")
- "Karl í Kothúsi" ("The Cottager")
- "Leidd í kirkju" ("Churching")
- "Ósjálfræði" ("Dependence")
- "Seingróin sár" ("Slow-healing Sores")
- "Séra Sölvi" ("Reverend Sölvi")
- "Skírnarkjóllinn" ("The Baptismal Gown")
- "Snæfríðar þáttur" ("About Snæfríður")
- "Vetrarblótið á Gaulum"
- "Við sólhvörf" ("At Solstice")
- "Þjóðólfsþáttur" ("About Þjóðólfur")
