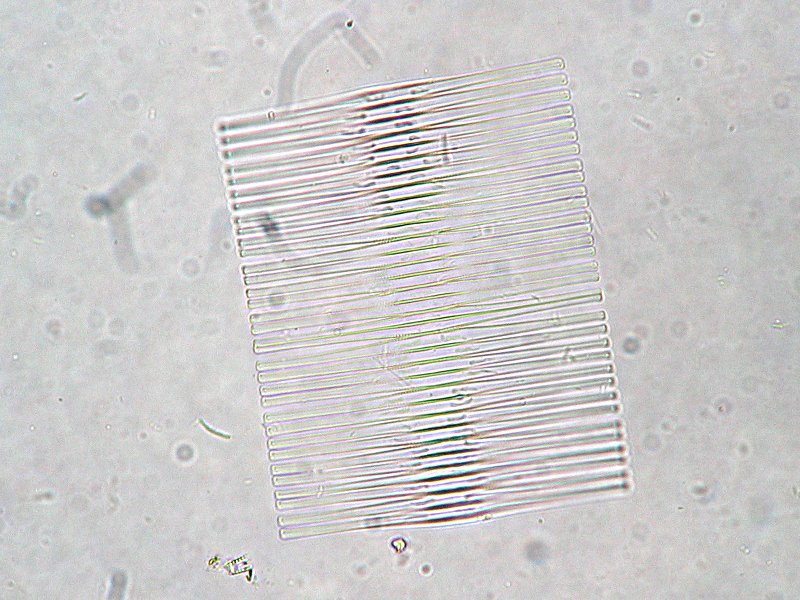
- Fragilaria crotonensis

Scientific classification
- Domain: Eukaryota
- Clade: Diaphoretickes
- Clade: SAR
- Clade: Stramenopiles
- Phylum: Gyrista
- Subphylum: Ochrophytina
- Class: Bacillariophyceae
- Order: Fragilariales
- Family: Fragilariaceae
- Genus: Fragilaria; Lyngbye (1819)

Species
- see text

= Fragilaria =

Genus of single-celled organisms

Fragilaria is a genus of freshwater and saltwater diatoms. It is usually a colonial diatom, forming filaments of cells mechanically joined by protrusions on the face and in the center of their valves. The individual diatoms appear swollen in their centers where they are joined to the colonial ribbon. The genus grows as both plankton and benthic species, free living in colonies or as epiphytes. Some species are bloom forming diatoms in eutrophic lakes. The type species is Fragilaria pectinalis Lyngbye from designating a lectotype from Conferva pectinalis O.F.Müller. The taxonomy of the genus is still uncertain.

Fragilaria has been the dominant genus of diatoms in Lake Mývatn in Iceland for at least 1200 years. The genus currently accounts for around 93% of all diatoms in the lake.

== Description ==
The Fragilaria have a pseudoraphe, rather than a true longitudinal groove in their valves. The valves are symmetrical with transverse striae.

== Selected species ==
- F. acidoclinata
- F. aconicinnum
- F. acus
- F. acutirhombica
- F. acutiuscula
- F. alpestris
- F. amphicephaloides
- F. annulata
- F. aquaplus
- F. arctica
- F. austriaca
- F. barbararum
- F. barbatula
- F. bidens
- F. bipunctata
- F. birostris
- F. brevistriata
- F. bronkei
- F. californica
- F. canariensis
- F. cassubica
- F. constricta
- F. construens
- F. crassirhombica
- F. crotonensis
- F. demerarae
- F. denticulata
- F. dibolos
- F. dzonoticola
- F. ehrenbergii
- F. eichornii
- F. excissa
- F. famelica
- F. flexura
- F. foliolum
- F. fragilarioides
- F. fremontii
- F. gedanensis
- F. germanii
- F. glebula
- F. gnathastoma
- F. goulardii
- F. gracilis
- F. gracillicima
- F. gracillima
- F. grandis
- F. grunowii
- F. hantzschiana
- F. henryi
- F. hirosakiensis
- F. hoelii
- F. husvikensis
- F. hyalina
- F. improbula
- F. incisa
- F. incognita
- F. interstincta
- F. islandica
- F. kriegeriana
- F. labei
- F. lacus-baikalensis
- F. lacus-baikali
- F. lenzii
- F. leptarthra
- F. longiceps
- F. longifusiformis
- F. magocsyi
- F. marina
- F. mazamaensis
- F. micra
- F. microvaucheriae
- F. miniscula
- F. nanana
- F. nanoides
- F. nevadensis
- F. northumbrica
- F. oblongata
- F. opacolineata
- F. pacifica
- F. pantocsekii
- F. paradoxa
- F. pararumpens
- F. parva
- F. patagonica
- F. pelta
- F. pennsylvanica
- F. perdelicatissima
- F. perminuta
- F. pseudoconstruens
- F. pseudolaevissima
- F. ptagonica
- F. punctata
- F. punctiformis
- F. quebecensis
- F. radians
- F. recapitellata
- F. rhodana
- F. riesgoviensis
- F. robusta
- F. rolandschmidtii
- F. rostrata
- F. rotundissima
- F. sandellii
- F. santaremensis
- F. saxoplanctonica
- F. schulzi
- F. schulzii
- F. similis
- F. sinuata
- F. smithiana
- F. socia
- F. sopotensis
- F. spinarum
- F. striatula
- F. submicroscopica
- F. suboldenburgiana
- F. tenera
- F. tenuicollis
- F. toxoneides
- F. turgens
- F. uliginosa
- F. ulna
- F. ulnus
- F. utermoehlii
- F. vaucheriae
- F. viereckiana
- F. virescens
- F. vitrea
- F. zeilleri
