= Cyclophora =

Cyclophora may refer to:

- Cyclophora (alga), a genus of diatoms in the class Fragilariophyceae
- Cyclophora (moth), a genus of moths in the family Geometridae
