= Reykjahlíð =

- Village
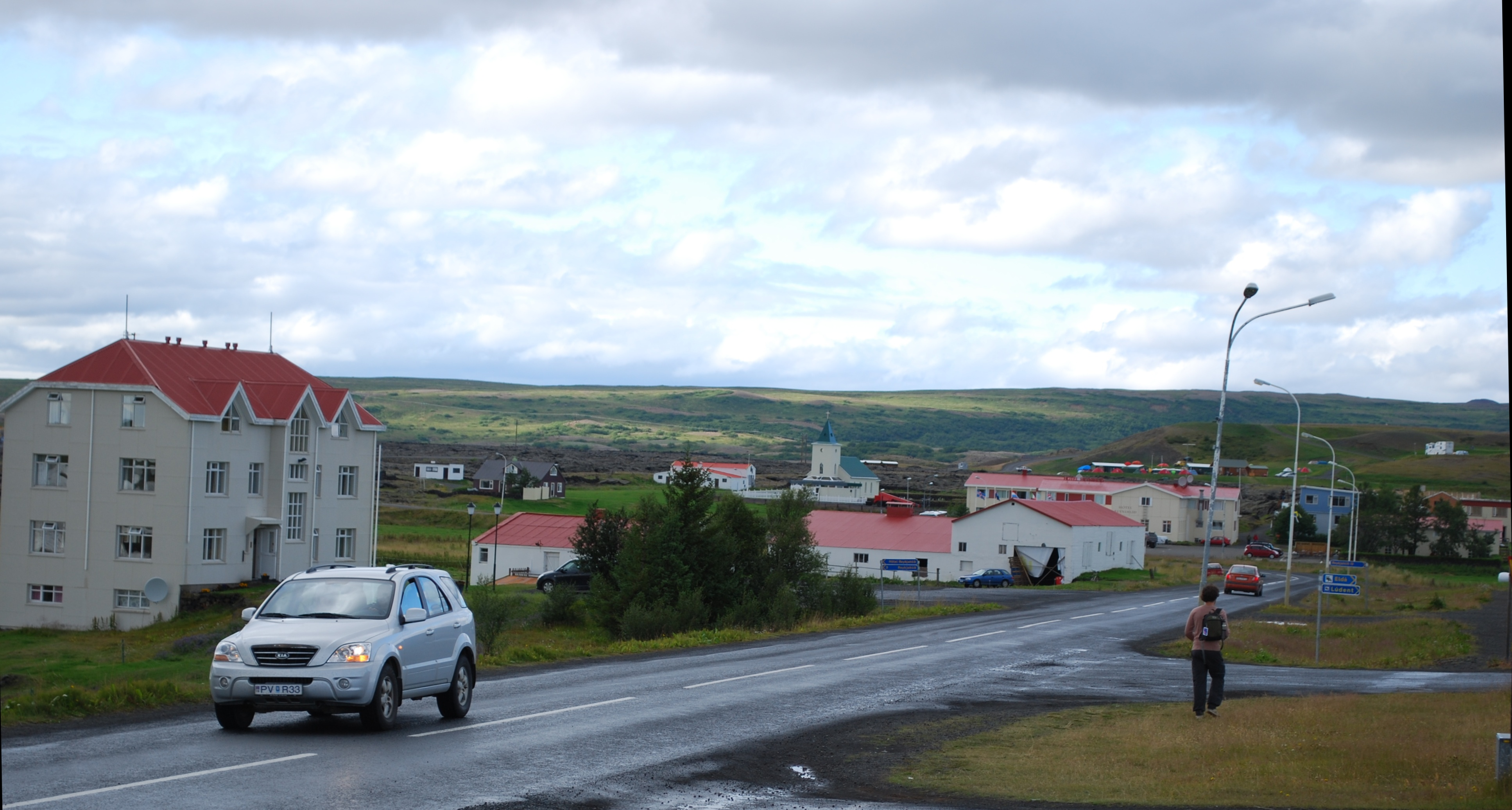

- Location of the Municipality of Þingeyjarsveit

- Location in Iceland
- Coordinates: 65°38′37″N 16°54′31″W
- Country: Iceland
- Constituency: Northeast Constituency
- Region: Northeastern Region
- Municipality: Skútustaðahreppur

Population (2021)
  - Total: 227
- Time zone: UTC+0 (GMT)
- Postal code: 660
- Website: Official website

Reykjahlíð (Icelandic pronunciation: [ˈreiːcaˌl̥iːθ]) is a village situated on the shores of Lake Mývatn in the north of Iceland. It is the seat of the municipality of Þingeyjarsveit. It has 227 inhabitants as of 2021. With an elevation of 292 meters above sea level it ranks as the highest situated town in the nation.

== Overview ==
During the so-called Mývatn fires, caused by the eruption of the nearby volcano Krafla in 1729, the village was destroyed by a lava stream. However, the inhabitants were saved when the lava flow stopped in front of the village church on higher ground, allegedly as the result of the prayers of the village priest. The church is still there, although the present building dates from 1972.

== Main sights ==
From Reykjahlíð, it is possible to go to many sights in the area, most notably Krafla. The volcano last erupted in 1984, but the vapour of a warm lava field and of sulphur springs can still be seen. Not far from there is the crater Víti (meaning "hell" in Icelandic), but looking today rather harmless with a blue lake at its bottom. Its apparent tranquility belies the fact that its last eruption was as recent as 1976.

Other interesting places are on the lake itself, like the volcano Hverfjall, the pseudo-craters of Skútusstaðir [ˈskuːtʏsˌstaːðɪr̥] and Dimmuborgir (a strange lava formation).

A local airport provides sightseeing during the summer.

A plant for extraction and processing of diatomite was a main point in local economy until 2004 when it was shut down.

Mývatn Nature Baths opened on 30 June 2004.

== Climate ==
Reykjahlíð features a tundra climate (Köppen climate classification: ET), bordering on a subarctic climate (Köppen climate classification: Dfc). Summers are typically cool with crisp nights while winters are very long and cold, but not severely cold.

Extreme temperatures ranged from −31.2 °C (−24.2 °F) on March 7, 1998 to 28.2 °C (82.8 °F) on August 10, 2004.

Climate data for Reykjahlíð, 1961–1990 normals, extremes 1961–2010
Month	Jan	Feb	Mar	Apr	May	Jun	Jul	Aug	Sep	Oct	Nov	Dec	Year
Record high °C (°F)	9.4 (48.9)	10.5 (50.9)	10.9 (51.6)	15.7 (60.3)	23.3 (73.9)	25.8 (78.4)	27.9 (82.2)	28.2 (82.8)	22.2 (72.0)	15.2 (59.4)	11.0 (51.8)	10.6 (51.1)	28.2 (82.8)
Mean daily maximum °C (°F)	−1.8 (28.8)	−0.9 (30.4)	−0.3 (31.5)	3.0 (37.4)	7.6 (45.7)	12.3 (54.1)	14.2 (57.6)	12.9 (55.2)	8.1 (46.6)	3.6 (38.5)	0.0 (32.0)	−1.4 (29.5)	4.8 (40.6)
Daily mean °C (°F)	−4.8 (23.4)	−4.1 (24.6)	−3.5 (25.7)	−0.3 (31.5)	4.0 (39.2)	8.3 (46.9)	9.9 (49.8)	9.0 (48.2)	4.8 (40.6)	1.2 (34.2)	−2.7 (27.1)	−4.5 (23.9)	1.4 (34.5)
Mean daily minimum °C (°F)	−8.4 (16.9)	−7.6 (18.3)	−7.2 (19.0)	−3.9 (25.0)	0.6 (33.1)	4.5 (40.1)	6.4 (43.5)	5.6 (42.1)	1.9 (35.4)	−1.6 (29.1)	−6.1 (21.0)	−8.0 (17.6)	−2.0 (28.4)
Record low °C (°F)	−30.5 (−22.9)	−26.6 (−15.9)	−31.2 (−24.2)	−25.7 (−14.3)	−16.1 (3.0)	−5.0 (23.0)	−1.6 (29.1)	−2.0 (28.4)	−11.5 (11.3)	−17.1 (1.2)	−26.0 (−14.8)	−27.5 (−17.5)	−31.2 (−24.2)
Average precipitation mm (inches)	33.4 (1.31)	26.2 (1.03)	32.5 (1.28)	25.4 (1.00)	20.1 (0.79)	32.3 (1.27)	47.4 (1.87)	45.6 (1.80)	44.1 (1.74)	46.2 (1.82)	43.4 (1.71)	38.0 (1.50)	435.0 (17.13)
Average precipitation days (≥ 1.0 mm)	8.2	6.5	8.2	6.8	5.1	7.0	8.9	8.2	8.1	9.9	9.7	9.9	96.8
Mean monthly sunshine hours	16.1	51.6	96.5	147.7	178.2	202.5	170.3	157.4	97.8	57.8	23.8	3.7	1,203.4
Source 1: Icelandic Met Office
Source 2: Icelandic Met Office (monthly sunshine hours 1981-2010 for Haganes-9 km (5.6 mi) from Reykjahlíð) (extremes)

== Photogallery ==
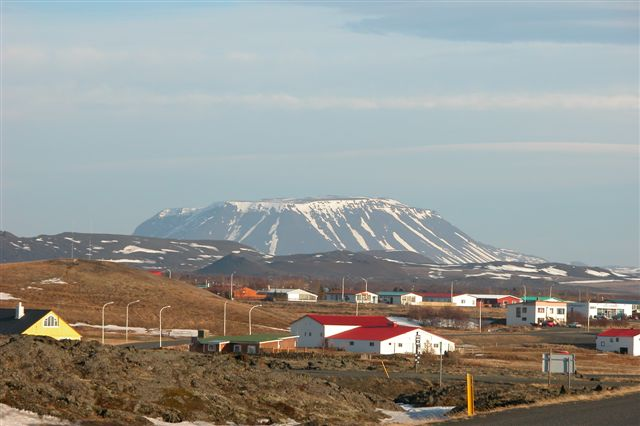
Panoramic view

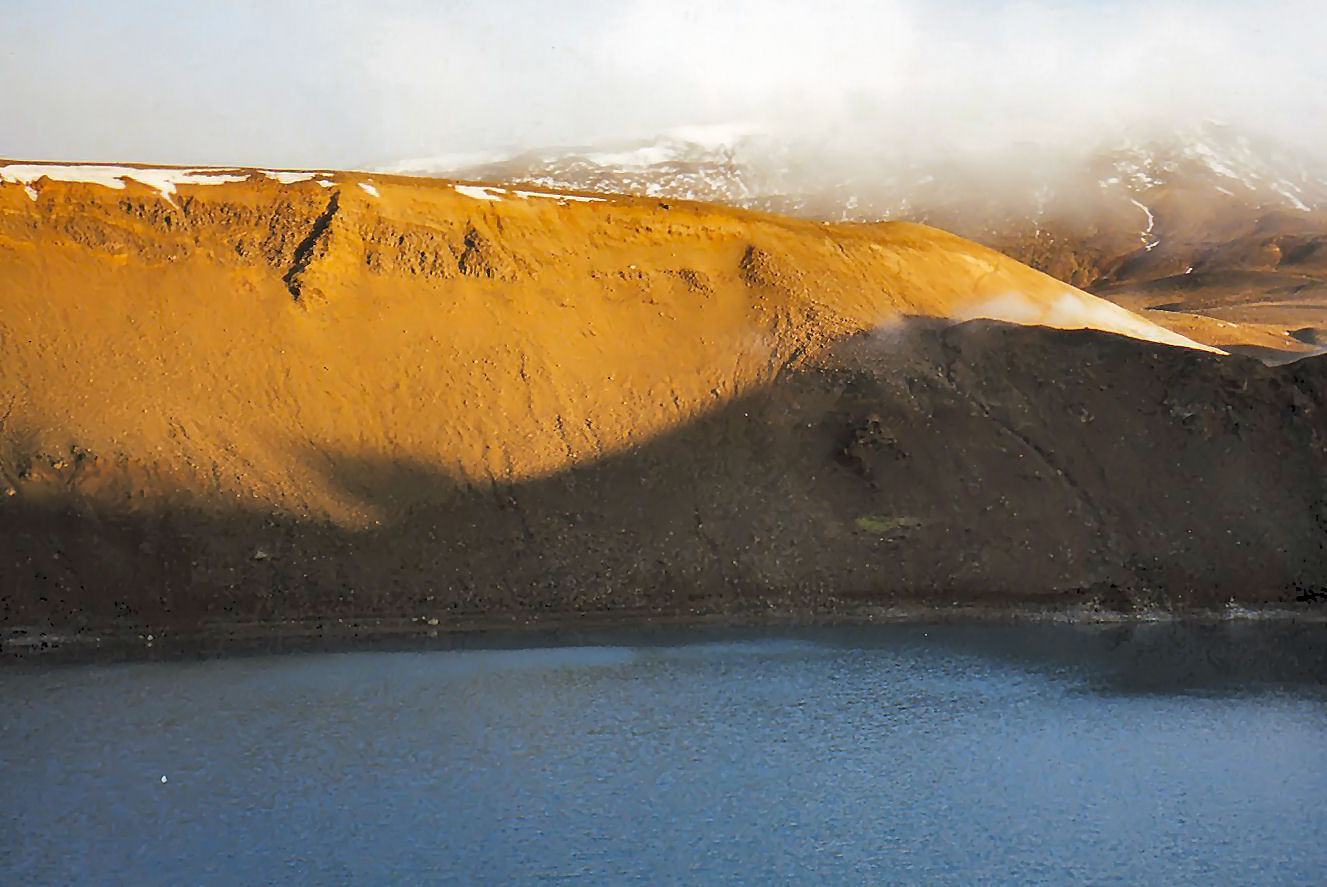
Víti crater

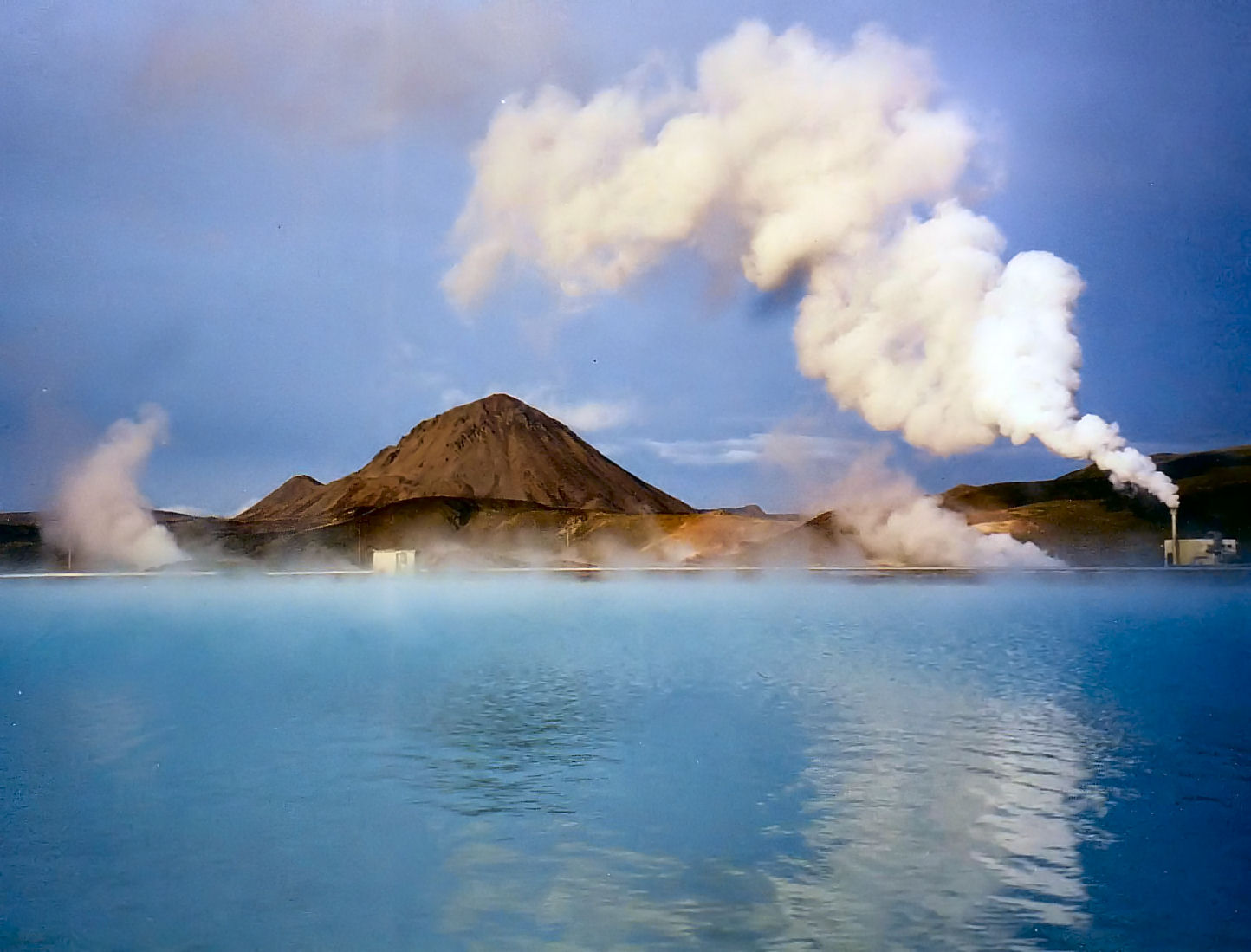
Diatomite plant

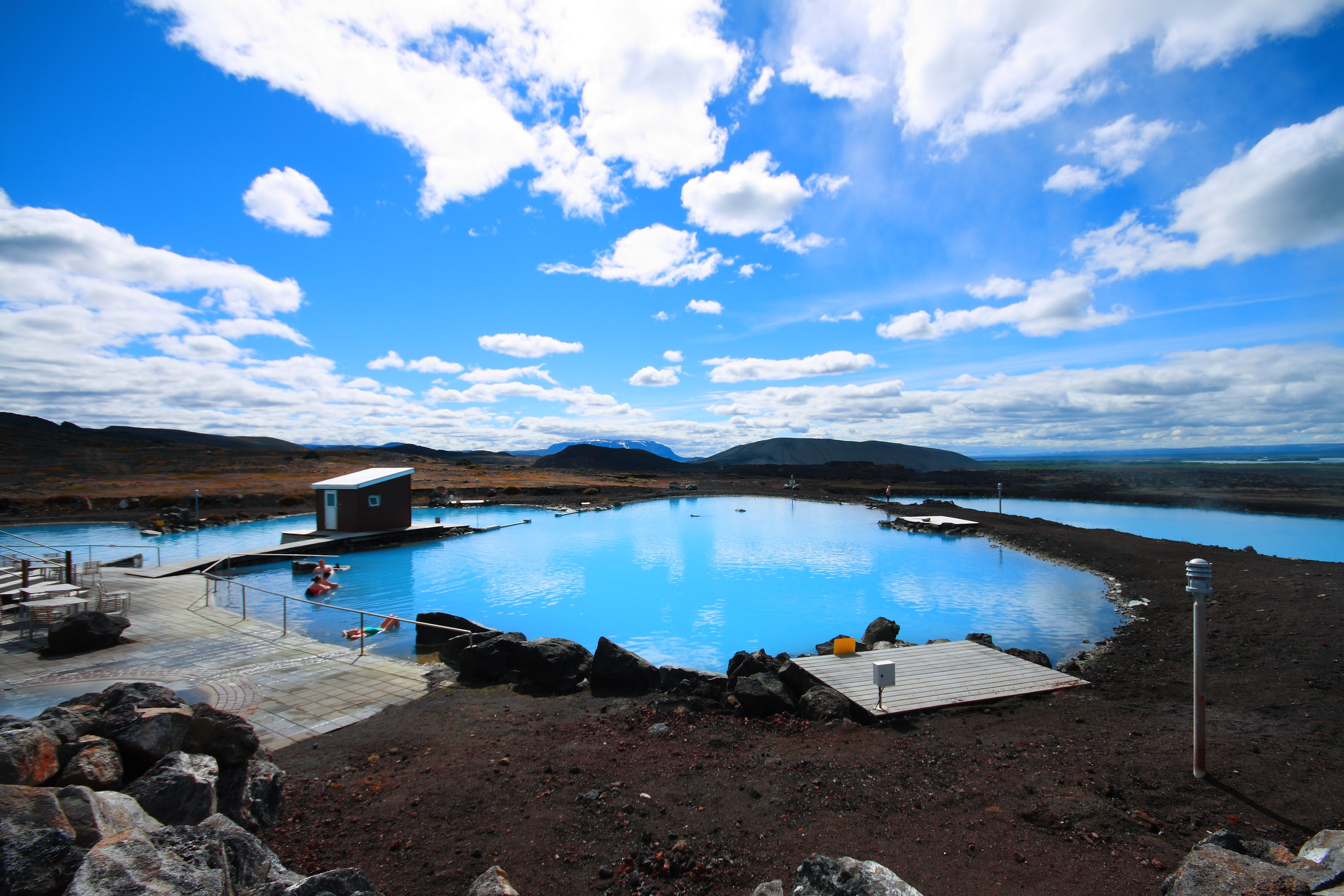
Nature Baths

== See also ==
- Mývatn
- Volcanism of Iceland
