= Martyana =

Scientific classification
- Domain: Eukaryota
- Clade: Diaphoretickes
- Clade: SAR
- Clade: Stramenopiles
- Phylum: Gyrista
- Subphylum: Ochrophytina
- Class: Bacillariophyceae
- Order: Fragilariales
- Family: Fragilariaceae
- Genus: Martyana; Round, 1990

Genus of diatoms

Martyana is a genus of diatom belonging to the family Fragilariaceae.

There are only two accepted species in the genus Martyana:

- Martyana atomus (Hustedt) Snoeijs
- Martyana schulzii (C.Brockmann) Snoeijs
