= Skútustaðahreppur =

- Former municipality
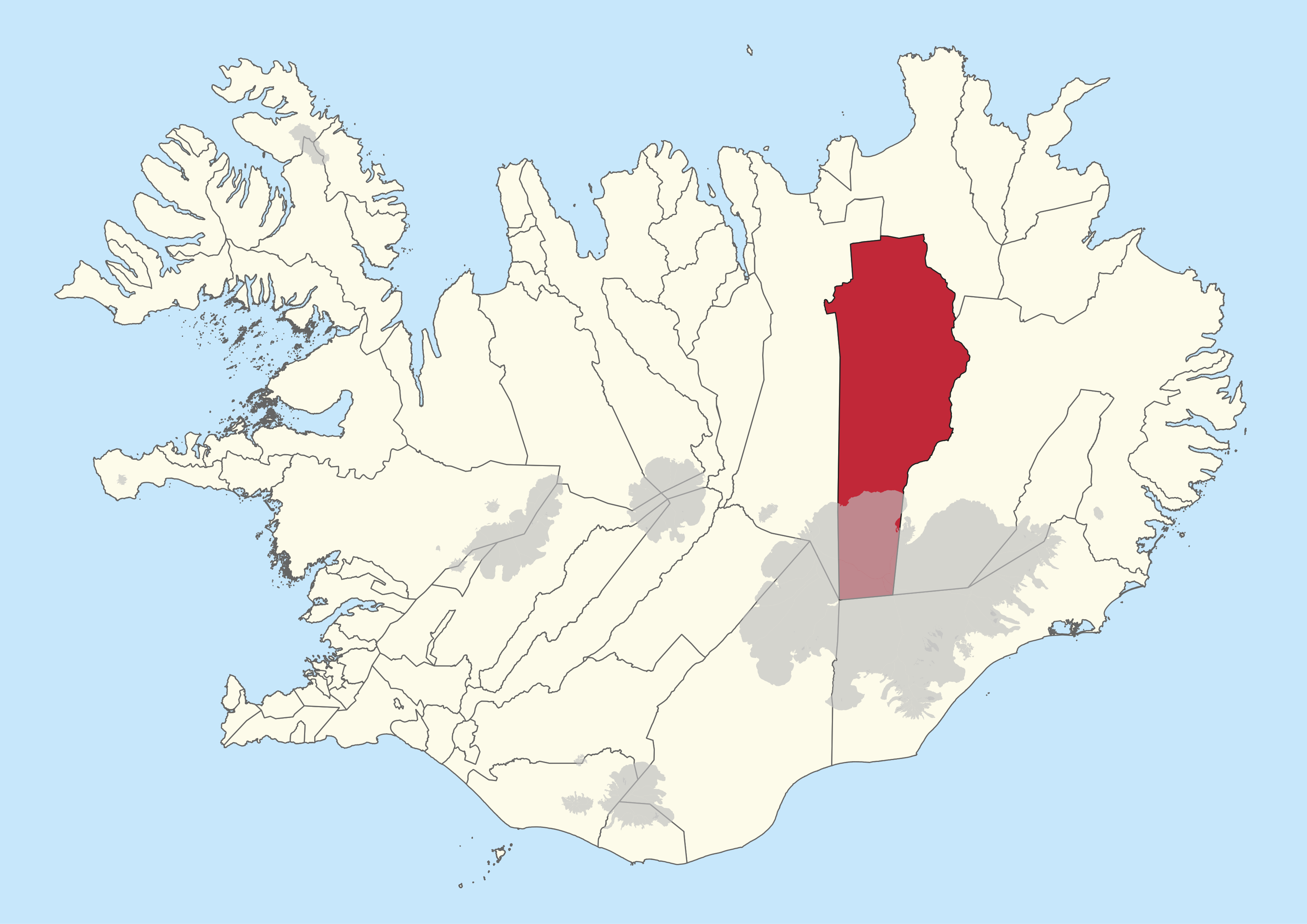
- Location of the municipality

- Location within Iceland
- Coordinates: 65.6436192°N 16.9173658°W
- Country: Iceland
- Region: Northeastern Region
- Constituency: Northeast Constituency
- Municipality: Þingeyjarsveit

Government
  - Manager: Jón Óskar Pétursson

Area
  - Total: 6,036 km^{2} (2,331 sq mi)

Population
  - Total: 399
  - Density: 0.07/km^{2} (0.18/sq mi)
- Postal code(s): 660
- Website: myv.is

Skútustaðahreppur (Icelandic pronunciation: [ˈskuːtʏˌstaːðaˌr̥ɛhpʏr̥], regionally also [ˈskuːtʰʏ-]) is a former rural municipality located in East Iceland, in Northeastern Region. Its seat was in the village of Reykjahlíð. In 2022 the municipality merged with Þingeyjarsveit under the name of the latter.

== Geography ==
Skútustaðir was one of the largest Icelandic municipalities. Its southern borders were represented by the northern site of the glacier of Vatnajökull. Its territory included the lakes of Mývatn (in front of Reykjahlíð) and Öskjuvatn; and the volcanoes of Hverfjall, Askja, Krafla and Herðubreið.

== Gallery ==
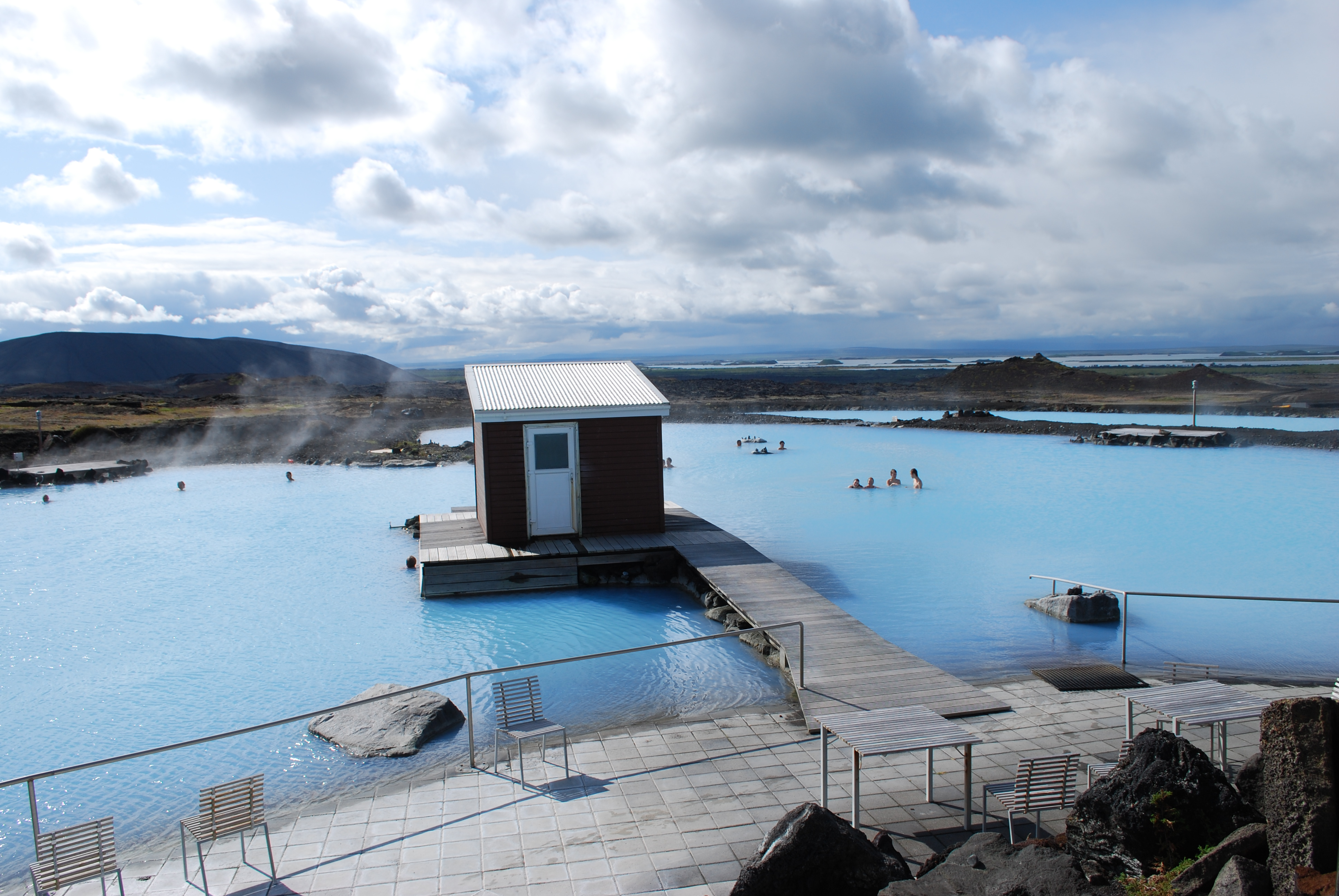
Mývatn Nature Baths

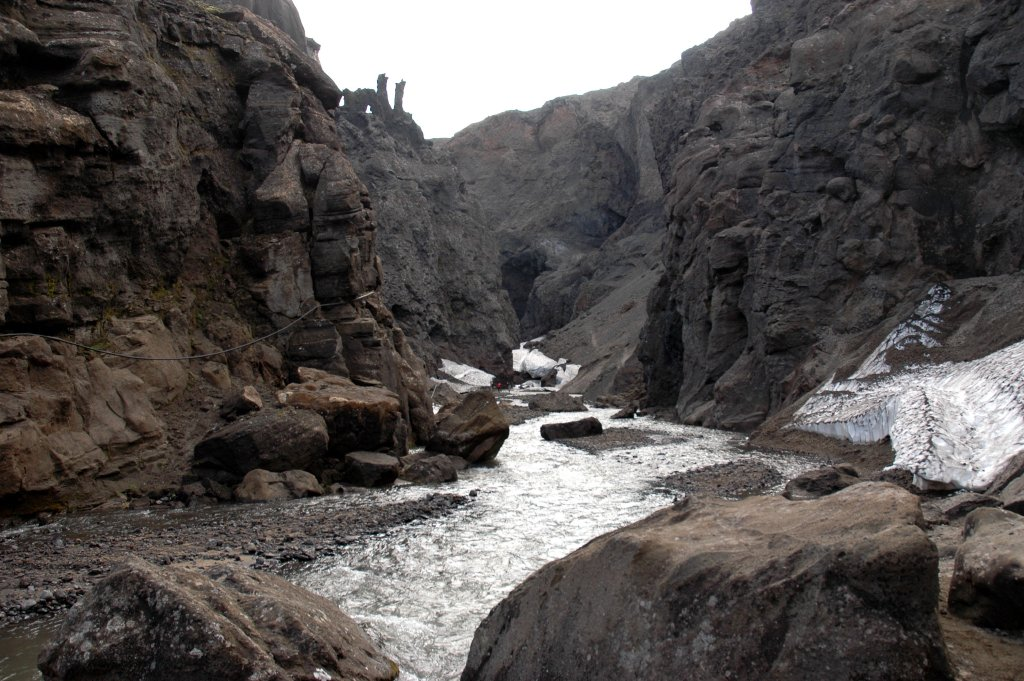
The Drekagil (canyon of dragons) in Askja

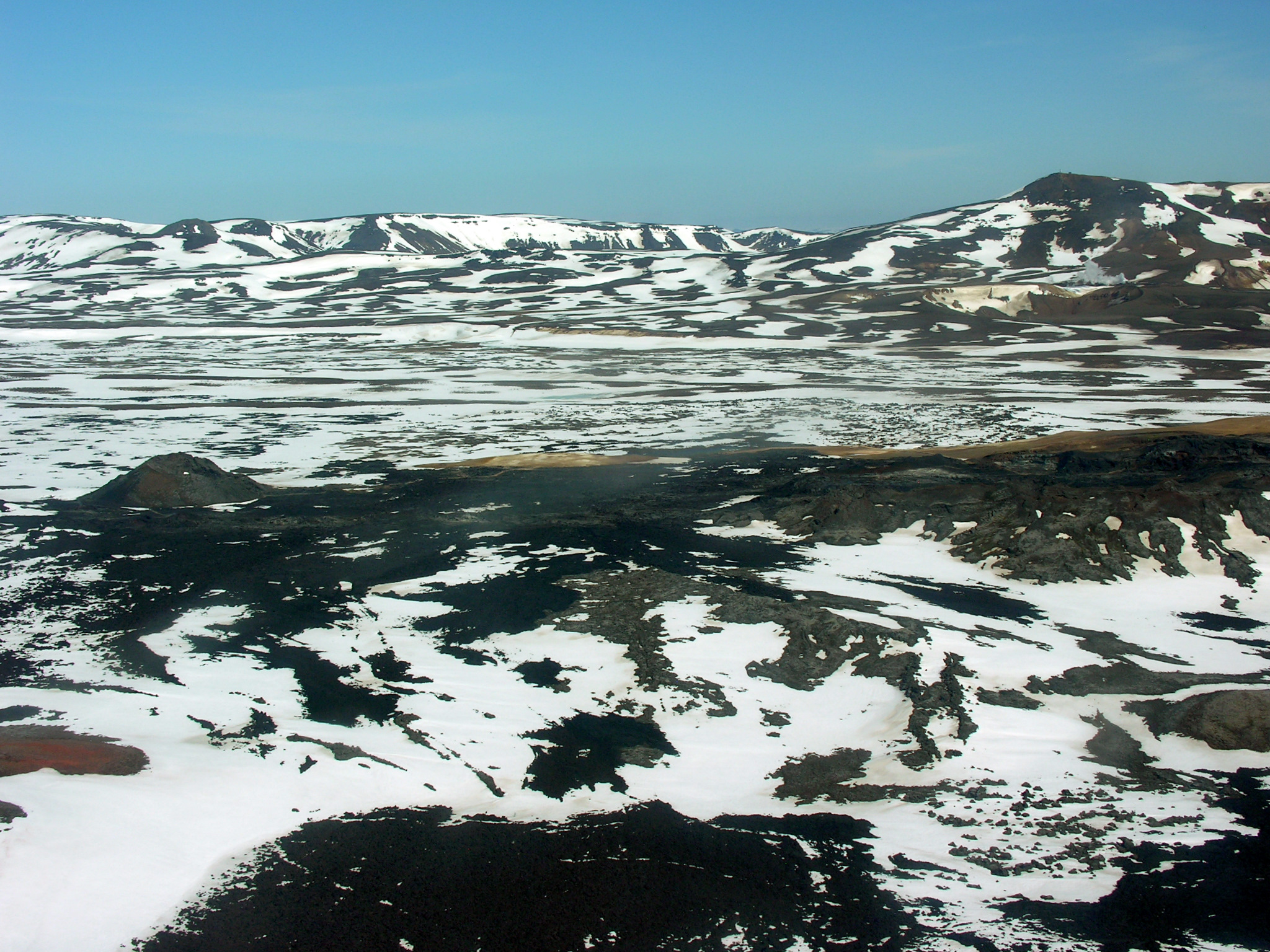
Aerial view of Krafla
