= Fragilaria gracilis =

Scientific classification
- Domain: Eukaryota
- Clade: Sar
- Clade: Stramenopiles
- Division: Ochrophyta
- Clade: Bacillariophyta
- Class: Fragilariophyceae
- Order: Fragilariales
- Family: Fragilariaceae
- Genus: Fragilaria
- Species: F. gracilis

Binomial name
- Fragilaria gracilis (Ostrup, 1910)

Species of single-celled organism

Fragilaria gracilis is a species of freshwater pennate diatoms. F. gracilis is reported from many parts of Europe, in Sweden even as one of the dominant freshwater diatom taxa.

== Identification ==
Despite its frequent occurrence, there has been some confusion about the identification of this taxon. However, a recent study using both molecular and morphological data has shown that F. gracilis is separated from other similar long Fragilaria taxa, and can be identified by both its rbcL barcode, and by using light microscopy (LM). In LM, is can be identified by its quite stable character of almost parallel valve sides (in the long cells) and the clear opposite arrangement of the striae giving the impression of regularly arranged parallel lines across the valve in LM. These characters are also in agreement with Østrup's original description of 1910 of almost linear valves, and Tuji's observation of the type material, describing the striae as “being parallel throughout”, with SEM pictures showing mainly opposite striae.

== Characteristics ==
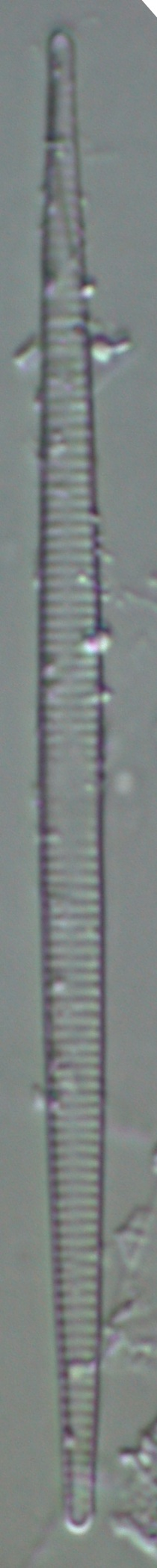
Fragilaria gracilis

The valve shown in the original picture of Østrup (1910, Tab V, Fig. 117) has a length of 43 and a width of 2.1 μm, with 25 striae per 10 μm. The microphotographs from the lectotype slide, coll. Østrup 1342, given in Krammer and Lange-Bertalot (1991) and Tuji (2007), show lengths of 28-54 μm, widths of 2–2.7 μm, and 18–24 striae per 10 μm. Tuji (2007) describes the striae as “being parallel throughout”, with SEM pictures showing opposite striae with some irregular parts where striae are alternate. These alternate parts are however not common, even if Lange-Bertalot and Ulrich (2014) define the striae as “opposite or alternating”. Note that the term “parallel” refers to the orientation of the striae to each other, while the terms “alternate/opposite” refers to whether the striae on either side of the sternum

F. gracilis has been isolated and cultured to clones several times, and the Thonon Culture Collection (TCC) is hosting living strains.
