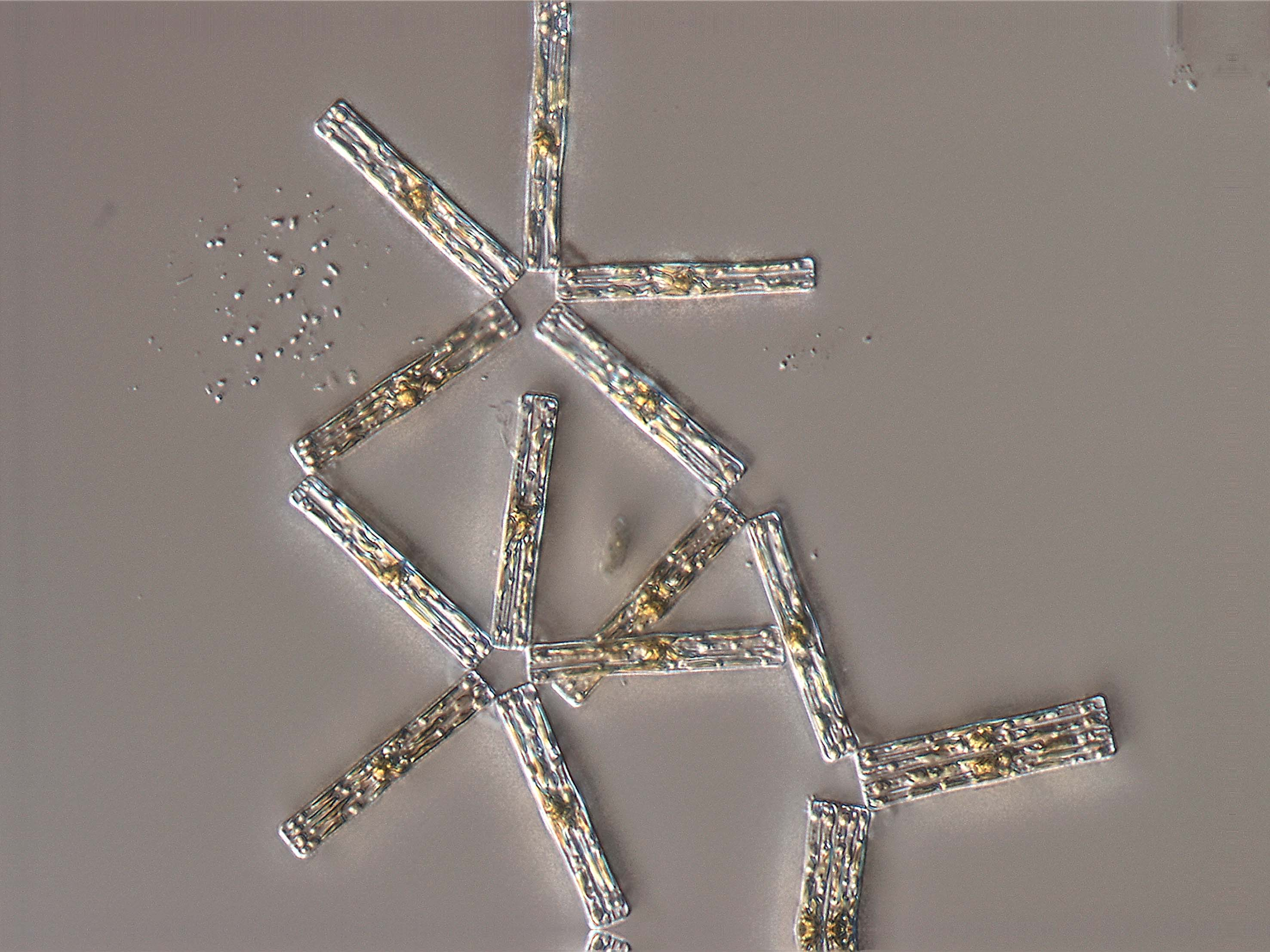
- Tabellaria fenestrata

Scientific classification
- Domain: Eukaryota
- Supergroup: Stramenopiles
- Division: Ochrophyta
- Clade: Bacillariophyta
- Class: Fragilariophyceae
- Order: Tabellariales
- Family: Tabellariaceae
- Genus: Tabellaria; Ehrenberg ex F.T.Kützing

= Tabellaria =

Genus of single-celled organisms

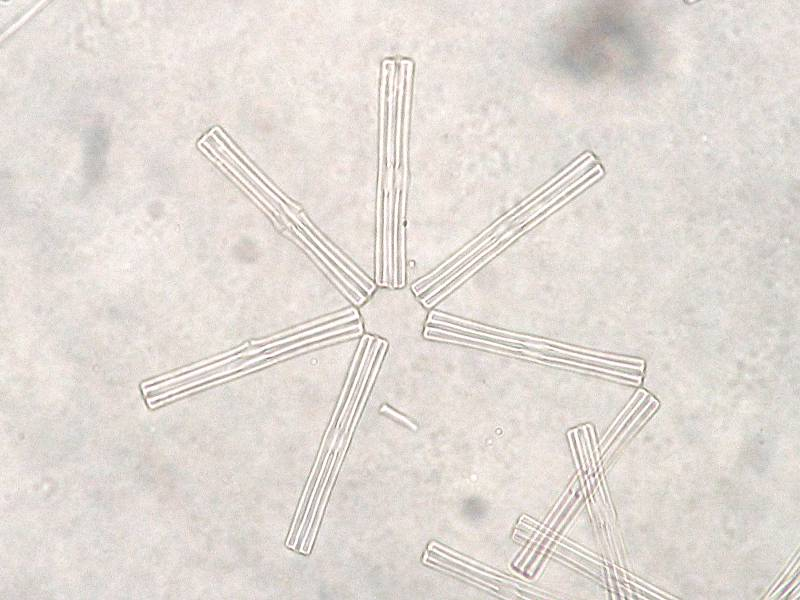
Tabellaria fenestrata

Tabellaria is a genus of freshwater diatoms. They are cuboid in shape, and the frustules (siliceous cell walls) are attached at the corners so that the colonies assume a zigzag shape.
