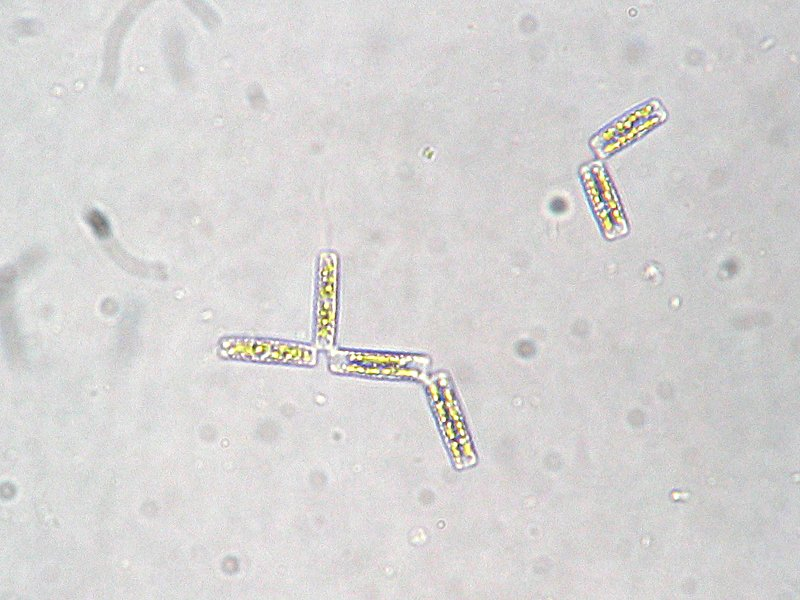
- Diatoma vulgare

Scientific classification
- Domain: Eukaryota
- Clade: Sar
- Clade: Stramenopiles
- Division: Ochrophyta
- Clade: Bacillariophyta
- Class: Fragilariophyceae
- Order: Tabellariales
- Family: Tabellariaceae
- Genus: Diatoma; J.B.M.Bory de Saint-Vincent, 1824

= Diatoma =

Genus of algae

Diatoma is a genus of diatoms belonging to the family Fragilariaceae.

The genus has cosmopolitan distribution.

Species:

- Diatoma angusticostata D.M.Williams & Z.Levkov, 2006
- Diatoma arcuatum Lyngbye, 1818
- Diatoma auritum Lyngbye, 1819
- Diatoma elongata
