= Dimmuborgir =

Area of lava fields in Iceland

Coordinates: 65°35′25″N 16°53′58″W

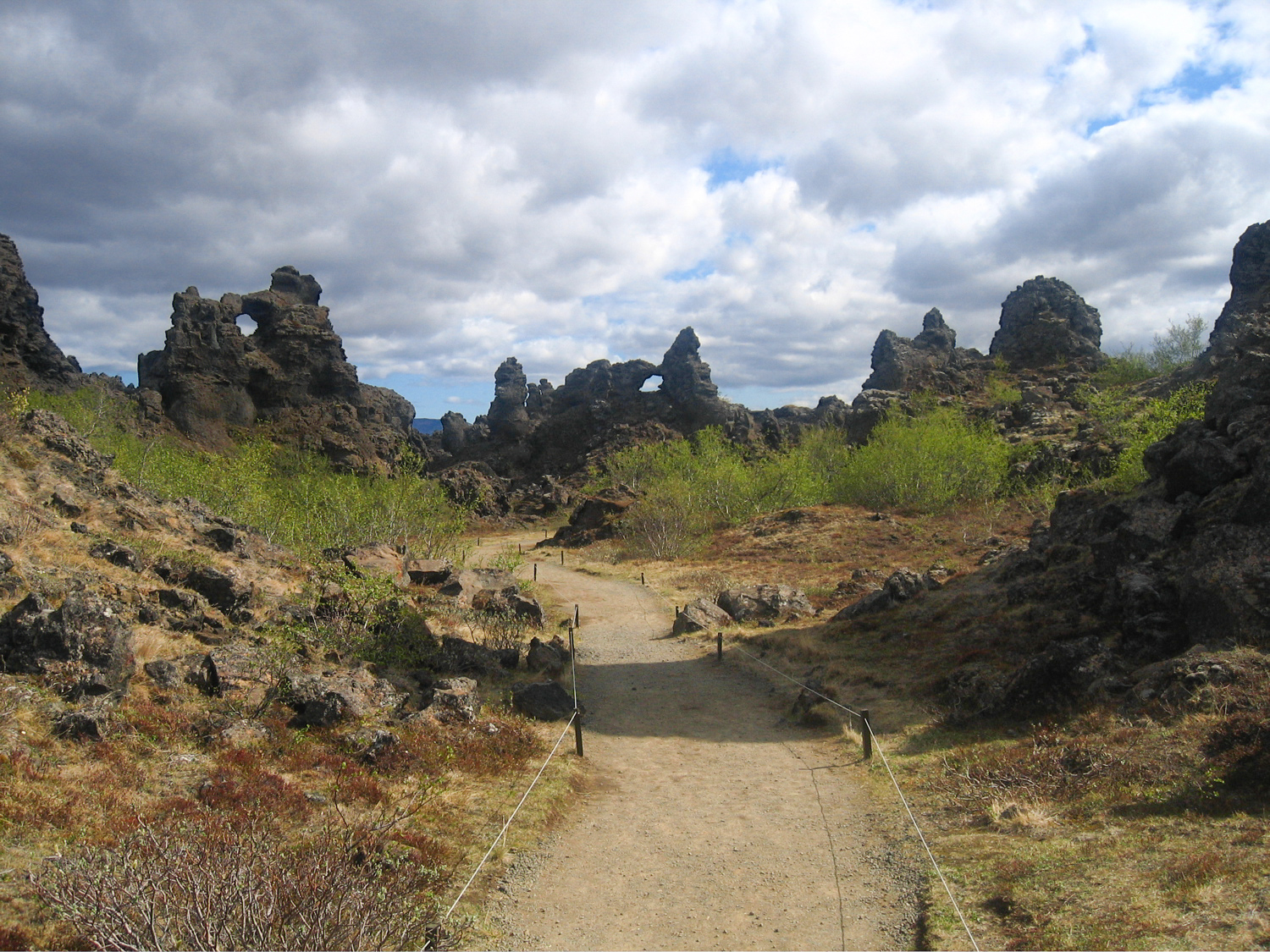
Dimmuborgir, the "Dark Castles"

Dimmuborgir (dimmu "dark", borgir "cities" or "forts", "castles"; pronounced [ˈtɪmːʏˌpɔrcɪr̥]) is a large area of unusually shaped lava fields east of Mývatn in Iceland. The Dimmuborgir area is composed of various volcanic caves and rock formations, reminiscent of an ancient collapsed citadel (hence the name). The dramatic structures are one of Iceland's most popular natural tourist attractions.

== Formation ==
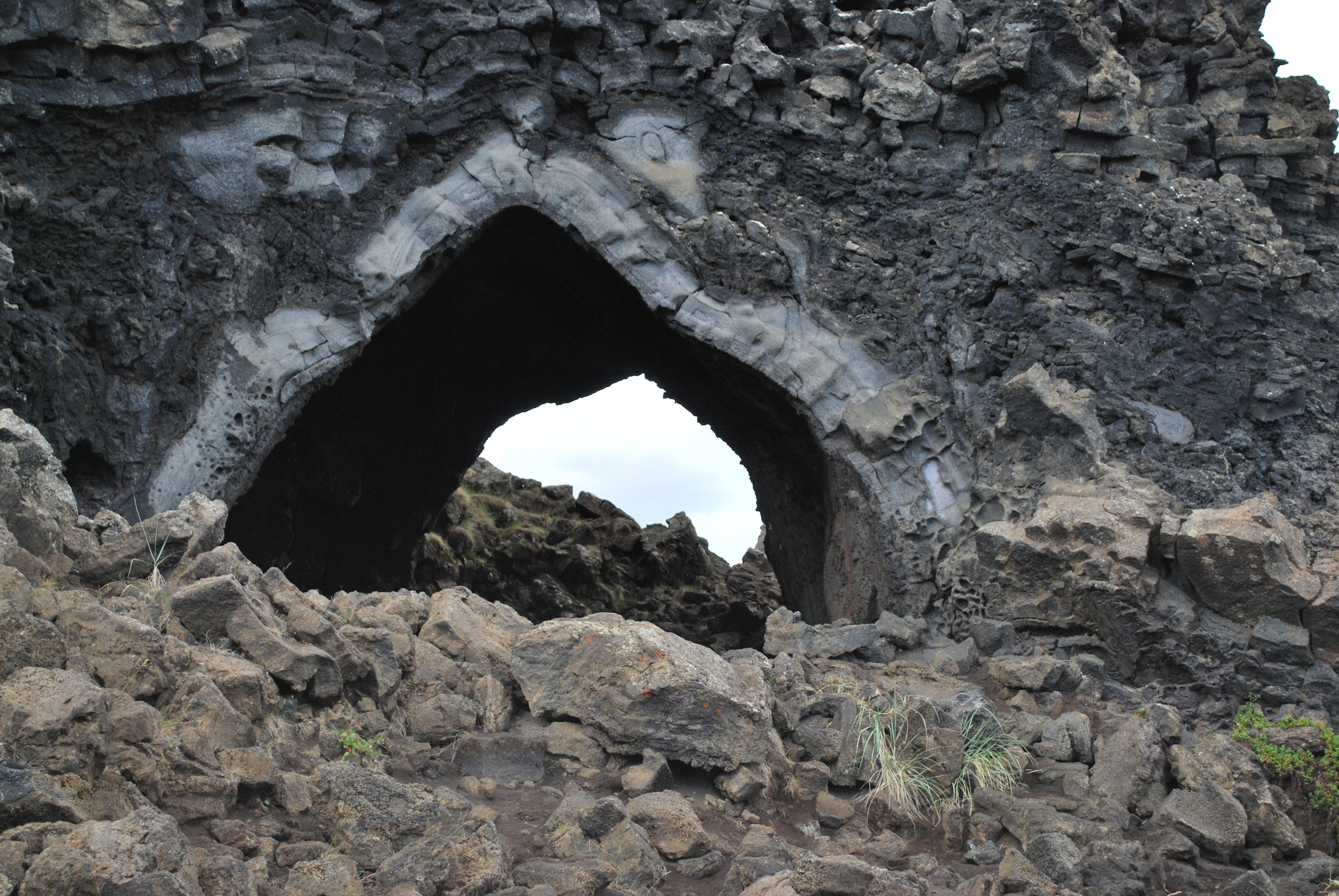
Kirkjan ("the Church"), lava tube structure at Dimmuborgir

The Dimmuborgir area consists of a massive, collapsed lava tube formed by a lava lake flowing in from a large eruption in the Þrengslaborgir and Lúdentsborgir crater row to the East, about 2300 years ago. At Dimmuborgir, the lava pooled over a small lake. As the lava flowed across the wet sod, the water of the marsh started to boil, the vapour rising through the lava forming lava pillars from drainpipe size up to several meters in diameter. As the lava continued flowing towards lower ground in the Mývatn area, the top crust collapsed, but the hollow pillars of solidified lava remained. The lava lake must have been at least 10 meters deep, as estimated by the tallest structures still standing.

The lava flow surface remains partly intact around the Dimmuborgir area, so that the Dimmuborgir itself sits below the surrounding surface area. The area is characterised by large hollow cell- or chamber-like structures formed around bubbles of vapour, and some dramatically standing lava pillars. Several of the chambers and pillar bases are large enough to house humans, giving rise to the term "castles" (borgir).

== Dimmuborgir in culture ==
In Icelandic folklore, Dimmuborgir is said to connect earth with the infernal regions. In Nordic Christian lore, it is also said that Dimmuborgir is the place where Satan landed when he was cast from the heavens and created the apparent "Helvetes katakomber" which is Norwegian for "The Catacombs of Hell".

Dimmuborgir was used as a shooting location for HBO's fantasy TV-series Game of Thrones. Dimmuborgir forms the background of Mance Rayder's wildling camp.

The Norwegian symphonic black metal band Dimmu Borgir is named after the Dimmuborgir region.
