= Climacosphenia elegans =

Scientific classification
- Domain: Eukaryota
- Clade: Sar
- Clade: Stramenopiles
- Division: Ochrophyta
- Clade: Bacillariophyta
- Class: Thalassiosirophyceae
- Order: Ardissoneales
- Family: Ardissoneaceae
- Genus: Climacosphenia
- Species: C. elegans

Binomial name
- Climacosphenia elegans Mereschkowsky

Species of single-celled organism

Climacosphenia elegans is a species of marine pennate diatoms in the order Climacospheniales.
