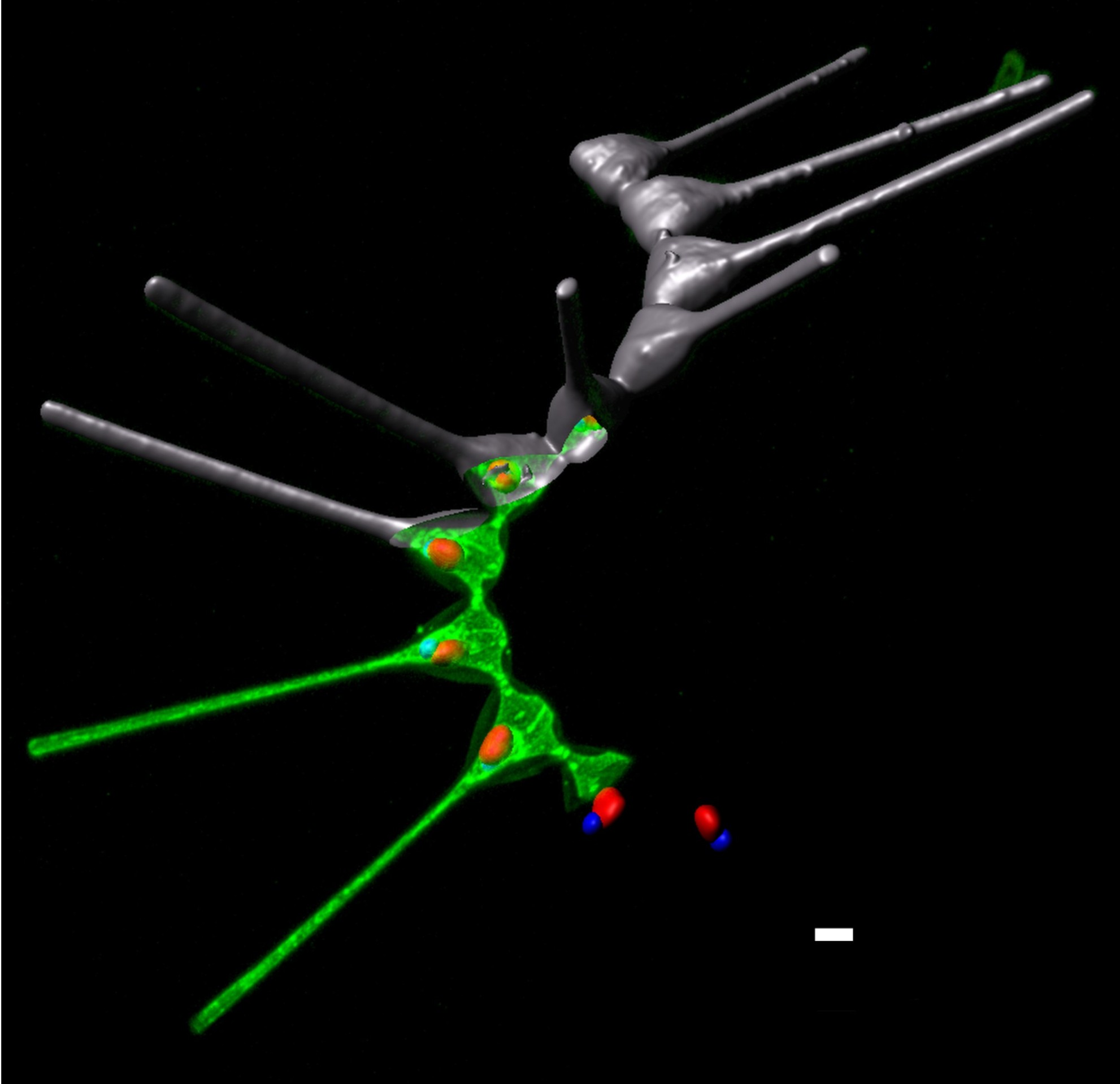
- Environmental high-content fluorescence microscopy (e-HCFM) image of a chain of Asterionellopsis sp. diatoms. Scale bar 5 µm

Scientific classification
- Domain: Eukaryota
- Supergroup: Stramenopiles
- Division: Ochrophyta
- Clade: Bacillariophyta
- Class: Plagiogrammaphyceae
- Order: Rhaphoneidales
- Family: Asterionellopsidaceae

= Asterionellopsidaceae =

Family of algae

Asterionellopsidaceae is a family of diatoms belonging to the order Rhaphoneidales.

Genera:

- Asterionellopsis
- Asteroplanus
- Bleakeleya
