= Fragilariforma =

Scientific classification
- Domain: Eukaryota
- Clade: Sar
- Clade: Stramenopiles
- Division: Ochrophyta
- Clade: Bacillariophyta
- Class: Fragilariophyceae
- Order: Staurosirales
- Family: Staurosiraceae
- Genus: Fragilariforma; Williams and Round, 1988

Extant species
- See text

Genus of diatoms

Fragilariforma is a genus of diatoms belonging to the family Fragilariaceae.

The genus was first described by D. M. Williams and Round in 1988.

The genus has cosmopolitan distribution.

Species:

- Fragilariforma bicapitata
- Fragilariforma neoproducta
- Fragilariforma virescens
- Fragilariforma virescens
