= Asteroplanus =

Scientific classification
- Domain: Eukaryota
- Clade: Diaphoretickes
- Clade: SAR
- Clade: Stramenopiles
- Phylum: Gyrista
- Subphylum: Ochrophytina
- Class: Bacillariophyceae
- Order: Rhaphoneidales
- Family: Asterionellopsidaceae
- Genus: Asteroplanus; C.Gardner & R.M.Crawford, 1997

Genus of diatoms

Asteroplanus is a genus of diatoms belonging to the family Asterionellopsidaceae.

Species:

- Asteroplanus karianus (Grunow) C.Gardner & R.M.Crawford
