= Hverfjall =

Volcano in northern Iceland

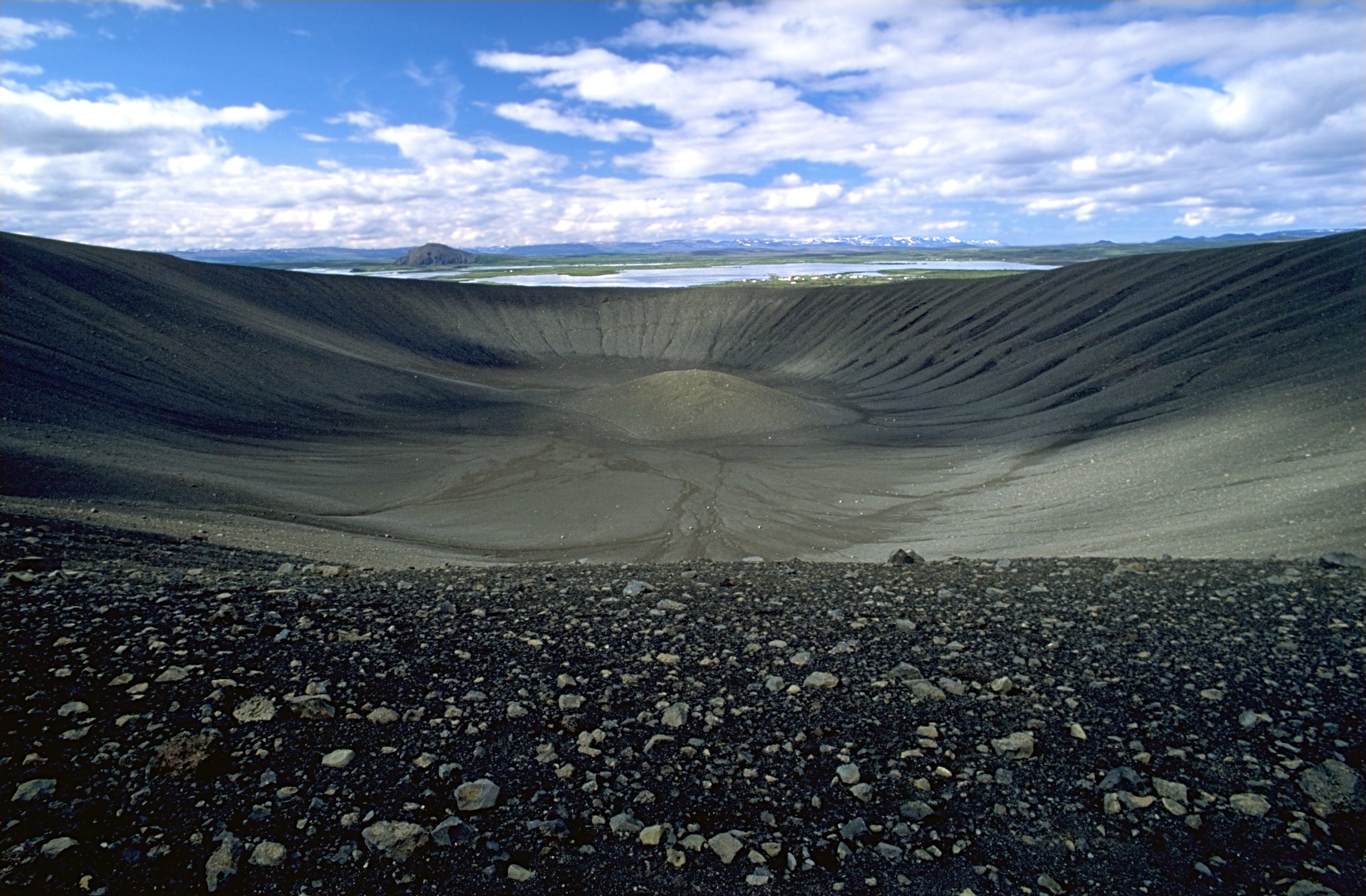
- The Hverfjall crater from the south

Highest point
- Elevation: 420 m (1,380 ft)
- Coordinates: 65°36′00″N 16°53′00″W

Geography
- Location: Iceland

Geology
- Mountain type(s): Tephra cone, tuff ring volcano
- Last eruption: 2500 BP

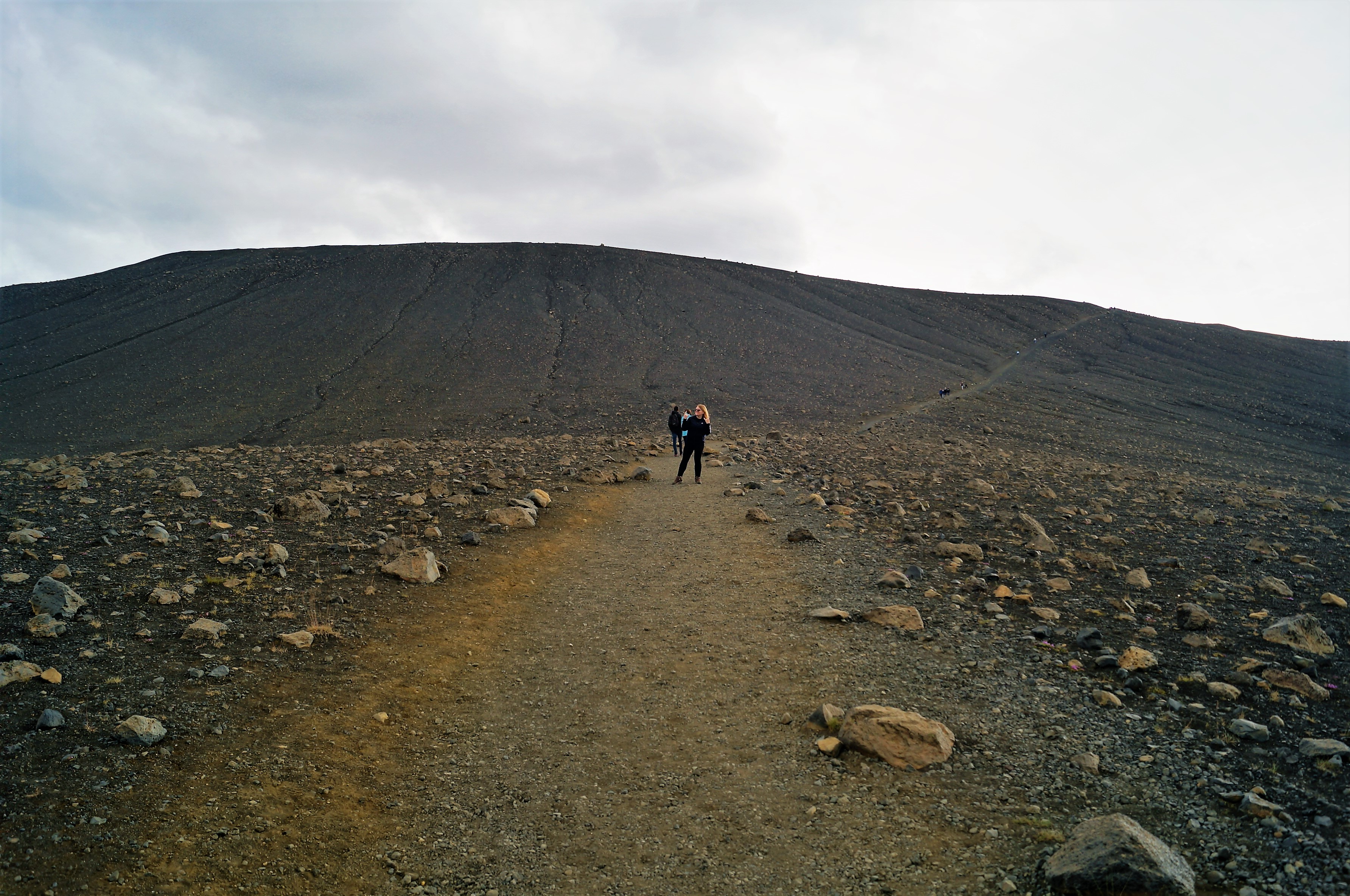
Trails to Hverfjall

Hverfjall (Icelandic pronunciation: [ˈkʰvɛrˌfjatl̥]; also known as Hverfell [ˈkʰvɛrˌfɛtl̥]) is a tephra cone or tuff ring volcano in northern Iceland, to the east of Mývatn.

It erupted in 2500 BP in the southern part of the Krafla fissure swarm. The crater is approximately 1 km in diameter.

Tephra has been carried from Hverfjall all over the Mývatn area. A landslide apparently occurred in the south part of the crater during the eruption, which accounts for the disruption to the round shape of the mountain. During the Age of Settlement, lava flowed from Svörtuborgir [ˈsvœr̥tʏˌpɔrcɪr̥], at the southern end of Námafjall [ˈnauːmaˌfjatl̥], around Hverfjall, which was nearly engulfed by the lava. At the same time an eruption occurred in the slopes above the valley of Hlíðardalur [ˈl̥iːðarˌtaːlʏr̥].

The rim of the crater is only accessible by two paths, from the northwest and south. It is strictly forbidden to use other routes in ascent or descent.

== See also ==
- Volcanism of Iceland
  - List of volcanic eruptions in Iceland
  - List of volcanoes in Iceland
