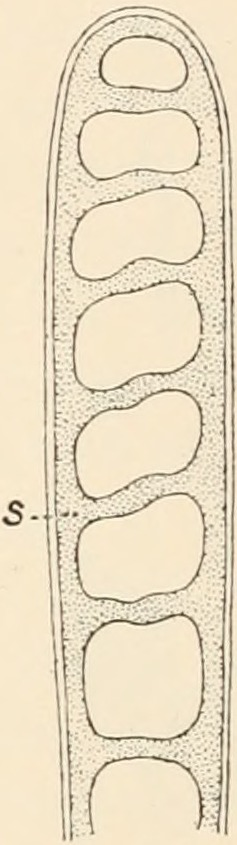
- Climacosphenia moniligera, section of upper portion of cell to show the perforated septum (s). By George Stephen West after O. Müller.

Scientific classification
- Domain: Eukaryota
- Clade: Diaphoretickes
- Clade: SAR
- Clade: Stramenopiles
- Phylum: Gyrista
- Subphylum: Ochrophytina
- Class: Bacillariophyceae
- Order: Climacospheniales
- Family: Climacospheniaceae
- Genus: Climacosphenia; Ehrenberg, 1841

Species
- Climacosphenia australis Kützing, 1844; Climacosphenia catena Shaboldt; Climacosphenia elegans Mereschkowsky; Climacosphenia elongata Mereschkowsky; Climacosphenia moniligera Ehrenberg, 1843; Climacosphenia siciliana Mereschkowsky; Climacosphenia truncata Hustedt ex Simonsen Mereschkowsky

= Climacosphenia =

Genus of single-celled organisms

Climacosphenia is a genus of marine pennate diatoms in the order Climacospheniales.
