= Mývatn =

Lake in Iceland

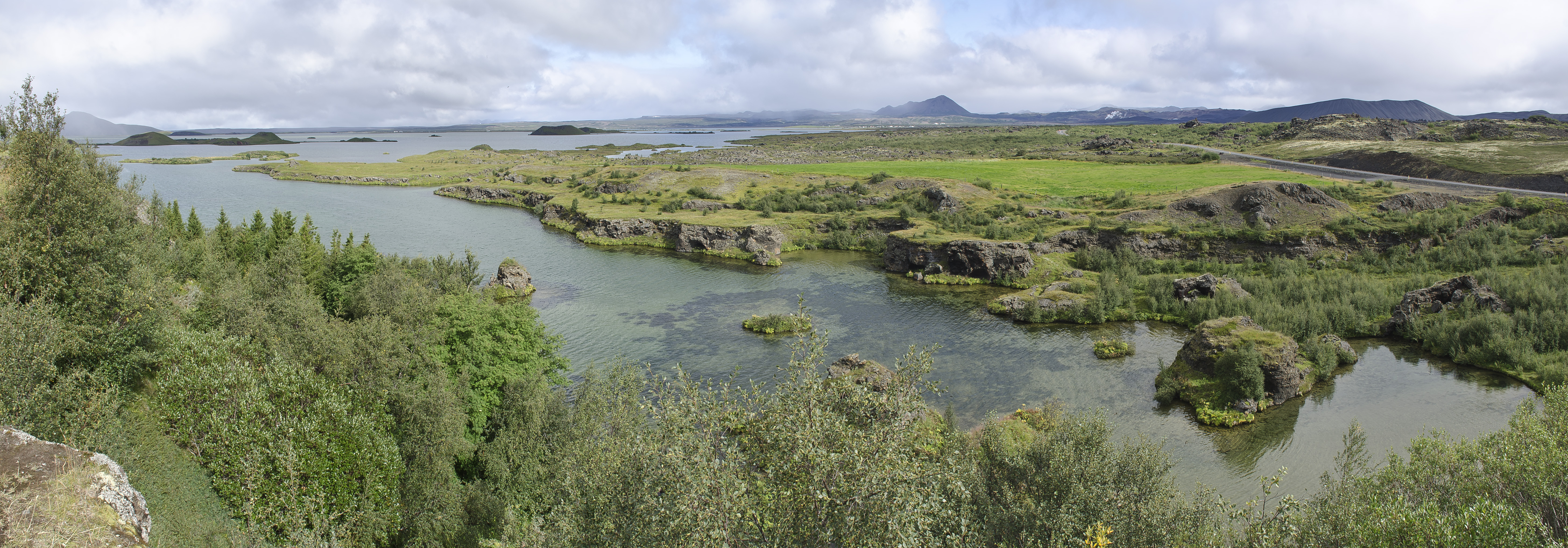
- Mývatn, near Höfði Nature Park

- Location within Iceland
- Coordinates: 65°36′N 17°00′W
- Lake type: Volcanogenic, eutrophic
- Primary outflows: Laxá
- Basin countries: Iceland
- Surface area: 37 km^{2} (14 sq mi)
- Average depth: 2.5 m (8 ft 2 in)
- Max. depth: 4.5 m (15 ft)
- Surface elevation: 288 m (945 ft)

Ramsar Wetland
- Official name: Myvatn-Laxá region
- Designated: 2 December 1977
- Reference no.: 167

Mývatn (Icelandic pronunciation: [ˈmiːˌvahtn̥]) is a shallow lake situated in an area of active volcanism in the north of Iceland, near Krafla volcano. It has a high amount of biological activity. The lake and the surrounding wetlands provide a habitat for a number of waterbirds, especially ducks. The lake was created by a large basaltic lava eruption 2300 years ago, and the surrounding landscape is dominated by volcanic landforms, including lava pillars and rootless vents (pseudocraters). The effluent river Laxá [ˈlaksˌauː] is known for its rich fishing for brown trout and Atlantic salmon.

The name of the lake (Icelandic mý ("midge") and vatn ("lake"); "the lake of midges") comes from the large numbers of midges present in the summer.

The name Mývatn is sometimes used not only for the lake but the whole surrounding inhabited area. The river Laxá, the lake Mývatn and the surrounding wetlands are protected as a nature reserve (the Mývatn–Laxá Nature Conservation Area), which occupies 4,400 km^{2} (440,000 ha).

Since 2000, a marathon around the lake has taken place in the summer.

== Geography ==
The lake has an average depth of 2.5 metres and a maximum depth of 4.5 metres.

=== Climate ===
The Mývatn area features a tundra climate (Köppen climate classification ET), bordering on a subarctic climate (Köppen climate classification Dfc). Summers are typically cool with crisp nights while winters are very long and cold.

Climate data for Reykjahlíð (1961–1990)
Month	Jan	Feb	Mar	Apr	May	Jun	Jul	Aug	Sep	Oct	Nov	Dec	Year
Record high °C (°F)	9.4 (48.9)	10.5 (50.9)	10.9 (51.6)	15.7 (60.3)	23.3 (73.9)	25.6 (78.1)	24.0 (75.2)	24.0 (75.2)	19.0 (66.2)	15.2 (59.4)	11.0 (51.8)	10.6 (51.1)	25.6 (78.1)
Mean daily maximum °C (°F)	−1.8 (28.8)	−0.9 (30.4)	−0.3 (31.5)	3.0 (37.4)	7.6 (45.7)	12.3 (54.1)	14.2 (57.6)	12.9 (55.2)	8.1 (46.6)	3.6 (38.5)	0.0 (32.0)	−1.4 (29.5)	4.8 (40.6)
Daily mean °C (°F)	−4.8 (23.4)	−4.1 (24.6)	−3.5 (25.7)	−0.3 (31.5)	4.0 (39.2)	8.3 (46.9)	9.9 (49.8)	9.0 (48.2)	4.8 (40.6)	1.2 (34.2)	−2.7 (27.1)	−4.5 (23.9)	1.4 (34.5)
Mean daily minimum °C (°F)	−8.4 (16.9)	−7.6 (18.3)	−7.2 (19.0)	−3.9 (25.0)	0.6 (33.1)	4.5 (40.1)	6.4 (43.5)	5.6 (42.1)	1.9 (35.4)	−1.6 (29.1)	−6.1 (21.0)	−8.0 (17.6)	−2.0 (28.4)
Record low °C (°F)	−30.5 (−22.9)	−26.6 (−15.9)	−30.9 (−23.6)	−25.7 (−14.3)	−16.1 (3.0)	−5.0 (23.0)	−1.6 (29.1)	−2.0 (28.4)	−11.5 (11.3)	−17.1 (1.2)	−26.0 (−14.8)	−27.5 (−17.5)	−30.9 (−23.6)
Average precipitation mm (inches)	33.4 (1.31)	26.2 (1.03)	32.5 (1.28)	25.4 (1.00)	20.1 (0.79)	32.3 (1.27)	47.4 (1.87)	45.6 (1.80)	44.1 (1.74)	46.2 (1.82)	43.4 (1.71)	38.0 (1.50)	435.0 (17.13)
Average precipitation days (≥ 1.0 mm)	8.2	6.5	8.2	6.8	5.1	7.0	8.9	8.2	8.1	9.9	9.7	9.9	96.8
Mean monthly sunshine hours	16.1	51.6	96.5	147.7	178.2	202.5	170.3	157.4	97.8	57.8	23.8	3.7	1,203.4
Source 1: Icelandic Met Office
Source 2: Icelandic Met Office (monthly sunshine hours 1981–2010 for Haganes-9 km (5.6 mi) from Reykjahlíð)

== Flora and fauna ==
=== Birds ===
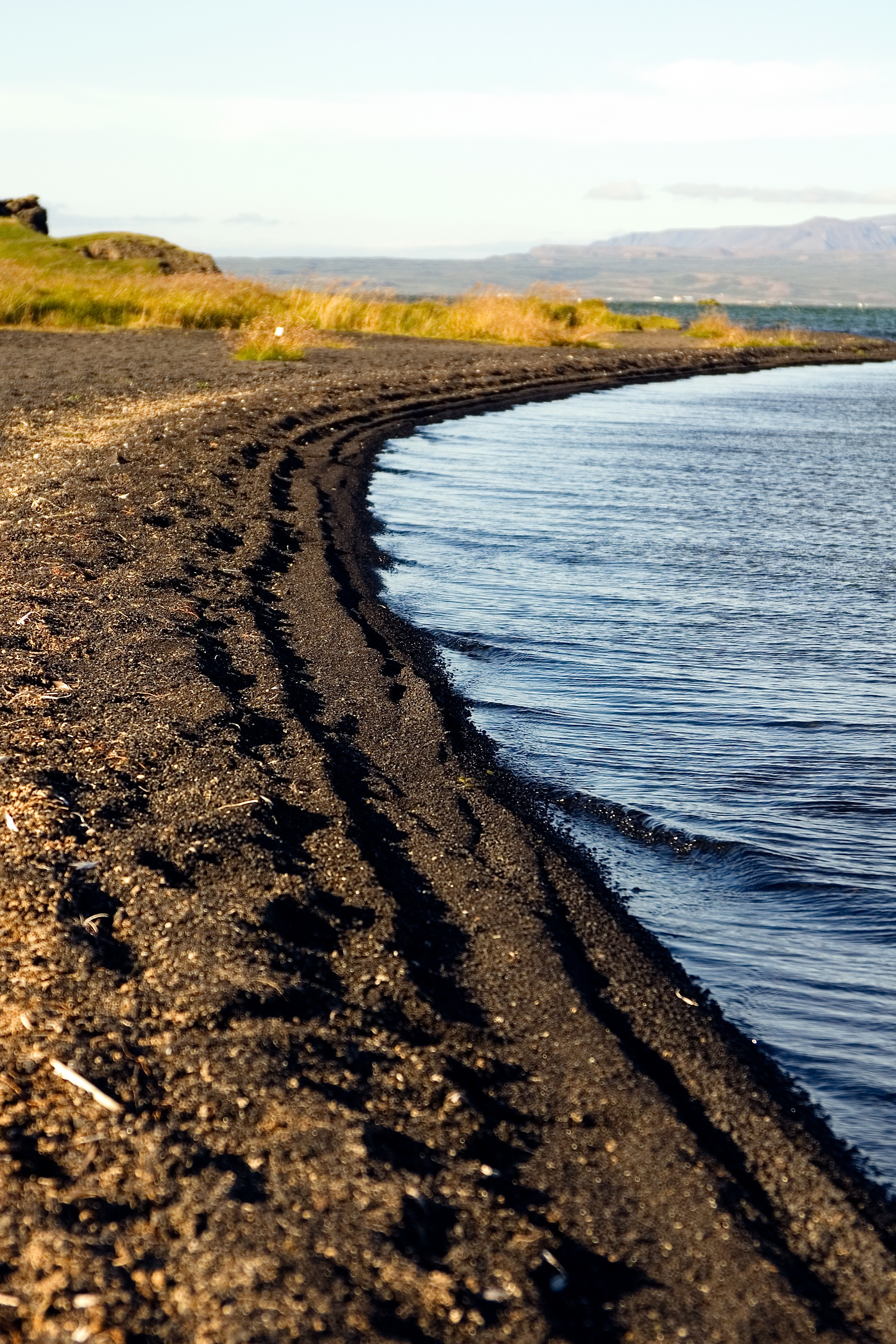
Shore of Mývatn.

The lake is fed by nutrient-rich springwater and has a high abundance of aquatic insects (Chironomidae) and Cladocera that form an attractive food supply for ducks. Fifteen species of ducks breed at the site, the largest such number in Europe. The duck species composition has a mixture of European and North American species, and also of boreal and arctic species. Most of the ducks are migratory, arriving in late April to early May from north-western Europe. The commonest species at the lake is the tufted duck with 6,000 pairs present, whilst the second most abundant species is the greater scaup with 1,500 pairs.

Other common species include the Barrow's goldeneye, 700 pairs of red-breasted merganser, 1000 pairs of Eurasian wigeon, around 300 pairs of gadwall, 200 pairs of mallard, around 350 pairs of common scoter, 150 pairs of long-tailed duck and 75 pairs of Eurasian teal. The northern shoveler and northern pintail also regularly breed at the lake, albeit in smaller numbers, whilst common pochard used to breed regularly, but they have not done so regularly since the 1950s. The outflowing Laxá river contains around 250 pairs of harlequin duck and there is a large colony of eider at the river mouth some 50 km away from Mývatn. The Barrow's goldeneye and the harlequin duck are both nearctic duck species. The population of the Barrow's goldeneye (of about 2000 individuals) relies entirely on the habitat provided by the Mývatn Laxá water system and its surrounding lava fields. Most of the Barrow's goldeneyes overwinter there, using ice-free areas kept open by emerging spring water (both warm and cold) and in the strong river current. This species is a hole-nester, in North America using tree-holes, but at Mývatn the birds use cavities in the lava for nesting. The other duck species nest abundantly in the numerous islands of the lake and the surrounding marshlands.

Other common waterbirds include the Slavonian grebe, red-necked phalarope, great northern diver, red-throated diver and whooper swan. The lake is included in an important bird area.

Bird populations have been monitored annually since 1975 by the Mývatn Research Station. There is a long tradition of harvesting duck eggs for home use on the local farms. To ensure sustainability, the harvesting follows strict age-old rules of leaving at least four eggs in a nest for the duck to incubate.

The lava flows and moorlands surrounding the lake are home to rock ptarmigans and occasionally gyr falcons may be present.

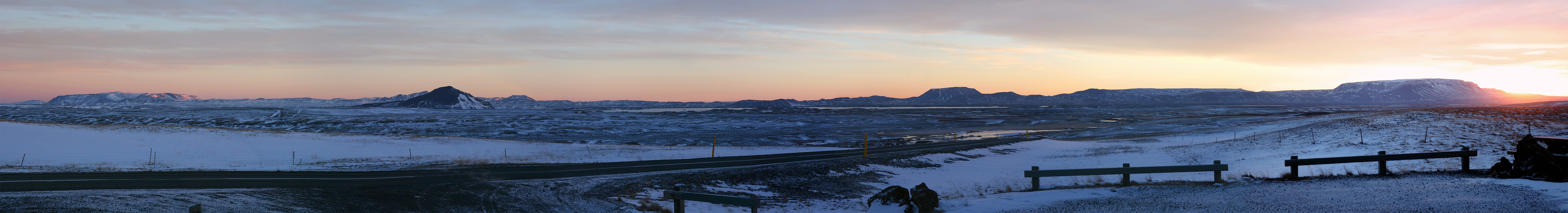
The plateau surrounding Mývatn. In the distance are Gæsafjöll (882m, left), Krafla (818m, centre-left, behind the dark Vindbelgur (529m)), Hverfjall (caldera at centre), Búrfell (953m, centre-right), and Bláfjall (1222m, right).

=== Plants ===
Mývatn is one of the few places in the world where marimo grows naturally. Also known as Cladophora ball it is a species of filamentous green algae. Due to environmental factors their population has rapidly declined and the algae appeared to have become extinct in 2013. The ecosystem is now improving and small marimo balls are forming again.

== Volcanism ==
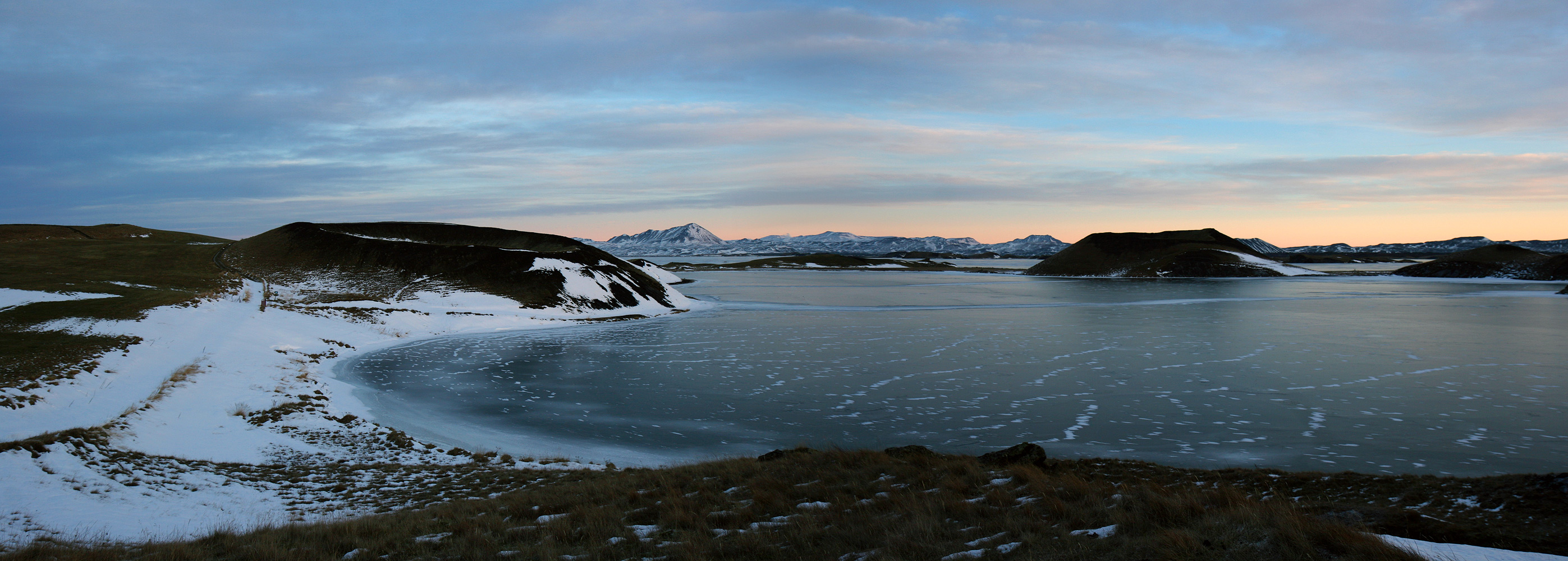
Panorama of Mývatn from the town of Skútustaðir, November 2007

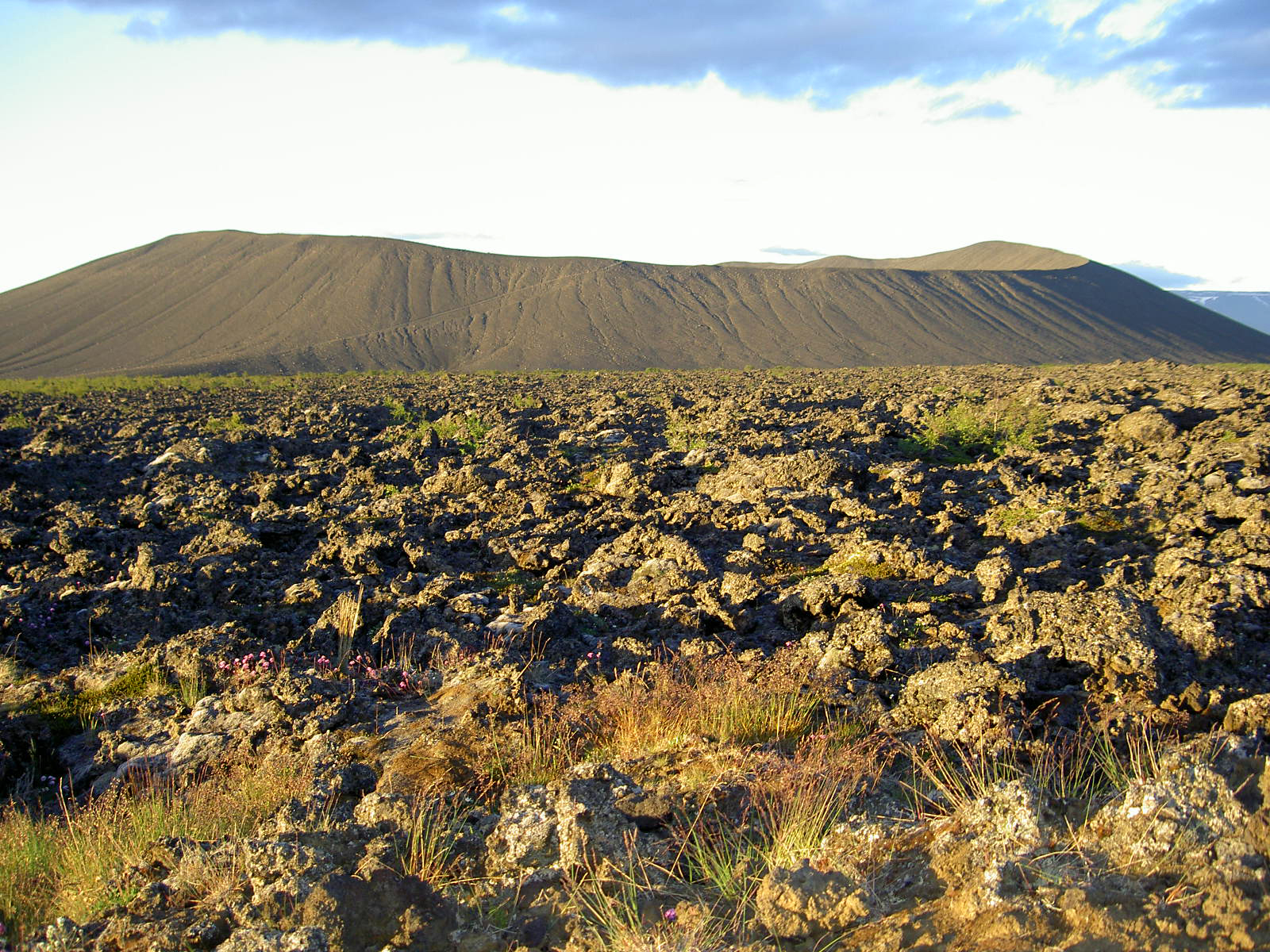
The Hverfjall crater, immediately east of Mývatn

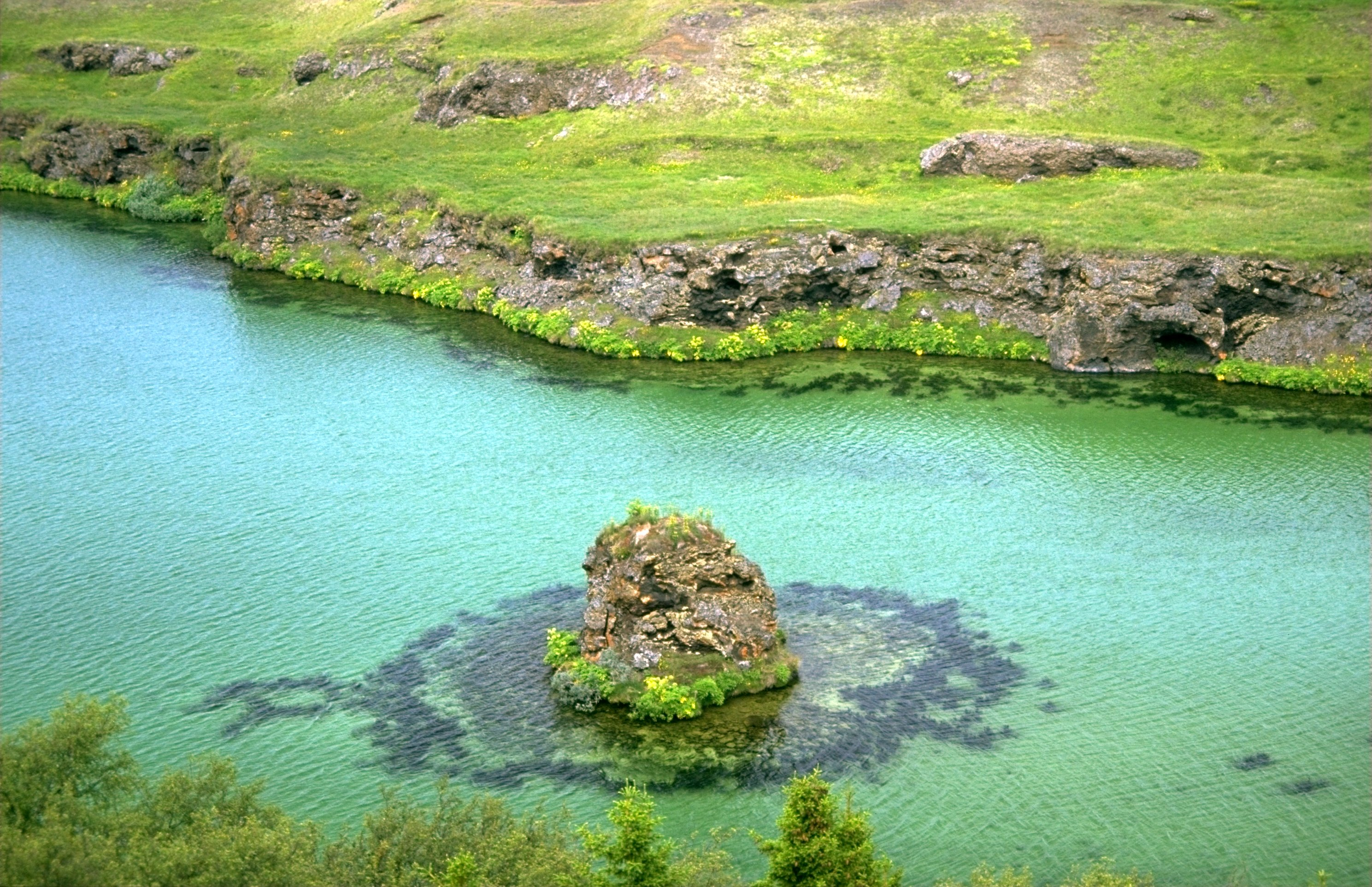
Lava island in Mývatn

Mývatn was created about 2300 years ago by a large fissure eruption of basaltic lava. The lava flowed down the valley Laxárdalur to the lowland plain of Aðaldalur [ˈaːðalˌtaːlʏr̥] where it entered the Arctic Ocean about 50 km away from Mývatn. The crater row that formed along the eruptive fissure is called Þrengslaborgir [ˈθreiŋstlaˌpɔrcɪr̥] (or Lúdentarborgir [ˈluːˌtɛn̥tarˌpɔrcɪr̥]) and has often been used as a textbook example of this type of volcanic activity. There was a large lake in the area at the time, a precursor of the present-day Mývatn. When the lava encountered the lake some of the water-logged lake sediment was trapped underneath it, generating steam explosions.

By repeated explosions in a number of locations, groups of craters built up and now dominate the landscape on the shore of Lake Mývatn and also form some of the islands in the lake. This type of lava formation is known as rootless cones or pseudocraters. A group of such craters at Skútustaðir [ˈskuːtʏˌstaːðɪr̥] on the south shore of the lake is protected as a natural monument. Other rootless cone groups in this lava field are in the valley Laxárdalur and the plain Aðaldalur. The formation of rootless cones halted the advance of the lava in some places creating temporary lava lakes. The lava eventually drained from the lakes, leaving behind a forest of rock pillars. The biggest of these formations is named Dimmuborgir. At another place, Höfði [ˈhœvðɪ], the pillars stand in the lake water. The lava created by the Þrengslaborgir eruption is known as the Younger Laxá Lava.

The Mývatn district lies on the western border of the volcanic zone which cuts across north-eastern Iceland from north to south and is an extension of the Mid-Atlantic Ridge. All geological formations are quite recent, dating from the Ice Age and postglacial times.

The bedrock of the moors west of Mývatn is made up of interglacial lava flows. Most of the mountains in the vicinity of the lake were formed by eruptions under the ice sheet in the glacial periods of the Ice Age. Eruptions that melted their way up through the ice formed table mountains (Bláfjall [ˈplauːˌfjatl̥], Sellandafjall [ˈsɛlˌlantaˌfjatl̥], Búrfell [ˈpurˌfɛtl̥], Gæsafjöll [ˈcaiːsaˌfjœtl̥]), those which did not formed hyaloclastite ridges (Vindbelgjarfjall [ˈvɪntˌpɛlcarˌfjatl̥], Námafjall [ˈnauːmaˌfjatl̥], Dalfjall [ˈtalˌfjatl̥], Hvannfell [ˈkʰvanːˌfɛtl̥]).

At the close of the Ice Age, about 10,000 years ago, the Mývatn basin was covered by a glacier which pushed up huge end moraines which can still be seen at the north end of the lake. After the glacier started melting, a glacial lake was dammed up in the Mývatn depression until the glacier retreated from the present course of Laxá river.

Postglacial volcanism in the Mývatn district may be divided into three cycles. The Lúdent [ˈluːˌtɛn̥t] cycle commenced shortly after the close of the Ice Age. The explosion crater (tephra ring) Lúdent dates from this cycle. Its eruption was followed by a number of small fissure eruptions. About 3800 years ago the shield volcano Ketildyngja [ˈcʰɛːtɪlˌtiɲca] was formed about 25 km south-east of Mývatn, and from it a huge lava flow, the Older Laxá-lava, spread over the southern part of the district, plunged down the valley Laxárdalur and flowed almost to the sea. This lava dammed up the first Mývatn, which was about as large as the present lake.

The second volcanic cycle, the Hverfjall cycle, began 2500 years ago with a gigantic but brief eruption, which formed the explosion crater (tephra ring) Hverfjall (also named Hverfell). An eruption in Jarðbaðshólar [ˈjarðˌpaðsˌhouːlar̥] followed, producing the lavafield between Reykjahlíð and Vogar. Approximately 200 years later a vast lava flow, the Younger Laxá Lava, was erupted (see above). The lava dammed up the present lake Mývatn and also the lakes Sandvatn [ˈsantˌvahtn̥], Grænavatn [ˈkraiːnaˌvahtn̥] and Arnarvatn [ˈa(r)tnarˌvahtn̥].

The third volcanic cycle began with the Mývatnseldar [ˈmiːˌvasːˌɛltar̥] eruptions in 1724–1729 which commenced with an explosion that formed the crater lake Víti [ˈviːtɪ]. Later lava flowed from Leirhnjúkur [ˈleirˌn̥juːkʏr̥] down to the north end of Mývatn, destroying two farms. The Mývatnseldar eruptions are quite similar in character to the recent volcanic activity near Krafla in 1975–1984. The source of both is a central volcano lying between Krafla and Gæsafjöll. Inside the volcano resides a magma chamber from which molten magma periodically bursts into a swarm of fissures that cut through the volcano from north to south.

The recent activity was characterized by periods of slow land rise, interspersed by shorter periods of rapid subsidence, underground magma bursts, rifting, earthquakes and eruptions (nine in all). This is an example of the process of continental drift in Iceland. A central volcano and its associated fissure swarm is called a volcanic system. The Krafla volcanic system is one of several such systems which together form the volcanic zone of Iceland.

A few rhyolite mountains border the Krafla central volcano (Hlíðarfjall [ˈl̥iːðarˌfjatl̥], Jörundur [ˈjœːrʏntʏr̥], Hrafntinnuhryggur [ˈr̥apn̥ˌtʰɪnːʏˌr̥ɪkːʏr̥]).

Because of its volcanic origin, the lake was formerly mined for diatomite, but this ceased in 2004.

== Economy ==
A joint venture of the Icelandic government and Johns-Manville began mining diatomite (fossilized algae) in 1968. The high grade deposits were dredged from the bottom of the lake during the summer months in a 24/7 operation.

== See also ==
- Cladophora
- Geography of Iceland
- List of lakes of Iceland
- Volcanism of Iceland

== Bibliography ==
- Einarsson, Á., Stefánsdóttir, G., Jóhannesson, H., Ólafsson, J.S., Gíslason, G.M., Wakana, I., Gudbergsson, G. and Gardarsson, A. 2004. The ecology of Lake Mývatn and the River Laxá: variation in space and time. Aquatic Ecology 38: 317–348.
- Gardarsson, A. and Einarsson, Á. eds. 1991. Náttúra Mývatns. Hið íslenska Náttúrufræðifélag, Reykjavík. 372 pp. (in Icelandic)
- Gardarsson, A. and Einarsson, Á. 2000. Monitoring waterfowl at Mývatn, Iceland. Pp. 3–20 in F.A. Comin, J.A. Herrera-Silveira and J.Ramirez-Ramirez (eds.): Limnology and Aquatic birds. Monitoring, Modelling and Management. Universidad Autonoma de Yucatán, Mérida, Yucatán, Mexico.
- Gíslason, G.M. 1994. River management in cold regions: a case study of the River Laxá, North Iceland. Pp. 464–483 in: The Rivers Handbook. Hydrological and Ecological Principles. Vol. 2. Eds. P. Calow & G.E. Petts. Blackwell, Oxford. 483 pp.
- Jónasson, P.M. ed. 1979. Ecology of Eutrophic, Subarctic Lake Mývatn and the River Laxá. Oikos 32.
