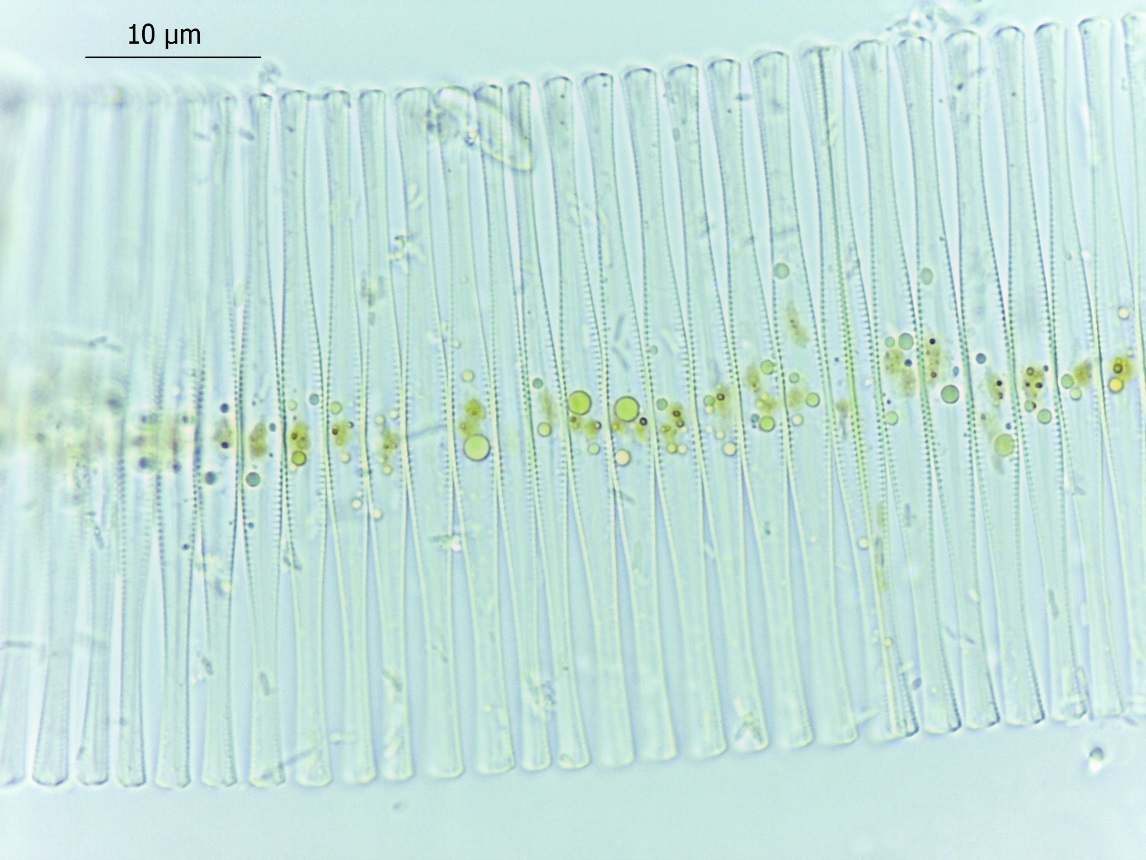
- Fragilaria through the microscope

Scientific classification
- Domain: Eukaryota
- Clade: Sar
- Clade: Stramenopiles
- Division: Ochrophyta
- Clade: Bacillariophyta
- Class: Fragilariophyceae

= Fragilariophyceae =

Class of diatoms

Fragilariophyceae is a group of pennate diatoms lacking a raphe.

== Examples ==
It includes the following genera:

=== Fragilariales ===
- Ardissonea
- Asterionella
- Asterionellopsis
- Catacombas
- Diatoma
- Fragilaria
- Fragilariforma
- Grammonema
- Hyalosynedra
- Neofragilaria
- Opephora
- Pseudostaurosira
- Punctastriata
- Staurosira
- Staurosirella
- Synedra
- Synedropsis
- Tabularia
- Ulnaria

=== Striatellales ===
- Hyalosira
- Striatella
- Toxarium

=== Other ===
- Climacosphenia
- Cyclophora
- Delphineis
- Protoraphis
- Rhabdonema
- Rhaphoneis
- Tabellaria
- Thalassionema
