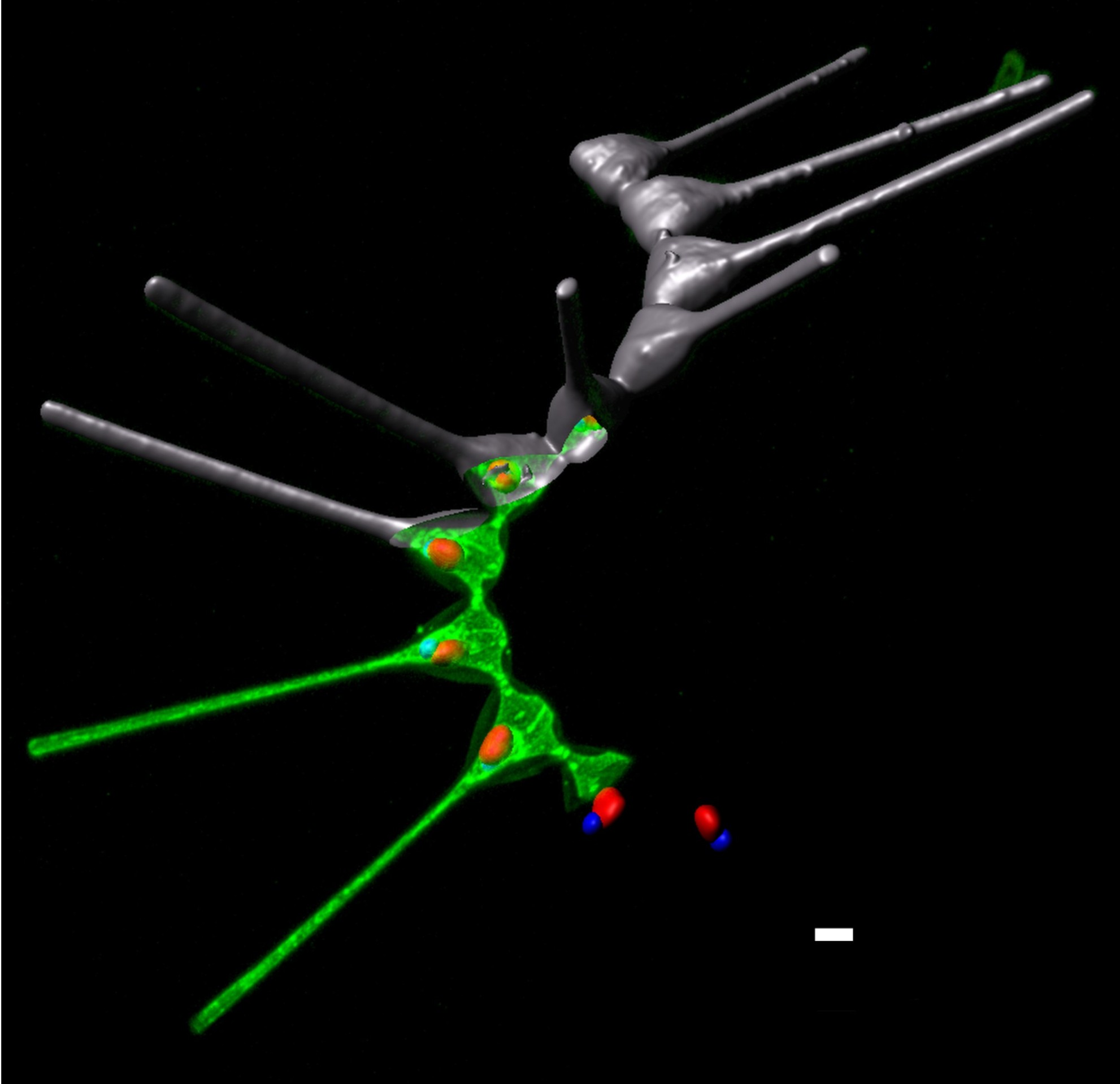
- Environmental high-content fluorescence microscopy (e-HCFM) image of a chain of Asterionellopsis sp. diatoms. Scale bar 5 µm

Scientific classification
- Domain: Eukaryota
- Supergroup: Stramenopiles
- Division: Ochrophyta
- Clade: Bacillariophyta
- Class: Plagiogrammaphyceae
- Order: Rhaphoneidales
- Family: Asterionellopsidaceae
- Genus: Asterionellopsis; Round, 1990

= Asterionellopsis =

Genus of diatoms

Asterionellopsis is a genus of diatoms belonging to the family Asterionellopsidaceae.

Species:

- Asterionellopsis glacialis (Castracane) Round
- Asterionellopsis guyunusae Luddington
- Asterionellopsis kariana (Grunow) Round
- Asterionellopsis lenisilicea L.Mather
- Asterionellopsis maritima F.Muise
- Asterionellopsis socialis (J.C.Lewin & R.E.Norris) R.M.Crawford & C.Gardner
- Asterionellopsis thurstonii J.M.Ehrman
- Asterionellopsis tropicalis A.O.R.Franco
