= Lava pillars =

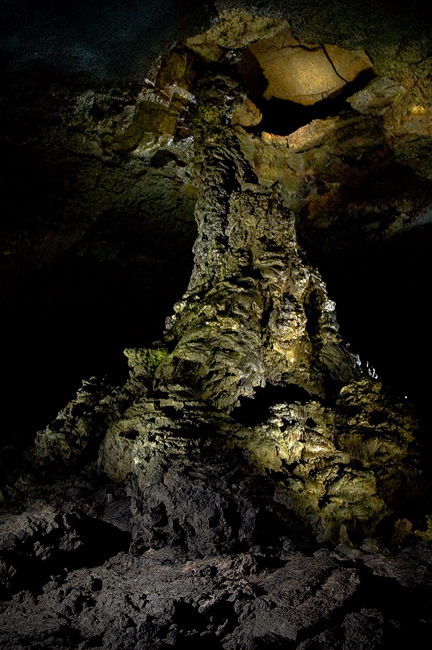
The Manjanggul lava pillar located in the Manjanggul lava tubes on the island of Jeju-do, Korea

Lava pillars are common within collapsed sheet flow terrain. Lava pillars are hollow inside forming a pipe-like channel between the bottom and the top of a lava flow. They sometimes coalesce to form walls or can be attached to other pillars by natural bridges.

Lava pillars originate as gaps between lava lobes as a lava flow initially advances. Water that is trapped beneath the flow is heated and channeled upward through these gaps. This cold water promotes rapid growth of the lava crust around the gaps. Then during flow inflation the hollow pillars continue to act as escape-routes for seawater trapped beneath the lava flow, and so the gaps between lobes grow upwards into pipe-like pillars. The height of the lava pillars is a measure of the maximum thickness the lava flow attained. After lava inflation ends and the eruption wanes, the molten interior of the sheet flow typically subsides leaving a series of "bathtub rings" along the sides of the pillars. These rings are formed as the crust on the subsiding lava repeatedly adheres to and then breaks off from the pillar's sides.

Lava pillars may continue to act as fluid conduits for years after an eruption. In uncollapsed lobate terrain, diffuse hydrothermal venting is typically focused in the depressions within the lobate lavas, which are probably underlain by pillars. Circ Vent is one example of this vent style, and is but one of dozens of similar vents within the same lobate terrain near the eastern edge of the flow from the Axial Seamount eruption in January 1998. Lava pillars exposed within collapse areas are visible in the Rumble and Marker 33 areas.

== See also ==
- Lava
- Lava flow
