= Krafla =

Volcano in north of Iceland

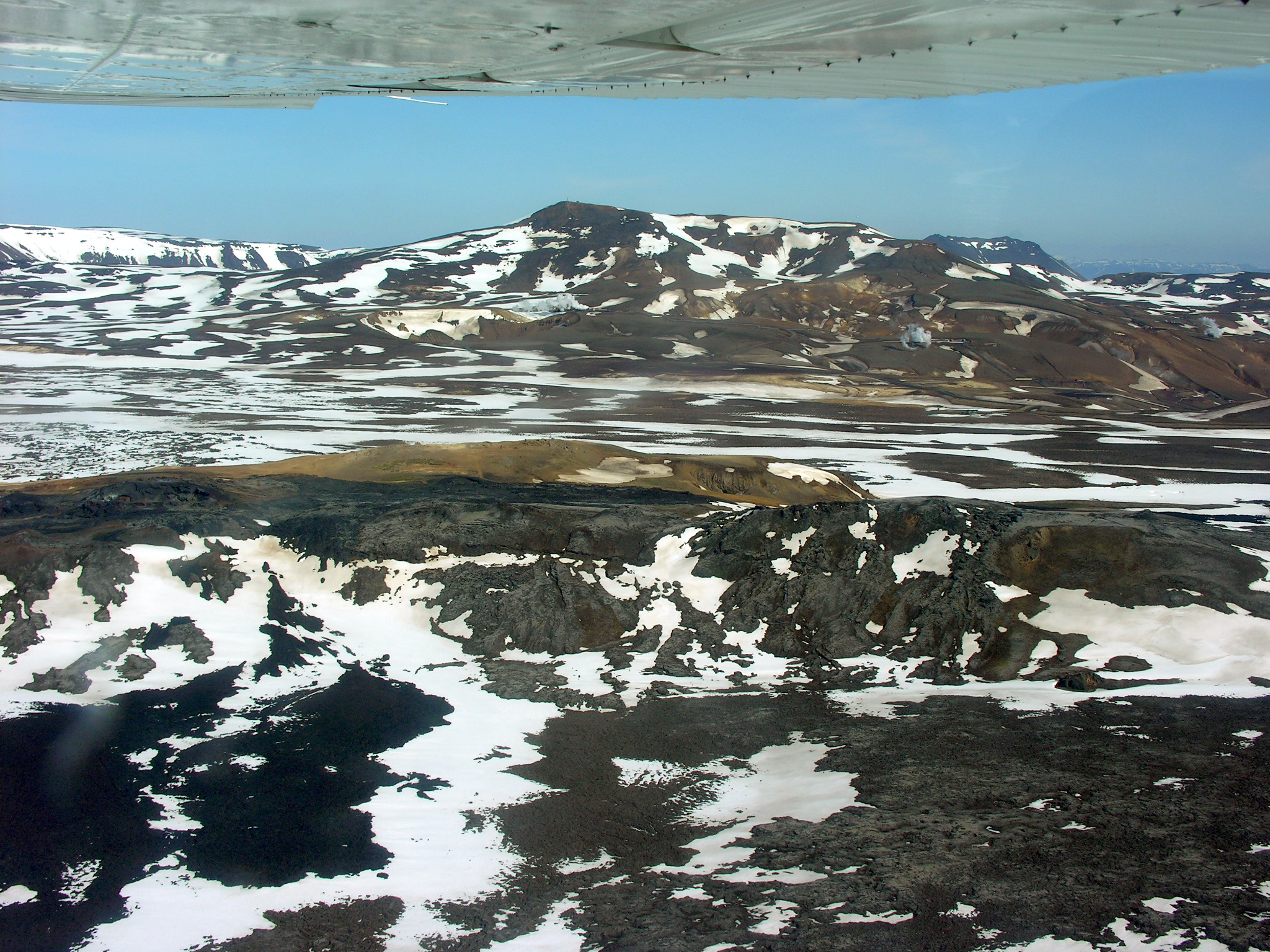
- Aerial view of Krafla (mountain) and Krafla caldera with Leirhnjúkur in 2008

Highest point
- Elevation: 800 m (2,600 ft)
- Coordinates: 65°44′0″N 16°47′0″W

Geography
- Location within Iceland
- Geological features near the Krafla volcanic system (red outlines). Legend: Other shading shows: calderas; central volcanoes; fissure swarms; subglacial terrain above 1,100 m (3,600 ft); seismically active areas; Clicking on the rectangle in the image enlarges to full window and enables mouse-over with more detail. Location in Iceland
- Location: Iceland

Geology
- Mountain type: Caldera
- Last eruption: September 1984

Krafla (Icelandic pronunciation: [ˈkʰrapla]) is a volcanic caldera of about 10 km (6.2 mi) in diameter with a 90 km (56 mi) long fissure zone. It is located in the north of Iceland in the Mývatn region and is situated on the Iceland hotspot atop the Mid-Atlantic Ridge, which forms the divergent boundary between the North American Plate and the Eurasian Plate. Its highest peak reaches up to 818 m (2,684 ft) and it is 2 km (1.2 mi) in depth. There have been 29 reported eruptions in recorded history.

== Overview ==
Iceland Mid-Atlantic Ridge map

Iceland sits astride the Mid-Atlantic Ridge; the western part of the island nation is part of the roughly westward-moving North American plate, while the eastern part of the island is part of the roughly eastward-moving Eurasian Plate. The north–south axis of the Mid-Atlantic Ridge splits Iceland in two, roughly north to south. Along this ridge many of Iceland's most active volcanoes are located; Krafla is one of these.

Krafla includes the crater Víti [ˈviːtɪ], which contains a green lake. South of the Krafla area is Námafjall [ˈnauːmaˌfjatl̥], a mountain, at the foot of which is Hverir [ˈkʰvɛːrɪr̥], a geothermal area with boiling mudpools and steaming fumaroles.

=== History ===
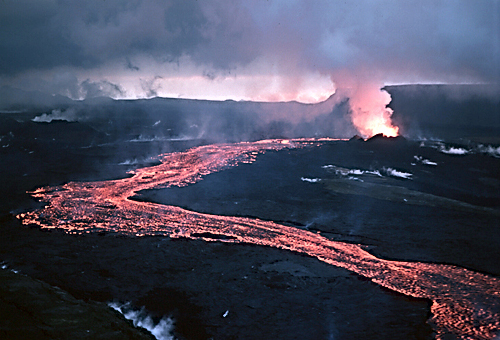
Lava flow during a rift eruption at Krafla, 1984

The Mývatn fires occurred between 1724 and 1729, when many of the fissure vents opened up. The lava fountains could be seen in the south of the island, and a lava flow destroyed three farms near the village of Reykjahlíð, although nobody was harmed.

Between 1975 and 1984, a series of volcanic events known as the Krafla fires took place within the Krafla caldera. There were nine volcanic eruptions and fifteen uplift and subsidence events. During these events a large magma chamber was identified at depth by analysing the seismic activity. Some of the lava fountaining during these eruptions was caught on film by Maurice and Katia Krafft, and features in the 2022 film, Fire of Love.

Since 1977 the Krafla area has been the source of the geothermal energy used by a 60 MWe power station. A survey undertaken in 2006 indicated very high temperatures at depths of between 3 and 5 kilometres (1.9 and 3.1 miles), and these favourable conditions led to the development of the first well from the Iceland Deep Drilling Project, IDDP-1, that found molten rhyolite magma 2.1 km (1.3 mi) deep beneath the surface in 2009. The Krafla fires interrupted some of the geothermal drilling work in the area.

== Krafla magma testbed ==
Following on from the encounter with molten rock during the drilling of IDDP-1, the Krafla Magma Testbed (KMT) concept has been developed, which envisages the creation of an 'international magma observatory' and further scientific drilling at Krafla in order to deliberately drill into the magma body.

== See also ==
- Geography of Iceland
- List of lakes of Iceland
- Geothermal power in Iceland
- Volcanism of Iceland
  - List of volcanic eruptions in Iceland
  - List of volcanoes in Iceland
