= RYG =

RYG may refer to:

- Rodrigo y Gabriela, musical duo
- Anne Ryg, a Norwegian actress
- Eli Skolmen Ryg, a Norwegian television producer
- Jørgen Ryg, a Danish jazz musician and actor
- Kathleen A. Ryg, an Illinois politician
- The IATA airport code for Moss Airport in Rygge, Norway
- Raya Group
