= Geothermal power in Australia =

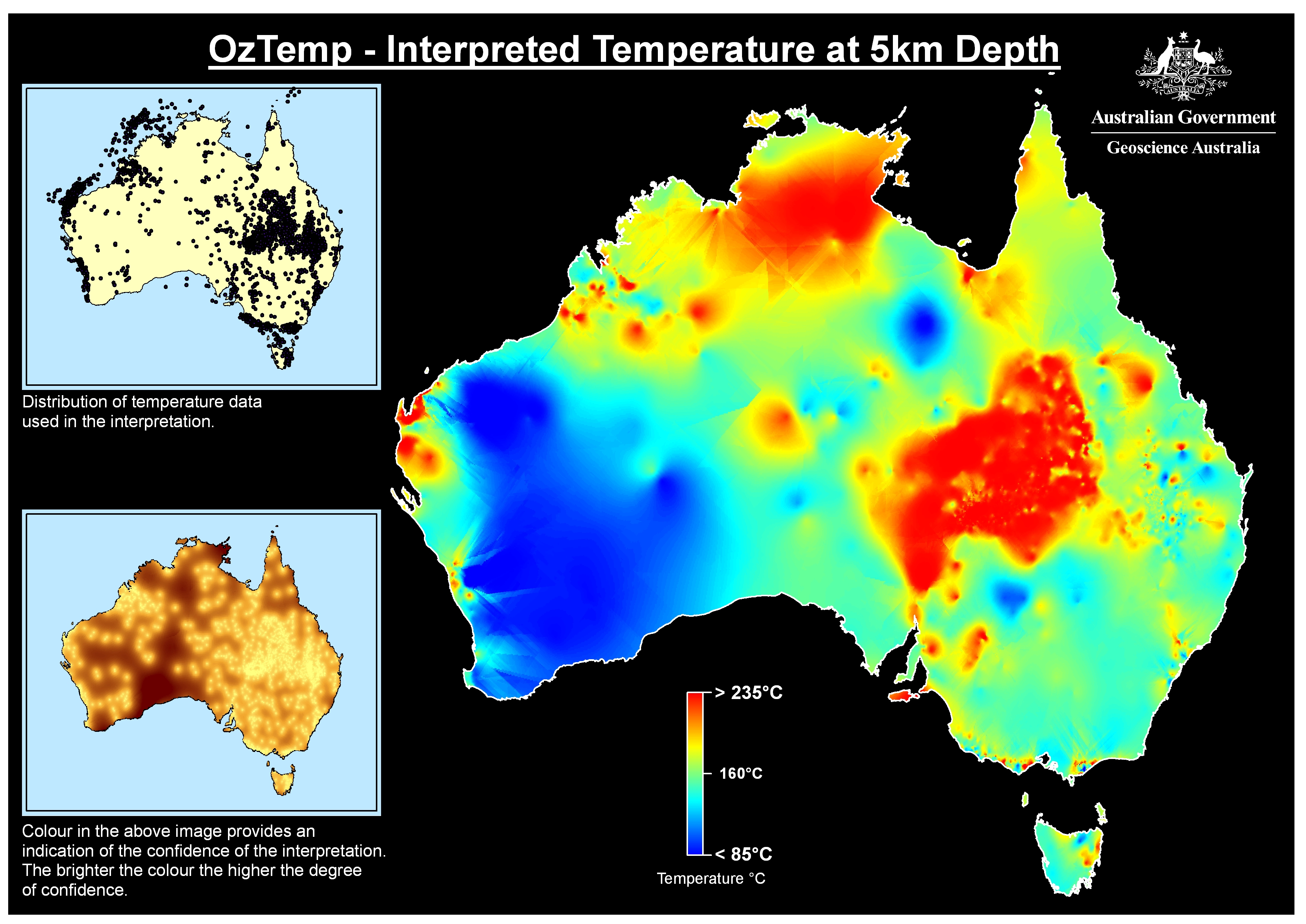
Interpreted Temperature at 5km Depth

Australian radiogenic granite and sedimentary basin geothermal hot rock potential map

Geothermal power in Australia was once hoped to provide cost-effective, renewable power for Australia. Some locations have been shown to contain hot granites at depth, which hold good potential for developing geothermal energy. Exploratory geothermal wells have been drilled to test for the presence of high-temperature geothermal reservoir rocks, and such hot granites were detected. However, all these projects have since been abandoned. A small geothermal plant in Queensland experienced problems during commissioning and remains idle as of May 2022.

== Exploration ==
Exploration involves finding vast blocks of "hot rocks" with fracture systems that could generate electricity through water being injected, circulated through the fractures, and returned to the surface as steam, which could then be used to rotate steam turbines.

There are vast, deep-seated granite systems in Central Australia with high temperatures at depth. Companies such as Panax Geothermal, Geodynamics Ltd, Petratherm, Green Rock Energy and Pacific Hydro have drilled these to depths of more than four kilometres.

South Australia has been described as "Australia's hot rock haven," and this renewable energy is hoped to provide an estimated 6.8% of Australia's base load power needs by 2030.

Parts of central Tasmania have been identified by KUTh Energy as having the potential to generate up to 280MW of power. Such a resource would be able to supply 25% of Tasmania's electricity needs.

However, these projects have been discontinued.

== Projects ==
In 2010, 47 projects were identified in Australia. Of the larger projects, the Geodynamics Cooper Basin demonstration plant progressed the furthest. As of May 2022, no geothermal power plants are operating in Australia.

=== Geodynamics Cooper Basin Demonstration Plant, South Australia ===
A Cooper Basin demonstration project to assess the potential of hot-rock geothermal energy for zero-emission, base-load power was built by Geodynamics. The 1 MWe Habanero pilot plant operated for 160 days in 2013, and prior to the trial's closure, the plant was operating at 19 kg/s and 215 degrees Celsius production well head temperature. However, the project was abandoned after being assessed as uneconomic due to a combination of the cost of commercialising generation and the site's remoteness.

"The technology worked, but unfortunately, the cost of implementing the technology and delivering the electricity that was produced to a market was just greater than the revenue stream that we could create," Geodynamics chief executive Chris Murray said. Geodynamics wells have been plugged and remediated.

Geodynamics is no longer exploring geothermal power and is instead looking at other green energy initiatives. Therefore, it has changed its name to ReNu Energy and its ASX code to RNE.

=== gTET Winton, Queensland ===
A small 310 kW geothermal power generation plant commenced commissioning in 2019, promising to become Australia's only operating geothermal power station. The plant was to utilise 86 °C bore water from existing bores to produce electricity using an Organic Rankine Cycle. However, commissioning problems were not overcome, and as of May 2022, the plant remains idle and the subject of legal dispute.

== See also ==
- Geothermal desalination
- Renewable energy in Australia
- Australian Renewable Energy Agency
- Wind power in Australia
- Solar power in Australia
- Biofuel in Australia
- Renewable energy by country
