= Geothermal power in Chile =

Chile represents one of the largest undeveloped geothermal areas of the world. Despite Chile's good economic performance in the late 1980s and 1990s, geothermal energy did not develop, and Chile has been surpassed by other Latin American countries such as El Salvador and Costa Rica in terms of geothermal development and technology. Currently, Chile has only one geothermal power plant.

The first geothermal explorations in Chile were carried out in 1908, by Italians living in the city of Antofagasta, but it was not until 1968 that systematic exploration started in the north of the country. These later explorations occurred amidst a global wave of research and development of geothermal power. The explorations were carried out after an agreement between the Chilean Government and the United Nations Development Programme. State agency CORFO (Production Development Corporation) created a committee to direct and carry out explorations in Chile's northern regions. These explorations ended in 1976 after the military government headed by Pinochet withdrew Chile from the cooperation program.

High oil prices, unreliability in gas imports from Argentina and a continuously growing electricity demand have led the Chilean governments to further promote new energy sources in the late 1990s and 2000s. New interest in geothermal energy resulted in 2000 in the promulgation of the Law of Geothermal Concessions that regulates exploration and exploitation of geothermal resources.

== Cerro Pabellón power plant ==
As of 2026, Cerro Pabellón is the only geothermal power plant in the country, the first in South America, and the highest-altitude plant of its kind in the world, at 4,500 metres above sea level. The facility, inaugurated in September 2017, is located in the Atacama Desert, in the Ollagüe district of Antofagasta Region. It is composed of two units with a gross installed capacity of 24 MW each, for a total capacity of 48 MW; a third, 33 MW unit will be built. It will be able to produce around 340 GWh per year once fully operational. Cerro Pabellón is owned by Geotérmica del Norte, a joint venture between Enel Green Power Chile —the local unit of the Italian corporation Enel— and Chilean state-owned oil and gas company Enap.

== Exploration and projects ==
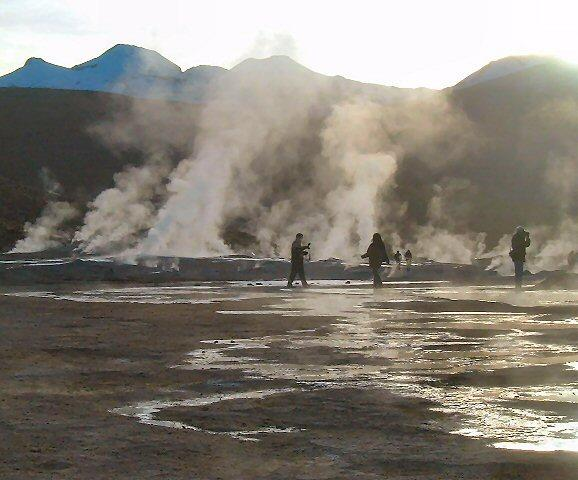
View of the Geysers of El Tatio.

Chile's main areas of geothermal activity are located in the Andes of the Far North and in the south-central areas of the country. Geothermal systems in Chile are associated with volcanoes, so areas lacking significant volcanism like Magallanes Region or Norte Chico have limited power producing capacity. The main areas with potential are, from north to south: Puchuldiza, Apacheta, El Tatio-La Torta, Calabozos, Nevados de Chillán and Cordón Caulle.

In 2005 the National Commission of Energy was considering the starting of three 100 MWe projects in the next 10 years, and in 2011 Energy Minister Rodrigo Álvarez Zenteno said Chile had the potential to produce between 6,000 and 112,000 megawatts of geothermal energy.

A project located in the concession area called San Gregorio, which is being explored by Geoglobal Energy Chile (GGE), is likely to be the first geothermal project to be completed in Chile. The site has potential for 75 MW, and the company submitted it's EIA in March 2012, with a plan to come online in early 2016.

=== El Tatio ===
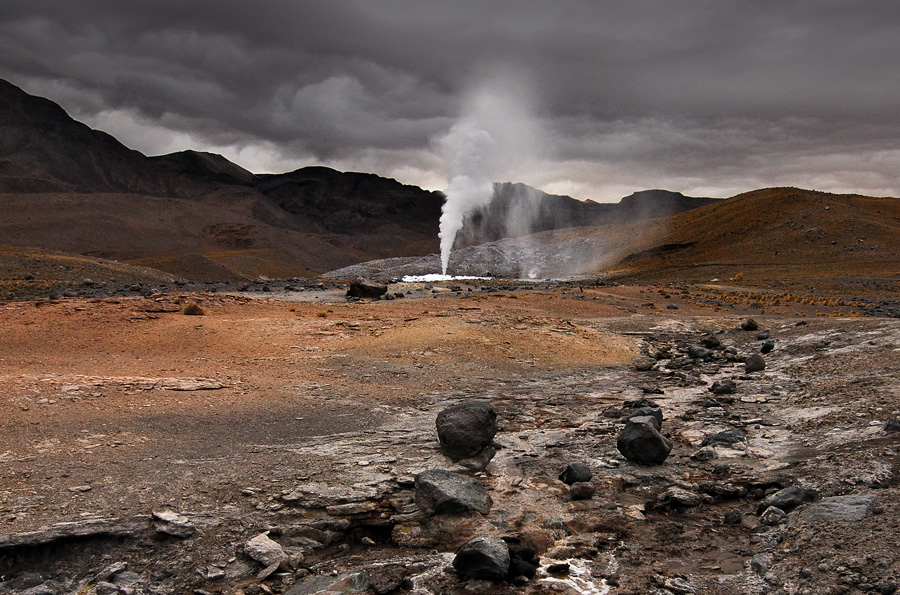
60-meter high artificial fumarole, September 27, 2009.

In September 2009, a failed prospecting drill for geothermal exploitation in the (1960's) Nº 10 well near the El Tatio area, by the Geotérmica del Norte consortium - formed by the Chilean state owned ENAP and Codelco Mining companies in association with Italian state owned ENEL - caused a 60-meter high artificial fumarole to develop, with the company unable to seal it for several weeks. The eruption of the fumarole was followed by strong subterranean noises, and a notable decrease of all but the most active geysers in the area.

This prompted Corema, Antofagasta Region's Environmental Corporation to paralyze all prospecting activities in the zone on October 2, 2009. On October 4 Geotérmica del Norte announced that the fumarole was under control. The day before, a failed attempt to close the well led to strong subterranean noises and Carabineros had to evacuate tourists and the protesters that had gathered at the location. The exploration of El Tatio is controversial, because the area is a major tourist attraction. The site receives over 100.000 visitors per year, and is the principal attraction of nearby San Pedro de Atacama.

The town's mayor (alcalde), Sandra Berma, condemned the ecological impact of the operation and stressed that the geysers are in an indigenous zone that "our people put value on and [our people] show to the world".

=== Tolhuaca-Curacautín ===
Since 2007 the Chilean company of American capital Geotermia del Pacífico is exploring a concession right near the town of Curacautín for building a geothermal power plant with support of CORFO. Geotermia del Pacífico's studies show that two geothermal fields near Curacautín could be used for energy production with combined capacity of supplying 36,000 homes in 2010. One of the geothermal areas to be developed are located close to the Tolhuaca hotsprings and the other in Río Blanco Springs.

== Law of Geothermal Concessions ==
The Law of Geothermal Concessions (Spanish: Ley de Concesiones de Energía Geotérmica) is a Chilean law that regulates geothermal energy since 2000. The law deals with geothermal concessions, tenders, security, ownership relations the role of the state in relation to geothermal energy. It is established that any Chilean or legal person established according to Chilean laws may request, or participate in a tender for a geothermal concession.

According to the law superficial ownership and exploitation rights are distinct. Concession rights are divided into exploration and exploitation ones, and the general geometry of concessions are established. The law does not deal with geothermal water being used for health-care or touristic purposes. The law, Nº 19.657, was published in the Diario Oficial on January 7 of 2000.

== See also ==
- Renewable energy in Chile
- Solar power in Chile
- Renewable energy by country
