= Geothermal power in Germany =

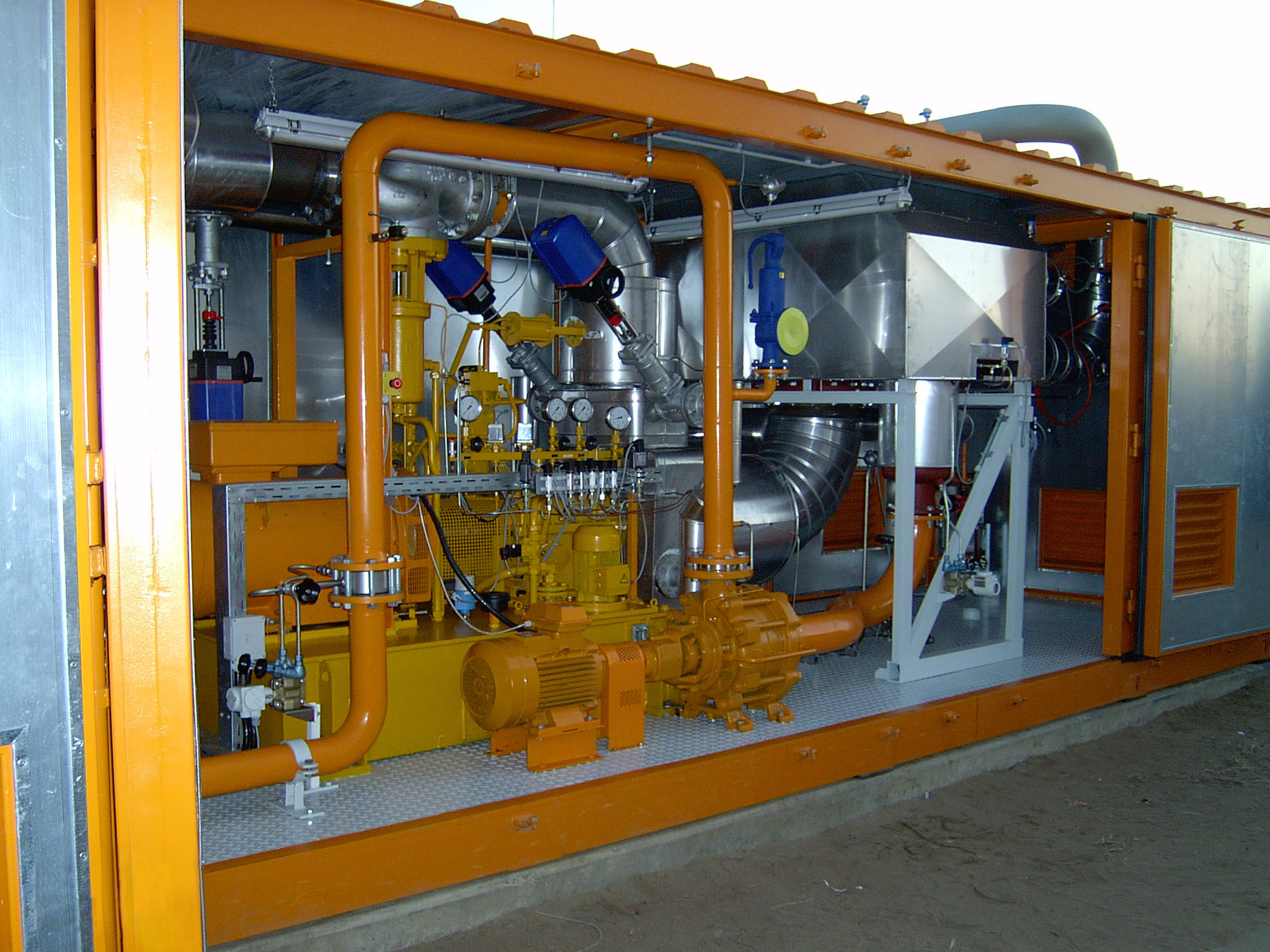
Internal view of the ORC-power plant located in Neustadt-Glewe, Northern Germany

Geothermal power in Germany had a law that benefits the production of geothermal electricity and guarantees a feed-in tariff. Less than 0.4 percent of Germany's total primary energy supply came from geothermal sources in 2004 and 2024. After a renewable energy law that introduced a tariff scheme of EU €0.15 [US $0.23] per kilowatt-hour (kWh) for electricity produced from geothermal sources came into effect in 2004, few new power plants came online due to low ground temperature, reducing thermodynamic efficiency. Geothermal heating is used to heat buildings.

== 21st century power plants ==
The first German geothermal power plant was built in 2003 in Neustadt-Glewe located in northern Germany. This power plant implements Organic Rankine cycle (ORC) technology and has an electricity output of 230 kW. At the same site, a geothermal heat plant built in 2015 is still in operation, it has a geothermal heat output of just 4 MW.

A second geothermal ORC power plant went operational in 2007 in Landau, south Germany. It is operational all-year-round, generating 3 MW of electricity. Shortly after, a third geothermal power plant went operational in Unterhaching, south Germany. This geothermal power plant uses the Kalina process, has a thermal capacity of 38 MW, and supplies the district heating system with heat.

== Sustainability ==
In the same year (2003) the TAB (bureau for technological impact assessment of the German Bundestag) concluded that Germany's geothermal resources could be used to supply the entire base load of the country. This conclusion has regard to the fact that geothermal sources have to be developed sustainably because they can cool out if overused.

== See also ==
- Renewable energy in Germany
- Wind power in Germany
- Solar power in Germany
- Renewable energy by country
