= Geothermal power in El Salvador =

Geothermal power in El Salvador represents 25% of the country's total electricity production. El Salvador is one of the top ten geothermal energy producers in the world. Since 1975, the Ahuachapán geothermal field has been in continuous and successful commercial operation. Since 1992, the Berlín geothermal field is under commercial production, with the installation of two units. Each one with 5 MWe power plants.

== See also ==
- Electricity sector in El Salvador
- Renewable energy by country
