= Piero Ginori Conti =

Italian politician and businessman (1865–1939)

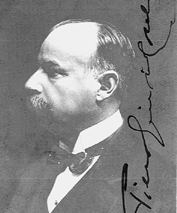
Pietro Ginori Conti

Piero Ginori Conti, Prince of Trevignano (3 June 1865 – 3 December 1939) was an Italian businessman and politician.

== Geothermal electricity and boric acid ==
In 1904, Piero Ginori Conti became the head of the boric acid extraction firm founded by his wife's great-grandfather in Larderello, and took the establishment in a new direction, with the use of natural steam to produce electricity. His business plan was: improving the quality of products, increasing production and lowering prices, and exploiting natural dry steam geysers to produce electricity.

On 4 July 1904, at Larderello, Conti powered five bulbs from a dynamo driven by a reciprocating steam engine using geothermal power. In 1905 he increased power production to 20kW.

This system improved to the point that in 1916 it distributed 2750 kW of electricity in the entire area surrounding the village, including nearby cities of Volterra and Pomarance. With a new international reputation, Larderello was visited by Marie Curie during the First World War.

In 1912, he succeeded his father-in-law, who had no male heirs, as the majority shareholder of the family business. This year also saw the installation of the first geothermal power plant in Larderello, and the merger of three companies competing in the production of boric acid into a new company, the Società Boracifera di Larderello. This restructuring strengthened the family's control of the company's stock and compensated for the increasing competition from America and the decline of boric acid production.

== Fascism's influence on business ==
The geothermal electricity project was put on hold until 1921, after the war, and after years of social unrest ended with the arrival to power of Benito Mussolini, of whom the Ginori Conti and Larderel families were big supporters.

The first general campaign in favour of a strike at Castelnuovo, near Larderello, broke out in 1915. After the war, in which his children and wife (a nurse) served, the first strike hit the various establishments in the Larderello S.p.A., except in Larderello itself: the resistance of the worker's union ran from 9 May to 9 June and continued sporadically until October 1920.

Work then resumed, with 400 employees being laid off, and free health care and guaranteed sick leave being stopped. Workers also now had to pay rent for their homes, were enrolled in the National Fascist Party (PNF), and came under surveillance and guard by members of the same PNF. The area fell under fascist influence from Larderello, until the creation of the tenth combat battalion on 16 October 1920, the first and only in the area until 1922. In October that year, the workers participated in the march on Rome.

Tuscan fascists built local networks through the various sports clubs or other diversions already set up under the influence of the philanthropic Larderel and Ginori Conti.

== Later years ==
On 27 March 1931 the first fumarole exploded with a force and a roar so constant that local residents sealed doors and windows to be able to sleep. The noise could reportedly be heard in the cities of Volterra and Massa Marittima, 25 km away. In 1936, Ferrovie dello Stato opened a new 60 MW power, producing two million pounds of water vapour, in addition to natural gas (93% carbon dioxide, 2.5% hydrogen sulphide, 4.5% of residual fuel).

The prince, many times deputy of Volterra (1896–1919) and senator of the Kingdom in 1919, was now assisted by his eldest son Giovanni (1899–1972), who was a doctor of chemistry, as general manager of establishments, and his youngest son Federico (1909–1975), who became Deputy director general and director of the research laboratory, which opened in 1938.

Following gaining independence from the Società Ligure Toscana di Elettricità and the Società Electrica Valdarno, the Società Boracifera di Larderello was subsequently merged into the SELT-Valdarno electric power company.

After the signing of several agreements after 1932, the Società Boracifera di Larderello passed into the hands of the Ferrovie dello Stato in 1939. Despite the war, the Ferrovie dello Stato conducted further research into steam and electricity generation, with peak production of 900GWh in 1943.

== Death ==
Piero Ginori Conti's status as a Grand Cross and Grand Cordon of the Order of Saints Maurice and Lazarus, and a Minister of State, earned him a state funeral, which was celebrated in the Basilica of Santa Maria del Fiore, in Florence, on 5 December 1939. He left his children a legacy worth 15 million liras (at the time) in real estate and securities.

== Family ==
He was the son of Gino Ginori Conti, belonging to an old aristocratic family of Florence, and Pauline Fabbri. In 1894, he married Adriana de Larderel (1872–1925), daughter of Count Florestan and Marcella de Larderel (who was Piero's cousin), and heir to one of the most significant fortunes in Tuscany. After being widowered, he remarried to a French woman named Odette Guillemard. From the first marriage he had four sons and two daughters; from the second, a single daughter.

The prince was also a Rotarian in the early years of Rotary International in Italy. He became governor of the then District 46, in the year 1928-1929 as well as Chairman of the RC of Florence.
