= Geothermal power in China =

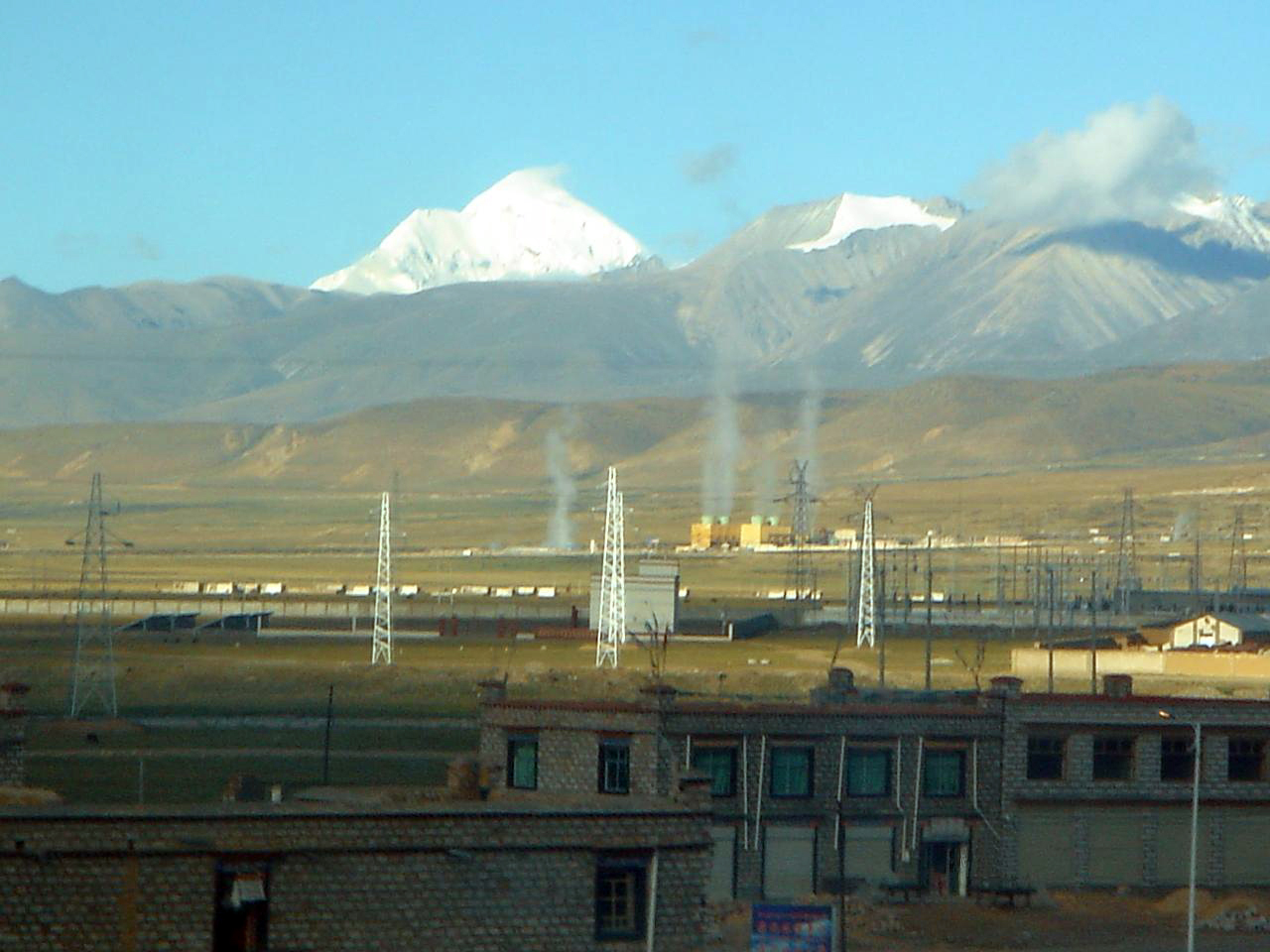
Geothermal power station in Yangbajain

Geothermal exploration began in China in the 1970s. It was initially handled by national bodies with public investments, and productive wells were transferred free of charge to the final user. Since the mid-1990s, under the framework of privatization and liberalization of the economy, national investment in exploration has been reduced. No new plants have been commissioned in the period 2000–2005. The only electricity-producing fields are located in Tibet. According to the "2005 Chinese Geothermal Environment Bulletin" by China's Ministry of Land and Resources, the direct utilization of geothermal energy in China will reach 13.76 cubic metres (486 cu ft) per second, and the geothermal energy will reach 10,769 megawatts, ranking first in the world.

== Projects ==
The most important field is Yangbajain Geothermal Field, with eight double flash units for a total capacity of 24 MW, fueled from a water-dominated shallow reservoir at 140–160 °C (284–320 °F) with 18 wells of average depth 200 m. The field extension is only 4 km^{2} (1.5 sq mi), although there are clear indications of a total thermal anomaly of 15 km^{2}. The annual energy production is approximately 100 GW·h, about 30% of the needs of the Tibetan capital, Lhasa. A deep reservoir has been discovered beneath the shallow Yangbajing field. It is characterized by high temperatures (250–330 °C has been measured at 1,500–1,800 m depth). The field potential is estimated at 50–90 MW. It is still un-exploited. A 2,500 m deep well has been drilled in 2004, reaching the deep reservoir at 1,000–1,300 m. Its evaluation is ongoing.

Additional plants are installed in Langju, West Tibet (two double flash unit, 1 MW each, 80–180 °C) and a 1 MW binary power station (60–170 °C) is operating in Nagqu. Two small 300 kW plants are operating in Guangdong and Hunan.

== Direct uses ==
- Total thermal installed capacity in MWt: 3,687.0
- Direct use in TJ/yr: 45,373.0
- Direct use in GW·h/yr: 12,604.65
- Capacity factor: 0.39

This country is again one of the major users of the direct-use of geothermal energy. Zheng et al. (2005) discusses the latest developments. It appears that along with the restructuring of the economy, national investment in geothermal has decreased. However, as the living standard of the population has risen, geothermal has found favor in that the waters are used more for health, tourism, and balneology in various hot springs

Investors are looking to increase their investment, which has led to an upsurge in geothermal drilling and utilization particularly in the coastal regions of Beijing and Tianjin

The Chinese government is culling together plans for comprehensive geothermal development in conjunction with its 13th five-year plan, which covers the years 2016–2020. As part of this plan, it hopes to develop 100 MW of geothermal by 2015 in northern, central, and southwest China. It will initially focus on high-temperature resources, them move to low- and medium-temperature applications

The management of the resource also plays a big role particularly in the large cities. Here, efficiency in utilization has improved dramatically and environmental concerns are being addressed. For example, in Beijing the total rate of extraction of hot water has been kept stable and has even decreased slightly but energy utilization in terms of GWh produced has increased significantly. The data of Zheng et al. (2005) show that for the whole of China the installed capacity has risen to 3,687 MWt with an annual energy use of 45,373 TJ/yr (including 15 heat pump units ranging from 220 to 760-kW in capacity operating at an equivalent 2,880 full-load hours annually), from the 2000 (Lund and Freeston, 2001) figures of 2,282 MWt and 37,908 TJ/yr an increase in annual energy use of about 20%.

Geothermal space heating covers 545.5 million m^{2} and greenhouse heating cover about 1.33 million m^{2}. There are about 1,600 public hot spring bathing houses and swimming pools, including about 430 where balneology and medical practices prevail in the country. The details of the specific uses are as follows: district heating (550 MWt and 6,391 TJ/yr); greenhouse heating (103 MWt and 1,176 TJ/yr); fish farming (174 MWt and 1,921 TJ/yr); agricultural drying (80 MWt and 1,007 TJ/yr); industrial process heat (139 MWt and 2,603 TJ/yr); bathing and swimming (1,991 MWt and 25,095 TJ/yr); other uses (monitoring) (19 MWt and 611 TJ/yr); and heat pumps (631 MWt and 6,569 TJ/yr).

== See also ==
- Renewable energy in China
- Wind power in China
- Solar power in China
- Bioenergy in China
- Renewable energy by country
- Geothermal power
- Hydroelectric power in China
- Geology of China
- Xianyang – China's "geothermal energy city"
