= Black Rock Mining =

Black Rock Mining Limited
- Formerly: Mokuti Mining Limited; Green Rock Energy Limited
- Traded as: ASX: BKT
- Industry: Mining
- Headquarters: Perth, Australia
- Key people: John de Vries (CEO)
- Website: www.blackrockmining.com.au

Black Rock Mining Ltd (ASX:BKT). BKT’s Mahenge Graphite Project (Mahenge) located in Tanzania hosts a multi-generational graphite resource and is one of the largest JORC-compliant flake graphite resources globally, with 213m tonnes @ 7.8% TGC, and a reserve of 70m tonnes @ 8.5% TGC. The company's Chief Executive Officer is John de Vries.

Black Rock’s Enhanced Definitive Feasibility Study for the Project considers a four-stage construction schedule to deliver in full production 347,000 tonnes per annum of up to 99% LOI Ultra Purity flake graphite concentrate for 26 years.

The project has a number of distinct advantages, including:

- Tier 1 scale;
- First quartile costs due to hydro-dominated grid power;
- Higher revenue profile with large flake distribution and purity; and
- Backed by largest ex-china anode producer, POSCO.

All key Govt agreements and permits are in place, along with US$153m in debt approvals. The project is construction ready, subject to financing.

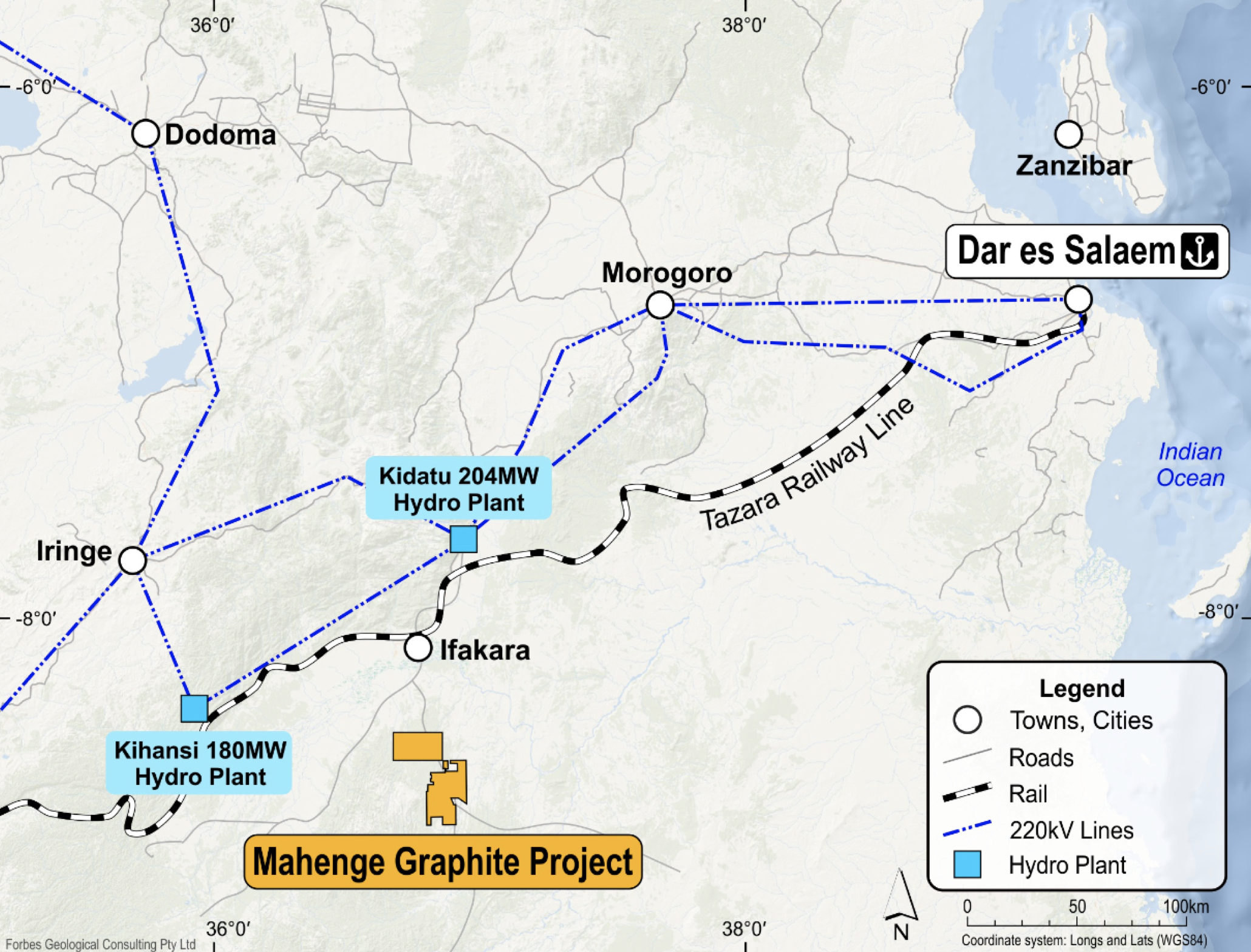
Map showing the location of Black Rock's Mahenge Graphite Project, in Tanzania.
