= Xped =

Australian tech company

Xped Limited
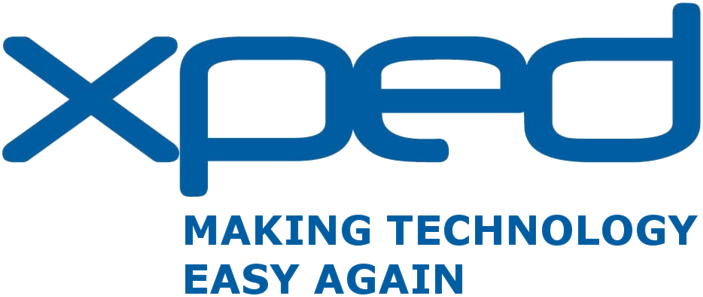
- Company type: Public
- Traded as: (ASX: XPE)
- Industry: Internet of Things
- Headquarters: Adelaide, Australia
- Key people: Chris Wood, John Schultz
- Products: ADRC (Auto Discovery Resource Control) IoT platform technology.
- Website: http://www.xped.com/

Xped Limited (ASX: XPE), formerly Raya Group, is an Internet of Things (IoT) company based in Adelaide, Australia.

== ADRC ==
Auto Discovery Resource Control (ADRC) is an information system where resources, which may be attached to the Internet of Things, are described using Resource Modelling Language (RML) which allows them to be accessed by human users via a Device Browser app or by autonomous computers which may provide a device indexing and search function or by Artificial Intelligence (AI) agents or other inference engines.

== See also ==
Xped will commence development of an ADRC IoT chip with Telink Semiconductor China.

Xped successfully embeds IoT control technology into Intel IoT Gateway Platform.

Xped has acquired JCT Healthcare a nurse call button technology company.
