= Kalina cycle =

Thermodynamic process

The Kalina cycle, developed by Alexander Kalina, is a thermodynamic process for converting thermal energy into usable mechanical power.

It uses a solution of 2 fluids with different boiling points for its working fluid. Since the solution boils over a range of temperatures as in distillation, more of the heat can be extracted from the source than with a pure working fluid. The same applies on the exhaust (condensing) end. This provides efficiency comparable to a Combined cycle, with less complexity.

By appropriate choice of the ratio between the components of the solution, the boiling point of the working solution can be adjusted to suit the heat input temperature. Water and ammonia is the most widely used combination, but other combinations are feasible.

Because of this ability to take full advantage of the temperature difference between the particular heat source and sink available, it finds applications in reuse of industrial process heat, geothermal energy, solar energy, and use of waste heat from power plants (Bottoming cycle). Even at lower pressure, a Kalina cycle may have higher efficiency than a comparable Rankine cycle.

== Kalina cycle power plants ==
Recoverable heat from industrial processes.

The Kalina cycle has been thought to increase thermal power output efficiencies by up to 50% in suitable installations, and is ideally suited for applications such as steel, coal, oil refineries and cement production plants.

- The Kashima Steel Works operated by Sumitomo Metal Industries was commissioned in 1999. It produces 3.6MW of electricity and is the longest running commercial application of the Kalina cycle.
- The Tokyo Bay Oil Refinery operated by Fuji Oil was commissioned in 2005 and produces 4MW of power

Geothermal

- Husavik facility, Iceland rated 2MW electric power output and 20MW heat power
- Unterhaching facility, Germany was commissioned in April 2009 and was the first of its kind (low enthalpy) in southern Germany. This plant produces 3.4MW of electric power and 38MW of heating power for the local township of Unterhaching. The plant shut down in 2017.
- Bruchsal facility, Germany was commissioned in December 2009 and produces 580 kW of electricity.
- EcoGen Unit, the first ever 50 kW EcoGen unit was installed at Matsunoyama Onsen hot spring at Tokamachi, Niigata in Japan in 2011. The EcoGen units are based on the miniaturization of the Kalina Cycle and designed for the Japanese hot spring market and other low enthalpy geothermal markets.

== Second generation ==
A second generation of Kalina cycle systems was developed by Kalina and Kalex LLC. These systems are technically Kalina cycles (in that they utilize multi-component working fluid with variable composition) but they do not use the "Kalina cycle" trademark.

Unlike first generation Kalina cycle systems, which are applicable only for relatively low-temperature heat sources, the second generation of Kalina cycle systems is applicable to both low and relatively high temperature heat sources.

For low temperature heat sources, second generation Kalina cycles are projected to attain thermal efficiencies higher than those possible with first generation cycles.

== Licensing ==
The Kalina cycle trademark and all first generation global patents that are still in force are owned by Wasabi Energy plc. owner of Global Geothermal Ltd., parent company of Recurrent Engineering Inc.

Some of the original Kalina cycle patents have expired and have now entered the public domain. Global Geothermal Ltd. (parent company: Wasabi Energy Ltd.) owns all the worldwide entities licensed to deploy the first generation Kalina Cycle process. As a result, GGL controls the Kalina cycle rights and over 200 international patents associated with this technology. The process is currently used via licensing deals with Siemens and Shanghai Shenge New Energy for all their Chinese applications. FLSmidth has the exclusive right in most countries to offer the first generation Kalina cycle technology to the cement and lime industries.

All second generation Kalina cycle patents are currently owned by Kalex LLC, a company founded by Kalina.
