= Lists of films based on actual events =

This is an index of articles that features lists of films based on real-life events.

- List of films based on actual events (before 1940)
- List of 1940s films based on actual events
- List of 1950s films based on actual events
- List of 1960s films based on actual events
- List of 1970s films based on actual events
- List of 1980s films based on actual events – 1980 1981 1982 1983 1984 1985 1986 1987 1988 1989
- List of 1990s films based on actual events – 1990 1991 1992 1993 1994 1995 1996 1997 1998 1999
- List of 2000s films based on actual events – 2000 2001 2002 2003 2004 2005 2006 2007 2008 2009
- List of 2010s films based on actual events – 2010 2011 2012 2013 2014 2015 2016 2017 2018 2019
- List of 2020s films based on actual events – 2020 2021 2022 2023 2024 2025 2026

== See also ==
- List of war films
