= List of 2000s films based on actual events =

This is an index of articles that features lists of films based on real-life events.

- List of 2000 films based on actual events
- List of 2001 films based on actual events
- List of 2002 films based on actual events
- List of 2003 films based on actual events
- List of 2004 films based on actual events
- List of 2005 films based on actual events
- List of 2006 films based on actual events
- List of 2007 films based on actual events
- List of 2008 films based on actual events
- List of 2009 films based on actual events
