= List of 2010s films based on actual events =

This is an index of lists of films and miniseries released in the 2010s that are based on actual events.

- List of 2010 films based on actual events
- List of 2011 films based on actual events
- List of 2012 films based on actual events
- List of 2013 films based on actual events
- List of 2014 films based on actual events
- List of 2015 films based on actual events
- List of 2016 films based on actual events
- List of 2017 films based on actual events
- List of 2018 films based on actual events
- List of 2019 films based on actual events
