= Factual film =

Factual film may refer to:

- Biographical film, a film that dramatizes the life of an actual person or group of people
- Documentary film, a nonfiction motion picture intended to "document reality, primarily for instruction, education or maintaining a historical record
- Historical film, a film set in the past which presents historical events and characters with varying degrees of fiction such as creative dialogue or scenes which compress separate events
- List of films based on actual events
