= John Ketcham =

John Ketcham may refer to:

- John Ketcham (Indiana surveyor) (1782–1865), surveyor, building contractor, and judge
- John Ketcham (producer-director), film producer
- John C. Ketcham (1873–1941), politician from the U.S. state of Michigan
- John H. Ketcham (1832–1906), U.S. Representative from New York
