= List of 2003 films based on actual events =

This is a list of films and miniseries that are based on actual events. All films on this list are from American production unless indicated otherwise.

== 2003 ==
- 44 Minutes: The North Hollywood Shoot-Out (2003) – crime action television film depicting a dramatization of the 1997 North Hollywood shootout
- A Date with Darkness: The Trial and Capture of Andrew Luster (2003) – drama television film based on a true story about criminal Andrew Luster
- Alltag (2003) – Turkish-German drama film depicting life in the neighborhood of Kreuzberg
- America's Prince: The John F. Kennedy Jr. Story (2003) – biographical television film about John F. Kennedy Jr.
- American Splendor (2003) – biographical comedy drama film about Harvey Pekar, the author of the American Splendor comic book series
- An Ancient Tale: When the Sun Was a God (Polish: Stara baśń: Kiedy słońce było bogiem) (2003) – Polish historical film about the legendary 9th-century ruler of two proto-Polish tribes (the Goplans and West Polans), Popiel
- Anastasia Slutskaya (Belarusian: Анастасія Слуцкая) (2003) – Belarusian historical film about Princess Anastasia Slutskaya
- And Starring Pancho Villa as Himself (2003) – Western drama television film about Pancho Villa and the Mexican Revolution
- Autumn in Warsaw (Japanese: ワルシャワの秋) (2003) – Japanese drama television film based on actual events of 1922, when the cooperation of the Polish Committee of Rescue of Children from the Far East, and the Japanese Red Cross Society led to the transportation of Polish orphans from Russian Siberia to Japan, before they could have been relocated to Poland
- Baadasssss! (2003) – biographical drama film based on the struggles of Melvin Van Peebles, as he attempts to film and distribute Sweet Sweetback's Baadasssss Song, a film that was widely credited with showing Hollywood that a viable African-American audience existed, and thus influencing the creation of the Blaxploitation genre
- Bad Boys (Finnish: Pahat pojat) (2003) – Finnish crime drama film based on the story of a notorious real-life family of criminals known as "the Daltons of Eura"
- Beautiful Boxer (Thai: บิวตี้ฟูล บ๊อกเซอร์) (2003) – Thai biographical sports film telling the life story of Parinya Charoenphol, a famous kathoey, Muay Thai fighter, actress and model
- Behind the Camera: The Unauthorized Story of Three's Company (2003) – comedy drama television film documenting the success of the sitcom Three's Company, as well as the interpersonal conflicts that occurred among its staff and cast
- Benedict Arnold: A Question of Honor (2003) – historical drama television film portraying the career of Benedict Arnold in the American Revolutionary War and his dramatic switch in 1780 from fighting for American Independence to being a Loyalist trying to preserve British rule in America
- Blind Flight (2003) – British prison drama film based on the true-life story of the kidnapping and imprisonment of the Irish academic Brian Keenan and the English journalist John McCarthy, two of the hostages in the Lebanon hostage crisis
- Bolívar the Hero (Spanish: Bolívar el héroe) (2003) – Colombian animated biographical film about the life of Simon Bolivar
- Bon Voyage (2003) – French mystery war thriller film loosely inspired by Professor Lew Kowarski's smuggling of the world's only supplies of heavy water out of France following its occupation by the Nazis
- Boudica (2003) – British historical television film about the queen of the Iceni tribe, Boudica
- The Brides in the Bath (2003) – British crime television film based on the life and trial of British serial killer and bigamist George Joseph Smith, the "Brides in the Bath Murderer"
- Byron (2003) – British biographical television film based on the adult life of English poet Lord Byron
- Calendar Girls (2003) – British comedy film based on a true story of a group of middle-aged Yorkshire women who produced a nude calendar to raise money for Leukaemia Research (now Blood Cancer UK) under the auspices of the Women's Institutes in April 1999 after the husband of one of their members dies from cancer
- Cambridge Spies (2003) – British historical miniseries based on the true story of four brilliant young men at the University of Cambridge who are recruited to spy for the Soviet Union in 1934
- Catharisis (Japanese: カタルシス) (2003) – Japanese crime drama television film about a 14-year-old boy murders a young girl in the suburbs of Tokyo, based on a true story
- Charles II: The Power and the Passion (2003) – British historical miniseries covering the life of Charles II – beginning just before his Restoration to the throne in 1660
- Colosseum: Rome's Arena of Death (2003) – British historical television film which tells the true story of Verus, a gladiator who fought at the Colosseum in Rome
- Conspiracy of Silence (2003) – British drama film challenging celibacy and its implication for the Catholic Church in the 21st century, inspired by real events
- The Crooked E: The Unshredded Truth About Enron (2003) – biographical drama television film depicting the rise and fall of the Enron company, as seen from the perspective of employee Brian Cruver, based on his book
- The Cruelest Day (Italian: Ilaria Alpi – Il più crudele dei giorni) (2003) – Italian drama film dramatizing the last days of life of RAI journalist Ilaria Alpi and of her cameraman Miran Hrovatin before they were killed in Mogadishu, Somalia, on 20 March 1994
- Danielle Cable: Eyewitness (2003) – British crime drama television film based upon the murder of Stephen Cameron by Kenneth Noye in a road rage incident in 1996
- Danny Deckchair (2003) – Australian comedy film inspired by the story of the Lawnchair Larry flight
- D.C. Sniper: 23 Days of Fear (2003) – crime drama television film based on the Beltway sniper attacks of 2002
- DC 9/11: Time of Crisis (2003) – biographical drama television film re-enacting the events of the September 11 attacks in 2001 as seen from the point of view of the President of the United States and his staff
- Deacons for Defense (2003) – drama television film loosely based on the activities of the Deacons for Defense and Justice in 1965 in Bogalusa, Louisiana
- The Deal (2003) – British political drama television film depicting the Blair–Brown deal, a well-documented pact that Tony Blair and Gordon Brown made, whereby Brown would not stand in the 1994 Labour leadership election so that Blair could have a clear run at becoming leader of the party and later Prime Minister
- Deng Xiaoping (Mandarin: 鄧小平) (2003) – Chinese biographical film about the life of Deng Xiaoping, though it only covers the twenty years from his return to power in 1976.
- El Cid: The Legend (Spanish: El Cid, la leyenda) (2003) – Spanish animated historical drama film based on the story of Rodrigo Díaz de Vivar, also known as El Cid
- Elephant (2003) – psychological drama film chronicling the events surrounding a school shooting, based in part on the 1999 Columbine High School massacre
- The Elizabeth Smart Story (2003) – crime drama television film about the high-profile Elizabeth Smart kidnapping case
- Eroica (2003) – British historical television film dramatizing the first performance of Beethoven's third symphony, the Eroica
- Escape from Taliban (Hindi: तालिबान से बचो; Urdu: طالبان سے فرار) (2003) – Indian Hindi- and Urdu-language biographical war film based on the story A Kabuliwala's Bengali Wife by Sushmita Banerjee, who fled Afghanistan in 1995 after six years of living there with her Afghan husband
- Evil (Swedish: Ondskan) (2003) – Swedish drama film based on Jan Guillou's semi-autobiographical novel of the same name
- Ferrari (2003) – Italian biographical drama film depicting Enzo Ferrari's rise from a successful race driver to one of the most famous entrepreneurs of all time
- Flying Saucers (Spanish: Platillos volantes) (2003) – Spanish comedy drama film based on a true story of how two decapitated corpses are found on the train tracks near Terrassa together with a note reading "The extraterrestrials are calling us. We belong to infinity"
- Frankie and Johnny Are Married (2003) – comedy film chronicling the troubles a producer has trying to mount a production of the Terrence McNally play Frankie and Johnny in the Clair de Lune
- Full-Court Miracle (2003) – family sport drama television film inspired by the true story of University of Virginia Cavaliers basketball star Lamont Carr
- Gacy (2003) – crime thriller film based on the crimes of John Wayne Gacy, an American serial killer who raped, tortured, and murdered at least thirty-three men and boys in Chicago, Illinois during the 1970s
- George Orwell: A Life in Pictures (2003) – British biographical drama television film depicting the life story of the British author George Orwell
- Girl with a Pearl Earring (2003) – British-American-Luxembourgian historical drama film presenting a fictional account of Johannes Vermeer, the model and the painting
- Godforsaken (Dutch: Van God Los) (2003) – Dutch drama film based on the real life of the "Gang from Venlo", that left a trail of death and destruction in the North-Middle Limburg area from 1993 till 1994
- Gods and Generals (2003) – epic war drama film following the story of Stonewall Jackson from the beginning of the American Civil War to his death at the Battle of Chancellorsville
- Going for Broke (2003) – Canadian-American crime drama television film based on the true story of former Juvenile Diabetes Foundation charity director Gina Garcia, who from 1993 to 1997 fraudulently issued cheques from the charity to herself to funnel money into her bank account for her compulsive gambling addiction, after which she was arrested, resulting in legislation that required that casinos and other gaming establishments in the state of Nevada have a telephone number posted for gambling addiction services
- The Good Pope: Pope John XXIII (Italian: Il Papa Buono) (2003) – Italian biographical television film based on real life events of Pope John XXIII
- The Gospel of John (2003) – British-Canadian-American Christian epic drama film recounting the life of Jesus according to the Gospel of John
- Grand Theft Parsons (2003) – American-British comedy drama film based on the true story of country rock musician Gram Parsons, who died of an overdose in 1973
- Haggard: The Movie (2003) – comedy film based on the story of how reality television personality Ryan Dunn's girlfriend may have cheated on him
- Henry VIII (2003) – British historical biographical miniseries chronicling the life of Henry VIII of England from the disintegration of his first marriage to an aging Spanish princess until his death following a stroke in 1547, by which time he had married for the sixth time
- High Roller: The Stu Ungar Story (2003) – biographical drama film focusing on the life of American professional poker and gin player Stu Ungar
- Hitler: The Rise of Evil (2003) – Canadian war drama miniseries exploring Adolf Hitler's rise and his early consolidation of power during the years after the First World War and focusing on how the embittered, politically fragmented and economically buffeted state of German society following the war made that ascent possible
- Holy Cross (2003) – Northern Irish drama television film based on the events of the Holy Cross dispute of 2001, which affected the families and children who attended the Holy Cross Primary School, a Catholic school for girls, in the Ardoyne, Belfast area
- Homeless to Harvard: The Liz Murray Story (2003) – biographical drama television film based on the true story of Liz Murray who is notable for having been accepted by Harvard University despite being homeless in her high school years
- I Accuse (2003) – Canadian crime drama film based on the case of John Schneeberger, a Canadian doctor convicted of using drugs to rape two patients
- Ice Bound: A Woman's Survival at the South Pole (2003) – biographical survival television film telling the true story of the cancer-stricken physician Dr. Jerri Nielsen who was stranded at a South Pole research station who the help of co-workers, had to treat her own illness
- Imperium: Augustus (2003) – British-Italian historical television film telling the life story of Octavian and how he became Augustus
- In Search of Janáček (Czech: Hledání Janáčka) (2003) – Czech biographical film about the life of composer Leoš Janáček
- Jagged Harmonies: Bach vs. Frederick II (German: Mein Name ist Bach) – German-Swiss historical biographical film about how a battle of egos ensued when Johann Sebastian Bach and Frederick the Great met
- Jasper, Texas (2003) – crime drama television film based on a true story and focusing on the aftermath of a crime in which three white men from the small town of Jasper, Texas, killed African American James Byrd Jr. by dragging him behind their pickup truck
- Kamachi (Japanese: かまち) (2003) – Japanese biographical film centring around the life of poet and painter Kamachi Yamada at the age of 17
- The Lion in Winter (2003) – historical drama television film depicting the personal and political conflicts of Henry II of England, his wife Eleanor of Aquitaine, their children and their guests during Christmas 1183
- LOC: Kargil (Hindi: एलओसी: कारगिल) (2003) – Indian Hindi-language historical war film based on the Indian Army's successful Operation Vijay that was launched in May 1999 in the wake of the Pakistani intrusion and occupation of the strategic heights in the Kargil sector to flush out the Pakistani intruders from the Indian side of the Line of Control
- Looking for Victoria (2003) – British historical drama television film based on the life of Queen Victoria
- The Lost Prince (2003) – British historical drama miniseries about the life of Prince John – youngest child of Britain's King George V and Queen Mary – who died at the age of 13 in 1919
- Lucy (2003) – biographical drama television film based on the life and career of actress and comedian Lucille Ball
- Luther (2003) – historical drama film dramatizing the life of Protestant Christian reformer Martin Luther
- Maria Goretti (2003) – Italian biographical drama television film based on real life events of Catholic virgin martyr and saint Maria Goretti
- Martha, Inc.: The Story of Martha Stewart (2003) – biographical drama television film depicting the life of Martha Stewart starting from her life in New Jersey to the scandal behind her arrest
- Memories of Murder (Korean: 살인의 추억) (2003) – South Korean crime thriller film loosely based on the Hwaseong serial murders, which took place between 1986 and 1991 in Hwaseong, Gyeonggi
- The Middle of the World (Portuguese: O Caminho das Nuvens) (2003) – Brazilian drama film based on the true story of Cícero Ferreira Dias, a former truck driver who took his family from Paraíba to Rio de Janeiro in search of a "R$1,000 job"
- The Miracle of Bern (German: Das Wunder von Bern) (2003) – German sport drama film about the unexpected West German miracle victory in the 1954 World Cup Final in Bern, Switzerland
- Monsieur N. (2003) – British-French historical drama film telling the story of the last years of the life of the Emperor Napoléon, who was imprisoned by the British on St Helena
- Monster (2003) – biographical crime drama film following serial killer Aileen Wuornos, a street prostitute who murdered seven of her male clients between 1989 and 1990 and was executed in Florida in 2002
- Mother Teresa of Calcutta (Italian: Madre Teresa) (2003) – Italian biographical television film based on the life of Mother Teresa, the founder of the Missionaries of Charity religious institute
- My Dinner With Jimi (2003) - comedy film focusing on the career of The Turtles, and the famous musicians they meet along the way, including Jimi Hendrix
- Naked Ambition (Cantonese: 豪情) (2003) – Hong Kong comedy film set in the world of Hong Kong's pornography and prostitution business and based on a true story
- Ned Kelly (2003) – Australian bushranger film dramatizing the life of Ned Kelly, a legendary bushranger and outlaw who was active mostly in the colony of Victoria
- The Night We Called It a Day (2003) – Australian-American comedy drama film based on the true events surrounding Frank Sinatra's 1974 tour in Australia
- Open Water (2003) – survival thriller film loosely based on the true story of Tom and Eileen Lonergan, who in 1998 went out with a scuba diving group, Outer Edge Dive Company, on the Great Barrier Reef, and were accidentally left behind because the dive-boat crew failed to take an accurate headcount
- Osama (Dari: اُسامه) (2003) – Afghan drama film following a preteen girl living in Afghanistan under the Taliban regime who disguises herself as a boy, Osama, to support her family, inspired by a news story Siddiq Barmak read while in Peshawar, Pakistan
- The Other Boleyn Girl (2003) –British biographical drama television film centring around courtier Mary Boleyn and her sister Anne Boleyn, second wife of Henry VIII, King of England, and their competition for his affections
- Out of the Ashes (2003) – biographical drama television film depicting a dramatization of the life of Holocaust concentration camp survivor Gisella Perl
- Owning Mahowny (2003) – Canadian biographical crime film based on the true story of Brian Molony, a Toronto bank employee who embezzled more than $10 million to feed his gambling addiction
- Paanch (Hindi: पाँच) (2003) – Indian Hindi-language crime thriller film loosely based on the 1976–77 Joshi-Abhyankar serial murders in Pune
- Paradise Found (2003) – biographical drama film based on the life of Post-Impressionist painter Paul Gauguin
- Party Monster (2003) – biographical crime drama film telling the story of the rise and fall of the infamous New York City party promoter Michael Alig
- The Pentagon Papers (2003) – historical drama television film about Daniel Ellsberg and the events leading up to the publication of the Pentagon Papers in 1971
- Pompeii: The Last Day (2003) – British historical drama television film dramatizing the eruption of Mount Vesuvius towards the end of August, 79 AD
- Poor Poor Paul (Russian: Бедный, бедный Павел) (2003) – Russian historical drama film about Czar Paul I of Russia
- The Postcard Bandit (2003) – Australian crime drama television film loosely based on the life of a convicted bank robber Brenden James Abbott
- The Private Life of Samuel Pepys (2003) – British historical comedy film portraying historical diarist Samuel Pepys
- Radio (2003) – biographical sport drama film based on the true story of T. L. Hanna High School football coach Harold Jones and a young man with an intellectual disability, James Robert "Radio" Kennedy
- The Reagans (2003) – biographical drama television film about U.S. President Ronald Reagan and his family
- Remake (2003) – Bosnian war film about a father living in Sarajevo during World War II and his son living through the Siege of Sarajevo during the Bosnian War, based on incidents which occurred in the life of Zlatko Topčić
- Right on Track (2003) – family sport drama film based on Courtney and Erica Enders, two sisters who get into junior drag racing and make it all the way to the top
- Rosenstrasse (2003) – German historical drama film dealing with the Rosenstrasse protest of 1943
- Rudy: The Rudy Giuliani Story (2003) – biographical drama television film depicting the life of Rudy Giuliani, focusing primarily on his mayoral career and response to the 11 September attacks
- Saints and Soldiers (2003) – war drama film loosely based on events that took place after the Malmedy massacre during the Battle of the Bulge
- Salem Witch Trials (2003) – American-Canadian historical drama miniseries depicting a dramatization of the Salem witch trials
- Saving Jessica Lynch (2003) – biographical drama television film beginning with the ambush of Jessica Lynch's convoy in the middle of an Iraqi city and following a version of events that credits an Iraqi citizen, Mohammed Odeh al-Rehaief, with being responsible for helping to arrange a daring rescue by US special operations forces
- Seabiscuit (2003) – sport drama film based on the life and racing career of Seabiscuit, an undersized and overlooked Thoroughbred race horse, whose unexpected successes made him a hugely popular media sensation in the United States during the Great Depression
- Secret File (Italian: Segreti di Stato) (2003) – Italian historical drama film depicting a fictional investigation about the Portella della Ginestra massacre
- Shattered Glass (2003) – American-Canadian biographical drama film about journalist Stephen Glass and his scandal at The New Republic
- Sibelius (2003) – Finnish biographical drama film about Jean Sibelius
- Silmido (Korean: 실미도) (2003) – South Korean action drama film based on the true story of Unit 684
- Singing Behind Screens (Italian: Cantando dietro i paraventi) (2003) – Italian adventure drama film loosely inspired to real life events of Chinese pirate Ching Shih
- Soldier's Girl (2003) – biographical drama film based on a story of the relationship between Barry Winchell and Calpernia Addams and the events that led up to Barry's murder by a fellow soldier
- Song for a Raggy Boy (2003) – Irish historical drama film telling the true story of a single teacher's courage to stand up against an untouchable prefect's sadistic disciplinary regime and other abuse in a Catholic Reformatory and Industrial School in 1939 Ireland
- Spinning Boris (2003) – comedy film claiming to be based on the true story of three American political consultants who worked for the successful reelection campaign of Boris Yeltsin in 1996
- Spy Sorge (Japanese: スパイ・ゾルゲ) (2003) – Japanese biographical film about the Soviet spy Richard Sorge
- Stander (2003) – South African biographical drama film about Captain André Stander, a South African police officer turned bank robber
- Stealing Rembrandt (2003) – Danish crime comedy film relating to the 1999 theft of one of Rembrandt's paintings from the poorly protected Nivaagaard Samlingen in Nivå in Denmark
- Stealing Sinatra (2003) – drama television film telling the story of the kidnapping of Frank Sinatra, Jr. by Barry Keenan
- The Story of the Weeping Camel (Mongolian: Ингэн нулимс) (2003) – German-Mongolian biographical docudrama about a family of nomadic shepherds in the Gobi Desert trying to save the life of a rare white bactrian camel (Camelus bactrianus) calf after it was rejected by its mother
- Swimming Upstream (2003) – Australian biographical drama film showing the life of Tony Fingleton from childhood to adulthood, and dealing with a topsy-turvy family
- Sylvia (2003) – British biographical romantic drama film based on the real-life romance between prominent poets Sylvia Plath and Ted Hughes
- Tere Naam (Hindi: तेरे नाम) (2003) – Indian Hindi-language romantic drama film based on a real-life incident of a friend of Bala's, who had fallen in love, lost his mind and ended up at a mental asylum
- To Kill a King (2003) – British historical drama film centring on the relationship between Oliver Cromwell and Thomas Fairfax in the post-war period from 1648 until the former's death, in 1658
- Touching the Void (2003) – British survival drama film concerning Joe Simpson and Simon Yates' near-fatal descent after making the first successful ascent of the West Face of Siula Grande in the Cordillera Huayhuash in the Peruvian Andes, in 1985
- Veronica Guerin (2003) – American-Irish-British biographical crime film focusing on Irish journalist Veronica Guerin, whose investigation into the drug trade in Dublin led to her murder in 1996, at the age of 37
- Wonderland (2003) – crime drama film based on the real-life Wonderland murders that occurred in 1981
