= John Schneeberger =

Canadian sex offender

Dr. John Schneeberger
- Born: 1961 (age 64–65); Lusaka, Northern Rhodesia (now Zambia)
- Occupation: Physician
- Spouse: Lisa Dillman (divorced)
- Children: Two children, plus one stepdaughter and one stepson
- Status: Released
- Criminal charges: Sexual assault, administering a noxious substance, obstruction of justice
- Penalty: Six years

John Schneeberger (born 1961) is a Northern Rhodesian-born criminal who drugged and sexually assaulted one of his female patients and also his stepdaughter while working as a physician in Canada. For years, he evaded arrest by implanting a fake blood sample inside a plastic tube in his arm, which confounded DNA test results.

== Early life ==
John Schneeberger was raised in Northern Rhodesia (now Zambia) and received his medical degree at Stellenbosch University in South Africa. In 1987, he moved to Canada. He lived in the town of Kipling, Saskatchewan, and practised in the Kipling Medical Centre.

In 1991, he married Lisa Dillman, who had two children from a previous marriage. Schneeberger and Dillman had two daughters during their marriage. In 1993, he acquired Canadian citizenship while retaining his South African citizenship.

== Sexual assault case ==
Schneeberger was accused of serious sexual crimes, and convicted after successfully foiling DNA tests several times.

On the night of 31 October 1992, Schneeberger sedated his 23-year-old patient, Candice (known on Forensic Files as "Candy"), and sexually assaulted her. He used midazolam, sold under the brand name Versed, a sedative known to cause significant memory loss. Despite its strong amnesic effects, Candy was still able to remember the assault and reported the crime to police.

Schneeberger's blood sample was, however, found not to match the samples of the detected semen, thus clearing him of suspicion. In 1993, at the victim's request, the test was repeated but the result was negative as well. In 1994, the case was closed.

Candy, still convinced that her recollections were true, hired Larry O'Brien, a private detective, to investigate the case. He broke into Schneeberger's car and obtained another DNA sample, which this time matched the semen on the victim's underwear and pants. As a result, a third official test was organized. The obtained blood sample was found too small and of too poor quality to be useful for analysis.

In 1997, Lisa Schneeberger found out that her husband had repeatedly drugged and sexually assaulted her 15-year-old daughter from her first marriage. She reported him to the police, who ordered a fourth DNA test. This time, multiple samples were taken: blood, mouth swab, and hair follicle. All three matched the semen samples from the daughter.

During his 1999 trial, Schneeberger revealed the method he used to foil the DNA tests. He implanted a 15 cm Penrose drain filled with another man's blood and anticoagulants in his arm. During tests, he tricked the laboratory technician into taking the blood sample from the place the tube was planted.

He was found guilty of sexual assault, of administering a noxious substance, and of obstruction of justice, and received a six-year prison sentence.

The College of Physicians and Surgeons of Saskatchewan stripped Schneeberger of his medical licence and his wife divorced him. She also reported him to the Canadian immigration authorities.

In 2003, Schneeberger was released on parole after serving four years in prison. He was stripped of his Canadian citizenship (granted in 1993) due to having obtained his citizenship illegally, as he had lied to a Canadian citizenship judge in claiming that he was not the subject of a police investigation. In December 2003, Canadian authorities revoked his citizenship and ordered his deportation.

Being a permanent resident of South Africa, he was returned there in July 2004. He moved to Durban to live with his mother. According to a report by the Mercury News in Durban, Schneeberger applied to the Health Professions Council of South Africa to work in medicine less than three weeks after his arrival in Durban. The Council was considering the former doctor's registration until Schneeberger suddenly withdrew it in mid-October.

== In media ==
His case was depicted in a 2003 true crime series, 72 Hours ("The Good Doctor") on CBC, and in a Canadian film, I Accuse. It was also featured in an episode of Forensic Files ('Bad Blood') on Court TV, now TruTV.

The case also inspired works of fiction, including "Serendipity", a fifth season episode of Law & Order: Special Victims Unit, and the first episode of the 2009 Japanese drama Kiina.

The case was featured on Autopsy episode 7, "Dead Men Talking" (2001) on HBO.

The case is also mentioned in M. W. Craven's book Black Summer. This is the second book in the detective Washington Poe series.

Also the subject of the true crime podcast Canadian True Crime Stories "The Good Doctor".
