= I Accuse (2003 film) =

- DVD cover
- Directed by: John Ketcham
- Written by: Matthew DeJong; Charles Wilkinson
- Produced by: John Ketcham; Mark Reid; Gavin Wilding; Executive producers: Lisa M. Hansen; Michael Shepard
- Starring: Estella Warren; John Hannah; John Kapelos; Tom Butler; Cavan Cunningham; Aaron Pearl
- Cinematography: Mark Dobrescu
- Edited by: Dov Samuel
- Music by: Chris Ainscough
- Production companies: CineTel Films; Accusatory Productions; Corus Entertainment; Rampage Entertainment
- Distributed by: First Look International
- Release dates: November 30, 2003 (Canadian TV); September 13, 2005 (United States)
- Running time: 95 minutes
- Country: Canada
- Language: English

I Accuse is a 2003 drama film directed by John Ketcham. It is based on the case of John Schneeberger, a Canadian doctor convicted of using drugs to rape two patients.

== Characters ==
- Estella Warren as Kimberly Jantzen
- John Hannah as Richard Darian
- John Kapelos as Detective Murray
- Tom Butler as Warren Hart
- Cavan Cunningham as Male Clerk
- Aaron Pearl as Billy
- Tim Henry as Officer Rod Kresgy
- Lindi Lee as Nola
