= John Ketcham (producer-director) =

American film producer and director

John Ketcham is a Canadian film producer. Ketcham produced and directed I Accuse and produced The Hurricane. For which he was nominated at the Producers Guild Awards for the film The Hurricane, along with Armyan Bernstein and Norman Jewison.

== Filmography ==
He was a producer in all films unless otherwise noted.

=== Film ===
Year	Film	Notes
1999	The Hurricane	
2003	I Accuse	Also director

=== Television ===
Thanks

Year	Title	Role
2008	Corner Gas	Special thanks
