= List of 2000 films based on actual events =

This is a list of films and miniseries that are based on actual events. All films on this list are from American production unless indicated otherwise.

== 2000 ==
- A Father's Choice (2000) – drama television film about two sisters who are accustomed with the fast-paced life in the big city being forced to live with their father in the country when their mother is killed, loosely based on a true story
- Ali: An American Hero (2000) – biographical sport drama television film chronicling portions of the career of heavyweight boxer Muhammad Ali
- All-American Girl: The Mary Kay Letourneau Story (2000) – crime drama television film based on the real-life story of Mary Kay Letourneau's repeated rape of one of her sixth-grade students
- Almost Famous (2000) – comedy drama film based on Cameron Crowe's early life, telling the coming-of-age story of a teenage journalist writing for Rolling Stone magazine while covering a fictitious rock band named Stillwater
- American Tragedy (2000) – crime drama television film based on the O. J. Simpson murder case for the 1994 murder of his ex-wife, Nicole Brown Simpson, and her friend, Ron Goldman
- Angels of the Universe (Icelandic: Englar alheimsins) (2000) – Icelandic biographical drama film based on Einar Már Guðmundsson's 1995 novel of the same name, a semi-fictional story about Einar's brother Pálmi Örn Guðmundsson (named Páll in the book and movie)
- April Captains (Portuguese: Capitães de Abril) (2000) – Portuguese historical drama film telling the story of the Carnation Revolution, the military coup that overthrew the corporatist dictatorship (known as the Estado Novo) in Portugal on 25 April 1974
- The Audrey Hepburn Story (2000) – biographical drama television film based on the life of British actress and humanitarian Audrey Hepburn
- Badding (2000) – Finnish biographical film about Finnish rock singer Rauli "Badding" Somerjoki
- Bang Rajan (Thai: บางระจัน) (2000) – Thai historical drama film depicting the battles of the Siamese village of Bang Rachan against the Burmese invaders in 1767
- Bawandar (Hindi: बवंडर) (2000) – Indian Hindi-language crime drama film based on the true story of Bhanwari Devi, a rape victim from Rajasthan, India, depicting the personal trauma, public humiliation and legal injustice that she went through
- The Beach Boys: An American Family (2000) – biographical musical miniseries depicting a dramatization of the early years of The Beach Boys, from their formation in the early 1960s to their peak of popularity as musical innovators, through their late-1960s decline (and Brian Wilson's beginning battle with mental illness), to their re-emergence in 1974 as a nostalgia and "goodtime" act
- Beat (2000) – biographical drama film focusing primarily on the last several weeks of writer Joan Vollmer's life in 1951 Mexico City, leading up to her accidental killing by her husband, the writer William S. Burroughs
- Before Night Falls (2000) – biographical drama film depicting the life of Cuban poet and novelist, Reinaldo Arenas
- Best (2000) – British biographical drama film portraying the football career of the Northern Irish footballer George Best, particularly his years spent at Manchester United
- Bharathi (Tamil: பாரதி) (2000) – Indian Tamil-language biographical film based on the life of Subramania Bharati
- Bij ons in de Jordaan (2000) – Dutch biographical miniseries about the singer Johnny Jordaan
- Bread and Roses (2000) – British-Spanish-German drama film based on the "Justice for Janitors" campaign of the Service Employees International Union (SEIU)
- Burnt Money (Spanish: Plata quemada) (2000) – Argentine-French-Spanish-Uruguayan action thriller film inspired by the true story of a notorious 1965 bank robbery in Buenos Aires
- The Captain's Daughter (Russian: Капитанская дочка) (2000) – Russian drama film portraying a romanticized account of Pugachev's Rebellion in 1773–1774
- Cheaters (2000) – biographical television film chronicling the story of the 1994–1995 Steinmetz High School team that cheated in the United States Academic Decathlon
- Chopper (2000) – Australian crime drama film based on the autobiographical books by criminal turned author Mark "Chopper" Read, following Read's life and time in prison
- The Color of Friendship (2000) – biographical family drama television film based on actual events about the friendship between two girls; Mahree & Piper, one from the United States and the other from apartheid South Africa, who learn about tolerance and friendship
- The Corner (2000) – biographical drama miniseries chronicling the life of a family living in poverty amid the open-air drug markets of West Baltimore, based on the nonfiction book The Corner: A Year in the Life of an Inner-City Neighborhood (1997) by David Simon and Ed Burns
- The Courage to Love (2000) – historical television film about Henriette Delille, a free woman of color, who was born in 1813 into one of New Orleans' most prominent families
- The Crossing (2000) – historical drama television film about George Washington's crossing of the Delaware River and the Battle of Trenton
- Dark Prince: The True Story of Dracula (2000) – horror war television film about Vlad III Dracula, "the Impaler", the historical figure who gave Bram Stoker's Dracula his name
- Daydream Believers: The Monkees' Story (2000) – biographical drama television film about the rock and pop band the Monkees
- Dirty Pictures (2000) – biographical drama television film focusing on the 1990 trial of Cincinnati Contemporary Arts Center director Dennis Barrie, who was accused of promoting pornography by presenting an exhibit of photographs by Robert Mapplethorpe that included images of naked children and graphic displays of homosexual sadomasochism
- The Dish (2000) – Australian historical comedy drama film telling the story of the Parkes Observatory's role in relaying live television of humanity's first steps on the Moon during the Apollo 11 mission in 1969
- Dr. Babasaheb Ambedkar (Hindi: डॉ बाबासाहेब अम्बेडकर) (2000) – Indian Hindi-language biographical film telling the story of B. R. Ambedkar, known mainly for his contributions in the emancipation of the downtrodden and oppressed castes, and as a result, the oppressed classes in India and shaping the Constitution of India, as the chairman of the Drafting Committee of the Indian Constituent Assembly
- Empire Under Attack (Russian: Империя под ударом) (2000) – Russian historical miniseries about the confrontation of the Security Department and the SR Combat Organization at the beginning of the 20th century
- Enslavement: The True Story of Fanny Kemble (2000) – biographical drama television film depicting the life of British actress and abolitionist Fanny Kemble, who sees first-hand the horrors of slavery when she marries an American plantation owner
- Erin Brockovich (2000) – biographical legal drama film dramatizing the true story of Erin Brockovich who initiated a legal case against the Pacific Gas and Electric Company (PG&E) over its culpability for the Hinkley groundwater contamination incident
- Essex Boys (2000) – British crime drama film based loosely around events in December 1995 that culminated in the Rettendon murders of three drug dealers in Rettendon, Essex, UK
- Falcone (2000) – crime drama miniseries depicting the true story of Joseph D. Pistone, an FBI agent who goes undercover to bring down the American Mafia
- The Farewell (German: Abschied – Brechts letzter Sommer) (2000) – German drama film depicting the last hours of Bertolt Brecht's life
- The Filth and the Fury (2000) – British musical drama film following the story of punk rock pioneers the Sex Pistols from their humble beginnings in London's Shepherd's Bush to their fall at the Winterland Ballroom in San Francisco
- The Final Days (2000) – comedy short film depicting Bill Clinton's last days in the White House
- For Love or Country: The Arturo Sandoval Story (2000) – biographical drama television film about jazz musician Arturo Sandoval
- Freedom Song (2000) – biographical drama television film based on true stories of the Civil Rights Movement in Mississippi in the 1960s, telling the story of the struggle of African Americans to register to vote
- Getting Away with Murder: The JonBenet Ramsey Story (2000) – biographical crime drama television film based on the 1996 killing of JonBenét Ramsey
- Gojoe (Japanese: 五条霊戦記) (2000) – Japanese action martial arts film about Benkei, a Japanese warrior monk (sōhei) who lived in the latter years of the Heian Period (794–1185)
- Gostanza da Libbiano (2000) – Italian historical drama film based on the original 1594 trial records of the eponymous nun accused of witchcraft in Tuscany
- Greenfingers (2000) – British comedy film loosely based on the true story about the award-winning prisoners of HMP Leyhill, a minimum-security prison in the Cotswolds, England
- Gripsholm (2000) – Swiss biographical film following a summer adventure of Kurt Tucholsky
- Growing Up Brady (2000) – biographical television film about the production of the 1969–1974 ABC sitcom The Brady Bunch
- Harlan County War (2000) – biographical television film inspired by the labor dispute of the same name in 1931
- Hendrix (2000) – biographical television film about the life of Jimi Hendrix
- Hey Ram (Hindi: हे राम!; Tamil: ஹே ராம்) (2000) – Indian Hindi and Tamil-language crime drama film depicting India's Partition and the assassination of Mahatma Gandhi by Nathuram Godse
- His Wife's Diary (Russian: Дневник его жены) (2000) – Russian biographical drama film about the last love affair of Ivan Bunin
- Hoover (2000) – biographical drama film based on the life of J. Edgar Hoover, the controversial figure who founded and headed the Federal Bureau of Investigation
- I Dreamed of Africa (2000) – biographical drama film based on the autobiographical novel I Dreamed of Africa by Kuki Gallmann, an Italian writer who moved to Kenya and became involved in conservation
- In His Life: The John Lennon Story (2000) – biographical television film about John Lennon's teenage years
- In the Light of the Moon (2000) – American-British crime horror film based on the crimes of Ed Gein, an American murderer who killed at least two women in Plainfield, Wisconsin during the 1950s
- Innocents (2000) – British medical crime drama television film based upon the Bristol heart scandal of the 1980s and 90s
- The Iron Ladies (Thai: สตรีเหล็ก) (2000) – Thai comedy film following the true events of a men's volleyball team, composed mainly of gay and kathoey (transgender) athletes
- Is It Clear, My Friend? (Croatian: Je li jasno, prijatelju?) (2000) – Croatian prison drama film based on real events about a man who gets life sentence for committed crime in a Yugoslavian prison
- Isn't She Great (2000) – biographical comedy drama film presenting a fictionalized biography of author Jacqueline Susann
- Joe Gould's Secret (2000) – drama film based on the magazine article Professor Sea Gull and the book Joe Gould's Secret by Joseph Mitchell
- Joseph: King of Dreams (2000) – animated Christian drama film telling the story of Joseph from the Book of Genesis in the Bible
- Joseph of Nazareth (Italian: Giuseppe di Nazareth) (2000) – Italian Christian drama television film dramatizing the life of Joseph of Nazareth
- The King Is Dancing (French: Le Roi danse) (2000) – French-German-Belgian historical drama film presenting libertine and pagan Jean-Baptiste Lully as a natural ally of the early Enlightenment figure Louis XIV in his conflicts with the Catholic establishment, focusing on Lully's personal relationship with the French King, as well as his camaraderie with Molière and rivalry with Robert Cambert
- King of the World (2000) – biographical drama television film depicting the early stages of the career of heavyweight boxer Muhammad Ali
- The King's Daughters (French: Saint-Cyr) (2000) – French historical drama film about Louis XIV's final wife Madame de Maintenon who wishes to set up a boarding school for young daughters of noble families that have fallen on hard times, the Maison royale de Saint-Louis, a school where girls receive a pious but liberal education
- Leak (Dutch: Lek) (2000) – Dutch thriller film based on a real-life Dutch police scandal from 1994
- Leftenan Adnan (2000) – Malaysian biographical war film chronicling the actions of Adnan bin Saidi who had been involved as a Lieutenant of the Malay Regiment fending against the invasion of the Japanese army during the Second World War
- The Legend of Rita (German: Die Stille nach dem Schuss) (2000) – German drama film focusing on collusion between the East German secret police, or Stasi, and the West German terrorist group Red Army Faction
- The Libertine (French: Le Libertin) (2000) – French comedy film about philosopher Denis Diderot, one of the modernists of the French 18th-century Age of Enlightenment movement
- The Linda McCartney Story (2000) – British-American biographical drama television film presenting the life story of Linda McCartney and her romance and marriage to Beatles member Paul McCartney
- Little Richard (2000) – biographical television film chronicling the rise of American musical icon Little Richard from his poor upbringing in Macon, Georgia to achieving superstardom as one of the pioneers of rock and roll music
- Livin' for Love: The Natalie Cole Story (2000) – biographical drama television film about the life of R&B singer Natalie Cole
- Longitude (2000) – British drama miniseries about John Harrison, an 18th-century clockmaker who created the first clock (chronometer) sufficiently accurate to be used to determine longitude at sea—an important development in navigation
- Lumumba (2000) – French-Belgian-German-Haitian biographical film depicting the rise and fall of Patrice Lumumba, and is set in the months before and after Congo-Léopoldville achieved independence from Belgium in June 1960
- Markova: Comfort Gay (2000) – Filipino biographical drama film based loosely on the life of Walter Dempster Jr., the last surviving Filipino "comfort gay" (male sex slaves for Imperial Japanese Army) from World War II
- Marlene (2000) – German biographical film following the life of the German actress Marlene Dietrich and her success in Hollywood
- Meat Loaf: To Hell and Back (2000) - Biographical Television Movie based on the life and career of Meatloaf, and his partnership with Jim Steinman
- Men of Honor (2000) – drama film based on Master Chief Petty Officer Carl Brashear the first African-American Master Diver of the U.S. Navy
- Mermaid (2000) – drama television film based on the real-life story of Desiree Leanne Gill as she learns to accept her father's death
- The Middle Passage (French: Passage du milieu) (2000) – French-Senegalese historical drama film about the trans-Atlantic voyage of black slaves from the West Coast of Africa to the Caribbean, a part of the triangular slave trade route called the Middle Passage
- Miracle in Lane 2 (2000) – biographical family drama television film based on the life of Justin Yoder, who was the first person with a disability to compete in the All American Soapbox Derby
- The Miracle Worker (2000) – biographical drama television film based on the life of Helen Keller and Anne Sullivan's struggles to teach her
- Monarch (2000) – British historical drama film about Henry VIII
- Murderous Maids (French: Les blessures assassines) (2000) – French biographical drama film telling the true story of two French maids, Christine and Lea Papin
- My Dog Skip (2000) – comedy drama film telling the story of a 9-year-old Willie Morris as he is given a Smooth Fox Terrier for his birthday, and how the dog fundamentally changes several aspects of his life
- Nora (2000) – biographical drama film examining the relationship between James Joyce and Nora Barnacle
- Noriega: God's Favorite (2000) – biographical television film telling the story of the rise of general Manuel Noriega from utter poverty to military dictator of Panama
- Nuremberg (2000) – Canadian-American biographical drama miniseries telling the story of the Nuremberg trials
- Odd Little Man (Norwegian: Da jeg traff Jesus... med sprettert) (2000) – Norwegian biographical family drama film based on one of the biographic memoirs of Odd Børretzen
- One Hundred Steps (Italian: I cento passi) (2000) – Italian biographical film about the life of Peppino Impastato, a left-wing political activist who opposed the Mafia in Sicily
- Padre Pio: Between Heaven and Earth (Italian: Padre Pio – Tra cielo e terra) (2000) – Italian biographical drama television film based on real life events of Roman Catholic friar and later Saint, Padre Pio
- Padre Pio: Miracle Man (Italian: Padre Pio) (2000) – Italian biographical drama television film depicting real life events of Roman Catholic friar and later Saint Pio of Pietrelcina
- Pandaemonium (2000) – British historical biographical film based on the early lives of English poets Samuel Taylor Coleridge and William Wordsworth, in particular their collaboration on the Lyrical Ballads (1798), and Coleridge's writing of Kubla Khan
- Perfect Murder, Perfect Town (2000) – crime drama miniseries covering in great detail what was considered a botched investigation into the murder of six-year-old JonBenét Ramsey, whose body was found in the basement of her Boulder, Colorado home on 26 December 1996
- The Perfect Storm (2000) – biographical disaster film telling the story of the Andrea Gail, a commercial fishing vessel that was lost at sea with all hands after being caught in the Perfect Storm of 1991
- Pollock (2000) – biographical drama film centring on the life of American painter Jackson Pollock, his struggles with alcoholism, as well as his troubled marriage to his wife Lee Krasner
- Possessed (2000) – horror television film inspired by the exorcism case of Roland Doe
- The Prince's Manuscript (Italian: Il manoscritto del Principe) (2000) – Italian biographical drama film recounting the later life of writer Giuseppe Tomasi di Lampedusa
- Quills (2000) – American-British-German historical film inspired by the life and work of the Marquis de Sade, re-imagining the last years of the Marquis's incarceration in the insane asylum at Charenton
- Rated X (2000) – biographical drama television film chronicling the story of the Mitchell brothers, Jim and Artie, who were pioneers in the pornography and strip club businesses in San Francisco in the 1970s and 1980s
- Remember the Titans (2000) – biographical sport drama film based on the true story of coach Herman Boone and his attempt to integrate the T. C. Williams High School (now Alexandria City High School) football team in Alexandria, Virginia, in 1971
- The Replacements (2000) – American-British sport comedy film loosely based on the 1987 NFL strike, specifically the Washington Redskins, who won all three replacement games without any of their regular players and went on to win Super Bowl XXII
- Ricky 6 (2000) – American-Mexican-Canadian biographical crime film based on the life of Ricky Kasso, a suburban teenager accused of Satanism and murder in the 1980s
- The Romanovs: An Imperial Family (Russian: Романовы. Венценосная семья) (2000) – Russian historical drama film about the last days of Tsar Nicholas II and his family
- Sade (2000) – French historical drama film about French writer, libertine, political activist and nobleman Marquis de Sade
- Saint Mary (Persian: مریم مقدس) (2000) – Iranian religious drama film depicting the life of Mary mother of Jesus based on the Quran and Islamic tradition
- Seven Songs from the Tundra (Finnish: Seitsemän laulua tundralta) (2000) – Finnish drama film based on Anastasia Lapsui's own experiences telling stories of the indigenous nomadic people of the Russian tundra under modern Communist rule
- Shadow Magic (Mandarin: 西洋鏡) (2000) – Chinese historical drama film about the introduction of motion pictures to China during the early 20th century
- Shadow of the Vampire (2000) – historical mystery film depicting a fictionalized account of the making of the classic vampire film Nosferatu, eine Symphonie des Grauens
- Spring of Life (Czech: Pramen života) (2000) – Czech historical drama film depicting a little-known operation of the Nazi SS, started just before the outbreak of World War II
- St. Patrick: The Irish Legend (2000) – British historical drama television film about the life of Saint Patrick (AD 387–463) who was born in Wales and who brought Christianity to Ireland
- The Stalking of Laurie Show (2000) – crime drama television film based on the true-life murder of Lancaster native Laurie Show
- Steal This Movie! (2000) – biographical film following Abbie Hoffman's relationship with his second wife Anita and their "awakening" and subsequent conversion to an activist life
- Thirteen Days (2000) – historical political thriller film set during the two-week Cuban Missile Crisis in October 1962, centering on how President John F. Kennedy, Attorney General Robert F. Kennedy, and others handled the explosive situation
- This Is Personal: The Hunt for the Yorkshire Ripper (2000) – British crime drama miniseries depicting a dramatisation of the real-life investigation into the notorious Yorkshire Ripper murders of the late 1970s, showing the effect that it had on the health and career of Assistant Chief Constable George Oldfield who led the enquiry
- The Three Stooges (2000) – biographical television film about the slapstick comedy team The Three Stooges
- Too Late (Portuguese: Tarde Demais) (2000) – Portuguese drama film depicting the tragic real life story of a group of Portuguese fishermen who get caught in the middle of a storm in the Tejo river and struggle to survive
- Track Down (2000) – crime thriller film about the manhunt for computer hacker Kevin Mitnick
- Two of Us (2000) – drama television film depicting a dramatized account of 24 April 1976, six years after the break-up of the Beatles and the day in which Lorne Michaels made a statement on Saturday Night Live offering the Beatles $3,000 to reunite on his program
- Vatel (2000) – French-British historical drama film based on the life of 17th-century French chef François Vatel
- Villa-Lobos: A Life of Passion (Portuguese: Villa-Lobos – Uma Vida de Paixão) (2000) – Brazilian drama film about Brazilian composer Heitor Villa-Lobos, portraying him at various ages
- The Weight of Water (2000) – American-French mystery thriller film based on the Smuttynose Island murders, which took place in 1873
- When Andrew Came Home (2000) – crime drama television film about a woman who is reunited with her kidnapped son after five years, based on a true story
- When the Sky Falls (2000) – American-British-Irish biographical crime film centring on reporter Veronica Guerin, who wrote about drug-related crime for the Sunday Independent, and her eventual murder
- Who Killed Atlanta's Children? (2000) – biographical war drama television film about the Atlanta child murders
- The Widow of Saint-Pierre (French: La veuve de Saint-Pierre) (2000) – French historical drama film telling the story of a disillusioned army officer whose love for his wife in her efforts to save a convicted murderer leads him to disobey orders, inspired by an actual case
- Word and Utopia (Portuguese: Palavra e Utopia) (2000) – Portuguese historical biographical film telling the story of Father Antonio Vieira, a 17th-century Portuguese priest who lived in Brazil and worked for better treatment of the Indians and to abolish slavery
