= List of 2001 films based on actual events =

This is a list of films and miniseries that are based on actual events. All films on this list are from American production unless indicated otherwise.

== 2001 ==
- 61* (2001) – sport drama television film about Roger Maris and Mickey Mantle's on their quest to break Babe Ruth's 1927 single-season home run record of 60 during the 1961 season of the New York Yankees
- A Beautiful Mind (2001) – biographical drama film based on the life of the American mathematician John Nash, a Nobel Laureate in Economics and Abel Prize winner
- A Glimpse of Hell (2001) – American-Canadian disaster drama film about the 1989 turret explosion incident on USS Iowa and its aftermath
- A Huey P. Newton Story (2001) – biographical drama film creating a representation of the activist Huey P. Newton's life and time as a person, a citizen and an activist
- The Affair of the Necklace (2001) – historical drama film based on what became known as the Affair of the Diamond Necklace, an incident that helped fuel the French populace's disillusionment with the monarchy and, among other causes, eventually led to the French Revolution
- The Afternoon of a Torturer (Romanian: După-amiaza unui torționar) (2001) – Romanian biographical film recounting an interview with Franț Țandără, a parricide and a torturer in the Communist jails, who openly confesses to the terrible crimes he committed in his youth
- Ali (2001) – biographical sport drama film focusing on ten years in the life of the boxer Muhammad Ali from 1964 to 1974, featuring his capture of the heavyweight title from Sonny Liston, his conversion to Islam, criticism of the Vietnam War, and banishment from boxing
- Almost a Woman (2001) – biographical television film about Esmeralda Santiago and her family who move to New York from a rural area of Puerto Rico and the challenges she and her family face
- An American Rhapsody (Hungarian: Amerikai rapszódia) (2001) – Hungarian biographical drama film telling the story of a 15-year-old girl from a Hungarian-American family, based on Éva Gárdos' life story
- Anatomy of a Hate Crime (2001) – biographical television film based on the 1998 murder of Matthew Shepard
- Anne Frank: The Whole Story (2001) – American-British-Czech biographical war miniseries based on the life of the Holocaust diarist Anne Frank
- Another Life (2001) – British crime drama film based on the true story of Edith Thompson and Frederick Bywaters of a prominent 1920s adultery–murder case, in which the pair of lovers were convicted of murdering Edith Thompson's husband
- Anybody's Nightmare (2001) – British crime drama television film based on the true story of the imprisonment of Sheila Bowler, who was accused of murdering her aunt
- As Far as My Feet Will Carry Me (German: So weit die Füße tragen) (2001) – German war film about prisoner of war Clemens Forell's escape from a Siberian Gulag in the Soviet Union back to Germany
- As White as in Snow (Swedish: Så vit som en snö) (2001) – Swedish drama film loosely inspired by the life of Elsa Andersson, the first woman aviator in Sweden
- Aśoka (2001) – Indian Hindi-language epic historical drama film about the early life of emperor Asoka, of the Maurya dynasty, who ruled most of the Indian subcontinent in the 3rd century BCE
- Attila (2001) – historical miniseries set during the waning days of the Western Roman Empire and following Attila the Hun (reigned 434–453) during his rise to power
- Band of Brothers (2001) – war drama miniseries dramatizing the history of "Easy" Company, 2nd Battalion, 506th Parachute Infantry Regiment of the 101st Airborne Division, from jump training in the United States through its participation in major actions in Europe, up until Japan's capitulation and the end of World War II
- Behind Enemy Lines (2001) – war drama film loosely based on the 1995 experiences of Scott O'Grady during the Bosnian War
- The Believer (2001) – drama film loosely based on the true story of Dan Burros, a member of the American Nazi Party and the New York branch of the United Klans of America who died by suicide after being revealed as Jewish by a reporter from The New York Times
- The Big Heist (2001) – crime drama television film telling the story of the 1978 Lufthansa heist
- Black Hawk Down (2001) – American-British war drama film documenting efforts by the Unified Task Force to capture Somali faction leader Mohamed Farrah Aidid in 1993, and the resulting battle in Mogadishu between United States forces and Aidid's militia
- Blonde (2001) – biographical drama television film depicting the life of Marilyn Monroe
- Blow (2001) – biographical crime drama film based on the real-life stories of U.S. drug trafficker George Jung and his connections including narcotics kings Pablo Escobar and Carlos Lehder Rivas, and the Medellín Cartel
- Bojangles (2001) – biographical drama television film chronicling the life of entertainer Bill "Bojangles" Robinson
- Boss of Bosses (2001) – biographical crime drama television film about the life of former Gambino crime family boss Paul Castellano
- Boycott (2001) – biographical drama television film telling the story of the 1955–1956 Montgomery bus boycott
- Brian's Song (2001) – biographical sport drama television film telling the story of Brian Piccolo, a white running back who meets, clashes with and befriends fellow Chicago Bears running back Gale Sayers
- Bride of the Wind (2001) – British-German-Austrian historical drama film loosely based on the life of Alma Mahler, recounting her marriage to the composer Gustav Mahler and her romantic liaisons
- Bully (2001) – American-French crime drama film based on the murder of Bobby Kent
- Bus 44 (Mandarin: 車四十四) (2001) – American-Hong Kong drama short film telling the story of a bus driver and her passengers' encounter with highway robbers, based on an amalgamation of supposed true events
- Camarate (2001) – Portuguese crime drama film about the investigation of the 1980 Camarate air crash
- The Cat's Meow (2001) – American-German-British mystery drama film inspired by the mysterious death of film mogul Thomas H. Ince that occurred on William Randolph Hearst's yacht during a weekend cruise celebrating Ince's birthday in November 1924
- Chūshingura 1/47 (2001) – Japanese historical drama film based on the story of the Forty-seven Ronin
- Conspiracy (2001) – war drama television film dramatizing the 1942 Wannsee Conference
- The Day Reagan Was Shot (2001) – drama television film loosely based on events surrounding the Reagan assassination attempt on March 30, 1981, by John Hinckley Jr.
- The Days of Sadat (Arabic: أيام السادات) (2001) – Egyptian biographical film about the third President of Egypt Anwar Al Sadat
- Dhyaas Parva (Marathi: ध्यास पर्व) (2001) – Indian Marathi-language biographical drama film about Raghunath Dhondo Karve
- The Diaries of Vaslav Nijinsky (2001) – Australian drama film about Vaslav Nijinsky, based on the premier danseur's published diaries
- Druids (French: Vercingétorix: La Légende du druide roi) (2001) – French-Belgian-Canadian epic historical film telling the story of the Gallic chieftain Vercingetorix, from his childhood through to his battle to save Gaul from Roman domination at the hands of Julius Caesar
- Enemy at the Gates (2001) – American-British-French-German-Irish war drama film describing the events surrounding the Battle of Stalingrad in the winter of 1942–1943
- Enigma (2001) – British-American spy thriller film about the Enigma codebreakers of Bletchley Park in the Second World War
- The Experiment (German: Das Experiment) (2001) – German drama thriller film inspired by the events of the Stanford prison experiment in the US
- February 15, 1839 (French: 15 février 1839) (2001) – Canadian French-language historical drama film about the incarceration at the Pied-du-Courant Prison and the execution by hanging there of Patriote participants of the Lower Canada Rebellion
- From Hell (2001) – American-British-Czech historical horror film about the Jack the Ripper murders
- The Grey Zone (2001) – historical war drama film telling the story of the Jewish Sonderkommando XII in the Auschwitz death camp in October 1944
- H Story (2001) – Japanese biographical drama film about an attempt to remake Alain Resnais' 1959 film Hiroshima Mon Amour
- H3 (2001) – Irish biographical drama film about the 1981 Irish hunger strike at HM Prison Maze in Northern Ireland, the events leading up to it, and subsequent developments in the prisoners' struggle for Prisoner of War status
- Hot Money (2001) – British crime drama television film inspired by the Loughton incinerator thefts
- In the Time of the Butterflies (2001) – American-Mexican drama film depicting a fictionalized account of the lives of the Mirabal sisters, Dominican revolutionary activists, who opposed the dictatorship of Rafael Trujillo and were assassinated on November 25, 1960
- Inch'Allah Dimanche (Arabic: إن شاء الله الأحد) (2001) – French-Algerian drama film about the life of an Algerian immigrant woman in France, largely based on Yamina Benguigui's experience moving to France and the struggles for autonomy Algerian women continue to face even today
- Inside the Osmonds (2001) – biographical musical drama film about the personal lives and professional careers of The Osmonds, and how the stresses and strains of their careers and the turbulent 1970s and 1980s affected their relationships with each other and their families
- Invincible (German: Unbesiegbar) (2001) – American-British-Irish-German drama film based on the story of Zishe Breitbart
- Iris (2001) – biographical drama film about novelist Iris Murdoch and her relationship with her husband John Bayley
- Jackie, Ethel, Joan: The Women of Camelot (2001) – biographical drama miniseries about the eponymous Kennedys; Jacqueline Kennedy Onassis, Ethel Kennedy and Joan Bennett Kennedy
- James Dean (2001) – biographical drama television film based on the life of the American actor James Dean
- Judas (Italian: Gli amici di Gesù – Giuda) (2001) – Italian-German Christian drama television film telling the story of Judas Iscariot
- Just Ask My Children (2001) – historical drama television film recounting the true story of the Kern County child abuse cases
- Kandahar (Dari: قندهار) (2001) – Iranian drama film based on a partly true, partly fictionalized story of Nafas, a successful Afghan-Canadian woman, set in Afghanistan during the rule of the Taliban
- The Lady and the Duke (French: L'Anglaise et le Duc) (2001) – French-German historical romantic drama film about Grace Elliott, a Scottish royalist caught up in the political intrigue following the French Revolution
- The Legend of Suriyothai (Thai: สุริโยไท) (2001) – Thai biographical drama film portraying the life of Queen Suriyothai, who is regarded by Thai people as the "great feminist"
- Leo & Claire (German: Leo und Claire) (2001) – German historical drama film depicting the story behind the Katzenberger Trial
- Let's Get Skase (2001) – Australian comedy film based on the life of failed Australian businessman Christopher Skase, who after the collapse of his Qintex business fled to Mallorca, Spain
- Life with Judy Garland: Me and My Shadows (2001) – biographical miniseries chronicling Judy Garland's life from her first public performance in 1924 until her death in 1969
- The Lost Battalion (2001) – war drama television film about the US 77th Division's Lost Battalion during World War I, which was cut off and surrounded by German forces in the Argonne Forest during the Meuse-Argonne Offensive of 1918
- Mad Love (Spanish: Juana la Loca) (2001) – Spanish-Italian-Portuguese historical drama film following the tragic fate of Queen Joanna of Castile, madly in love with an unfaithful husband, Philip the Handsome, Archduke of Austria
- The Manns – Novel of a Century (German: Die Manns – Ein Jahrhundertroman) (2001) – German biographical drama miniseries telling the story of the Mann family
- The Marriage of Gustav III (Swedish: Gustav III:s äktenskap) (2001) – Swedish historical miniseries built upon a period in the life of King Gustav III of Sweden
- The Miracle of the Cards (2001) – biographical drama television film based on the true story of English youngster Craig Shergold, who in 1988 is diagnosed with a brain tumor
- Mockingbird Don't Sing (2001) – biographical film based on the true story of Genie, a modern-day feral child
- The Moonhunter (Thai: 14 ตุลา สงครามประชาชน) (2001) – Thai biographical film depicting the 1973 Thai popular uprising by Seksan Prasertkul, a student leader
- The Moving True Story of a Woman Ahead of Her Time (West Frisian: Nynke) (2001) – Dutch historical drama film about the lives of Nienke van Hichtum and Dutch socialist and politician Pieter Jelles Troelstra
- My Sassy Girl (Korean: 엽기적인 그녀) (2001) – South Korean romantic comedy film based on a true story told in a series of blog posts written by Kim Ho-sik
- Nowhere in Africa (German: Nirgendwo in Afrika) (2001) – German drama film based on the 1995 autobiographical novel of the same name by Stefanie Zweig, describing her German-Jewish family's experiences living in Kenya having emigrated there in 1938 to escape persecution in Nazi Germany
- One Night the Moon (2001) – Australian musical drama film based on the true story of a young girl who went missing in the Australian outback in 1932
- The Other Side of Heaven (2001) – adventure drama film showcasing John H. Groberg's experiences as a missionary of the Church of Jesus Christ of Latter-day Saints in the Tongan islands in the 1950s
- Piñero (2001) – biographical drama film about the troubled life of Nuyorican poet and playwright Miguel Piñero
- The Princess and the Marine (2001) – romantic drama television film based on the true story of American Marine Jason Johnson and Bahraini Princess Meriam Al-Khalifa
- The Profession of Arms (Italian: l mestiere delle armi) (2001) – Italian historical drama film depicting the life and death of Giovanni delle Bande Nere
- Prozac Nation (2001) – American-German psychological drama film based on Elizabeth Wurtzel's 1994 memoir of the same name, which describes Wurtzel's experiences with atypical depression
- Quitting (Mandarin: 昨天) (2001) – Chinese drama film based on the true life story of Jia Hongsheng, an actor and former drug addict who battled his addiction to marijuana and heroin for five years from 1992 to 1997
- Race to Space (2001) – family drama film about the 1960s space race between the United States and the Soviet Union
- Riding in Cars with Boys (2001) – biographical drama film based on the autobiography of the same name by Beverly Donofrio, about a woman who overcame difficulties, including being a teen mother, and who later earned a master's degree
- Roberto Succo (2001) – French biographical drama film based on the true story of the eponymous Italian serial killer Roberto Succo
- Rock Star (2001) – musical comedy drama film inspired by the real-life story of Tim "Ripper" Owens, a singer in a Judas Priest tribute band who was chosen to replace singer Rob Halford when he temporarily left the band
- The Rose of the Rascal (Finnish: Rentun Ruusu) (2001) – Finnish biographical drama film based on the life of Antti Yrjö Hammarberg
- Satoshi: A Move for Tomorrow (Japanese: 聖の青春) (2001) – Japanese drama film portraying the life of Satoshi Murayama, who was a professional shogi player
- Silent Grace (2001) – Irish crime drama film covering the untold story of Republican women prisoners involvement in the 1980/81 Dirty Protest and first hunger strike
- The Six Wives of Henry VIII (2001) – British historical drama miniseries about the wives of Henry VIII
- Sword of Honour (2001) – British drama television film loosely based on Evelyn Waugh's experiences in the Second World War
- Taking Sides (German: Der Fall Furtwängler) (2001) – German-Austrian-French-British biographical drama film based on the real interrogations that took place between a U.S. Army investigator and the musical conductor Wilhelm Furtwängler, who had been charged with serving the Nazi regime
- Taurus (Russian: Телец) (2001) – Russian biographical drama film about former Russian politician Vladimir Lenin
- There Is a Secret in My Soup (Cantonese: 人頭豆腐湯) (2001) – Hong Kong crime horror film based on the Hello Kitty murder
- Things Behind the Sun (2001) – biographical drama film based on an early adolescent experience of Allison Anders
- Thomas (Italian: Gli amici di Gesù – Tommaso) (2001) – Italian Christian drama television film telling the story of Thomas the Apostle
- Time Out (French: L'Emploi du temps) (2001) – French drama film loosely based on the life story of Jean-Claude Romand
- To End All Wars (2001) – war drama film based on Through the Valley of the Kwai, an autobiography of Ernest Gordon, then a Scottish Captain, later the Presbyterian Dean of the Princeton University Chapel
- Tomorrow (Italian: Domani) (2001) – Italian disaster drama film about the aftermath of the 1997 Umbria and Marche earthquake
- The Tunnel (German: Der Tunnel) (2001) – German drama television film based on true events in Berlin following the closing of the East German border in August 1961 and the subsequent construction of the Berlin Wall
- Uprising (2001) – war drama television film about the Warsaw Ghetto Uprising during the Holocaust
- Varian's War (2001) – Canadian-British-American drama television film based on the life and wartime exploits of Varian Fry who saved more than 2,000 Jewish artists from Vichy France, the conquered ally of Nazi Germany
- Veer Savarkar (Hindi: वीर सावरकर) (2001) – Indian Hindi-language biographical film based on the life of Vinayak Damodar Savarkar
- Vera Brühne (2001) – German drama miniseries about Vera Brühne who was convicted of murder
- Victoria & Albert (2001) – British historical miniseries focusing on the early life and marriage of Queen Victoria and Prince Albert
- What Makes a Family (2001) – drama television film about a lesbian couple living in Florida who choose to have a child, based on a true story
- When Billie Beat Bobby (2001) – sport comedy drama film detailing the historic 1973 "Battle of the Sexes" tennis match between Billie Jean King and Bobby Riggs and what led up to it
- Witness of Truth: The Railway Murders (2001) – British biographical crime drama film dramatizing the crimes committed by John Duffy and David Mulcahy, commonly known as the Railway Rapists or Railway Killers
- Zubeidaa (Hindi: ज़ुबैदा; Urdu: زبیدہ) (2001) – Indian Hindi- and Urdu-language biographical drama film based on the life of the ill-fated actress Zubeida Begum, who married Hanwant Singh of Jodhpur and was the mother of the film's writer, Khalid Mohamed
