= List of 2004 films based on actual events =

This is a list of films and miniseries that are based on actual events. All films on this list are from American production unless indicated otherwise.

== 2004 ==
- 3: The Dale Earnhardt Story (2004) – biographical drama television film about the life and death of legendary NASCAR driver Dale Earnhardt
- The 7th Day (Spanish: El 7º día) (2004) – Spanish-French drama film based on the Puerto Hurraco massacre
- 12 Days of Terror (2004) – South African biographical horror film revolving around the 1916 Jersey shark attacks, as recounted in the book of the same name by Richard Fernicola, in which a juvenile great white shark begins a series of attacks that takes place of the course of 12 days in New Jersey
- 18-J (2004) – Argentine anthology drama film focusing on the July 18, 1994, bombing of the AMIA Building in Buenos Aires, where 86 people were killed and 300 others wounded
- 36 (French: 36 Quai des Orfèvres) (2004) – French action thriller film loosely inspired from real events which occurred during the 1980s in France known as the gang des postiches arrest
- 100 Minutes of Glory (Croatian: Sto minuta Slave) (2004) – Croatian biographical drama film telling the story of Slava Raškaj, a turn-of-the-century artist, often described as Croatian Frida Kahlo
- A Bear Named Winnie (2004) – drama television film concerning one of the real-life inspirations behind A.A. Milne's Winnie The Pooh
- Against the Ropes (2004) – sport drama film depicting a fictionalized account of boxing manager Jackie Kallen, the first woman to achieve success in the sport
- Agatha Christie: A Life in Pictures (2004) – British biographical drama television film telling the life story of the British crime-writer Agatha Christie in her words
- The Alamo (2004) – war historical drama film about the Battle of the Alamo during the Texas Revolution
- Alexander (2004) – epic historical drama film based on the life of the ancient Macedonian general and king Alexander the Great
- The Aryan Couple (2004) – British-American historical drama film loosely based on the life events of Hungarian Jewish industrialist Manfred Weiss and his Manfréd Weiss Steel and Metal Works
- The Assassination of Richard Nixon (2004) – American-Mexican crime drama film depicting the story of would-be assassin Samuel Byck, who plotted to kill Richard Nixon in 1974
- The Aviator (2004) – American-German epic biographical film depicting the story of aviator Howard Hughes
- Ay Juancito (2004) – Argentine biographical drama film about the life of Juan Duarte, Eva Perón's brother and a political officer during Juan Domingo Perón's first presidency
- Baby for Sale (2004) – American-Canadian drama television film about a couple who discover the baby they are trying to adopt is being sold, based on true events
- Behind the Camera: The Unauthorized Story of Charlie's Angels (2004) – biographical drama television film documenting the success of the series Charlie's Angels, as well as the interpersonal conflicts that occurred among its staff and cast
- Bettie Page: Dark Angel (2004) – biographical drama film based on the career of Bettie Page, a famous American 1950s pin-up and bondage model
- Beyond the Front Line (Finnish: Etulinjan edessä) (2004) – Finnish war film based on the diaries of Swedish-speaking Finnish soldiers who served in the Continuation War in 1942–1944
- Beyond the Sea (2004) – biographical musical drama film based on the life of singer-actor Bobby Darin
- Bittersweet Memories (French: Ma vie en cinémascope) (2004) – Canadian French-language biographical drama film depicting the career of Quebec singer Alys Robi
- Black Friday (Hindi: ब्लैक फ्राइडे) (2004) – Indian Hindi-language crime drama film about the 1993 Bombay bombings, chronicling the events that led to the blasts and the subsequent police investigation
- The Blue Butterfly (French: Le papillon bleu) (2004) – Canadian adventure drama film based on the life of David Marenger and his trip with entomologist Georges Brossard in 1987
- Bobby Jones: Stroke of Genius (2004) – biographical sport drama film based on the life of golfer Bobby Jones, the only player in the sport to win all four of the men's major golf championships in a single season
- Call Me: The Rise and Fall of Heidi Fleiss (2004) – biographical drama television film about the life of Heidi Fleiss
- The Captives (2004) – historical war film based on the true story of Mary Draper Ingles and her struggles during the French-Indian War
- Cazuza: Time Doesn't Stop (Portuguese: Cazuza: O Tempo Não Pára) (2004) – Brazilian biographical musical drama film about the life of singer Cazuza
- The Chorus (French: Les Choristes) (2004) – French-German-Swiss musical drama film inspired by the origin of the boys' choir the Little Singers of Paris
- Chrysalis (Hindi: काया तारन) (2004) – Indian Hindi-language action drama film set against the backdrop of 2002 Gujarat riots against Muslims and 1984 anti-Sikh riots
- The Clearing (2004) – thriller drama film loosely based on the real life kidnapping of Gerrit Jan Heijn that took place in the Netherlands in 1987
- Clouds After Cloud (Bengali: মেঘের পরে মেঘ) (2004) – Bangladeshi historical war film based on the events of the Bangladesh Liberation War
- Colette, A Free Woman (French: Colette, une femme libre) (2004) – French biographical miniseries exploring the life of Colette
- Concrete (Japanese: コンクリート) (2004) – Japanese crime drama film based on the case of the murder of Junko Furuta
- Crutch (2004) – biographical drama film about a young man's struggle with family problems and substance abuse, based on the experiences of writer-director Rob Moretti
- De-Lovely (2004) – musical biographical film based on the life and career of Cole Porter, from his first meeting with his wife, Linda Lee Thomas, until his death
- Downfall (German: Der Untergang) (2004) – historical war drama film set during the Battle of Berlin in World War II, when Nazi Germany is on the verge of defeat, and depicting the final days of Adolf Hitler
- Drum (2004) – South African biographical film based on the life of South African investigative journalist Henry Nxumalo, who worked for Drum magazine, called "the first black lifestyle magazine in Africa"
- Dunkirk (2004) – British war miniseries about the Battle of Dunkirk and the Dunkirk evacuation in World War II
- Edelweiss Pirates (German: Edelweisspiraten) (2004) – German historical war film telling the story of a group of rebellious teenage German boys opposed to the war and Nazism, based on actual events
- Evel Knievel (2004) – biographical drama film based on the life and career of Evel Knievel
- Evilenko (2004) – Italian crime horror film loosely based on the Soviet serial killer Andrei Chikatilo
- Father of Mercy (Italian: Don Gnocchi – L'angelo dei bimbi) (2004) – Italian biographical television film based on real life events of Roman Catholic priest and then Blessed Carlo Gnocchi
- Fighter in the Wind (Korean: 바람의 파이터) (2004) – South Korean biographical drama film depicting a fictionalized account of karate competitor Choi Yeung-Eui who went to Japan during World War II to become a fighter pilot but found a very different path instead
- Finding Neverland (2004) – British-American biographical fantasy film depicting the story of Sir James Matthew Barrie's friendship with a family who inspired him to create Peter Pan
- First Love (Italian: Primo Amore) (2004) – Italian biographical drama film loosely based on the autobiographical novel by Marco Mariolini
- Friday Night Lights (2004) – sport drama film adapted from Friday Night Lights: A Town, a Team, and a Dream by H. G. Bissinger, about the 1988 football season of Permian High School in Odessa, Texas
- Garden State (2004) – comedy drama film based on Zach Braff's real life experiences
- Gracie's Choice (2004) – crime drama television film about a teenage girl who trues to raise her four siblings after their drug-addicted mother is sent to jail, inspired by a true story
- Gunpowder, Treason & Plot (2004) – British historical drama television film based upon the lives of Mary, Queen of Scots and her son James VI of Scotland
- The Hamburg Cell (2004) – British-Canadian biographical drama television film describing the creation of the Hamburg cell, Islamist and extremist group composed by the terrorists that piloted the airplanes hijacked during the September 11 attacks
- Hawking (2004) – British biographical drama television film chronicling Stephen Hawking's early years as a PhD student at the University of Cambridge, following his search for the beginning of time, and his struggle against motor neuron disease
- Helter Skelter – crime drama television film based on the 1974 non-fiction book by Vincent Bugliosi and Curt Gentry about the murders of the Manson Family
- Hidalgo (2004) – American-Moroccan epic biographical Western based on the legend of the American distance rider Frank Hopkins and his mustang Hidalgo
- The Hillside Strangler (2004) – horror film based on the true story of Kenneth Bianchi and Angelo Buono Jr., the Hillside Strangler serial killers
- Homeland Security (2004) – drama television film about the creation of the United States Department of Homeland Security in response to the September 11 attacks
- Hotel Rwanda (2004) – American-British-Italian-South African biographical drama film based on the Rwandan genocide, which occurred during the spring of 1994, documenting Paul Rusesabagina's efforts to save the lives of his family and more than 1,000 other refugees by providing them with shelter in the besieged Hôtel des Mille Collines
- Hours of Light (Spanish: Horas de luz) (2004) – Spanish romantic prison film tracking the real life romantic relationship established in 1991 between prison nurse María del Mar "Marimar" Villar and Juan José Garfia, imprisoned because of the cold-blood murder of three in 1987
- Hustle (2004) – sport drama television film about the baseball player Pete Rose, following as he gambled on Major League Baseball while managing the Cincinnati Reds, got caught and was banned from baseball for life
- Identity Theft (2004) – crime drama television film based on the true story of Michelle Brown who has her identity stolen and $50,000 purchased under her name
- Ike: Countdown to D-Day (2004) – historical war drama television film dramatizing the 90 days leading up to Operation Overlord
- Innocent Voices (Spanish: Voces inocentes) (2004) – Mexican-Salvadorian war drama film set during the Salvadoran Civil War, and based on writer Óscar Torres's childhood
- Iron Jawed Angels (2004) – historical drama film focusing on the American women's suffrage movement during the 1910s and follows women's suffrage leaders Alice Paul and Lucy Burns as they use peaceful and effective nonviolent strategies, tactics, and dialogues to revolutionize the American feminist movement to grant women the right to vote
- Judas (2004) – Christian drama miniseries depicting the intertwined lives of Judas Iscariot and Jesus of Nazareth
- Kamaraj (Tamil: காமராஜ்) (2004) – Italian Tamil-language biographical film about the life of the Indian politician K. Kamaraj from Tamil Nadu, widely acknowledged as the "Kingmaker" in Indian politics during the 1960s
- Kekexili: Mountain Patrol (Mandarin: 可可西里; Tibetan: ཨ་ཆེན་གངས་རྒྱབ།) (2004) – Chinese action drama film depicting a moving true story about volunteers protecting antelope against poachers in the severe mountains of Tibet
- Killer Shikder (Bengali: খুনী শিকদার) (2004) – Bangladeshi biographical thriller film based on the life of the Bangladeshi notorious murderer Ershad Sikder
- Kinsey (2004) – biographical drama film describing the life of Alfred Charles Kinsey, a pioneer in the area of sexology
- The Last Shot (2004) – action comedy film loosely based on the true story of an FBI sting operation code-named Dramex which was run by FBI agent Garland Schweickhardt, who recruited aspiring screenwriters Dan Lewk and Gary Levy to participate unwittingly in a sting operation aimed at ensnaring mobsters and Teamsters union officials in a bribery scheme
- The Libertine (2004) – British-Australian historical drama film chronicling the life of the decadent but brilliant Earl of Rochester, who is asked by King Charles II to write a play celebrating his reign, while simultaneously training Elizabeth Barry to improve her acting
- The Life and Death of Peter Sellers (2004) – British-American biographical drama television film about the life of English comedian Peter Sellers
- Love (Tamil: காதல்) (2004) – Indian Tamil-language romantic drama film based on a true love story
- The Love Crimes of Gillian Guess (2004) – Canadian drama television film loosely based on the real-life story of Gillian Guess, who was convicted of obstruction of justice in 1998 after she became romantically involved with an accused murderer while serving as a juror at his trial
- Love in Thoughts (German: Was nützt die Liebe in Gedanken) (2004) – German drama film inspired by the Steglitz school tragedy of 1927
- Luisa Sanfelice (2004) – Italian historical drama film about the life of Luisa Sanfelice, a young member of the Neapolitan nobility who is in love with a republican, Salvato Palmieri
- Machuca (2004) – Chilean-Spanish-British-French coming-of-age drama film depicting the months leading up to the 1973 coup d'état led by General Augusto Pinochet
- Man in the Mirror: The Michael Jackson Story (2004) – American-Canadian biographical drama television film about American pop star Michael Jackson, and following his rise to fame and subsequent events
- Miracle (2004) – sport drama film about the United States men's ice hockey team, led by head coach Herb Brooks who won the gold medal in the 1980 Winter Olympics
- Miracle Run (2004) – biographical drama television film about a single mother whose fraternal twin sons are both diagnosed with autism, based on a true story
- Modigliani (2004) – international co-production biographical drama film based on the life of the Italian artist Amedeo Modigliani
- The Motorcycle Diaries (Spanish: Diarios de motocicleta) (2004) – international co-production biographical film about the journey and written memoir of the 23-year-old Ernesto Guevara, who would several years later become internationally known as the Marxist guerrilla leader and revolutionary leader Che Guevara
- My Nikifor (Polish: Mój Nikifor) (2004) – Polish biographical drama film based on the life of Nikifor, a folk and naïve painter
- The Mystery of Natalie Wood (2004) – biographical drama miniseries chronicling the life and career of actress Natalie Wood from her early childhood in the 1940s until her death in 1981
- Nero (2004) – British-Italian-Spanish historical television film about Emperor Nero
- Netaji Subhas Chandra Bose: The Forgotten Hero (2004) – Indian English-language epic biographical war film depicting the life of the Indian Independence leader Subhas Chandra Bose in Nazi Germany: 1941–1943, and in Japanese-occupied Asia 1943–1945, and the events leading to the formation of Azad Hind Fauj
- The Ninth Day (German: Der neunte Tag) (2004) – German historical drama film about a Catholic priest from Luxembourg who is imprisoned in Dachau concentration camp, but released for nine days, loosely based on Jean Bernard's prison diary
- Nobody Knows (Japanese: 誰も知らない) (2004) – Japanese crime drama film based on the 1988 Sugamo child abandonment case
- Not Only But Always (2004) – British biographical television film telling the story of the working and personal relationship between the comedians Peter Cook and Dudley Moore, a hugely popular duo in the UK during the 1960s and 1970s
- Olga (2004) – Brazilian biographical drama film chronicling the German Jew Olga Benário Prestes' life and times
- Omagh (2004) – Irish crime drama film dramatizing the events surrounding the Omagh bombing and its aftermath
- The Overture (Thai: โหมโรง) (2004) – Thai musical drama film based on the life story of Thai palace musician Luang Pradit Phairoh, from the late 19th century to the 1940s
- The Passion of the Christ (2004) – Christian epic drama film depicting the Passion of Jesus largely according to the gospels of Matthew, Mark, Luke, and John
- The Perfect Husband: The Laci Peterson Story (2004) – crime drama television film based on the murder of Laci Peterson
- The Preacher (Dutch: De Dominee) (2004) – Dutch thriller film based on the life of real-life drug lord Klaas Bruinsma
- Prom Queen: The Marc Hall Story (2004) – Canadian biographical drama television film about Marc Hall, a gay Canadian teenager whose legal fight (Marc Hall v. Durham Catholic School Board) to bring a same-sex date to his Catholic high school prom made headlines in 2002
- Ray (2004) – biographical musical drama film focusing on 30 years in the life of rhythm and blues musician Ray Charles
- Redemption: The Stan Tookie Williams Story (2004) – biographical crime drama television film dealing with the life of Stanley Tookie Williams, the co-founding member of the Crips street gang
- The Remains of Nothing (Italian: Il resto di niente) (2004) – Italian historical drama film following the travails of an idealistic noblewoman who helps lead a daring revolution in Italy
- Rikidōzan (Korean: 역도산; Japanese: 力道山) (2004) – South Korean-Japanese sport drama film based on the life of Rikidōzan, a legendary ethnic Korean professional wrestler who became a national hero in Japan in the 1950s
- The Riverman (2004) – biographical crime drama television film following real life incidents around how convicted infamous serial killer Ted Bundy helps detectives Robert D. Keppel and Dave Reichert by providing insights into the mind of a psychopath killer to catch then active murderer Green River Killer aka Gary Ridgway
- The Rocket Post (2004) – British drama film loosely based on experiments in 1934 by the German inventor Gerhard Zucker to provide a postal service to the island of Scarp by rocket mail
- Romasanta (2004) – Spanish-British-Italian horror film based on the true story of Manuel Blanco Romasanta, Spain's first documented serial killer
- Saint John Bosco: Mission to Love (2004) – Italian biographical television film based on real life events of Roman Catholic priest John Bosco
- Saint Rita (Italian: Rita da Cascia) (2004) – Italian biographical drama film based on real life events of Augustinian nun and Saint Rita of Cascia
- The Sea Inside (Spanish: Mar adentro) (2004) – Spanish psychological drama film based on the real-life story of Ramón Sampedro, who was left quadriplegic after a diving accident, and his 28-year campaign in support of euthanasia and the right to end his life
- Shegavicha Rana Gajanan (Marathi: शेगावीचा राणा गजानन) (2004) – Indian Marathi-language biographical film about the Indian Hindu guru, saint and mystic, Gajanan Maharaj
- Soba (2004) – Mexican crime film based on the true story of three girls raped by a group of cops in Tláhuac, Mexico City
- Something the Lord Made (2004) – biographical drama television film about the black cardiac pioneer Vivien Thomas and his complex and volatile partnership with white surgeon Alfred Blalock, the "Blue Baby doctor" who pioneered modern heart surgery
- Spartacus (2004) – biographical historical miniseries about the life of Thracian gladiator Spartacus
- Stage Beauty (2004) – German-British-American romantic historical film inspired by references to 17th-century actor Edward Kynaston made in the detailed private diary kept by Samuel Pepys
- Stauffenberg (2004) – German-Austrian historical television film about Claus Schenk Graf von Stauffenberg and the 20 July 1944 plot to assassinate Adolf Hitler
- Suburban Madness (2004) – crime drama television film based on a true story of the Murder of David Lynn Harris
- The Terminal (2004) – comedy drama film inspired by the true story of the 18-year stay of Mehran Karimi Nasseri in Terminal 1 of Paris Charles de Gaulle Airport, France, from 1988 to 2006
- Through My Eyes (2004) – Australian crime drama miniseries based upon the memoirs of Lindy Chamberlain-Creighton, whose nine-week-old baby Azaria was taken by a dingo from her family's tent near Uluru in Australia's remote Northern Territory
- Tiger Cruise (2004) – biographical television film depicting real-life events of the September 11 attacks in which USS Constellation was, as depicted, actually returning from her 2001 Western Pacific deployment with "tigers" on board when the September 11 terrorist attacks occurred
- Trilogy: The Weeping Meadow (Greek: Τριλογία: Το λιβάδι που δακρύζει) (2004) – Greek historical drama film telling the story of Greek history, from 1919 to the aftermath of World War II, through the sufferings of one family
- Troy (2004) – American-British-Maltese epic historical war film following the assault on Troy by the united Greek forces and chronicling the fates of the men involved
- The Unburied Man (Hungarian: A temetetlen halott) (2004) – Hungarian-Slovak-Polish biographical drama film based on the life of former Prime Minister of Hungary, Imre Nagy, who was executed following the failed Hungarian Revolution of 1956
- Utterly Alone (Lithuanian: Vienui Vieni) (2004) – Lithuanian historical film based on real events, about Juozas Lukša (code name Daumantas), a Lithuanian partisan who fought against the Soviet occupation of Lithuania in the years immediately following World War II
- Virginia, The Nun of Monza (2004) – Italian-Spanish historical drama television film loosely based on real life events of Marianna de Leyva, better known as "The Nun of Monza", whose story was made famous by Alessandro Manzoni's novel The Betrothed
- Whisky Romeo Zulu (2004) – Argentine drama film based on the experiences of Enrique Piñeyro, former airline pilot turned whistle-blower, who became a film actor-director, and of the August 31, 1999 LAPA (Líneas Aéreas Privadas Argentinas) airline accident
- Zapata (Spanish: Zapata: el sueño del héroe) (2004) – Mexican biographical drama film depicting a fictionalized portrayal of Emiliano Zapata
