= List of 2011 films based on actual events =

This is a list of films and miniseries released in 2011 that are based on actual events. All films on this list are from American production unless indicated otherwise.

== 2011 ==
- 17 Miracles (2011) – historical adventure film based on the alleged experiences of members of the Willie Handcart Company of Mormon pioneers following their late-season start and subsequent winter journey to Salt Lake City in 1856
- 30 Minutes or Less (2011) – action comedy drama film loosely inspired by the Brian Wells case
- 50/50 (2011) – comedy drama film loosely based on the life of screenwriter Will Reiser
- 96 Minutes (2011) – crime thriller film telling the true story of a traumatic car-jacking that results in the destruction of four teenagers' lives
- 1911 (Mandarin: 辛亥革命) (2011) – Chinese historical drama film based on the 1911 Revolution and Xinhai Revolution
- A Dangerous Method (2011) – Canadian-German-British historical drama film set on the eve of World War I, describing the turbulent relationships between Carl Jung, founder of analytical psychology; Sigmund Freud, founder of the discipline of psychoanalysis; and Sabina Spielrein, initially a patient of Jung and later a physician and one of the first female psychoanalysts
- A Funny Man (Danish: Dirch) (2011) – Danish biographical drama film about the Danish actor and comedian Dirch Passer
- A Yell from Heaven (Japanese: 天国からのエール) (2011) – Japanese drama film inspired by the true story of Hikaru Oshiro, an Okinawan altruist who founded the "Ajisai Ongaku Mura", a music village that is open for all to use
- Age of Heroes (2011) – British war film based on the real-life events of the formation of Ian Fleming's 30 Commando unit during World War II
- Amanda Knox: Murder on Trial in Italy (2011) – biographical crime television film based on the murder of Meredith Kercher and the trial of the accused of Amanda Knox
- Anonymous (2011) – German-American historical drama film depicting a fictionalised version of the life of Edward de Vere, 17th Earl of Oxford an Elizabethan courtier, playwright, poet and patron of the arts, and suggests that he was the actual author of William Shakespeare's plays
- Atlantis (2011) – British biographical drama television film portraying events surrounding the volcanic eruption which destroyed the island of Thera, an incident portrayed as having inspired the parable of Atlantis
- Bernie (2011) – biographical black comedy crime film based on the 1996 murder of 81-year-old millionaire Marjorie Nugent in Carthage, Texas, by her 39-year-old companion Bernie Tiede
- Beyond the Blackboard (2011) – biographical television film based on Stacey Bess's experiences of teaching at a school for homeless children known as "The School With No Name"
- Black Butterflies (2011) – Dutch biographical drama film about the life of South-African Afrikaans poet and anti-apartheid political dissident Ingrid Jonker
- Blackthorn (2011) – Spanish-Bolivian-British-French Western film depiciting a fictionalized account of an aged Butch Cassidy living under the assumed name James Blackthorn in a secluded village in Bolivia 20 years after his disappearance in 1908
- The Broken Tower (2011) – biographical drama film about American poet Hart Crane
- Christopher and His Kind (2011) – British biographical television film depicting Christopher Isherwood's exploits in Berlin in the early 1930s
- Cinema Verite (2011) – biographical drama television film depicting a fictionalized account of the production of An American Family, a 1973 PBS documentary television series that is said to be one of the earliest examples of the reality television genre
- Citizen Gangster (2011) – Canadian biographical drama film based on the true story of Canadian gangster and alleged murderer Edwin Alonzo Boyd
- Clara Campoamor, The Forgotten Woman (Spanish: Clara Campoamor, la mujer olvidada) (2011) – Spanish historical biographical television film following Clara Campoamor's struggle for women's active suffrage in the parliamentary meetings of the Cortes, where she convinced the majority of the house of her cause
- Confessions of a Brazilian Call Girl (Portuguese: Bruna Surfistinha) (2011) – Brazilian biographical erotic drama film about the life of Bruna Surfistinha
- The Conquest (French: La conquête) (2011) – French biographical comedy drama film about Nicolas Sarkozy
- The Craigslist Killer (2011) – crime drama television film inspired by the true story of a man named Philip Markoff who killed one woman and is known to have assaulted at least two others in Massachusetts and Rhode Island
- Crulic: The Path to Beyond (Romanian: Crulic - Drumul spre dincolo) (2011) – Romanian-Polish animated biographical film telling the story of Claudiu Crulic, a Romanian citizen who died in a Polish prison while on a hunger strike
- The Cup (2011) – Australian biographical film about Damien Oliver's victory in the 2002 Melbourne Cup
- Dam 999 (2011) – Indian-Emirati disaster film based on the Banqiao dam disaster of 1975 that claimed the lives of 250,000 people in China and anticipated calamity for outdated dams in the world
- Dear Friend Hitler (Hindi: प्रिय मित्र हिटलर) (2011) – Indian Hindi-language war drama film based on letters written by Mohandes Gandhi to the leader of the Nazi Party and Chancellor of Germany Adolf Hitler
- The Devil's Double (2011) – Belgian-Dutch biographical film based on the life of Latif Yahia, body double for Uday Hussein, the playboy son of Iraqi president Saddam Hussein
- Diaries of Letters to God (Indonesian: Surat Kecil untuk Tuhan) (2011) – Indonesian biographical drama film based on the true story of Gita Sesa Wanda Cantika, a 15-year-old student who was diagnosed with and on 25 December 2006 died of the first reported case of Rhabdomyosarcoma in Indonesia
- The Dirty Picture (Hindi: गंदा चित्र) (2011) – Indian Hindi-language biographical film based on the life of Silk Smitha, a South Indian actress known for her erotic roles
- Dolphin Tale (2011) – family drama film inspired by the true story of a bottlenose dolphin named Winter who was rescued off the Florida coast and taken in by the Clearwater Marine Aquarium, where she is fitted with a prosthetic tail
- The Eagle (2011) – British-American epic historical drama film based on the Ninth Spanish Legion's supposed disappearance in Britain
- The Fields (2011) – thriller film loosely based on the life of screenwriter Harrison Smith as a boy growing up on a grandparents' farm on the outskirts of Easton, Pennsylvania
- Free Man (Turkish: Hür Adam: Bediüzzaman Said Nursi) (2011) – Turkish biographical film about the life of influential Muslim scholar Said Nursî
- Free Men (French: Les Hommes libres) (2011) – French war drama film which recounts the largely untold story about the role that Algerian and other North African Muslims in Paris played in the French Resistance and as rescuers of Jews during the German occupation
- From the Rough (2011) – sports drama film based on the true story of Catana Starks, a former Tennessee State Tigers swim coach, who became the first woman ever to coach a college men's golf team
- Funkytown (2011) – Canadian drama film depicting a fictionalized version of Montreal's famed Lime Light discothèque
- Gerry (2011) – Canadian biographical film about rock singer Gerry Boulet from Saint-Jean-sur-Richelieu, Quebec
- Girl Fight (2011) – biographical television film inspired by a 2008 beating in Florida; a video of some of the beating, released by Polk County Sheriff Grady Judd, was used heavily by the news media and the story caused nationwide public outrage
- Guilty (French: Présumé coupable) (2011) – French biographical drama film about the Outreau trial
- Hattie (2011) – British biographical television film about the life of British comic actress Hattie Jacques, her marriage to John Le Mesurier and her affair with their lodger John Schofield
- Heleno (2011) – Brazilian biographical drama film telling the story of Heleno de Freitas, a legendary football star who played for Botafogo during the 1940s
- Higher Ground (2011) – drama film following the true story of Corinne Walker and her vacillating relationship with Christianity
- Holy Flying Circus (2011) - Television Comedy film dramatizing the broadcasting events of Monty Python's Life of Brian
- Hysteria (2011) - British historical romantic comedy film depicting how the medical management of hysteria led to the invention of the vibrator
- If Not Us, Who? (German: Wer wenn nicht wir) (2011) – German biographical drama film depicting the story of star-crossed lovers, Gudrun Ensslin and Bernward Vesper, and the Protests of 1968
- The Intouchables (French: Intouchables) (2011) – French buddy comedy drama film inspired by the true story of Philippe Pozzo di Borgo and his French-Algerian caregiver Abdel Sellou
- Invisible (Hebrew: לו רוים עלייך) (2011) – Israeli crime drama film based on a series of rapes that occurred in Tel Aviv during 1977–1978
- The Iron Lady (2011) – British-French biographical drama film based on the life of Margaret Thatcher, the longest-serving prime minister of the United Kingdom of the 20th century and the first woman to hold the office
- Isoroku (Japanese: 聯合艦隊司令長官 山本五十六 -太平洋戦争70年目の真実) (2011) – Japanese war drama film about Imperial Japanese Navy Admiral Isoroku Yamamoto
- J. Edgar (2011) – biographical drama film based on the career of FBI director J. Edgar Hoover
- Janie Jones (2011) – drama film based on David M. Rosenthal's real-life meeting with his own daughter
- Journey to Portugal (Portuguese: Viagem a Portugal) (2011) – Portuguese biographical film telling the true story of a couples struggles with Portuguese immigration
- Juan and Eva (Spanish: Juan y Eva) (2011) – Argentine biographical romance film based on the first meeting of Argentine president Juan Perón and Eva Perón during the 1944 San Juan earthquake
- Jungle Child (German: Dschungelkind) (2011) – German biographical drama film depicting Sabine Kuegler experiences living with a native tribe of Western Papua, Indonesia from 1979 to 1989
- The Kennedys (2011) – historical biographical miniseries chronicling the lives of the famous political Kennedy family, including key triumphs and tragedies it has experienced
- Killer Elite (2011) – action thriller film based on the 1991 novel The Feather Men by Ranulph Fiennes
- Kill the Irishman (2011) – biographical crime film based on the life of Irish American mobster Danny Greene
- The Lady (2011) – British-French biographical film depicting the life of Aung San Suu Kyi and her late husband Michael Aris
- The Last Ride (2011) – biographical drama film about the last days of country music pioneer and legend Hank Williams
- The Lost Bladesman (Cantonese: 關雲長) (2011) – Hong Kong-Chinese historical war biographical action film loosely based on the story of Guan Yu
- Machine Gun Preacher (2011) – biographical action drama film telling the story of Sam Childers, a former gang biker turned preacher, and his efforts to protect, in collaboration with the Sudan People's Liberation Army, the children of South Sudan from the atrocities of Joseph Kony's Lord's Resistance Army
- Magic Beyond Words (2011) – biographical television film detailing the journey of struggling single mother J. K. Rowling, her bid to become a published author, and her rise to fame that followed the publication of Harry Potter and the Philosopher's Stone
- Margin Call (2011) – biographical drama film loosely modeled on "Lehman Brothers" and the 2008 financial crisis
- The Maritime Silk Road (Persian: راه آبی ابريشم) (2011) – Iranian historical film about a man called Soleiman Siraf who, according to historical documents, was the first sailor to cross the Indian Ocean to China
- Moneyball (2011) – biographical sports drama film based on the Oakland Athletics baseball team's 2002 season
- Monica (Hindi: मोनिका) (2011) – Indian Hindi-language drama film based on the true story of the murder case of Shivani Bhatnagar, a journalist working for the Indian Express newspaper
- My Week with Marilyn (2011) – British-American biographical drama film depicting the making of the 1957 film The Prince and the Showgirl and focusing on the week during the shooting of the 1957 film when Monroe was escorted around London by Colin Clark after her husband Arthur Miller had returned to the United States
- Nadunissi Naaygal (Tamil: நடுநிசி நாய்கள்) (2011) – Indian Tamil-language psychological thriller film based on a true story about murderer Veera Bahu
- No One Killed Jessica (Hindi: जेसिका को किसी ने नहीं मारा) (2011) – Indian Hindi-language crime drama film based on real life murder case of Jessica Lall, a model in New Delhi who was working as a celebrity barmaid at a crowded socialite party when she was shot dead in April 1999
- Not a Love Story (Hindi: प्रेम कहानी नहीं) (2011) – Indian Hindi-language crime drama film inspired by the murder of Neeraj Grover in 2008 that led to the arrest of Emile Jerome Mathew and Maria Susairaj
- Oba: The Last Samurai (Japanese: 太平洋の奇跡 –フォックスと呼ばれた男 –) (2011) – Japanese war drama film based on the true story of Captain Sakae Ōba, who together with his survivors held out on the island of Saipan for 512 days
- Omar Killed Me (French: Omar m'a tuer) (2011) – French-Moroccan biographical crime film depicting the events of the Omar Raddad Affair
- Paper Giants: The Birth of Cleo (2011) – Australian biographical miniseries about the beginning of Cleo magazine and its creator, Ita Buttrose
- The Pastor's Wife (2011) – biographical television film based on the true-crime book of the same title about Mary Winkler and her husband
- Perfect Game (Korean: 퍼펙트 게임) (2011) – South Korean biographical sports drama film based on the true story of rivals Sun Dong-yeol of the Haitai Tigers and Choi Dong-won of the Lotte Giants, the top pitchers in the Korea Baseball Organization league during the 1980s
- Play (2011) - Swedish drama film portraying a group of black boys who rob a smaller group of white boys by means of a psychological game, inspired by actual court cases
- Puncture (2011) – biographical drama film based on the true story of Michael David "Mike" Weiss and Paul Danziger
- The PyraMMMid (Russian: ПираМММида) (2011) – Russian crime drama film inspired by financier Sergei Mavrodi, his securities company "MMM", and the pyramid scheme he ran that left upwards of fifteen million investors with nothing when it crashed
- Ragini MMS (Hindi: रागिनी एमएमएस) (2011) – Indian Hindi-language found footage horror film partly based on the real story of a girl from Delhi named Deepika
- Ramabai Bhimrao Ambedkar (Marathi: रमाबाई भीमराव आंबेडकर) (2011) – Indian Marathi-language biographical drama film based on the life of Ramabai Ambedkar also known as Ramai (mother Rama) wife of Dr. Babasaheb Ambedkar
- Rasputin (French: Raspoutine; Russian: Распутин) (2011) – French-Russian historical drama television film about the last year of the life of one of the most enigmatic figures of Russian history of the 20th century – Grigori Rasputin
- Red Dirt Rising (2011) – biographical drama film telling the true story of race car driver Jimmie Lewallen and dramatizing the birth of NASCAR in the 1930s and 1940s
- Red Dog (2011) – Australian comedy drama family film based on a true story of Red Dog a Kelpie-cattle dog cross who was well known for his travels through Western Australia's Pilbara region
- The Resistance (Mandarin: 反抗者) (2011) – Chinese martial arts action film set during World War II inspired by the beginning of the Japanese invasion of China where over 300,000 people in the capital of Nanjing were massacred
- The Rite (2011) – American-Hungarian-Italian-British supernatural horror film based on actual events as witnessed and recounted by American then-exorcist-in-training Father Gary Thomas and his experiences of being sent to Rome to be trained and work daily with veteran clergy of the practice
- The Rugged Priest (2011) – Kenyan biographical film based on the life and death of John Anthony Kaiser
- Sanctum (2011) – Australian-American action thriller film inspired by Andrew Wight's near-death experience with a 1988 cave diving expedition in Australia that resulted in 13 cavers becoming trapped in one of the world's largest underwater cave systems in Nullarbor Plain after a freak storm collapsed the entrance
- The Silence of Joan (French: Jeanne captive) (2011) – French historical film about Joan of Arc's capture and execution in 1431
- Silenced (Korean: 도가니) (2011) – South Korean crime drama film based on events that took place at Gwangju Inhwa School for the hearing-impaired, where young deaf students were the victims of repeated sexual assaults by faculty members over a period of five years in the early 2000s
- Silent House (2011) – psychological horror film about a young woman who is terrorized in her family vacation home while cleaning the property with her father and uncle, based on an actual incident that occurred in a village in Uruguay in the 1940s
- Snowtown (2011) – Australian biographical crime drama film based on the true story of the Snowtown murders
- Sonny Boy (2011) – Dutch biographical film depicting a true story about interracial love during World War II
- Soul Surfer (2011) – biographical drama film about Bethany Hamilton, a 13-year-old surfer who loses her arm in a shark attack, but is determined to get back in the water
- Spartacus: Gods of the Arena (2011) – historical biographical miniseries following the story of Gannicus, a Celtic gladiator representing Lentulus Batiatus to become Champion of Capua
- Taken from Me: The Tiffany Rubin Story (2011) – American-Canadian crime drama television film following the true story of the kidnapping and rescue of the son of Tiffany Rubin, who was kidnapped by his father and taken to South Korea
- Tatsumi (2011) – Singaporean-Japanese animated drama film based on the manga memoir A Drifting Life, chronicling Yoshihiro Tatsumi's life from 1945 to 1960, the early stages of his career as a manga artist
- Texas Killing Fields (2011) – crime drama film based on true events surrounding the murder of women picked up along I-45 and dumped in an old oil field in League City, Texas
- Thambi Vettothi Sundaram (Tamil: தம்பி வெட்டோத்தி சுந்தரம்) (2011) – Indian Tamil-language biographical crime drama film about the lives of three people in Kanyakumari district, inspired from true life and events
- There Be Dragons (2011) – American-Spanish-Argentine historical epic war drama film telling the story of a real-life priest, Josemaría Escrivá, the founder of Opus Dei, who was canonized as a Roman Catholic saint
- Too Big to Fail (2011) – biographical drama television film chronicling the 2008 financial crisis and centering on Treasury Secretary Henry Paulson
- Traffic (Malayalam: ഗതാഗതം) (2011) – Indian Malayalam-language thriller film based on actual events that happened in Chennai
- Underbelly Files: Tell Them Lucifer was Here (2011) – Australian crime drama television film telling the true story of the murders of two Victorian police officers, Gary Silk and Rodney Miller, who were gunned down in the line of duty in 1998 and the manhunt to catch their killers
- United (2011) – British biographical disaster television film based on the true story of Manchester United's "Busty Babes" and the aftermath of the 1958 Munich air disaster
- Violeta Went to Heaven (Spanish: Violeta se fue a los cielos) (2011) – Chilean biographical drama film about singer and folklorist Violeta Parra
- We Bought a Zoo (2011) – biographical family comedy drama film based on a memoir by Benjamin Mee, owner of Dartmoor Zoological Park near the village of Sparkwell in the county of Devon in England
- White Vengeance (Mandarin: 鴻門宴) (2011) – Chinese historical film loosely based on events in the Chu-Han Contention, an interregnum between the fall of the Qin dynasty and the founding of the Han dynasty in Chinese history
- William & Kate: The Movie (2011) – biographical romance television film about the relationship between Prince William and Catherine "Kate" Middleton (now The Prince and Princess of Wales)
- Winnie Mandela (2011) – South African-Canadian biographical drama film about the life of Winnie Madikizela-Mandela
- The Woman Knight of Mirror Lake (Mandarin: 竞雄女侠·秋瑾) (2011) – Chinese-Hong Kong biographical film about Chinese feminist revolutionary Qiu Jin
- Yugapurushan (Malayalam: യുഗപുരുഷൻ) (2011) – Indian Malayalam-language biographical film about the life and times of Sree Narayana Guru
