= List of 2013 films based on actual events =

This is a list of films and miniseries released in 2013 that are based on actual events. All films on this list are from American production unless indicated otherwise.

== 2013 ==
- 11.6 (2013) – French biographical drama film depicting the real-life story of criminal Toni Musulin, who pulls off one of the largest heists in France's history without the aid of firearms
- 12 Years a Slave (2013) – biographical drama film based on Solomon Northup, a New York State-born free negro who was deceived and kidnapped in Washington, D.C., and sold into slavery
- 42 (2013) – biographical sports film about baseball player Jackie Robinson, the first black athlete to play in Major League Baseball during the modern era
- 47 Ronin (2013) – historical action film telling a fictionalized account of the forty-seven rōnin, a real-life group of masterless samurai in 18th-century Japan who avenged the death of their daimyō Asano Naganori by battling his rival Kira Yoshinaka
- 3096 Days (German: 3096 Tage) (2013) – German biographical drama film based on the story of Natascha Kampusch who was kidnapped at age 10 and held in captivity for 8 years
- A Journey of Samyak Buddha (Hindi: अ जर्नी ऑफ सम्यक बुद्ध) (2013) – Indian Hindi-language film about the journey of Gautam Buddha’s miraculous birth, marriage, and his path towards enlightenment
- A Tale of Samurai Cooking (Japanese: 武士の献立) (2013) – Japanese romantic drama film depicting a true love story between a cook and the heir to a renowned cooking family
- Abuse of Weakness (French: Abus de faiblesse) (2013) – French biographical drama film based on Catherine Breillat's own experiences with notorious conman Christophe Rocancourt
- Akte Grüninger (2013) – Swiss-Austrian war drama film focusing on events in late summer 1938, when Paul Grüninger saved the lives of up to 3,600 Jewish refugees from Germany and Austria by pre-dating their visas, enabling them to migrate 'illegally' to Switzerland
- Alfredo S. Lim (The Untold Story) (2013) – Philippine biographical action film based on the life of police general Alfredo Lim
- Alone yet Not Alone (2013) – religious historical drama film dramatizing the true story of three preteen girls, Barbara and Regina Leininger and Marie LeRoy, whom the Lenape forcibly seized in the 1755 Penn's Creek massacre
- American Hustle (2013) – black comedy crime film inspired by the FBI Abscam operation of the late 1970s and early 1980s
- An Adventure in Space and Time (2013) – British biographical television film dramatizing the events surrounding the creation of Doctor Who in the 1960s, with emphasis on actor William Hartnell as he took on the role of the original incarnation of the show's main character
- Anita e Garibaldi (2013) – Brazilian historical drama film following the arrival of Giuseppe Garibaldi in Brazil, his meeting with Anita Garibaldi and the human and military learning with Luigi Rossetti in the struggle for liberation of the state of Rio Grande do Sul and Santa Catarina of the Brazilian Empire
- The Anna Nicole Story (2013) – biographical drama television film about late actress and Playboy Playmate, Anna Nicole Smith
- Ask This of Rikyu (Japanese: 利休にたずねよ) (2013) – Japanese biographical film based on Sen no Rikyū, the historical figure with the most profound influence on chanoyu, the Japanese "Way of Tea", particularly the tradition of wabi-cha
- The Attacks of 26/11 (2013) – Indian Hindi-language action thriller film based on the 2008 Mumbai attacks
- Attahasa (Kannada: ಅಟ್ಟಹಾಸ) (2013) – Indian Kannada-language biographical film based on the notorious forest brigand Veerappan
- Behind the Candelabra (2013) – biographical drama film based on the last ten years in the life of pianist Liberace and the relationship that he had with Scott Thorson
- Belle (2013) – British historical drama film inspired by the 1779 painting of Dido Elizabeth Belle beside her cousin Lady Elizabeth Murray at Kenwood House
- Betty & Coretta (2013) – drama television film based on the widows of Martin Luther King and Malcolm X and how they carry on as single mothers after the assassination of their husbands
- Bhaag Milkha Bhaag (Hindi: भाग मिल्खा भाग) (2013) – Indian Hindi-language biographical sports drama film based on life of Indian athlete Milkha Singh
- Big Sur (2013) – adventure drama film based on the time Jack Kerouac spent in Big Sur, California, and his three brief sojourns to his friend Lawrence Ferlinghetti's cabin in Bixby Canyon
- The Bling Ring (2013) – satirical crime film based on the Bling Ring, also known as the Hollywood Hills Burglar Bunch, who broke into Hollywood Hills homes from October 2008 through August 2009
- Blue Caprice (2013) – crime drama film based on the 2002 D.C. sniper attacks
- Bolívar, Man of Difficulties (Spanish: Bolívar, el hombre de las dificultades) (2013) – Venezuelan historical drama film based on the obstacles that Simón Bolívar had to face in 1815 and 1816
- Bonnie & Clyde (2013) – revisionist crime drama miniseries about Great Depression-era outlaws Bonnie Parker and Clyde Barrow
- Boy Golden: Shoot to Kill (2013) – Philippine biographical action film loosely based on the life of Arturo Porcuna who rises through the Manila underworld in the 1960s until his murder
- Bozo (Japanese: ぼっちゃん) (2013) – Japanese drama film based on the Akihabara massacre
- Burning Blue (2013) – drama film based on D.M.W. Greer's experiences as a U.S. Navy aviator during the "Don't Ask, Don't Tell" era
- Burning Bush (Czech: Hořící keř) (2013) – Czech historical drama miniseries focusing on the personal sacrifice of a Prague history student, Jan Palach, who set himself on fire in 1969 in protest against the Soviet occupation of Czechoslovakia in the previous year
- Burton & Taylor (2013) – British romantic drama television film based on the legendary acting duo and former husband and wife, Richard Burton and Elizabeth Taylor, during their preparation for a 1983 theatrical production of the play, Private Lives
- The Butler (2013) – historical drama film based on the real life of Eugene Allen, who worked in the White House for decades
- Camille Claudel 1915 (2013) – French biographical film based on sculptor Camille Claudel
- Captain Phillips (2013) – biographical action thriller film based on the story of the eponymous Captain Richard Phillips, a merchant mariner who was taken hostage by Somali pirates
- CBGB (2013) – biographical drama film about the former New York music venue CBGB
- Celluloid (Malayalam: സെല്ലുലോയ്ഡ്) (2013) – Indian Malayalam-language biographical film based on the life story of J. C. Daniel, the father of Malayalam cinema
- The Clerics (Indonesian: Sang Kiai) (2013) – Indonesian drama film following the Muslim cleric and founder of Indonesian Islamic organization Nahdlatul Ulama, Hasyim Asy'ari through the Japanese occupation of the Dutch East Indies and the Indonesian National Revolution
- The Closed Circuit (Polish: Układ zamknięty) (2013) – Polish action film inspired by the true story of businessmen struggling with the accusations made by the prosecutor's office and the tax office. Some of them ended up in mining arrest, and their company was brought to collapse
- The Conjuring (2013) – supernatural horror film based on purportedly real-life reports that inspired The Amityville Horror story
- CrazySexyCool: The TLC Story (2013) – biographical television film about the R&B and hip hop musical trio TLC
- Dallas Buyers Club (2013) – biographical drama film telling the story of Ron Woodroof, an AIDS patient diagnosed in the mid-1980s when HIV/AIDS treatments were under-researched, while the disease was not understood and highly stigmatized
- The Dance of Reality (Spanish: La danza de la realidad) (2013) – Chilean-French semi-autobiographical drama film by director Alejandro Jodorowsky
- Decoding Annie Parker (2013) – biographical drama film telling the story of Annie Parker and the discovery of the BRCA1 breast cancer gene
- Devil's Knot (2013) – biographical crime drama film telling the true story of three murdered children, and the three teenagers known as the West Memphis Three who were convicted of killing them, during the Satanic ritual abuse panic
- The Devil's Violinist (2013) – Italian-German biographical drama film based on the life story of the 19th-century Italian violinist and composer Niccolò Paganini
- Diana (2013) – British biographical drama film based on the last two years in the life of Diana, Princess of Wales
- Drift (2013) – Australian surf drama film based on the birth of the surfing industry in the 1970s
- Empire State (2013) – crime drama film based on based on a true story of two childhood friends who rob an armored car repository and the NYPD officer who stands in their way
- Ephraim's Rescue (2013) – religious historical drama film based on the true stories of Mormon pioneers Ephraim Hanks and Thomas Dobson and their experiences in the handcart brigades
- The Fifth Estate (2013) – biographical thriller film about the news-leaking website WikiLeaks
- Free Ride (2013) – crime drama film based on the childhood experiences of director Shana Betz growing up in Fort Lauderdale, Florida
- Free the Nipple (2013) – comedy drama film based on true events of a mass movement of topless women, backed by First Amendment lawyers, graffiti installations, and national publicity stunts, who invade New York City to protest censorship hypocrisies and promote gender equality legally and culturally in the U.S
- The Frozen Ground (2013) – crime thriller film based on the crimes of the real-life Alaskan serial killer Robert Hansen
- Fruitvale Station (2013) – biographical drama film based on the events leading to the death of Oscar Grant, a young man killed in 2009 by BART police officer Johannes Mehserle
- Gagarin: First in Space (Russian: Гагарин. Первый в космосе) (2013) – Russian biographical drama film about the first man in space, Yuri Gagarin, and the mission of Vostok 1
- Gangster Squad (2013) - action thriller film about a group of real-life LAPD officers and detectives called the Gangster Squad who were assigned to bring down crime kingpin Mickey Cohen
- The German Doctor (Spanish: Wakolda) (2013) - Spanish historical drama thriller film about Nazi SS officer and physician Josef Mengele, infamous for performing human experiments in the Auschwitz concentration camp
- Gimme Shelter (2013) – religious drama film based on a true story about a runaway teenage girl who becomes pregnant and is placed in a home for pregnant girls
- The Girl with Nine Wigs (German: Heute bin ich blond) (2013) – German biographical comedy drama film based on the autobiography by Sophie van der Stap
- The Grandmaster (2013) – martial arts drama film based on the life story of the Wing Chun
- The Great Train Robbery (2013) – British crime drama miniseries telling the story of the Great Train Robbery on 8 August 1963, first from the perspective of the robbers, and then from the perspective of the police
- Han Gong-ju (Korean: 한공주) (2013) – South Korean crime drama film inspired by the infamous Miryang gang rape case of 2004
- The Haunting in Connecticut 2: Ghosts of Georgia (2013) – psychological horror film inspired by the real-life events surrounding the Wyrick house in Ellerslie, Georgia, as recounted in the book The Veil: Heidi Wyrick's Story
- The Hijack That Went South (Finnish: Kaappari) (2013) – Finnish drama film based on real events of the 1978 Oulu Hijacking
- Hope (Korean: 소원) (2013) – South Korean crime drama film based on the true story of the infamous Cho Doo-Soon case in 2008, in which an 8-year-old girl, named "Na-young" in the South Korean press, was raped and beaten by a drunk 57-year-old man in a public bathroom
- House of Versace (2013) – Canadian biographical drama television film depicting the real-life events of the Versace family
- The Informant (French: Gibraltar) (2013) – French crime thriller film loosely based on a true story of a bar owner in Gibraltar
- The Invisible Woman (2013) – British biographical drama film about the secret love affair between Charles Dickens and Nelly Ternan, which lasted for thirteen years until his death in 1870
- Ip Man: The Final Fight (Chinese: 葉問：終極一戰) (2013) – Hong Kong martial arts biographical film based on the life of the Wing Chun grandmaster Ip Man
- iSteve (2013) – biographical parody film about the life of Steve Jobs
- Jack (2013) – Canadian biographical drama television film about the late Jack Layton
- Jappeloup (2013) – French-Canadian biographical drama film about Pierre Durand, Jr. who resigns from his career as a lawyer and becomes a professional equestrian, focusing on show jumping
- Jimi: All Is by My Side (2013) – biographical drama film telling the story of Jimi Hendrix's career beginnings, through his arrival in London, the creation of The Jimi Hendrix Experience and the beginning of his fame prior to his performance at the Monterey Pop Festival
- Jobs (2013) – biographical drama film based on the life of Steve Jobs, from 1974 while a student at Reed College to the introduction of the iPod in 2001
- Jodi Arias: Dirty Little Secret (2013) – drama television film about the Murder of Travis Alexander
- Kill Your Darlings (2013) – biographical drama film about the college days of some of the earliest members of the Beat Generation and the killing in Riverside Park
- Killing Kennedy (2013) – biographical drama television film dramatizing the presidency and assassination of John F. Kennedy, as well as the life of Lee Harvey Oswald in the years leading up to the assassination
- Killing Lincoln (2013) – political drama television film containing events surrounding the presidency and assassination of Abraham Lincoln
- King of the Sands (2013) – Syrian historical biographical film about the life of King Abdulaziz, an emir of the central Arabian Al Saud clan and founder of the present-day kingdom of Saudi Arabia
- The Last of Robin Hood (2013) – biographical drama film about actor Errol Flynn
- Legend No. 17 (Russian: Легенда №17) (2013) – Russian biographical sports film based on real events and tells of the rise to fame of the Soviet hockey player Valeri Kharlamov and about the first match of the Summit Series USSR — Canada 1972
- Letters to Sofija (Lithuanian: Laiškai Sofijai) (2013) – Lithuanian biographical film about the life of Mikalojus Konstantinas Čiurlionis
- The Liberator (Spanish: Libertador) (2013) – Spanish-Venezuelan historical drama film about the life and times of Simón Bolívar
- The Light: Swami Vivekananda (2013) – Indian biographical film based on the life and teaching of Swami Vivekananda
- Like the Wind (Italian: Come il vento) (2013) – Italian biographical film telling the story of Armida Miserere, the first woman to direct a high security jail in Italy
- Lone Survivor (2013) – biographical war film dramatizing the unsuccessful United States Navy SEALs counter-insurgent mission Operation Red Wings, during which a four-man SEAL reconnaissance and surveillance team was given the task of tracking down the Taliban leader Ahmad Shah
- The Look of Love (2013) – British biographical film about the life of Paul Raymond
- Louder Than Words (2013) – biographical drama film based on events that led to the founding of Maria Fareri Children’s Hospital in Valhalla, New York
- Louis Cyr (2013) – Canadian biographical drama film about Louis Cyr, the 19th-century strong man still considered to be one of the strongest men to have ever lived
- Lovelace (2013) – biographical drama film centering on porn actress Linda Lovelace, star of Deep Throat, a landmark 1972 film at the forefront of the Golden Age of Porn
- Lucan (2013) – British crime drama miniseries portraying the disappearance in 1974 of the Earl of Lucan, following the murder of his children's nanny
- Madras Cafe (Hindi: मद्रास कैफे) (2013) – Indian Hindi-language political action thriller film set during the time of Indian intervention in the Sri Lankan civil war
- Madrasa (Dari: مدرسه) (2013) – Afghan drama film based on a true story about an Afghan refugee family living in Iran after war in Afghanistan
- Mandela: Long Walk to Freedom (2013) – British-South African biographical film based on the 1994 autobiography by Nelson Mandela
- Mario Conde, The Glory Days (Spanish: Mario Conde. Los días de gloria) (2013) – Spanish biographical miniseries portraying the 1993 intervention of Banesto
- Marina (2013) – biographical film based upon the life of the Italian singer Rocco Granata who moved to Belgium when he was a young boy
- Mary Queen of Scots (2013) – Swiss historical drama film portraying the inner life of Mary, the Queen of Scotland
- Meghe Dhaka Tara (Bengali: মেঘে ঢাকা তারা) (2013) – Indian Bengali-language film inspired from the life and works of Bengali film director Ritwik Ghatak
- Mr. Hockey: The Gordie Howe Story (2013) – Canadian-American sports drama television film centring on hockey legend Gordie Howe's 1973 return to playing hockey with the new Houston Aeros of the World Hockey Association
- Muhammad Ali's Greatest Fight (2013) – war sports drama television film about boxer Muhammad Ali's refusal to report for induction into the United States military during the Vietnam War, focusing on how the United States Supreme Court decided to rule in Ali's favor in the 1971 case of Clay v. United States
- My Paparotti (Korean: 파파로티) (2013) – South Korean biographical comedy-drama based on the real-life story of Kim Ho-joong, who first appeared on the variety show Star King in July 2009, where he talked about growing up as a thug and joining gangs, until his grandmother encouraged him to pursue singing and in 2020 became one of the seven finalists of the trot audition program Mr. Trot
- Njinga: Queen of Angola (Portuguese: Njinga: Rainha de Angola) (2013) – Angolan historical epic film presenting the true story of Queen Njinga Mbandi
- One Chance (2013) – British-American biographical comedy drama film about opera singer and Britain's Got Talent winner Paul Potts
- Orissa (Malayalam: ഒറീസ) (2013) – Indian Malayalam-language romance film based on a Malayali constable, Christhudas, falling in love with an Oriya girl, Suneyi
- Pain & Gain (2013) – action comedy film based on the activities of Sun Gym gang, a group of ex-convicts and bodybuilders convicted of kidnapping, extortion, torture, and murder in Miami in the mid-1990s
- The Pardon (2013) - drama film Toni Jo Henry, a woman who overcomes a tragic beginning but was executed for murder
- Parkland (2013) – historical drama film that recounts the chaotic events that occurred following the 1963 assassination of John F. Kennedy
- Pedro Calungsod: Young Martyr (Tagalog: Pedro Calungsod: Batang Martir) (2013) – Philippine biographical film depicting the life and martyrdom of Pedro Calungsod
- Phantom (2013) – submarine thriller film loosely based on the real-life events involving the sinking of the submarine K-129 in 1968
- Phil Spector (2013) – biographical drama television film based on the murder trials of record producer, songwriter and musician Phil Spector
- Philomena (2013) – British drama film based on the true story of Philomena Lee's 50-year search for her adopted son and Sixsmith's efforts to help her find him
- Prosecuting Casey Anthony (2013) – crime drama television film depicting the trial of Casey Anthony for the murder of her daughter, Caylee
- The Quispe Girls (Spanish: Las niñas Quispe) (2013) – Chilean biographical film based on the true story of the Quispe sisters and on Juan Radrigán's play "Las Brutas"
- The Railway Man (2013) – British war film about Eric Lomax about his experiences as a prisoner of war during World War II and being forced to help build the Thai–Burma Railway for the Japanese military
- Reaching for the Moon (Portuguese: Flores Raras) (2013) – Brazilian biographical drama film dramatizing the love story of the American poet Elizabeth Bishop and the Brazilian architect Lota de Macedo Soares
- Ring of Fire (2013) – biographical drama television film about the life of June Carter Cash and Johnny Cash, and is based on their son John Carter Cash's 2007 book Anchored in Love: An Intimate Portrait of June Carter Cash
- Rush (2013) – British-German biographical sports film centring on the Hunt–Lauda rivalry between two Formula One drivers, the British James Hunt and the Austrian Niki Lauda
- The Saratov Approach (2013) – thriller drama film depicting the 1998 kidnapping of two missionaries of the Church of Jesus Christ of Latter-day Saints (LDS Church) in Saratov, Russia
- Savannah (2013) – historical family drama film about Christmas Moultrie and his friendship with Ward Allen in Savannah back in the early 20th century
- Saving Lincoln (2013) – biographical historical drama film about Ward Hill Lamon, a friend of President Abraham Lincoln, and follows their overlapping legal careers in Illinois prior to the American Civil War
- Saving Mr. Banks (2013) – biographical drama film centering on the development of the 1964 film Mary Poppins
- Shootout at Wadala (Hindi: वडाला में गोलीबारी) (2013) – Indian Hindi-language biographical gangster crime film dramatizing a 1982 encounter by Bombay police in which gangster Manya Surve was shot dead
- Silk Sakkath Hot (Kannada: ಸಿಲ್ಕ್ ಸಕ್ಕತ್) (2013) – Indian Kannada-language biographical film inspired by the life of Silk Smitha, a South Indian actress noted for her erotic roles
- Snake & Mongoose (2013) – sports drama film telling the story of the rivalry between drag racing drivers Don "The Snake" Prudhomme and Tom "The Mongoose" McEwen and their groundbreaking accomplishments in the world of drag racing
- Snitch (2013) – action thriller film based on the real experiences of Drug Enforcement Agency informant James Settembrino
- Soekarno (2013) – Indonesian biographical drama film telling the story of the life of the late Sukarno, the first president of Indonesia
- Sorrow and Joy (Danish: Sorg og glæde) (2013) – Danish drama film recounting the tragic event in which Nils Malmros' wife, suffering from bipolar disorder, killed their infant daughter with a knife
- Special 26 (Hindi: विशेष 26) (2013) – Indian Hindi-language heist film based on the 1987 Opera House heist where a group posing as CBI officers executed an income tax raid on the jeweler in Bombay
- Summer in February (2013) – British romantic drama film focusing on the true story of the love triangle between British artist Alfred Munnings, his friend Gilbert Evans and Florence Carter-Wood in early 20th-century Cornwall
- Tanda Putera (2013) – Malaysian historical political drama film chronicling the relationship between Abdul Razak Hussein, who was the second Malaysian prime minister, and his then deputy Ismail Abdul Rahman set around the time after the 1969 racial riots
- Tlatelolco, Summer of 68 (Spanish: Tlatelolco, verano del 68) (2013) – Mexican-Argentine political thriller film about the political events that took place in Mexico City in the months before the 1968 Olympics
- Tracks (2013) – Australian drama film chronicling Robyn Davidson's nine-month journey on camels across the Australian desert
- Trilussa (2013) – Italian biographical miniseries based on the life of the Italian poet Trilussa
- Tula: The Revolt (2013) – Dutch-Curaçaoan historical drama film telling the life story of the slave Tula who lead the Slave Revolt of 1795 on Curaçao in the Dutch West Indies
- U Want Me 2 Kill Him? (2013) – British thriller drama film based on a true story and follows two teenage schoolboys who are drawn into a complicated world of online chatrooms, eventually leading to bizarre consequences
- Victor Young Perez (2013) – French biographical sports drama film depicting the life of the boxer and Auschwitz concentration camp prisoner Victor Perez
- Violette (2013) – French-Belgian biographical drama film about the French novelist Violette Leduc
- Walesa: Man of Hope (2013) – Polish biographical film depicting the life of Nobel Peace Prize winner and founder of Poland's Solidarity movement, Lech Wałęsa, as events in the 1970s lead to a peaceful revolution
- Waltz for Monica (Swedish: Monica Z) (2013) – Swedish biographical drama film based on the true life and career of singer and actress Monica Zetterlund
- We Are So Young (Portuguese: Somos tão Jovens) (2013) – Brazilian biographical drama film about Brazilian rock singer Renato Russo
- The White Queen (2013) – British historical drama miniseries set against the backdrop of the Wars of the Roses and presenting the story of the women involved in the long conflict for the throne of England
- The Wind Rises (Japanese: 風立ちぬ) (2013) – Japanese animated historical drama film about Jiro Horikoshi, designer of the Mitsubishi A5M fighter aircraft and its successor, the Mitsubishi A6M Zero, used by the Empire of Japan during World War II
- Wolf Creek 2 (2013) – Australian horror film based upon the real-life murders of backpackers by Ivan Milat in the 1990s and Bradley Murdoch in 2001
- The Wolf of Wall Street (2013) – biographical crime black comedy film recounting Jordan Belfort's career as a stockbroker in New York City and how his firm, Stratton Oakmont, engaged in rampant corruption and fraud on Wall Street, leading to his downfall
