= List of 2012 films based on actual events =

This is a list of films and miniseries released in 2012 that are based on actual events. All films on this list are from American production unless indicated otherwise.

== 2012 ==
- 11/25 The Day Mishima Chose His Own Fate (Japanese: 11・25自決の日 三島由紀夫と若者たち) (2012) – Japanese historical drama film based on the Mishima Incident, which was a failed coup d'etat attempt led by Yukio Mishima in 1970
- A Green Story (Greek: Μια πράσινη ιστορία) (2012) – American-Greek biographical drama film about a Greek immigrant who becomes a successful inventor of eco-friendly household cleaning products, inspired by true events
- A Royal Affair (Danish: En kongelig affære) (2012) – Danish historical romance film set in the court of the mentally ill King Christian VII of Denmark, and focusing on the romance between his wife, Caroline Matilda of Great Britain, and the royal physician Johann Friedrich Struensee
- A Smile as Big as the Moon (2012) – family television film based on the 2002 memoir of the same title by teacher Mike Kersjes, outlining his venture to bring out the best from his special education students by taking them to Space Camp
- Abducted: The Carlina White Story (2012) – biographical mystery drama television film about Carlina White, who was abducted as an infant by Ann Pettway from a New York hospital and solved her own kidnapping and reunited with her biological parents 23 years later
- Act of Valor (2012) – action war thriller film based on real US Navy SEALs missions around the world
- Aftershock (2012) – disaster horror film based on true events from the 2010 8.8 earthquake in Chile
- Amen (2012) – Indian drama short film inspired from the life of the human right activist Harish Iyer
- An Officer and a Murderer (2012) – crime drama television film about the crimes committed by Russell Williams, a former colonel in the Royal Canadian Air Force
- Anita Garibaldi (2012) – Italian biographical miniseries based on real life events of Anita Garibaldi, wife and comrade-in-arms of Italian revolutionary Giuseppe Garibaldi
- Any Day Now (2012) – drama film about a gay couple who assume guardianship of a teenage boy who has Down syndrome, only to find themselves at odds with the biological mother and California's family law courts, inspired by that of Rudy, a gay man in Brooklyn
- Aravaan (Tamil: அரவான்) (2012) – Indian Tamil-language epic historical film based on the history of Madurai from 1310 to 1910
- Argo (2012) – historical thriller film based on the "Canadian Caper", in which Tony Mendez led the rescue of six U.S. diplomats from Tehran, Iran, under the guise of filming a science-fiction film during the 1979–1981 Iran hostage crisis
- As One (Korean: 코리아) (2012) – South Korean sports drama film based on the true story of the first ever post-war Unified Korea sports team which won the women's team gold medal at the 1991 World Table Tennis Championships in Chiba, Japan
- The Assassins (Mandarin: 銅雀臺) (2012) – Chinese historical drama film about Cao Cao, a prominent warlord who became the de facto head of the central government in China towards the end of the Han dynasty
- Augustine (2012) – French historical erotic drama film following a love affair between French neurologist Jean-Martin Charcot and his patient Louise Augustine Gleizes, who was known as Augustine or A
- Barabbas (Italian: Barabba) (2012) – American-Italian Christian biographical television film about the life of Barabbas
- Beaconsfield (2012) – Australian biographical drama television film about the 2006 Beaconsfield Mine collapse
- Bert and Dickie (2012) – British biographical sports drama television film depicting Dickie Burnell and Bert Bushnell's achievement at the 1948 Summer Olympics
- The Best of Men (2012) – British historical biographical television film dramatising the pioneering work of Dr Ludwig Guttmann with paraplegic patients at Stoke Mandeville Hospital, which led to the foundation of the Paralympic Games
- Bheema Theeradalli (Kannada: ಭೀಮ ತೀರದಳ್ಳಿ) (2012) – Indian Kannada-language biographical action film based on a real-life incident that occurred in 1985 in North Karnataka during the time of the dreaded dacoit, Chandappa Harijana
- Big Miracle (2012) – American-British biographical drama film based on Tom Rose's 1989 book Freeing the Whales, which covers Operation Breakthrough, the 1988 international effort to rescue gray whales trapped in ice near Point Barrow, Alaska
- Bikie Wars: Brothers in Arms (2012) – Australian drama miniseries depicting the story of the Milperra massacre, when the Bandidos and the Comanchero motorcycle clubs went to war on Father's Day, Sunday 2 September 1984
- Bill W. (2012) – biographical drama film about William Griffith Wilson, the co-founder of Alcoholics Anonymous
- Blue Eyed Butcher (2012) – crime drama thriller television film based on the 2003 stabbing death of Jeff Wright by the hands of his wife, Susan Wright, focusing on Kelly Siegler, the case's prosecutor
- Buddha in a Traffic Jam (2012) – Indian political thriller film narrating a tale of inter-meddling of academia with corruption and maoism, loosely based on the life of Indian author and political activist Arundhati Roy
- Call Girl (2012) – Swedish political thriller film depicting a fictionalised version of events based on the so-called 'Bordellhärvan' political scandal of 1970s Sweden which linked several prominent politicians to a prostitution ring that included underage girls
- Captive (2012) – Philippine-French-British action psychological thriller film describing the torturous life of the hostages of the Dos Palmas kidnappings, whose survivors were freed after a year in captivity
- Chasing Mavericks (2012) – biographical drama film about the life of American surfer Jay Moriarity
- Clinton (2012) – biographical television film about former president Bill Clinton
- The Color of Time (2012) – biographical drama film about the life of C. K. Williams
- Compliance (2012) – thriller film based upon a strip search phone call scam that took place in Mount Washington, Kentucky, in which the caller, posing as a police officer, convinced a restaurant manager to carry out unlawful and intrusive procedures on an employee
- The Consul of Bordeaux (Portuguese: O Cônsul de Bordéus) (2012) – Portuguese biographical historical drama film depicting the life of Aristides de Sousa Mendes
- Dandupalya (Kannada: ದಂಡುಪಾಳ್ಯ) (2012) – Indian Kannada-language crime film based on the real-life exploits of a notorious gang named 'Dandupalya'
- The Day of the Siege: September Eleven 1683 (2012) – Italian-Polish historical drama film based on the 1683 Battle of Vienna
- Devil's Dust (2012) – Australian biographical drama miniseries recounting the tragedy of many Australian workers and their families afflicted with asbestosis and mesothelioma in the twentieth-century asbestos mining and processing industries, through the factual case of Bernie Banton
- Diaz – Don't Clean Up This Blood (2012) – Italian biographical drama film focusing on the final days of the 2001 G8 summit in Genoa, Italy, when police stormed Armando Diaz, a school in Genoa
- Doctor Ray and the Devils (Serbian: Doktor Rej i đavoli) (2012) – Serbian biographical comedy drama film centering around famous American director Nicholas Ray's 1960s stay in SFR Yugoslavia on invitation by Ratko Dražević, the head of Avala Film studio and former Yugoslav state security operative
- Dormant Beauty (Italian: Bella addormentata) (2012) – Italian biographical drama film revolving around the true story of Eluana Englaro, a girl felt into an irreversible coma in 1992 following a car accident and deemed incurable
- The Dream of the Marathon Runner (Italian: Il sogno del maratoneta) (2012) – Italian biographical sports drama television film about the story of the Italian athlete Dorando Pietri and restitutes the runner's fortunes and misfortunes at the 1908 Summer Olympics in London
- Dream Team 1935 (Latvian: Sapņu komanda 1935) (2012) – Latvian biographical sports drama film about the Latvia national basketball team which won EuroBasket 1935, the first FIBA European basketball championship
- Eden (2012) – thriller drama film inspired by the story of Chong Kim, who claims that she was kidnapped and sold into a domestic human trafficking ring in the mid-1990s
- El Presidente (Spanish: El Presidente: Historia del General Emilio Aguinaldo y la Primera República de Filipinas; Tagalog: Ang Pangulo: Kuwento ni Heneral Emilio Aguinaldo at ang Unang Republika ng Pilipinas) (2012) – Philippine biographical historical drama film about the life of General Emilio Aguinaldo, the first president of the Philippine Republic
- Emperor (Japanese: 終戦のエンペラー) (2012) – American-Japanese historical drama film based on the investigation of the role of Emperor Hirohito in World War II
- Falling Flowers (Chinese: 蕭紅) (2012) – Chinese biographical drama film based on the life of writer Xiao Hong
- Fatal Honeymoon (2012) – American-Australian mystery drama television film loosely based on the suspicious death of Tina Watson whilst she was on her honeymoon
- Fetih 1453 (2012) – Turkish epic action film based on events surrounding the Fall of Constantinople to the Ottoman Turks during the reign of Sultan Mehmed II
- Flight (2012) – action drama film inspired by the true incident of Alaska Airlines Flight 261, in which a Boeing MD-83 suffered vertical control malfunctions and plummeted 31,000 feet on 31 January 2000
- Florbela (2012) – Portuguese biographical film about the life of poet Florbela Espanca
- For Greater Glory (2012) – Mexican epic historical war drama film based on the Mexican Catholic counter-revolution of the 1920s
- Game Change (2012) – political drama television film based on John McCain's 2008 presidential election campaign
- Gangs of Wasseypur (2012) – Indian Hindi-language crime action film centering on the coal mafia of Dhanbad, and the underlying power struggles, politics and vengeance between three crime families from 1941 to the mid-1990s
- The Girl (2012) – British biographical drama television film based on Donald Spoto's 2009 book Spellbound by Beauty: Alfred Hitchcock and His Leading Ladies, which discusses the English film director Hitchcock and the women who played leading roles in his films
- God Loves Caviar (Greek: Ο Θεός αγαπάει το χαβιάρι) (2012) – Greek-Russian biographical drama film based upon the true story of Ioannis Varvakis, a Greek caviar merchant and eventual benefactor from Psara who was formerly a pirate
- Goltzius and the Pelican Company (2012) – Dutch-French-British historical drama film based on the life of Hendrik Goltzius, a late 16th-century Dutch printer and engraver of erotic prints
- The Great Mint Swindle (2012) – Australian biographical crime film based on the Perth Mint Swindle which took place in the 1980s
- Habibie & Ainun (2012) – Indonesian biographical drama film based on the memoir written by the 3rd president of the Republic of Indonesia, B. J. Habibie about his wife, Hasri Ainun Habibie, also named "Habibie and Ainun"
- Hannah Arendt (2012) – German-French-Luxembourger biographical drama film centering on the life of German-Jewish philosopher and political theorist Hannah Arendt
- Hatfields & McCoys (2012) – Western drama miniseries based on the Hatfield–McCoy feud
- Haute Cuisine (French: Les Saveurs du Palais) (2012) – French comedy drama film based on the true story of Danièle Mazet-Delpeuch and how she was appointed as the private chef for François Mitterrand
- Hayabusa: The Long Voyage Home (Japanese: はやぶさ 遥かなる帰還) (2012) – Japanese drama film based on the story of the Hayabusa asteroid probe, which collected samples from the asteroid Itokawa in 2005 and returned them to Earth in 2010
- Hell and Mr. Fudge (2012) – biographical drama film about Edward Fudge, a real life Alabama preacher who was hired to determine the nature of hell
- Hemingway & Gellhorn (2012) – biographical drama television film about the lives of journalist Martha Gellhorn and her husband, writer Ernest Hemingway
- Hibakusha (2012) – animated biographical short film inspired by the true story of Hiroshima atomic bomb survivor and Nguyen's close friend, Kaz Suyeishi
- Hitchcock (2012) – biographical romantic drama film based on the book Alfred Hitchcock and the Making of Psycho about the relationship between director Alfred Hitchcock and his wife Alma Reville during the filming of Psycho
- The Horde (Russian: Орда) (2012) – Russian historical film portraying a highly fictionalised narrative of how Saint Alexius healed Taydula Khatun, the mother of the Golden Horde khan Jani Beg, from blindness
- The Horses of McBride (2012) – Canadian drama television film based on the true story of a family in McBride, British Columbia, who rescued two horses that had been trapped by an avalanche in 2008
- House on the Hill (2012) – horror film based on the real-life killing spree of serial killers Leonard Lake and Charles Ng
- Howzat! Kerry Packer's War (2012) – Australian sports drama miniseries telling the story of World Series Cricket and its creator, Australian media mogul Kerry Packer, who signed up the world's greatest players and set up a parallel cricket competition
- Hyde Park on Hudson (2012) – British historical comedy drama film based on the diaries of Margaret Suckley, a close friend of U.S. president Franklin D. Roosevelt
- The Iceman (2012) – biographical crime film about notorious hitman Richard Kuklinski
- The Impossible (Spanish: Lo imposible) (2012) – Spanish English-language disaster drama film based on the experience of María Belón and her family in the 2004 Indian Ocean tsunami
- Into the White (2012) – Norwegian-Swedish historical war film loosely based on real-life events that occurred in Norway during the Second World War
- Iron Gate, The Exile of Perón (Spanish: Puerta de Hierro, el exilio de Perón) (2012) – Argentine biographical film based on the exile of Argentine president Juan Perón, who was deposed in 1955 by a military coup named Revolución Libertadora, left the country, and finally returned in 1973
- Ivan Megharoopan (Malayalam: ഇവാൻ മേഘരൂപൻ) (2012) – Indian Malayalam-language biographical film based on the life of Malayalam poet P. Kunhiraman Nair
- Joshua Tree, 1951: A Portrait of James Dean (2012) – biographical drama film depicting a portrait of the pre-fame James Dean and his bisexual proclivities
- Kazhugu (Tamil: கழுகு) (2012) – Indian Tamil-language comedy thriller film revolving around four people, referred to as "Kazhugu," who recover bodies of suicide victims who jump off a cliff
- Kon-Tiki (2012) – Norwegian-British historical drama film about the 1947 Kon-Tiki expedition
- Krantiveera Sangolli Rayanna (Kannada: ಕ್ರಾಂತಿವೀರ ಸಂಗೊಳ್ಳಿ ರಾಯಣ್ಣ) (2012) – Indian Kannada-language war drama film about Sangolli Rayanna, a prominent freedom fighter from Karnataka, who fought the East India Company till he was captured and executed in 1830
- Last Flight to Abuja (2012) – Nigerian disaster thriller film based on a 2006 Nigerian aviation tragedy
- The Last Sentence (Swedish: Dom över död man) (2012) – Swedish historical biographical film focusing on the life and career of Torgny Segerstedt, a Swedish newspaper editor who was a prominent critic of Hitler and the Nazis during a period when the Swedish government and monarch were intent on maintaining Sweden's neutrality and avoiding tensions with Germany
- Letter to Eva (Spanish: Carta a Eva) (2012) – Spanish biographical miniseries about how the lives of three different women—Eva Perón (first lady of Argentina), Carmen Polo (Francisco Franco's wife) and Juana Doña (a communist militant)—intertwine during the official visit paid by the first one to Spain in 1947, when the country was internationally isolated and the population starving
- Lincoln (2012) – biographical historical drama film based on the final four months of President Lincoln's life and his efforts in January 1865 to have the Thirteenth Amendment to the United States Constitution passed by the U.S. House of Representatives
- Liz & Dick (2012) – biographical drama television film chronicling the relationship of Elizabeth Taylor and Richard Burton
- Mabo (2012) – Australian biographical drama television film about the successful legal battle waged by Torres Strait Islander man Eddie Koiki Mabo to bring about native land title legislation in Australia
- Mary of Nazareth (Italian: Maria di Nazaret) (2012) – Italian Christian drama television film focusing on life events of Mary of Nazareth, Mother of Jesus, and Mary Magdalene
- Measuring the World (German: Die Vermessung der Welt) (2012) – German-Austrian historical biographical drama film following two brilliant and eccentric scientists, Alexander von Humboldt and Carl Friedrich Gauß, on their life paths in early-19th-century Germany
- My Way (French: Cloclo) (2012) – French biographical drama film about the life of French singer, songwriter and entertainer Claude François
- Naduvula Konjam Pakkatha Kaanom (Tamil: நடுவுல கொஞ்சம் பக்கத்த காணோம்) (2012) – Indian Tamil-language black comedy film based on a true story that involves a young man who experiences retrograde amnesia after a cricket incident two days before his wedding
- National Security (Korean: 남영동) (2012) – South Korean prison drama film based on the memoir by Kim Geun-tae, a democracy activist who was kidnapped and tortured by national police inspector Lee Geun-an for 22 days in 1985 during the Chun Doo-hwan regime
- No (2012) – Chilean historical drama film based on the unpublished play El Plebiscito, focusing on how advertising tactics came to be widely used in political campaigns for the 1988 plebiscite
- Omar (Arabic: عُمَرْ) (2012) – Arab drama miniseries based on the life of Omar ibn al-Khattab, the second Caliph of Islam, and depicts his life from 18 years old until the moments of his death
- Operation Autumn (Portuguese: Operação Outono) (2012) – Portuguese political thriller film about the operation that lead to the brutal assassination of General Humberto Delgado, killed by the Portuguese police in 1965, during the Estado Novo regime
- Operation E (Spanish: Operación E) (2012) – Spanish-Colombian biographical drama film inspired by the story of José Crisanto, a Colombian peasant who was sentenced to 33 years in prison after nursing the son of Clara Rojas who was kidnapped by the FARC
- Paan Singh Tomar (Hindi: पान सिंह तोमर) (2012) – Indian Hindi-language biographical film about the eponymous athlete who was a soldier in the Indian Army and won a gold medal at the Indian National Games, but was forced to become a rebel against the system
- The Passion of Marie (Danish: Marie Krøyer; Swedish: Balladen om Marie Krøyer) (2012) – Danish-Swedish biographical drama film telling the story of the stormy relationship between Marie Krøyer and Peder Severin Krøyer, two of the Skagen Painters, in the late 19th century
- People Like Us (2012) – drama film based on the true story of a sister and brother who never knew that they were siblings
- The Phantoms (2012) – Canadian sports drama television film based on the true story of the 2008 Boys in Red bus crash in Bathurst, New Brunswick
- Renoir (2012) – French historical drama film based on the last years of Pierre-Auguste Renoir at Cagnes-sur-Mer during World War I
- The Revolution is an Eternal Dream (Spanish: La revolución es un sueño eterno) (2012) – Argentine historical drama film based on the life of Juan José Castelli, who led the May Revolution and the early steps of the Argentine War of Independence
- Rhino Season (Persian: فصل کرگدن) (2012) – Iraqi-Kurdish-Turkish biographical drama film based on Iranian Kurdish poet and author Sedigh Kamangar, who spent 27 years imprisoned in Iran while his family was told that he was dead
- Rommel (2012) – German historical biographical television film dramatising the last days of German general Erwin Rommel
- The Sapphires (2012) – Australian musical comedy drama film based on the 2004 stage play The Sapphires by Tony Briggs, which is loosely based on a real-life 1960s girl group that included Briggs' mother and aunt
- Saving the Titanic (2012) – Irish-German biographical drama television film dramatising the engineers and the boiler room crew who kept the furnaces and generators running as the Titanic sank, facilitating the survival of others
- The Sessions (2012) – erotic comedy-drama film based on the 1990 article "On Seeing a Sex Surrogate" by Mark O'Brien, a poet paralyzed from the neck down due to polio, who hired a sex surrogate to lose his virginity
- Shadow Dancer (2012) – British-Irish drama film based on a IRA member turned MI5 Informant
- Shahid (Hindi: शाहिद) (2012) – Indian Hindi-language biographical drama film based on the life of lawyer and human rights activist Shahid Azmi, who was assassinated in 2010
- She Made Them Do It (2012) – Canadian crime drama television film based on the true story of American murderer Sarah Jo Pender
- Shirdi Sai (Telugu: షిర్డీ సాయి) (2012) – Indian Telugu-language biographical film about the 19th-20th century spiritual guru Sai Baba of Shirdi who lived in western India
- Soegija (2012) – Indonesian epic historical drama film about national hero Albertus Soegijapranata
- Sri Ramakrishna Darshanam (Tamil: ஸ்ரீ ராமகிருஷ்ண தரிசனம்) (2012) – Singaporean-Indian Tamil-language biographical film based on the life and philosophy of 19th century Bengali mystic saint Ramakrishna
- Supremo (2012) – Philippine biographical film about the life of Katipunan Supremo (president) Andrés Bonifacio
- Süskind (2012) – Dutch biographical film depicting events in Amsterdam during the German occupation of the Netherlands where a group of people, including Walter Süskind, try to help children escape the Holocaust
- Tenchi: The Samurai Astronomer (Japanese: 天地明察) (2012) – Japanese biographical film chronicling the life of Yasui Santetsu, a 17th-century master of 'Go' who turned his attention to astronomy and created a new calendar for Japan
- This Life (Danish: Hvidsten gruppen) (2012) – Danish war drama film based on the activities of the Hvidsten Group, a Danish resistance group in World War II
- To Write Love on Her Arms (2012) – biographical drama film based on the life of troubled teenager Renee Yohe and the founding of To Write Love on Her Arms by Jamie Tworkowski, after he and others helped Yohe to overcome her challenges enough to be able to enter rehab
- Touch of the Light (Chinese: 逆光飛翔) (2012) – Taiwanese drama film based on true events in the life of Taiwanese pianist Huang Yu-Siang
- Tukaram (Marathi: तुकाराम) (2012) – Indian Marathi-language biographical film on the life of Saint Tukaram, who was a 17th-century Varkari saint, spiritual poet and devotee of Vitthala
- Unconditional (2012) – biographical drama film based on the actual story of Joe Bradford and the founding of Elijah's Heart, a non-profit organization, in 2005 to help children in need
- Underground: The Julian Assange Story (2012) – Australian biographical television film looking at the early career of WikiLeaks founder, Julian Assange
- Vinmeengal (Tamil: விண்மீங்கள்) (2012) – Indian Tamil-language semi-biographical film detailing the extraordinary struggle of a father, who is a magician, to give a normal life to his son who is born with Cerebral Palsy
- Viva Belarus! (Belarusian: Жыве Беларусь!) (2012) – Polish biographical drama film based on the true story of Franak Viačorka, activist of the Belarusian opposition
- The Vow (2012) – romantic drama film based on Kim and Krickitt Carpenter's story of Kim's memory loss following an accident
- We'll Take Manhattan (2012) – British biographical drama television film telling the story of the extramarital affair between photographer David Bailey and model Jean Shrimpton, and their one-week photographic assignment in New York City for Vogue in 1962
- Won't Back Down (2012) – drama film loosely based on the events surrounding the use of the parent trigger law in Sunland-Tujunga, Los Angeles in 2010
- You Are God (Polish: Jesteś Bogiem) (2012) – Polish biographical drama film telling the story of Polish hip-hop group Paktofonika
- Zabana! (Arabic: زبانة) (2012) – Algerian biographical war drama film chronicling the life of Ahmed Zabana, a man who fought for Algerian freedom in the Battle of Algiers
- Zero Dark Thirty (2012) – war thriller film based on the nearly decade-long international manhunt for Osama bin Laden, leader of the terrorist network Al-Qaeda, after the September 11 attacks
