= List of 2009 films based on actual events =

This is a list of films and miniseries that are based on actual events. All films on this list are from American production unless indicated otherwise.

== 2009 ==
- 3 Acts of Murder (2009) – Australian crime drama television film based on the true-life story of how author Arthur Upfield inadvertently inspired The Murchison Murders
- 12 Paces Without a Head (German: Zwölf Meter ohne Kopf) (2009) – German historical adventure film centering on the German folk hero Klaus Störtebeker, who was a pirate at the time
- 12 Winter (German: Zwölf Winter) (2009) – German crime drama television film based on the true story of two bank robbers who robbed a series of small banks throughout Germany and remained at large for 12 years before they were captured in August 2002
- 99 (2009) – Indian Hindi-language crime comedy film set against the 1999 cricket controversies
- 1066 The Battle for Middle Earth (2009) – British historical drama miniseries re-imagining the story of this decisive year of the Norman conquest of England, not from the saddles of kings and conquerors, but through the eyes of ordinary people caught up in its events
- A Model Daughter: The Killing of Caroline Byrne (2009) – Australian mystery drama television film based on alleged events surrounding the death of Caroline Byrne on 7 June 1995
- A Short Stay in Switzerland (2009) – British medical drama television film inspired by the true story of Dr Anne Turner, who took her own life in a Zurich clinic, having developed the incurable neurodegenerative disease progressive supranuclear palsy (PSP)
- Accident on Hill Road (Hindi: हिल रोड पर दुर्घटना) (2009) – Indian Hindi-language crime drama film based on the true story of Chante Mallard and her murder of Gregory Glenn Biggs
- Agora (Spanish: Ágora) (2009) – Spanish historical drama film about Hypatia, a mathematician, philosopher and astronomer in late 4th-century Roman Egypt, who investigated the flaws of the geocentric Ptolemaic system and the heliocentric model that challenges it
- Amelia (2009) – American-Canadian biographical drama film about the life of Amelia Earhart
- An Englishman in New York (2009) – British biographical film chronicling the years gay English writer Quentin Crisp spent in New York City
- April Showers (2009) – crime drama film based on the Columbine High School shootings
- The Army of Crime (French: L'Armée du crime) (2009) – French war drama film dealing with the development of the Manouchian Group, a 23-member resistance unit led by an Armenian exile, Missak Manouchian
- The Assailant (Portuguese: Besouro) (2009) – Brazilian action drama film about Besouro Mangangá, a Brazilian Capoeirista from the early 1920s, to whom were attributed some heroic and legendary deeds
- The Athlete (Amharic: እትሌቱ) (2009) – Ethiopian biographical sport drama film depicting a portrait of the marathon runner from Ethiopia, Abebe Bikila
- Balibo (2009) – Australian-East Timorese war drama film following the story of the Balibo Five, a group of journalists who were captured and killed while reporting on activities just prior to the Indonesian invasion of East Timor of 1975
- Barbarossa (2009) – Italian historical drama film concerned with the struggle of the Lombard League, which struggled to maintain independence from the Holy Roman Empire, led by the legendary Guelph warrior Alberto da Giussano
- Berdella (2009) – crime horror film based on the crimes of Robert Berdella, an American serial killer who raped, tortured, and murdered at least six men in Kansas City, Missouri during the 1980s
- Berlin 36 (2009) – German historical sport drama film telling the fate of Jewish track and field athlete Gretel Bergmann in the 1936 Summer Olympics
- Best: His Mother's Son (2009) – British biographical comedy television film chronicling the life of the late footballer George Best's mother, Ann, and her battles against alcoholism that would ultimately lead to her death at the age of 54
- The Blind Side (2009) – biographical sport drama film telling the story of Michael Oher, a football offensive lineman who overcame an impoverished upbringing to play in the National Football League (NFL) with the help of Leigh Anne and Sean Tuohy
- Bodyguards and Assassins (Cantonese: 十月圍城) (2009) – Hong Kong historical action film about Sun Yat-sen making a secret trip to British-ruled Hong Kong to discuss plans with fellow revolutionaries to start a revolution to overthrow the Qing Empire and establish a republic in China
- Bonded Parallels (Armenian: Խճճված զուգահեռներ) (2009) – Armenian historical war film influenced by the true story of an Armenian soldier during World War II in Norway
- The Boys Are Back (2009) – Australian-British drama film based on the 2000 book, The Boys Are Back in Town, by Simon Carr, about a sports writer who becomes a single parent in tragic circumstances
- Bright Star (2009) – British-Australian-French biographical romantic drama film based on the last three years of the life of poet John Keats and his romantic relationship with Fanny Brawne
- Broken Promise (Slovak: Nedodržaný sľub) (2009) – Slovak-Czech-American war drama film based on the true story of Jewish boy, and talented soccer player, Martin, who has to make risky lifetime decisions to survive in World War II when he sees his family is taken to Poland one by one
- The Canadiens, Forever (French: Pour toujours, les Canadiens!) (2009) – Canadian French-language historical sport drama film about the Montreal Canadiens centennial celebrations
- Carol I (2009) – Romanian historical drama film depicting the last days of the first Romanian king, Carol I of Hohenzollern-Sigmaringen, and the tough decisions he had to make in the summer of 1914 to please both Romanian Parliament and his relatives from the German Empire
- City of Life and Death (Mandarin: 南京！南京) (2009) – Chinese historical war drama film dealing with the Battle of Nanjing and the following massacre committed by the Japanese army during the Second Sino-Japanese War
- Coco Before Chanel (French: Coco avant Chanel) (2009) – French-Belgian biographical drama film detailing the early life of French fashion designer Coco Chanel
- Coco Chanel & Igor Stravinsky (2009) – French romantic drama film tracing a rumoured affair between Coco Chanel and Igor Stravinsky in Paris in 1920, the year that Chanel No. 5 was created
- The Consul of Sodom (Spanish: El cónsul de Sodoma) (2009) – Spanish biographical drama film about the Catalan poet Jaime Gil de Biedma
- The Countess (2009) – French-German historical crime thriller film based on the life of the notorious Hungarian countess Elizabeth Báthory
- The Courageous Heart of Irena Sendler (2009) – American-Canadian-Polish biographical war drama television film focusing on Irena Sendler, a Polish social worker who smuggled approximately 2,500 Jewish children to safety during World War II
- Creation (2009) – British biographical drama film about Charles Darwin's relationship with his wife Emma and his memory of their eldest daughter Annie, as he struggles to write On the Origin of Species
- The Damned United (2009) – British-American sport drama film based on David Peace's interpretation of Brian Clough's ill-fated tenure as football manager of Leeds United in 1974
- Deadliest Sea (2009) – Canadian biographical drama television film about the crew of the Kodiak, Alaska-based scallop fishing vessel St. Christopher
- Desert Flower (2009) – German biographical film based on the Somali-born model Waris Dirie's autobiography of the same name
- The Diary of Anne Frank (2009) – British biographical miniseries based on The Diary of a Young Girl originally written by Anne Frank from 1942 to 1944
- Don't Burn (Vietnamese: Đừng Đốt) (2009) – Vietnamese biographical drama film based on the posthumously published diary of Đặng Thùy Trâm, a battlefield surgeon for the People's Army of Vietnam and Vietcong during the Vietnam War
- The Donner Party (2009) – historical drama film based on the true story of the Donner Party, an 1840s westward traveling group of settlers headed for California
- Endgame (2009) – British historical drama film depicting the final days of apartheid, focusing on secret talks held between the African National Congress and the members of the National Party in a country house in Somerset, England
- Enid (2009) – British biographical television film based on the life of children's writer Enid Blyton
- Everyman's War (2009) – biographical war drama film based on the true story of Don Smith's heroic experience at the Battle of the Bulge while with the 94th Infantry
- Farewell (French: L'affaire Farewell) (2009) – French spy thriller film loosely based on the actions of the high-ranking KGB official, Vladimir Vetrov
- Felicitas (2009) – Argentine romantic drama film about the life of Felicitas Guerrero de Álzaga
- Five Minutes of Heaven (2009) – Irish thriller drama film reconstructing the historical killing of 19-year-old Jim Griffin by 17-year-old Alistair Little in 1975
- Flordelis (Portuguese: Flordelis: Basta uma Palavra para Mudar) (2009) – Brazilian biographical drama film based on the life of gospel singer and politician Flordelis
- Formosa Betrayed (2009) – political thriller film inspired by two actual events, one surrounding the death of Professor Chen Wen-chen of Carnegie Mellon University in 1981, and the other the 1984 assassination of journalist Henry Liu in California by Chen Chi-li and his fellow Bamboo Union members
- Fort Apache Napoli (Italian: Fortapàsc) (2009) – Italian biographical drama film about the fight against the Camorra and subsequent assassination of journalist Giancarlo Siani
- The Founding of a Republic (Mandarin: 建國大業) (2009) – Chinese historical drama film portraying the final years of the Chinese Communist Revolution that followed the end of the Second Sino-Japanese War
- The Front Line (Italian: La prima linea) (2009) – Italian crime drama film based on the memoirs of the Prima Linea terrorist Sergio Segio
- Generał Nil (2009) – Polish historical war film based on the life of general Emil August Fieldorf
- The General: The Gibraltar Assassination (Polish: Generał. Zamach na Gibraltarze) (2009) – Polish historical drama film based on the last days of General Władysław Sikorski during World War II
- Georgia O'Keeffe (2009) – biographical drama television film about noted American painter Georgia O'Keeffe and her husband, photographer Alfred Stieglitz
- Get Low (2009) – mystery drama film loosely based on a true story that happened in Roane County, Tennessee, in 1938 about a real person named Felix Bushaloo "Uncle Bush" Breazeale
- Gifted Hands: The Ben Carson Story (2009) – biographical drama television film based on the autobiography of neurosurgeon (and later politician) Ben Carson
- The Girl on the Train (French: La fille du RER) (2009) – French drama film about an aimless girl who lies about being the victim of a hate crime inspired by the story of Marie Leonie Leblanc, a woman in her twenties, who walked into a police station in Paris on 9 July 2004 claiming she had been the victim of an antisemitic attack on a suburban RER train
- Goemon (Japanese: 五右衛門) (2009) – Japanese historical drama film loosely based on the story of Ishikawa Goemon, a legendary outlaw hero who stole valuables from the rich and gave them to the poor
- Gracie! (2009) – British biographical drama television film about the life of Gracie Fields, covering her career before the Second World War and the decline in her popularity during the war
- Grey Gardens (2009) – biographical drama television film about the lives of Edith Bouvier "Little Edie" Beale and her mother Edith Ewing "Big Edie" Bouvier
- Hachi: A Dog's Tale (2009) – family biographical drama film telling the true story of the Akita dog named Hachikō who lived in Japan 1923–1935
- Harishchandrachi Factory (Marathi: हरिश्चंद्राची फॅक्टरी) (2009) – Indian Marathi-language biographical drama film about Dadasaheb Phalke, who made the first Indian feature film Raja Harishchandra (1913), and focusing on the struggle Phalke faced during its production
- Held Hostage (2009) – crime drama television film based on the true story of Michelle Renee Ramskill-Estey who was kidnapped by three masked men and held hostage until she is forced to rob a bank which is the only option she has to save her only child's life while they are both wired to explode
- The Hell of '63 (Dutch: De Hel van '63) (2009) – Dutch historical sport drama film based on the 1963 edition of the Elfstedentocht, a long-distance ice skating tour in the Netherlands when only 69 of the nearly 10,000 participants were able to finish the race, due to the extremely low temperatures of −18 °C, powder snow and a harsh eastern wind
- Hellsinki (Finnish: Rööperi) (2009) – Finnish biographical crime film describing the exploits of professional criminals in Finland from 1966 to 1979, based on true stories
- Henry VIII: The Mind of a Tyrant (2009) – British historical miniseries offering some new insights into life and times of Henry VIII
- Hilde (2009) – German biographical film depicting the life of the German actress Hildegard Knef
- Hurricane Season (2009) – sport drama film based on the true story of John Ehret High School's 2005–06 State championship team who came together after Hurricane Katrina
- I, Don Giovanni (Italian: Io, Don Giovanni) (2009) – Italian-Austrian-Spanish historical drama film narrating the life of Lorenzo da Ponte, an Italian Freemason who wouldn't give up his libertinism, despite being ordered to do so as a priest of the Roman Catholic Church
- I Hope They Serve Beer in Hell (2009) – comedy drama film loosely based on the work and persona of writer Tucker Max
- I Love You Phillip Morris (2009) – French black comedy film based on a 1980s and 1990s real-life story of con artist, impostor and multiple prison escapee Steven Jay Russell
- In Her Skin (2009) – Australian crime thriller film based on the true story of the murder of 15-year-old Rachel Barber, Ivan Southall's granddaughter, who went missing on March 1, 1999
- In the Beginning (French: À l'origine) (2009) – French biographical drama film telling the dramatized true story of Philippe Berre, a Frenchman with a reputation as an impostor
- The Informant! (2009) – biographical crime comedy film depicting Mark Whitacre's involvement as a whistleblower in the lysine price-fixing conspiracy of the mid-1990s, based on the 2000 non-fiction book The Informant, by journalist Kurt Eichenwald
- Ingenious (2009) – comedy drama film based on the true story of some friends who are trying to come up with an invention, before hitting on an idea
- The Interrogation (Finnish: Kuulustelu) (2009) – Finnish war drama film focusing on the interrogation of Kerttu Nuorteva
- Into the Storm (2009) – British-American biographical war film about Winston Churchill and his days in office during the Second World War
- Invictus (2009) – American-South African biographical sport drama film about the events in South Africa before and during the 1995 Rugby World Cup
- Jean Charles (2009) – British-Brazilian biographical drama film depicting the life of Jean Charles de Menezes, the Brazilian immigrant wrongly shot dead by the Metropolitan Police at Stockwell tube station in London on 22 July 2005, after being mistaken for a terrorist
- John Rabe (2009) – German-Chinese-French biographical film based upon John Rabe's published wartime diaries
- Journey to Mecca (2009) – historical drama film charting the first real-life journey made by the Islamic scholar Ibn Battuta from his native Morocco to Mecca for the Hajj (Muslim pilgrimage), in 1325
- Julie & Julia (2009) – biographical comedy drama film contrasting the life of chef Julia Child in the early years of her culinary career with the life of young New Yorker Julie Powell, who aspires to cook all 524 recipes in Child's cookbook in 365 days, a challenge she described on her popular blog, which made her a published author
- Kerala Varma Pazhassi Raja (Malayalam: കേരളവർമ്മ പഴശ്ശിരാജ) (2009) – Indian Malayalam-language epic historical drama film based on the life of Pazhassi Raja, a king who fought against the East India Company in the 18th century
- The Killing Room (2009) – psychological thriller film based on the Project MKUltra programme by the CIA, with fictionalized characters
- The Last Days of Lehman Brothers (2009) – British biographical television film summarising the events that occurred over the weekend preceding Monday, 15 September 2008, when Lehman declared bankruptcy
- The Last Station (2009) – German-Russian-British biographical drama film chroncicling the final months of Leo Tolstoy's life
- The Least Among You (2009) – biographical drama film based on the true story of Presbyterian Rev. Dr. Charles Marks' formative years
- Leslie, My Name Is Evil (2009) – Canadian comedy crime film about Leslie Van Houten, a troubled teenager who eventually becomes a follower of Charles Manson and is charged, convicted, and sentenced to death in August 1969 for the murders of Leno and Rosemary LaBianca
- Lula, Son of Brazil (Portuguese: Lula: O Filho do Brasil) (2009) – Brazilian biographical drama film based on the early life of Brazilian president Luiz Inácio Lula da Silva
- Maggots and Men (2009) – historical biographical film focusing on the Kronstadt rebellion, an uprising of sailors at the Kronstadt naval base in the aftermath of the Russian Revolution
- Manikyam of Paleri: A Midnight Murder Story (Malayalam: പാലേരി മാണിക്യം: ഒരു പാതിരാകൊലപാതകത്തിന്റെ കഥ) (2009) – Indian Malayalam-language historical mystery film based on the true story of the first recorded murder case that was registered after the formation of the first democratically elected communist government in Kerala
- Mao's Last Dancer (2009) – Australian biographical sport drama film based on professional dancer Li Cunxin's 2003 autobiographical memoir of the same name
- Margaret (2009) – British biographical drama television film about the life of Margaret Thatcher and her fall from the premiership in the 1990 leadership election, with flashbacks telling the story of Thatcher's defeat of Edward Heath in the 1975 leadership election
- Maysa: When the Heart Sings (Portuguese: Maysa: Quando Fala o Coração) (2009) – Brazilian biographical miniseries about the life and career of Maysa Matarazzo
- Micro Men (2009) – British biographical drama television film focusing on the rivalry between Sir Clive Sinclair, who developed the ZX Spectrum, and Chris Curry, the man behind the BBC Micro
- Middle Men (2009) – crime drama film based on the experiences of Christopher Mallick, who was previously associated with the Internet billing companies Epoch and ePassporte
- The Mighty Macs (2009) – sport drama television film telling the story of Cathy Rush who was the head women's basketball coach at Immaculata College
- Moana (2009) – Italian biographical drama miniseries recounting the life of iconic Italian pornographic actress Moana Pozzi
- Moonshot (2009) – British historical drama television film depicting the story leading up to the landing of Apollo 11's Lunar Module Eagle on the surface of the Moon on 20 July 1969
- Mulan (Mandarin: 花木蘭) (2009) – Chinese action war film based on the life of Hua Mulan
- My One and Only (2009) – comedy drama film loosely based on a story about George Hamilton's early life on the road with his mother and brother, featuring anecdotes that Hamilton had told to producer Robert Kosberg and Merv Griffin
- My Son, My Son, What Have Ye Done (2009) – American-German crime drama film loosely based on the story of Mark Yavorsky, an actor at the University of San Diego who reenacted a scene from Orestes by murdering his mother with an antique saber
- Natalee Holloway (2009) – biographical mystery television film based on Beth Holloway's book about the 2005 disappearance of her daughter Natalee Holloway
- Normal (2009) – Czech crime thriller film depicting a fictional account of the life of serial killer Peter Kürten, told from the point of view of his defense lawyer
- Notorious (2009) – biographical drama film based on the life of Brooklyn-based hip-hop artist The Notorious B.I.G.; dramatizing key events in his life: his criminal lifestyle, arrest and release from prison, his relationships with Sean Combs, Tupac Shakur, Lil' Kim and Faith Evans, his involvement in the East Coast–West Coast hip hop rivalry and his drive-by-shooting murder on March 9, 1997
- Nowhere Boy (2009) – British biographical drama film based on Julia Baird's biography of her half-brother, the musician John Lennon
- The Pagan Queen (2009) – American-Czech historical drama film about Libuše, the Czech tribal queen of 8th century Bohemia who envisioned the city of Prague and founded the first Czech dynasty with a farmer called Přemysl, the Ploughman
- The Perfect Game (2009) – sport drama film based on the events leading to the 1957 Little League World Series, which was won by the first team from outside the United States, the Industrial Little League of Monterrey, Mexico, who defeated the heavily favored U.S. team
- Polanski Unauthorized (2009) – biographical drama film about the life of film director Roman Polanski
- Polytechnique (2009) – Canadian biographical crime film based on the 1989 École Polytechnique massacre (also known as the "Montreal Massacre")
- Pope Joan (German: Die Päpstin) (2009) – German-British-Italian-Spanish epic historical drama film based on American novelist Donna Woolfolk Cross' novel of the same name about the legendary Pope Joan
- Prayers for Bobby (2009) – biographical drama television film depicting the true story of the life and legacy of Bobby Griffith, a gay young man who killed himself in 1983 due to his mother's homophobia, based on the book of the same name by Leroy F. Aarons
- Prince of Tears (Mandarin: 淚王子) (2009) – Taiwanese historical drama film telling the story of a family embroiled in the tragic "White Terror" suppression of political dissidents that was wrought during the 1950s by the Kuomintang government (KMT) after their acquisition of Taiwan in the 1940s
- Princess Kaiulani (2009) – British-American biographical drama film based on the life of Princess Kaʻiulani of the Kingdom of Hawaiʻi
- Public Enemies (2009) – biographical crime drama film chronicling the final years of the notorious bank robber John Dillinger as he is pursued by FBI agent Melvin Purvis, Dillinger's relationship with Billie Frechette, as well as Purvis' pursuit of Dillinger's associates and fellow criminals John "Red" Hamilton, Homer Van Meter, Harry Pierpont, and Baby Face Nelson
- Purple Sea (Italian: Viola di mare) (2009) – Italian romantic drama film based on the non-fiction novel Minchia di re written by Giacomo Pilati, telling the love story between Angela and Sara in 19th-century Sicily
- Red and White (Indonesian: Merah Putih) (2009) – Indonesian action war film depicting Indonesia's struggle for independence in 1945–1949
- Red Cliff II (Mandarin: 赤壁2) (2009) – internationally co-produced epic war film based on the Battle of Red Cliffs (208–209 AD) and the events at the end of the Han dynasty and immediately prior to the Three Kingdoms period in Imperial China
- Red Riding (2009) – British crime drama miniseries using fictionalized accounts of the investigation into the Yorkshire Ripper, a serial killer that stalked the Yorkshire area of England in the 1970s and 1980s
- Room and a Half (Russian: Полторы комнаты, или сентиментальное путешествие на родину) (2009) – Russian biographical drama film depicting a fictionalized account of writer Joseph Brodsky
- Safe Harbor (2009) – biographical drama television film based on the beginnings of the Safe Harbor Boys Home, a residential educational program for at risk teenaged boys on the Saint Johns River in Jacksonville, Florida, founded by Doug and Robbie Smith
- Same Same but Different (2009) – German drama film based on the true story of Sreykeo Sorvan and Benjamin Prüfer
- Saviors in the Night (German: Unter Bauern) (2009) – German-French historical drama film based on the memories of Marga Spiegel, a Jewish woman who was persecuted by the Nazis and survived with the help of farmers in Westphalia
- Sister Smile (French: Sœur Sourire) (2009) – French-Belgian biographical drama film based on the story of The Singing Nun
- The Soloist (2009) – French-British-American biographical drama film based on the true story of Nathaniel Ayers, a musician who developed schizophrenia and became homeless
- The Spell (2009) – British horror film loosely based on the true story of Emma Whale
- St. George Shoots the Dragon (Serbian: Свети Георгије убива аждаху) (2009) – Serbian historical war film depicting several wars within Serbia's history including the First Balkan War and World War I
- Stoic (2009) – Canadian art prison drama film centring on a true incident which occurred in Siegburg prison in 2006 where three prisoners raped, tortured and ultimately forced their cellmate to commit suicide over a period of ten hours in a series of events that began with a poker bet involving the consumption of a tube of toothpaste
- The Stoneman murders (Hindi: द स्टोनमैन मर्डर) (2009) – Indian Hindi-language neo-noir crime thriller film based on the real life Stoneman serial killings that made headlines in the early 1980s in Bombay
- The Storm (Dutch: De Storm) (2009) – Dutch historical disaster film about the North Sea flood of 1953
- The Sword with No Name (Korean: 불꽃처럼 나비처럼) (2009) – South Korean historical drama film based on a fictionalized account of Empress Myeongseong
- Taken in Broad Daylight (2009) – crime thriller television film based on the real-life kidnapping of Nebraska teenager Anne Sluti, who was abducted and held for six days in April 2001 by Anthony Steven Wright, also known as Tony Zappa
- Taking Chance (2009) – historical drama television film based on the recollections of U.S. Marine Lt. Col Michael Strobl, a real person, who accompanied the remains of Lance Corporal Chance Phelps, a Marine fatally wounded by gunfire near Baghdad during the Iraq War, from Dover Air Force Base to Dubois, Wyoming in April 2004
- Taking Woodstock (2009) – musical comedy drama film about the Woodstock Festival of 1969
- Through the Mist (French: Dédé, à travers les brumes) (2009) – Canadian French-language biographical drama film about rock musician Dédé Fortin of Les Colocs
- The Time That Remains (2009) – British-Italian-Belgian-French biographical drama film depicting an account of the creation of the Israeli state from 1948 to the 2009
- Too Late to Say Goodbye (2009) – American-Canadian crime drama television film based on the 2007 true crime book of the same name by Ann Rule
- Tsar (Russian: Царь) (2009) – Russian historical drama film about two years in the life of Tsar Ivan the Terrible, his relationship with Metropolitan Philip of Moscow and the events of the Oprichnina era
- Van Diemen's Land (2009) – Australian biographical thriller film following the story of the infamous Irish convict, Alexander Pearce
- Vincere (2009) – Italian biographical drama film based on the life of Benito Mussolini's first wife, Ida Dalser
- Vision (German: Vision – Aus dem Leben der Hildegard von Bingen) (2009) – German biographical drama film telling the story of Hildegard of Bingen, the famed 12th century Benedictine nun, Christian mystic, composer, philosopher, playwright, physician, poet, naturalist, scientist and ecological activist
- Vivaldi, the Red Priest (Italian: Vivaldi, il prete rosso) (2009) – Italian biographical television film about the life of composer Antonio Vivaldi, who was also a Catholic priest
- Wesley (2009) – historical biographical drama film about John Wesley and Charles Wesley, the founders of the Methodist movement
- White Lightnin' (2009) – British drama film inspired by the life of Jesco White, an Appalachian mountain dancer
- Winter of Frozen Dreams (2009) – crime drama film following the story of Barbara Hoffman, a Wisconsin biochemistry student and prostitute convicted of murder in the first televised murder trial ever
- Within the Whirlwind (2009) – German-Belgian-Polish biographical drama film about Yevgenia Ginzburg's 18 years in prisons and labor camps under Joseph Stalin's rule
- The Young Victoria (2009) – British historical drama film based on the early life and reign of Queen Victoria, and her marriage to Prince Albert of Saxe-Coburg and Gotha
- Zamora (Spanish: Zamora: tierra y hombres libres) (2009) – Venezuelan historical war film depicting Ezequiel Zamora, general of the liberals during the Federal War in Venezuela between 1859 and 1863
- Zen (Japanese: 禅) (2009) – Japanese biographical drama film about Dōgen Zenji, a Japanese Zen Buddhist teacher
