= List of price fixing cases =

This is a partial list of notable price fixing and bid rigging cases.

== Australia ==
=== Airlines ===
The Australian Competition & Consumer Commission (ACCC) has taken several airlines to the Federal Court of Australia seeking penalties for alleged price fixing contraventions. As of 2011, the ACCC's activities are:

==== Qantas ====
The ACCC instituted proceedings against Qantas seeking penalties for alleged price fixing contraventions relating to fuel surcharges applied to international carriage of air cargo between 2002 and early 2006. The conduct concerned collusion between competitors over fuel surcharges which the ACCC alleged and Qantas admitted had the purpose and likely effect of fixing or maintaining a component of the price for air cargo services. The Federal Court in Sydney ordered Qantas to pay $20 million in pecuniary penalties for breaching the price fixing provisions of the Trade Practices Act 1974.

==== British Airways ====
The ACCC instituted proceedings against British Airways seeking penalties for alleged price fixing contraventions relating to fuel surcharges applied to international carriage of air cargo between 2002 and early 2006. The Federal Court in Sydney ordered British Airways to pay $5 million in pecuniary penalties for breaching the price fixing provisions of the Trade Practices Act 1974. The ACCC instituted proceedings alleging British Airways reached an understanding with Lufthansa Cargo in relation to the imposition of fuel surcharges on some of its international air cargo services between 2002 and early 2006.

==== Singapore Airlines Cargo ====
The ACCC alleged that Singapore Airlines Cargo, between 2001 and 2005, entered into arrangements or understandings with other international air cargo carriers that had the purpose or effect of fixing the price of a fuel surcharge and a security surcharge that was applied to air cargo carried by Singapore Airlines Cargo and other airlines including to and from Australia.

==== Air France ====
The ACCC instituted proceedings against Air France seeking penalties for alleged price fixing between early 2003 and 2006. The alleged contraventions relate to fuel surcharges applied to international carriage of air cargo during that period. The Federal Court in Sydney ordered pecuniary penalties ($6 million in total with KLM) for breaching the price fixing provisions of the Trade Practices Act 1974. The ACCC alleged the airline reached understandings with other international airlines in relation to the imposition of fuel surcharges applied to international carriage of air cargo during that period between early 2003 and 2006. Air France admitted to making and giving effect to illegal price fixing understandings with Lufthansa, repeatedly exchanging assurances with Lufthansa in the implementation of fuel surcharge increases for international carriage of air cargo across their global networks.

==== Koninklijke Luchtvaart Maatschappij (KLM) ====
The ACCC instituted proceedings against KLM seeking penalties for alleged price fixing between early 2003 and 2006. The alleged contraventions relate to fuel surcharges applied to international carriage of air cargo during that period. The Federal Court in Sydney ordered pecuniary penalties ($6 million in total with Air France) for breaching the price fixing provisions of the Trade Practices Act 1974. The ACCC alleged the airline reached understandings with other international airlines in relation to the imposition of fuel surcharges applied to international carriage of air cargo during that period between early 2003 and 2006. KLM admitted to making and giving effect to illegal price fixing understandings with Lufthansa, repeatedly exchanging assurances with Lufthansa in the implementation of fuel surcharge increases for international carriage of air cargo across their global networks.

==== Martinair Holland ====
The ACCC instituted proceedings against Martinair seeking penalties for alleged price fixing between early 2003 and 2006. The alleged contraventions relate to fuel surcharges applied to international carriage of air cargo during that period. The Federal Court in Sydney ordered pecuniary penalties of $5 million for breaching the price fixing provisions of the Trade Practices Act 1974. The ACCC alleged the airline reached understandings with other international airlines in relation to the imposition of fuel surcharges applied to international carriage of air cargo during that period between early 2003 and 2006. Martinair admitted that by no later than early 2003, it had arrived and gave effect to illegal price fixing understandings with KLM and Cargolux that they would have discussions and exchange and confirm information with each other in relation to the application of fuel surcharges on cargo carried internationally by air across their respective global networks.

==== Cargolux ====
The ACCC instituted proceedings against Cargolux seeking penalties for alleged price fixing between early 2003 and 2006. The alleged contraventions relate to fuel surcharges applied to international carriage of air cargo during that period. The Federal Court in Sydney ordered pecuniary penalties of $5 million for breaching the price fixing provisions of the Trade Practices Act 1974. The ACCC alleged the airline reached understandings with other international airlines in relation to the imposition of fuel surcharges applied to international carriage of air cargo during that period between early 2003 and 2006. Cargolux admitted to making and giving effect to illegal price fixing understandings with each of Lufthansa, Air France and KLM that each of them would impose a fuel surcharge on cargo carried internationally by air across their networks, (except where local conditions in a particular port or in a particular geographic area prevented the imposition, or full imposition, of the fuel surcharge).

==== Cathay Pacific ====
The ACCC instituted proceedings in the Federal Court against Cathay Pacific. The ACCC alleged that between 2000 and 2006, Cathay Pacific Airways Ltd entered into over 70 arrangements or understandings with other international air cargo carriers that had the purpose or effect of fixing the price of a fuel surcharge, a security surcharge and rates that were applied to air cargo carried by Cathay Pacific and other airlines. The ACCC alleged that the arrangements or understandings were reached in countries including Singapore, Indonesia, Hong Kong, United Arab Emirates, India, Japan and Italy. The ACCC sort declarations, injunctive relief, pecuniary penalties, and costs.

==== Emirates ====
The ACCC instituted proceedings in the Federal Court against Emirates. The ACCC alleged that between 2002 and 2006, Emirates entered into arrangements or understandings with other international air cargo carriers that had the purpose and effect of fixing the price of certain fuel surcharges, security surcharges and rates that were applied to air cargo carried by Emirates and other airlines. The ACCC alleged that the arrangements or understandings were reached in countries including Singapore, Indonesia, Hong Kong, United Arab Emirates and India. The ACCC sort declarations, injunctive relief, pecuniary penalties, and costs.

==== Garuda Indonesia ====
The ACCC instituted proceedings in the Federal Court against Garuda Indonesia. The ACCC alleged that between 2001 and 2006, Garuda Indonesia entered into arrangements or understandings with other international air cargo carriers that had the purpose or effect of fixing the price of a fuel surcharge and a security surcharge that were applied to air cargo carried by PT Garuda Indonesia Ltd and other airlines. The ACCC alleged that the arrangements or understandings were reached in Indonesia and Hong Kong. The ACCC sort declarations, injunctive relief, pecuniary penalties, and costs.

==== Thai Airways ====
The ACCC alleged that between 2001 and 2006, Thai Airways entered into arrangements or understandings with other international air cargo carriers in specific countries that had the purpose or effect of fixing the price of fuel surcharges and security surcharges that were applied to air cargo carried by Thai Airways and other airlines. The ACCC alleged that the arrangements or understandings were reached in Singapore, Indonesia and Hong Kong – plus Thailand in the case of a security surcharge called a crisis surcharge – for surcharges applied to cargo originating in those countries. The ACCC sort declarations, injunctive relief, pecuniary penalties, and costs.

==== Korean Air ====
The ACCC instituted proceedings in the Federal Court against Korean Air. The ACCC alleged that between 2001 and 2006, Korean Air entered into arrangements or understandings with other international air cargo carriers that had the purpose or effect of fixing the price of a fuel surcharge, a security surcharge and a customs fee that were applied to air cargo carried by Korean Air and other airlines. The ACCC alleged that the arrangements or understandings were reached in Korea, Indonesia and Hong Kong for surcharges applied to cargo originating in those countries and in Indonesia for a customs fee applied to cargo originating in that country. The ACCC sort declarations, injunctive relief, pecuniary penalties, and costs.

==== Malaysia Airlines ====
The ACCC instituted proceedings in the Federal Court against Malaysia Airlines and its wholly owned cargo subsidiary MASkargo. The ACCC alleged that between 2001 and 2006, Malaysia Airlines and Malaysia Airlines Cargo entered into arrangements or understandings with other international air cargo carriers that had the purpose or effect of fixing the price of a fuel surcharge and a security surcharge that were applied to air cargo carried by them and other airlines. The ACCC alleged that arrangements or understandings were reached in Indonesia and Hong Kong for fuel surcharges applied to cargo originating in those countries. The ACCC also alleged arrangements or understandings were reached in Indonesia, Hong Kong and Singapore for a security surcharge applied to cargo originating in those countries. The ACCC sort declarations, injunctive relief, pecuniary penalties, and costs.

==== Japan Airlines ====
The ACCC instituted proceedings in the Federal Court today against Japan Airlines. The ACCC alleged that between 2002 and 2006, Japan Airlines, Ltd. entered into arrangements or understandings with other international air cargo carriers that had the purpose or effect of fixing the price of a fuel surcharge and a security surcharge that were applied to air cargo carried by them and other airlines. The ACCC alleged that arrangements or understandings were reached in Singapore, Hong Kong and Japan for fuel surcharges applied to cargo originating in those countries. The ACCC also alleged arrangements or understandings were reached in Singapore and Hong Kong for a security surcharge applied to cargo originating in those countries. The ACCC sort declarations, injunctive relief, pecuniary penalties, and costs. The Federal Court in Melbourne ordered a $5.5 million penalty against Japan Airlines International Co Ltd (JAL) for breaching the price fixing provisions of the Trade Practices Act 1974*. JAL admitted to making and giving effect to illegal price fixing understandings with other international airlines that each of them would impose a fuel surcharge and an insurance and security surcharge on cargo carried internationally by air across their networks.

==== Air New Zealand ====
The ACCC instituted proceedings in the Federal Court against Air New Zealand. The ACCC alleged that between 2002 and 2006, Air New Zealand entered into arrangements or understandings with other international air cargo carriers that had the purpose or effect of fixing the price of a fuel surcharge and a security surcharge that were applied to air cargo carried by them and other airlines. The ACCC alleged that arrangements or understandings were reached in Singapore Hong Kong and Japan for fuel surcharges applied to cargo originating in those countries. The ACCC also alleged arrangements or understandings were reached in Singapore and Hong Kong for a security surcharge applied to cargo originating in those countries. The ACCC sort declarations, injunctive relief, pecuniary penalties, and costs.

=== Cosmetics skincare ===
In 2007, skincare cosmetics company Jurlique was fined AUD$3.4 million where the company entered into agreements with resellers where one of the terms included that the products were not to be sold for prices less than a price specified by Jurlique.

== Canada ==
- Bread price-fixing in Canada

== Denmark ==
=== Forest products ===
- 2007 Christmas tree price fixing scandal

== EU convictions ==
=== Beer ===
On 18 April 2007 The European Commission imposed fines on Heineken €219.3m, Grolsch €31.65m and Bavaria €22.85m for operating a price fixing cartel in the Netherlands, totalling €273.7m. InBev, (formerly Interbrew), escaped without a penalty because it provided "decisive information" about the cartel which operated between 1996 and 1999 and others in the EU market. The brewers controlled 95% of the Dutch market, with Heineken claiming a half and the three others 15% each.

Neelie Kroes said she was "very disappointed" that the collusion took place at the very highest (boardroom) level. She added, Heineken, Grolsch, Bavaria and InBev tried to cover their tracks by using code names and abbreviations for secret meetings to carve up the market for beer sold to supermarkets, hotels, restaurants and cafes. The price fixing extended to cheaper own-brand labels and rebates for bars.

This is simply unacceptable: that major beer suppliers colluded to up prices and to carve up markets among themselves.

— EU Competition Commissioner Neelie Kroes

In December 2001 Interbrew, Danone (former owner of Kronenbourg), and two other smaller brewers were fined €91m for operating a cartel in Belgium while four Luxembourg companies were fined €448,000 the same month.

In 2004, Heineken and Kronenbourg, the two dominant brewers in France, were fined €2.5m – with the penalty reduced for co-operating. A similar inquiry into an alleged Italian cartel was closed without proceedings while the British and German beer markets were specifically excluded.

=== Heavy electrical (switchgear) ===
In January 2007 Siemens was fined €396 million over its role in a collusion scandal. The European Commission handed out a massive €750 million in fines to Siemens, Alstom, Areva, Schneider Electric and Japanese firms Fuji Electric, Hitachi, Mitsubishi Electric, Toshiba and Japan AE Systems. Switzerland's ABB Group was a whistleblower and escaped without any fine from the commission. Regulators found that the companies rigged bids for contracts and fixed prices in the market for gas-insulated switchgear – equipment is used to control the flow of energy in electricity grids. Siemens' fine was the biggest of the companies involved because it was a ringleader, the Commission said. About 30 business premises and private homes were searched as part of the investigation.

The cartel swapped information on offers from customers and operated a quota system for the division of work. Bids were rigged so that tenders went to whichever firm was due work under the quota system. "Code names were used for both companies and individuals. They relied on anonymous email addresses for communication and used encryption for sending messages," said the commission. "The commission has put an end to a cartel which has cheated public utility companies and consumers for more than 16 years," said EU Competition Commissioner Neelie Kroes.

== France ==
=== Telecoms ===
In 2005, Orange France, SFR and Bouygues Telecom were found guilty and fined €534m for engaging in anti-competitive practices.

=== Personal hygiene/health and beauty products ===
The Autorité de la concurrence handed out fines to Colgate-Palmolive, Henkel, Unilever, Procter & Gamble, Reckitt Benckiser, Sara Lee, SC Johnson, Bolton Solitaire], Groupe Vendôme SA, Gillette, L'Oreal, Beiersdorf and Vania totalling €948.9million in 2016 for price-fixing on personal hygiene products.

=== Dessert foods ===
In 2019, the 6 companies behind the "Compote Cartel", a price-fixing scheme for children desserts products, were fined €58.3million for engaging in a sophisticated plan to artificially inflate the prices of their products via secret coordination. Andros, Lactalis, Materne, Charles & Alice, Valade and Conserves France were found guilty by the Autorité de la concurrence, while a seventh company, Coroos, was exonerated because its directors cooperated with the investigation, allowing the prosecutors to prove their case against the six others.

== Iceland ==
- Icelandic oil price fixing scandal

== United Kingdom ==
=== Dairy products ===
In December 2007, Sainsbury's, Asda, Safeway, Dairy Crest, Robert Wiseman Dairies and The Cheese Company all admitted that they had secretly swapped information to make shoppers pay more for milk and cheese in a £270m price-fixing conspiracy between 2002 and 2003. The cartel agreed in principle with the Office of Fair Trading that they conspired against the interests of consumers. In their defense, the corporations stated they had been under pressure to help farmers hit by foot-and-mouth, however, lead OFT investigator Andrew groves said "I think it is reasonable to say we don't doubt the purpose initially was to pass money back to farmers but, in general, there is no evidence that farm gate price increased as a result of the initiative. We don't know what happened to the money."

All the major UK store chains except Waitrose and Marks & Spencer were implicated in the OFT inquiry. It was accepted by Asda, Sainsbury and Safeway that stores increased the price of milk as a result of collusion. Dairy Crest and Wiseman allegedly acted as middle men, passing on sensitive information about prices to their supposed rivals. Tesco and Morrisons were accused of collusion too, but denied taking part. The allegations against Tesco involved cheese as well as milk and butter.

The retailers could theoretically have faced fines of up to 10 per cent of their worldwide turnover, which in Tesco's case would have amounted to £4.3bn. In 2007 the Office of Fair Trading told Sainsbury's, Asda, Safeway, Dairy Crest, Wiseman and The Cheese Company they faced maximum fines of £116m. In August 2011, the OFT announce fines of £49.51m. Sainsbury's told the London Stock Exchange that its fine was £26m. The fine for Safeway is thought to be between £8m and £10m; £9m for Dairy Crest and £6m for Robert Wiseman. Dairy processor Arla alerted the OFT to the infringement and received immunity from fines following full co-operation with authorities. Consumer advocate Which? Ltd complained that, despite overpaying £270m, consumers would not receive any refunds.

=== Construction ===
In April 2008, The Office of Fair Trading named 112 companies that it says colluded to inflate the cost of a wide range of contracts worth billions of pounds, including tenders for schools, universities and hospitals.

The list includes several publicly listed companies, including Balfour Beatty, Kier Group and Carillion, with 80 of the firms have already admitted participating in some form of bid-rigging, or have applied for leniency in return for assisting the OFT. The allegations centre around "cover pricing", in which firms secretly agreed the prices they would submit during a tender process. A firm that did not want to win the contract would submit a price that was much too high. In some cases, the eventual successful bidder would then reward them with a secret payment. This bid rigging often involved false invoices. The OFT declined to comment on the value of the fraud.

=== Financial ===
In April 2003, The London office of ABN Amro was fined £900,000 for helping a US client, Oechsle International Advisers, to rig share prices. The fine was the FSA's fifth biggest, and is the largest involving market abuse on the London Stock Exchange.

ABN's then joint head of the UK equity trading desk, Michael Ackers, has been fined £70,000 for "market misconduct." The FSA decided that traders in ABN Amro Equities (UK), known as AAE, "accepted improper instructions whose apparent purpose was to push the closing market price of certain shares to a higher level than would otherwise have been the case". This happened on three separate occasions between April and October 1998 in respect of shares in Carlton Communications, British Biotech, Volkswagen and Metro. Angelo Iannone, the head of ABN's international sales trading desk in New York, had had a long-standing relationship with Oechsle and one of its fund managers, Andrew Parlin. They agreed to increase the price of the shares in question at the end of certain days' trading, to make the prices look better in clients' portfolios.

Trading in stocks simply to move the market price is a serious abuse: it distorts market forces and undermines investors' confidence in the integrity of the prices quoted on exchanges...These were not isolated events. The repeated nature of the breaches demonstrates the absence of a robust compliance environment on the firm's trading floor. We view with particular seriousness misconduct that occurs in the context of a firm's inadequate investment in compliance procedures, policies and training. Investors need to be confident that they are dealing in clean and orderly markets.

— Carol Sergeant, Managing Director of the FSA

== United States ==
=== Agribusiness ===
- Lysine price-fixing conspiracy

=== Air travel ===
In August 2007 British Airways (BA) was fined £121.5 million for price-fixing. The fine was imposed by the Office of Fair Trading (OFT) after BA admitted to the price-fixing of fuel surcharges on long haul flights. The allegation first came to light in 2006 when Virgin Atlantic reported the events to the authorities after it found staff members from BA and Virgin Atlantic were colluding. Virgin Atlantic have since been granted immunity by both the OFT and the United States Department of Justice who have been investigating the allegations since June 2006. The United States Department of Justice later announced that it would fine British Airways $300 million for price fixing.

The allegations are thought to be linked to the resignation of commercial director Martin George and communications chief Iain Burns. Although BA said fuel surcharges were "a legitimate way of recovering costs", in May 2007 it put aside £350 million for legal fees and fines.

=== Alcoholic beverages ===
- Wine and Spirits Fair Dealing Act

=== Computer components ===
- DRAM price fixing

=== Heavy electrical equipment ===
A federal district court in February 1961 fined 29 electrical manufacturing companies and 45 individuals a total of $1,924,500 for violating the antitrust laws by fixing prices and rigging bids on heavy electrical equipment, some of which was sold to the Government. (See also: Allis-Chalmers § 1960s and 1970s.)

=== Metals ===
- Aluminium price-fixing conspiracy

=== Music publishing ===
- CD price fixing

== See also ==
- List of largest pharmaceutical settlements
