= Plug-in electric vehicles in Iceland =

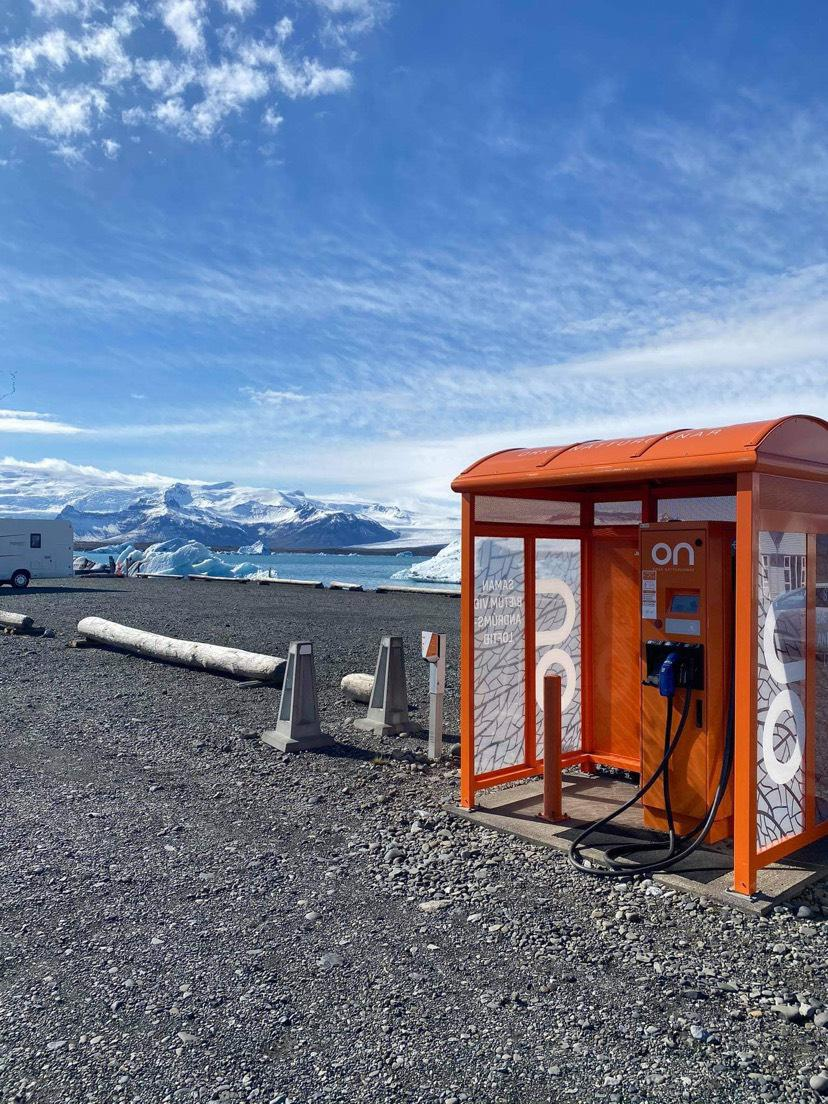
Electric Vehicle Charging Station at Jökulsárlón Glacier Lagoon, Iceland.

The adoption of plug-in electric vehicles in Iceland is the second highest in the world after Norway, and fully supported by the government. As of 2022, the market share of electric vehicles in Iceland is around 60%, the second-highest in the world behind Norway. Around 14% of the country's passenger car fleet is electrified as of 2022.

Iceland is well suited to the adoption of EVs as driving distances are relatively short, the country has cheap, surplus renewable energy (99.98% renewable electricity in 2022) and has to import all of its fossil fuels. Electric vehicles (EVs) are a key component of the country's environmental policy and compliance with the Paris Agreement, with road transport contributing 20% of Iceland's total greenhouse gas emssions. The Icelandic government plans to ban the import of petrol and diesel cars after 2030.

== History ==
In 1979, a university engineering professor from the University of Iceland, Gísli Jónsson obtained funding from the university to purchase a Jet Industries Electra Van 500 from the United States. The 4 passenger van had a 50–80 km range and used 16 6-volt batteries. He was an advocate for electric vehicle adoption and the purpose of the van was to test the vehicle in Icelandic conditions and demonstrate the use of electric vehicles in Iceland. It was eventually sold in 1983 and used as a service vehicle for an aluminium smelter and later on a farm in Mývatnssveit.

In 1992, a short lived committee was formed by the Minister for Industry to investigate the viability of electric vehicles in Iceland, it did not achieve its goals and was shut down in 1994. A Peugeot 106 electric vehicle was imported in March 1998 by the Reykjavík Electric Utility (now Orkuveita Reykjavíkur) as a demonstration vehicle.

There were a handful of other demonstration and experimental EVs imported in the 1990s, including 2 in Akureyri by the postal service and local utility as well as one by Landsvirkjun. There were only around 10 registered EVs throughout the 1990s until 2010.

Tax incentives were introduced in 2012, and with the introduction of more mass market vehicles such as the Nissan Leaf and the BMW i3, EV sales saw exponential growth. 2013 was the first year EV market share surpassed 1%, increasing to around 11% by 2017

EV market share grew from 5.7% in 2016 to 59.5% in 2021 with the introduction of many EV models by major manufacturers in the late 2010s. Tesla Motors opened a service and sales center in Iceland in September 2019 which accelerated BEV registrations in Iceland; the Tesla Model 3 became the best selling vehicle in Iceland for 2020, with 858 sold. The Nissan Leaf is the most sold fully electric vehicle in Iceland, with over 3,000 vehicles registered since 2010.

== Statistics ==
In 2022, the market share of battery electric vehicles (BEV) was 33% and plug-in hybrid electric vehicles (PHEV) was 23%. This brings Iceland's plug-in market share to just under 56%, the second highest market share in the world.

As of April 2023 there were 19,215 BEVs and 20,982 PHEVs in registed use in Iceland. BEVs are around 7% of the country's car fleet and PHEVs another 7%. This brings EVs to ~14% of the total passenger car fleet in Iceland. New registrations of electric and hybrid vehicles grew by 150% between 2016 and 2017.

Fleet size of passenger electric vehicles in Iceland
	2010	2011	2012	2013	2014	2015	2016	2017	2018	2019	2020	2021	2022
Total	204,736	206,112	210,070	213,113	217,454	226,321	240,490	257,100	267,383	269,825	269,615	275,243	290,100
BEV	15	15	15	50	225	521	904	1,611	2,403	4,068	6,993	11,489	19,215
PHEV	0	0	0	23	47	128	518	1,959	5,031	8,047	10,407	15,304	20,982
EV Total	15	15	15	73	272	649	1,422	3,570	7,434	12,115	17,400	26,793	40,197
BEV	0.01%	0.01%	0.01%	0.02%	0.10%	0.23%	0.38%	0.63%	0.90%	1.51%	2.59%	4.17%	6.62%
PHEV	0.00%	0.00%	0.00%	0.01%	0.02%	0.06%	0.22%	0.76%	1.88%	2.98%	3.86%	5.56%	7.23%
EV Total	0.01%	0.01%	0.01%	0.03%	0.13%	0.29%	0.59%	1.39%	2.78%	4.49%	6.45%	9.73%	13.85%

Market Share of EVs for new passenger vehicles Iceland
Type	2010	2011	2012	2013	2014	2015	2016	2017	2018	2019	2020	2021	2022
BEV	0.09%	0.04%	0.38%	1.01%	1.93%	2.67%	1.92%	3.42%	4.05%	8.64%	27.53%	28.46%	33.14%
PHEV	0.00%	0.00%	0.11%	0.28%	0.42%	1.11%	3.75%	8.43%	13.51%	14.42%	22.21%	31.00%	23.81%
EV Total	0.09%	0.04%	0.49%	1.30%	2.35%	3.78%	5.67%	11.85%	17.56%	23.06%	49.75%	59.46%	56.95%

Top 12 cumulative sales of battery electric vehicle models 2010-2022
Model	Cumulative Sales
Nissan Leaf	3,007
Tesla Model 3	1,499
Tesla Model Y	869
VW e-Golf	807
Hyundai Kona	792
Kia e-Niro	610
Audi e-tron	572
Renault Zoe	363
Kia e-Soul	337
VW ID.4	323
Kia EV6	306
Volvo XC40	290

== Government policy ==
Since 2012, there has been no value-added tax on electric vehicles up to a maximum value of 6.5 million ISK. The exemption has a current quota of 15,000 vehicles, which has been extended several times since it entered into force, and is expected to be extended to 20,000 in 2022. Tax incentives for plug-in hybrid vehicles was cut in half in 2021 and are due to be phased out in 2022, to encourage sales of fully electric vehicles. Import duty is also waived. Road tax is also in the lowest bracket, as it is based on the CO_{2} consumption of the vehicle.

The Icelandic government has also funded the development of fast charging stations around the country, to enable travel further around the island. The government spent around 400 million ISK in the years 2016–2020 in grants to companies such as Orka Nátturunnar (part of Orkuveita Reykjavíkur), Olís, Ísorka and N1 to set up 50-150 kW fast charging stations.

In 2020, laws were changed giving apartment owners the right to install an EV charging stations in their complex, as well as new building codes including the requirement for new electric installations to designed in mind for electric vehicles

From 2012 to 2022, the Icelandic government spent around 28 billion ISK in tax incentives for EVs.

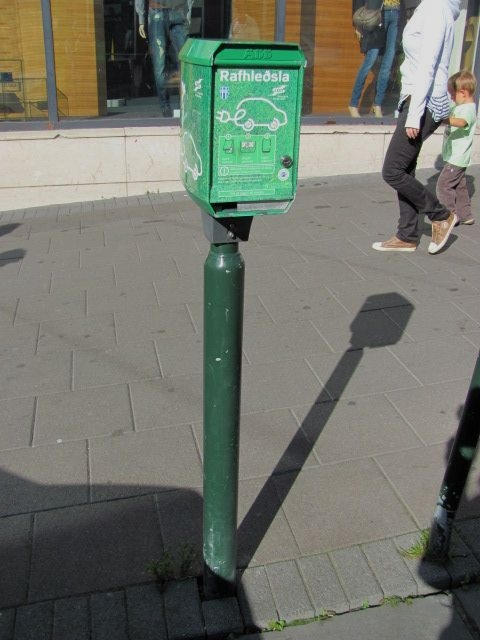
In the mid-2000s, Orkuveita Reykjavíkur installed outlets in various locations including downtown Reykjavík, pictured.

=== City of Reykjavík ===
The City of Reykjavík allows electric vehicles (without studded tyres) to park for free for 2 hours; this was restricted to fully electric vehicles only in 2019. The City of Reykjavík also began installing charging stations for street parking in 2019, and also began offering grants for apartment buildings to install communal charging infrastructure.

== Infrastructure ==
Iceland's grid is almost 100% powered from renewable energy, from a mix of mostly hydroelectric power and geothermal power. There is ample and cheap supply of energy for use by electric vehicles. Electricity supplies to individual homes and businesses is mostly three-phase.

EVs in Iceland generally use the European standard Type 2 (Mennekes) connector and CCS Combo Type 2. Some older vehicles use Type 1 (J1772) and CHAdeMO. As of 2022, there are over 445 charging stations in Iceland, including 89 DC fast chargers (50-350kW power) and the remainder being AC (mostly 3-phase 22kW).

Public EV charging infrastructure in Iceland began in the mid-2000s when Orkuveita Reykjavíkur began installing EV charing stations at the town hall and in a few locations in Reykjavík, as a demonstration of electric vehicle infrastructure. In 2014, Orka Nátturunnar (a subsidiary of Orkuveita Reykjavíkur) set up Iceland's first 10 CHAdeMO DC fast charging stations, around Reykjavík and in the towns of Selfoss, Borganes and Akranes. Until 2018, they were free of charge. Between 2016 and 2017, Orkusalan (a local power company), gifted Level 2 charging stations to 80 local municipalities, kickstarting a low power charging network in Iceland.

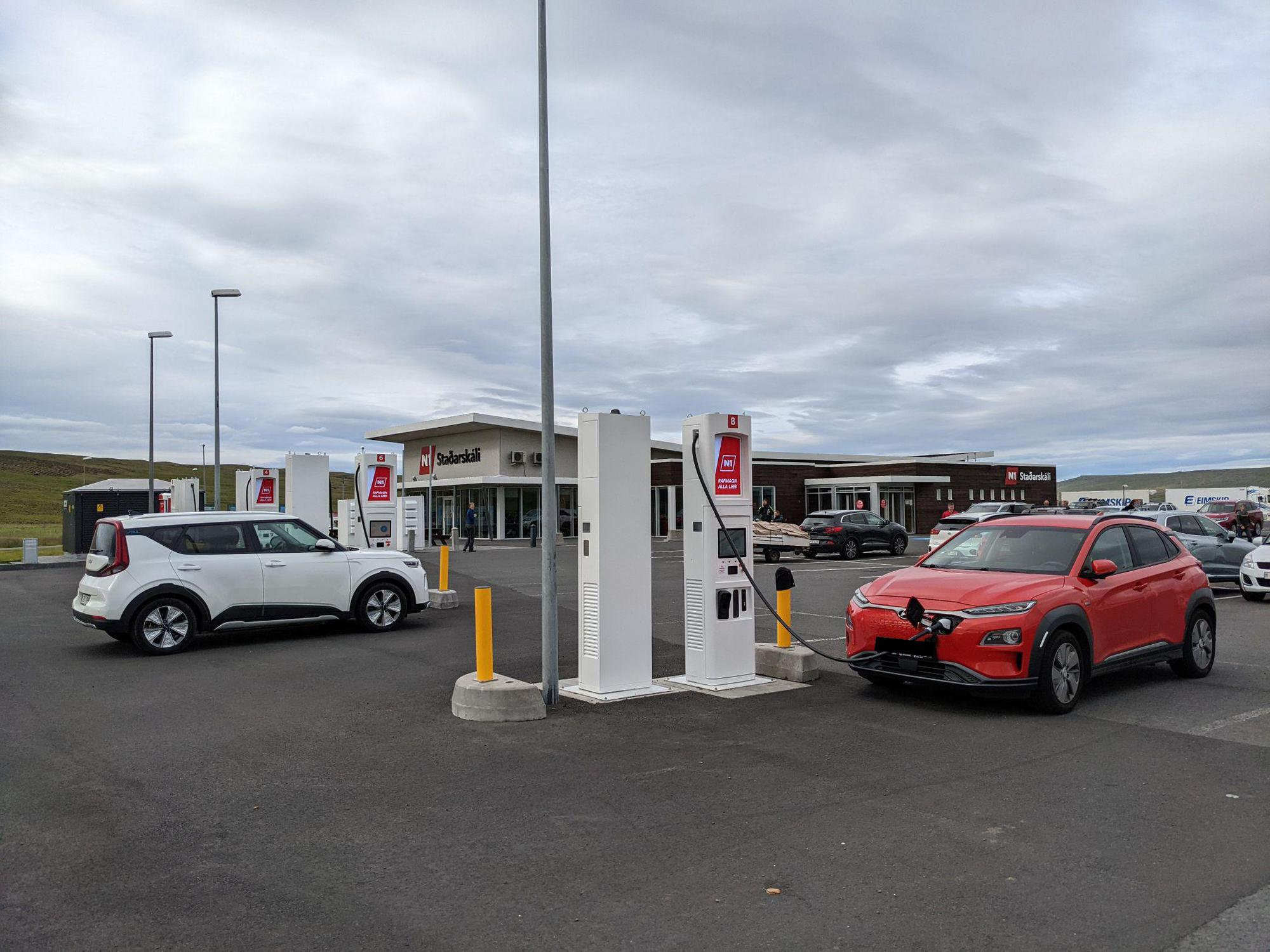
8 stall 150kW charging station at an N1 service station at Staðarskáli, Iceland. There are 8 additional Tesla Superchargers here, not visible in the photo.

In 2018, a major milestone was reached in Iceland's EV charging infrastructure, when the ring road (Route 1) was covered by DC fast charging stations with a distance of within 100 km between each station.

Orka Náturunnar's network has subsequently been expanded and upgraded to CCS technology and as of 2022 they have around 50 DC fast chargers with power levels from 50 kW to 225 kW.

In the late 2010s, various other companies began opening their own charging networks such as Ísorka and Tesla. The City of Reykjavík and other municipalities have installed charging stations on street parking spots. Companies Olís and N1 also began installing fast chargers at their service stations around the same time. Tesla opened its first Supercharger station in December 2019 and has 7 Supercharger locations as of 2022, and Instavolt in 2023.

== Public transportation ==
In 2018, Strætó bs purchased of four electric buses from Chinese manufacturer Yutong. The range of the buses is approximately 320 kilometres (200 mi), which is equivalent to 17 service-hours and are used in the Greater Reykjavík Area In 2019, they added an additional 10 electric buses to their fleet bringing the total to 14, and in 2021 they announced their intention to convert their fleet to zero emissions by 2030.

== See also ==
- Electricity sector in Iceland
- Energy in Iceland
