= Electricity sector in Iceland =

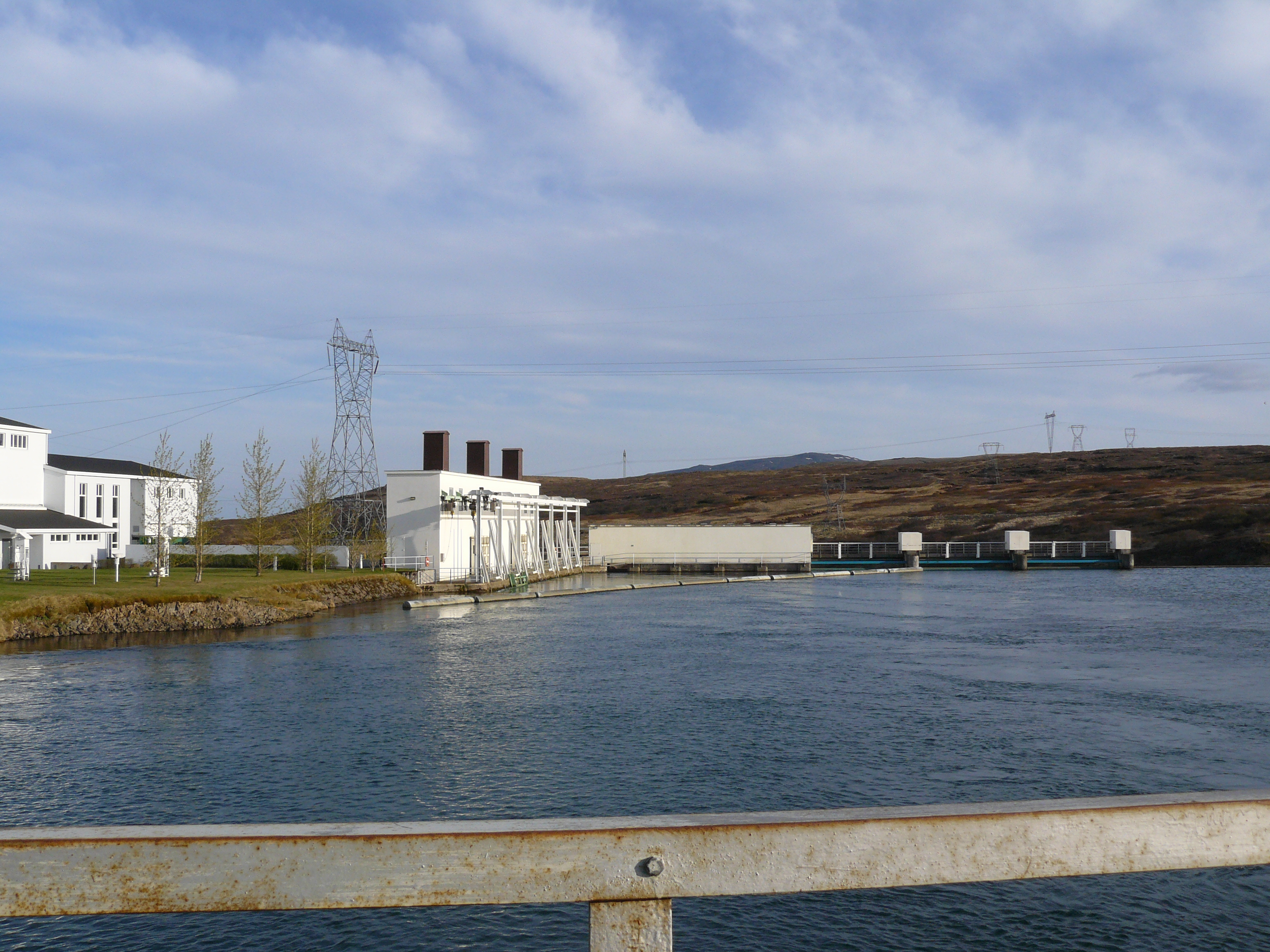
Most electricity in Iceland is generated by hydroelectric power stations. Írafossstöð was built in 1953 and is one of Iceland's oldest hydroelectric plants still operating, located just south of Þingvallavatn.

The electricity sector in Iceland is 99.98% reliant on renewable energy: hydro power, geothermal energy and wind energy.

Iceland's consumption of electricity per capita was seven times higher than the EU 15 average in 2008. The majority of the electricity is sold to industrial users, mainly aluminium smelters and producers of ferroalloy. The aluminum industry in Iceland used up to 70% of produced electricity in 2013.

Landsvirkjun is the country's largest electricity producer. The largest local distribution companies are RARIK, Orkuveita Reykjavíkur and Hitaveita Suðurnesja. Electricity production increased significantly between 2005 and 2008 with the completion of Iceland's largest hydroelectric dam, Kárahnjúkar Hydropower Plant (690MW). Iceland's national electrical grid is owned and run by Landsnet and is composed of 3,000 km of transmission lines and approximately 70 substations.

== Production and Consumption ==
Iceland's electricity is produced almost entirely from renewable energy sources: hydroelectric (70%) and geothermal (30%). Less than 0.02% of electricity generated came from fossil fuels (in this case, fuel oil). In 2013 a pilot wind power project was installed by Landsvirkjun, consisting of two 77m high turbines with an output of 1.8MW.

There are plans to increase wind power share in Iceland, with many onshore and offshore wind farm opportunities. In 2025, Landsvirkjun began construction of Iceland's first wind farm project called Vaðölduver. It will have an installed power of 120 MW and is projected to commence operations in 2026–2027. According to Statistics Iceland the total electricity consumption was 7,958 GWh in 2002, 11,480 GWh in 2007, and 17,068 GWh in 2012. Electricity production increased by 24 MWh/person from 2005 to 2008, an increase of 83%.

Two remote islands disconnected from the Icelandic grid rely on diesel generators, Grímsey and Flatey.

Iceland electricity production by source

Installed Electrical Capacity and Production in Iceland (2020)
Source	Installed Capacity		Production	
Source	kW	%	MWh	%
Hydroelectric	2,106,934	71.77%	13,156,972	68.79%
Geothermal	755,040	25.72%	5,960,602	31.16%
Wind	1,800	0.06%	6,660	0.03%
Fuel	71,971	2.45%	3,067	0.02%
Total	2,935,745	100%	19,127,302	100%

== Transmission ==
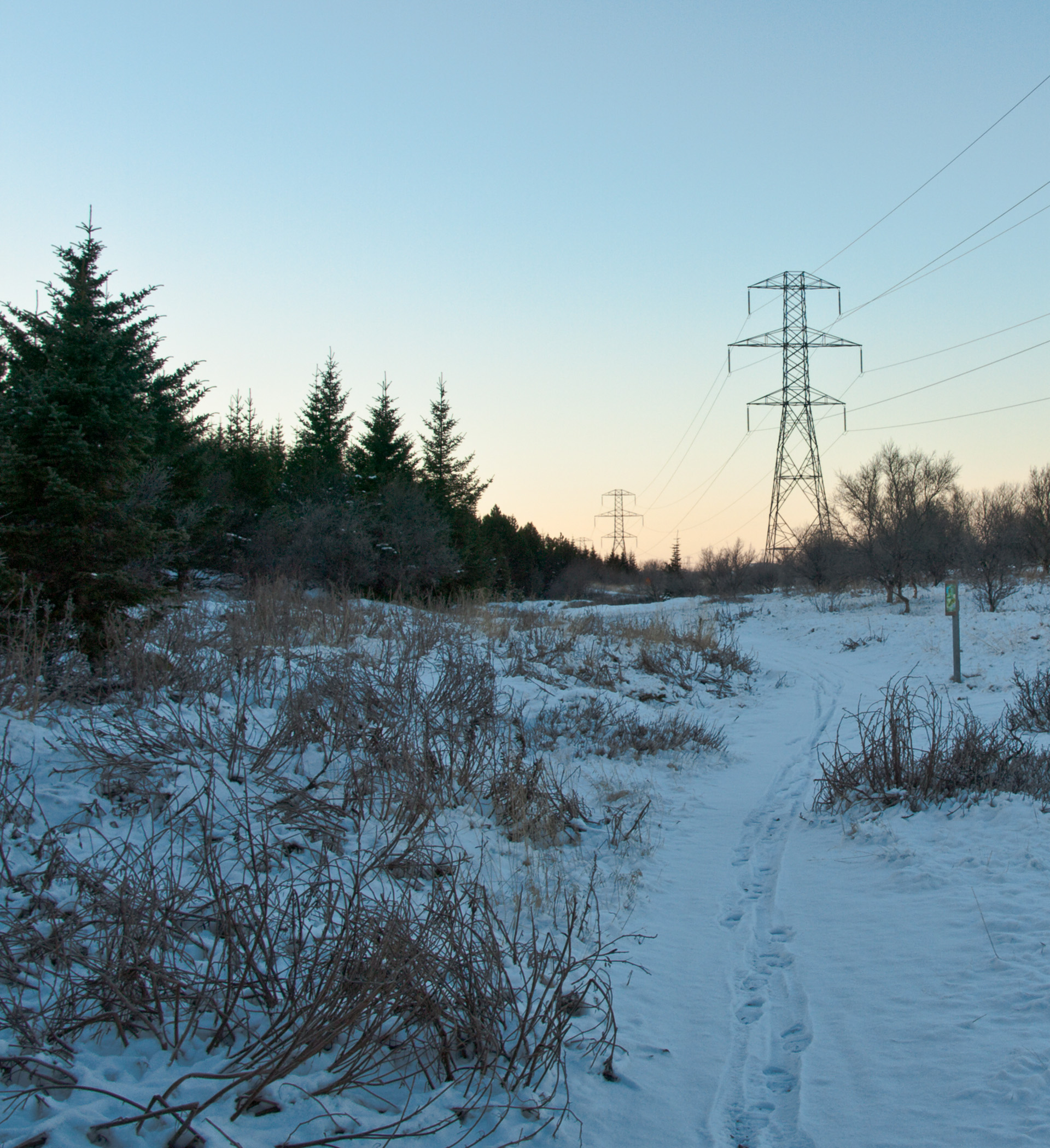
220kV transmission lines in the vicinity of Reykjavík

The Icelandic Transmission System Operator (TSO) is Landsnet, a company jointly owned by three state-owned power companies: RARIK, Landsvirkjun and Orkubú Vestfjarða. The Icelandic TSO is compensated for all transmission costs by retail and wholesale distributors. Landsnet's transmission network operates at voltages of 220kV, 132kV and a few 66kV lines and serves the whole country and is composed of 3,000 km of transmission lines and around 70 substations.

== Connection to the rest of Europe ==
Former map of existing and planned HVDC interconnectors in Europe in 2012, Icelink labelled as number 1.

There are plans to connect the Icelandic grid with the UK using a subsea High-Voltage DC (HVDC) interconnector, with a potential capacity of up to 1.2GW, called Icelink. It would be the world's longest submarine HVDC cable, if built. This would allow Iceland to export excess energy to UK and in turn linking it to a wider European super grid. The project is in planning stages and is controversial in Iceland due to fears of increased domestic electricity prices as well as environmental damage from the resulting increase in power plants.

In the 2019 United Kingdom general election, the Democratic Unionist Party included in their manifesto a version of Icelink in which Iceland would instead be connected to Northern Ireland.

Iceland is active with the sale of Certificates of Origin in Europe. On 27th of April 2023 the Association of Issuing Bodies (AIB) suspended the export of Guarantees of Origin (GO) from Iceland due to the suspect of possible double counting. The ban was later lifted.

== Distribution ==
Electricity distribution is controlled by the following utilities with local monopolies:

- Veitur (Reykjavík and Capital Region)
- RARIK (rural areas)
- Orkubú Vestfjarða (Westfjords)
- Norðurorka (Akureyri and surrounding area)
- HS Veitur (Reykjanes peninsula, Selfoss, Vestmannaeyjar and Hafnafjörður)

Retail consumers of electricity are bound to pay a distribution fee (per kWh) to their local utility, but are free to purchase electricity from any provider.

== Competition ==
The Icelandic electricity market is geographically isolated. The market was closed for competition prior to 1 July 2003. Almost all electricity was supplied by Landsvirkjun and sold through regional distribution companies. Landsvirkjun had a monopoly position on investment in generation. Full market opening began in 2006 e.g. with the opportunity to switch supplier. Contracts for large scale energy users were in general long term, up to 30 years with options for extension.

Landsvirkjun, the largest electricity producer, had 76% annual production in 2007. The majority of the electricity is used in industry, mainly aluminium smelters and producers of ferroalloy. Landsvirkjun does not participate directly in the retail market for households and smaller businesses.

Orkuveita Reykjavíkur and Hitaveita Suðurnesja also entered into the market for energy intensive users in the late 2000s. The households heated with electricity, not many, receive subsidies to make their heating costs comparable to hot water heating.

Orkusalan was established in 2006 as a joint venture between Landsvirkjun, and two large operators. It is now wholly owned by RARIK.

As of 2022, new retail resellers of electricity have come to market such as N1 Rafmagn, Straumlind and Orka Heimilanna. They have wholesale agreements to resell electricity mostly from Landsvirkjun.

== See also ==
- Energy in Iceland
- List of power stations in Iceland
