= Lysine price-fixing conspiracy =

1990s effort to raise the price of lysine

The lysine price-fixing conspiracy was an organized effort during the mid-1990s to raise the price of the animal feed additive lysine. It involved five companies that had commercialized high-tech fermentation technologies, including Archer Daniels Midland (ADM), Ajinomoto, Kyowa Hakko Kogyo, Sewon America Inc. and Cheil Jedang Ltd. A criminal investigation resulted in fines and three-year prison sentences for three executives of ADM who colluded with the other companies to fix prices. The other four companies settled with the United States Department of Justice Antitrust Division in September through December 1996. Each firm and four executives from the Asian firms pleaded guilty as part of a plea bargain to aid in further investigation against ADM. The cartel had been able to raise lysine prices 70% within their first nine months of cooperation.

The investigation yielded $105 million in criminal fines, a record antitrust penalty at the time, including a $70 million fine against ADM. ADM was fined an additional $30 million for its participation in a separate conspiracy in the citric acid market and paid a total fine of $100 million. Three former high-ranking ADM executives were convicted in September 1998 after a ten-week jury trial. Buyers of lysine in the United States and Canada sued and recovered $80 to $100 million in damages from the five cartel members, and ADM paid $38 million to settle mismanagement suits by its shareholders.

The lysine cartel was the first successful prosecution of an international cartel by the U.S. Department of Justice (DOJ) in more than 40 years. Since then, the DOJ has discovered and successfully prosecuted nearly 20 international cartels.

== ADM's role ==
The company and senior ADM executives were indicted on federal criminal charges for simultaneously engaging in price-fixing in the international lysine and citric acid markets. Three of ADM's top officials, including vice chairman Michael D. Andreas, were eventually sentenced to federal prison in 1999 to a total of 99 months, an antitrust record at the time. Moreover, in 1997, the company was fined $100 million, the largest antitrust fine in U.S. history at the time. ADM was later fined almost $50 million by the antitrust authorities of Canada, Mexico, and the European Union.

The FBI learned of the lysine price-fixing conspiracy from Mark Whitacre, then Divisional President of ADM's BioProducts Division, because his wife threatened to inform the FBI if he did not. Whitacre only then told the FBI that he and other ADM executives were involved in price-fixing agreements with other rival businesses around the world. The FBI and Whitacre attended and listened in on the cartel’s meetings in cities such as Tokyo, Paris, Mexico City, and Hong Kong. During Whitacre's undercover tenure, the FBI collected hundreds of hours of video and audio tapes that documented crimes committed by executives from around the world fixing the prices of food additives in the largest price-fixing case in history at the time (1996).

ADM ultimately settled federal charges for more than US$100 million and paid hundreds of millions of dollars more ($400 million alone on the high-fructose corn syrup class action case) to plaintiffs and customers. Furthermore, several Asian and European lysine and citric acid producers that conspired to fix prices with ADM paid criminal fines in the tens of millions of dollars to the U.S. government. Several executives, including the former Vice Chairman of ADM, served time in federal prison as a result. The ADM investigation, in turn, convinced antitrust prosecutors that price-fixing was a far more pervasive problem than they had suspected and led to prosecutions of cartels in vitamins, fax paper, and graphite electrodes. European and Canadian regulators have started to crack down on the problem, too. Once a crime that rarely attracted the notice of federal authorities, price-fixing is now under attack by governments around the world. Billions of dollars have already been paid in antitrust fines to the U.S. government since Whitacre first blew the whistle in 1992.

The investigation and prosecution of ADM and some of its executives has been reported to be one of the "best documented corporate crimes in American history". Whitacre was later charged with and pleaded guilty to committing a $9 million fraud that occurred during the same time period he was working for the FBI.

== Popular adaptations ==
External videos
- Part One of Booknotes interview with Kurt Eichenwald on The Informant, February 4, 2001, C-SPAN
- Part Two of Booknotes interview, February 11, 2001, C-SPAN

The Informant is a nonfiction thriller book written by journalist Kurt Eichenwald and published in 2000 by Random House that documents the case and the involvement of ADM executive Mark Whitacre. It was the primary source for episode 168 of This American Life titled "The Fix Is In" and was adapted into the 2009 film The Informant! starring Matt Damon, which was released September 18, 2009.

== See also ==
- United States v. Archer Daniels Midland Co.
- Antitrust
- Price fixing cases
