= Landsnet =

- Industry: Electricity transmission
- Founded: 2005
- Founder: Icelandic government
- Headquarters: Reykjavík, Iceland
- Key people: Haraldur Tryggvason Klein, Chairman; Ragna Árnadóttir, President and CEO
- Services: Electric power transmission
- Owner: The Icelandic government (93.22%) and Orkuveita Reykjavíkur (6.78%).
- Website: landsnet.is/

Landsnet (Icelandic pronunciation: [ˈlan(t)sˌnɛːt], lit. 'National Grid') is a transmission system operator of the Icelandic high-voltage power grid. It is a public company owned by the Icelandic government (93.22%) and Orkuveita Reykjavíkur (6.78%). It is a member of the European Network of Transmission System Operators for Electricity.

Landsnet was established in 2005 by splitting the splitting the high-voltage transmission network from Landsvirkjun and RARIK. The Icelandic government acquired shares previously held by Landsvirkjun, RARIK and Orkubú Vestfjarða in December 2022.
