= Cypress Systems =

Biotech company headquartered in Madera, California

- Type: Private
- Industry: Biotechnology
- Founded: 1979; 47 years ago
- Founder: Paul A. Willis
- Headquarters: Madera, California, United States
- Key people: Mark Whitacre, CSO and President of Operations
- Website: cypressingredients.com

Cypress Systems, Inc. is a biotech company headquartered in Madera, California and is best known for its research, in collaboration with the National Cancer Institute (NCI), regarding the use of selenium supplementation for the prevention of a variety of cancers. Cypress Systems, Inc. also manufactures selenium, zinc, and chromium for the nutraceutical industry.

In 1983, the now-deceased Larry C. Clark conducted a Nutritional Prevention of Cancer (NPC) study. This historic trial claimed that selenium supplementation prevented a variety of cancers, a claim which has not been validated by later enquiry, as there is no vidence selenium supplementation helps prevent cancer.

The Chief Science Officer (CSO) of Cypress is Mark Whitacre. In the 1990s, Whitacre spent nine years in federal prison for embezzling over 9 million dollars from his former employer, ADM Archer Daniels Midland. He embezzled the funds while he was working with the FBI as a whistleblower. He is the highest level executive of a Fortune 500 company in US history to turn whistleblower.

In August 2024, the company relaunched the brand as Cypress Minerals.
