= Conspiracy of Fools =

2005 book

- Author: Kurt Eichenwald
- Audio read by: Stephen Lang
- Publisher: Broadway Books, New York
- Publication date: 2005
- Pages: 742
- ISBN: 978-0-7679-1178-8
- OCLC: 474721230
- Dewey Decimal: 333.79
- LC Class: HD9502.U54E5736 2005

Conspiracy of Fools is a 2005 book by American journalist and author Kurt Eichenwald detailing the Enron scandal.

== Synopsis ==
In Conspiracy of Fools, Eichenwald, who covered the 2001 collapse of Enron for the New York Times, tells the story of the scandal. Enron's Chief Financial Officer (CFO) Andrew Fastow is depicted as voraciously greedy, using front corporations and partnerships, paying himself "management" and "consultant" fees as if he were an outsider, all while cooking Enron's books to show fictitious profits. In the 1980s there were questionable activities at the company, but the bulk of the events depicted in the book occur from 1997 onward and led to Enron's collapse.

In addition to Fastow, there are stories of the complicity of Enron's auditors (at Arthur Andersen), their lawyers (internal and external), the senior management (Kenneth Lay and Jeffrey Skilling), Fastow's partner in many of his deals, Michael Kopper, and Enron's board of directors.

The picture that emerges of Enron is that of an out-of-control corporate culture that ignored the basic principles of business, allowing it to be manipulated by greedy incompetents for their own personal gain. The focus on reporting profits — rather than actually making money — created a situation that both encouraged and enabled a small group of insider criminals to game the system. Enron's business losses were masked by accounting tricks, while the insiders raked off huge "profits" and bonuses for themselves.

The game was eventually undone by huge losses, bad investments and the structure of the outside partnerships themselves, the solvency of which depended on ever-rising Enron stock prices. When Enron's stock began to fall, the financial structures imploded, leaving Enron with billions of dollars in losses and few assets.

Eichenwald also reminds readers that Enron fell not just because of the greed of the company people, but also because of the greed of thousands of investors who fell for this Ponzi scheme.

== See also ==
- Accounting scandals
