= United States v. Archer Daniels Midland Co. =

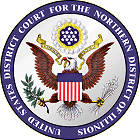
- Court: United States District Court for the Northern District of Illinois
- Defendant: Archer Daniels Midland Company
- Prosecution: United States
- Citation: 96-CR-00640

Court membership
- Judge sitting: Ruben Castillo

Keywords
- Antitrust, price fixing, Sherman Antitrust Act, lysine, citric acid

United States v. Archer Daniels Midland Co. was a criminal case filed on October 15, 1996, in which the United States alleged that Archer Daniels Midland Company (ADM) and other corporations and individuals engaged in a conspiracy to fix and maintain prices of lysine and citric acid and to restrain or eliminate competing suppliers of these additives in violation of Section 1 of the Sherman Antitrust Act (15 U.S.C. § 1). ADM entered into a plea agreement in which ADM pleaded guilty to both antitrust counts and agreed to pay a combined fine of $100 million ($70 million for the lysine count and $30 million for the citric acid count). This is equivalent to $192.10 million in present-day terms and was at the time the largest antitrust fine ever imposed.

The United States' charges against ADM were the second round of charges brought as a result of the U.S. Department of Justice's antitrust investigation into the food and feed additives industries. A few months earlier, in August 1996, the Japanese firms Ajinomoto Co., Inc. and Kyowa Hakko Kogyo Co. Ltd. and U.S.-based Korean subsidiary Sewon America, Inc. and their executives agreed to pay more than $20 million combined for their participation in the lysine conspiracy. The Department of Justice recovered more than $195 million in fines arising from its investigation.

== See also ==
- Lysine price-fixing conspiracy
