= Christmas tree production in Denmark =

By 2008 Christmas tree production in Denmark totalled around 9 million trees and Denmark was one of Europe's largest producers of natural Christmas trees. By far the most popular species grown in Denmark is the sought after Nordmann fir. Between 1999 and 2007 Danish tree production jumped from 6-7 million trees annually to 9-12 million trees annually. In 2009 the Danish Christmas Tree Growers Association (DCTGA) was convicted in a price fixing scheme that resulted in fines for the association and its executives.

== Market ==
Most of the Danish Christmas tree crop is exported to Germany, along with Britain, France and the Netherlands. In 2008, importers paid between 85 and 90 kroner (11-12 euros, 14-15 dollars) for each Danish Christmas tree, this represented a 10 to 20 percent increase over 2007. The year of the price fixing scandal a 2 m Nordmann fir sold domestically for 350 kroner (47 euros, 59 dollars). Right before charges were filed in the 2007 price fixing scandal, one Danish farmer reporter selling 2 m tall trees for 200 kroner ($39) wholesale.

== Trees ==
The most popular species for Christmas trees in Denmark, and most of Europe is the Nordmann fir. The Nordmanns grown in Denmark are said to be highly sought after. The director of the Danish Christmas Tree Growers Association has stated that the Danish Nordmann is the "Rolls-Royce of trees" and called it "coveted". In 1999 most of the trees grown in Denmark were Nordmann firs, that year, out of 6-7 million total trees, 1.5 million were Norway spruce, 300,000 were noble fir and the remainder were Nordmann fir.

== Production history ==
Christmas tree production in Denmark started shortly after the end of World War II but really began to increase during the 1990s. In 1992 Danish production set a record; Danes harvested 8 million trees and exported 75% of those. Denmark was Europe's leading exporter of natural Christmas trees in 1999. For instance, in 1999 Denmark produced between 6–7 million Christmas trees annually, of that number between 500,000–700,000 were consumed domestically. The rest were exported to the rest of Europe with Germany importing 60–70 percent of those trees. Between 1999 and 2007 the number of Danes growing Christmas trees remained steady at around 4,000. However, between those same years the number of trees grown and the total value of trees produced increased. By 2007 Denmark harvested between 10 and 12 million Christmas trees.

Planting lulls in 2004 in Denmark, along with Great Britain and Ireland, were blamed for a European shortage of tall Christmas trees in 2011. The year of the planting lull Christmas tree farmers in Denmark and Ireland lost European Union agriculture subsidies. The result was that in 2011 there were 3-5 million fewer tall Christmas trees (7–10 feet) available in Europe. Fewer plantings during the years 1998-2004 were also blamed in a 2007 shortage that proved to involve price fixing as well.

Tree numbers in Denmark hit a peak in 2003-2004 when 14 million Danish Christmas trees were exported. After the EU suspended agriculture subsidies for Danish Christmas tree farmers the Danish Christmas Tree Growers Association (DCTGA) stated that around 600 farmers had quit between 2005 and 2007. In 2005 Denmark was Europe's leading producer of Nordmann firs for Christmas trees. That year Denmark produced 8-9 million Nordmanns. Between 1999 and 2007 the estimated value of the total Danish Christmas tree crop increased from 600-700 million kroner to 1.4 billion kroner. By 2008 Danish Christmas tree crops were expected to be around 9 million, about 500,000 trees below 2007 numbers.

== 2007 price fixing scandal ==
In 2007 there was a sharp decline in Danish tree production. Production fell from 12 million to 8 million, reducing export numbers drastically. The United Kingdom, a nation which normally imported about 1.5 million Christmas trees from Denmark, imported 500,000 trees from Denmark. Initially, the shortfall and the resulting price increase, which most specifically affected the Nordmann fir, was blamed on a crisis within the industry from 1998–2004. During that time growers planted far fewer trees after overproduction had driven many Christmas tree farmers out of business.

On December 17, 2007, the Danish Christmas Tree Growers Association (DCTGA) was charged with price fixing by the state prosecutor for serious economic crimes. The association was accused of sending price guidelines to its members suggesting a price increase of 10 to 25 percent. In 2007, prices eventually rose 25 percent for Nordmann firs, the most popular variety in Denmark and most of Europe. Charges were handed down after the Danish Competition Authority warned the DCTGA in 2001 and 2005 about the same practices. Both the association itself and the association's director at the time Kaj Østergaard were charged in the case. Initially, Østergaard denied the charges and stated: "This is an old case. They contacted us a year ago to say we set the prices and that is not true. We are confident we will beat back the charges.

On September 24, 2009, the Eastern High Court handed down a judgement in the price fixing case. The Danish Christmas Tree Growers Association was fined. The court ruled that the DCGTA had published price statistics and a price calculation model, as well as other tools which were used to guide member pricing, including minimum prices. The Eastern High Court's original fines took into account the repeated warning the association had been given. The Danish Supreme Court eventually reviewed the case and imposed even stiffer fines than the Eastern High Court had. The Supreme Court fined the DCTGA 500,000 kroner and increased the fines against members of the executive committee from 15,000 kroner to 25,000 kroner.

The DCTGA was found to be in serious violation of the Danish Competition Act due to price fixing. Though the fines imposed were increased by the Supreme Court, they were still on the lower end of the spectrum for fines involving crimes of this nature. Both the association and its "manager" were convicted in the case. With the allegations and conviction the DCTGA has been repeatedly referred to as a cartel.

== Tree shortages and price changes ==
Christmas tree shortages in Europe, especially Great Britain, have been reported frequently since the late 1990s. Generally speaking, many of these reports cite crop issues in Denmark as part of the reason for the shortages. In addition, large price increases have been reported from year to year.

Between 2005 and 2009 the price of Danish grown Christmas trees increased by 80 percent.

The Western Mail reported a 2006 Christmas tree shortage and resultant price increase in Great Britain. The report blamed changes in agricultural policies in Denmark which the DCTGA director Kaj Østergaard stated caused many Danish tree growers to go out of business. Horticulture Week pinned the Europe-wide Christmas tree shortage on "the loss of EU subsidies (in Denmark) and years of oversupply." The report predicted a 30 percent drop in Nordmann fir imports from Denmark over 2005.

Three days before charges were filed in the 2007 price fixing case, The New York Times filed a report about the Christmas tree shortage affecting Denmark and Europe. The Times reported the shortage and the 25 percent price increase on Danish grown trees that followed. In the article Claus Jerram Christensen blamed the shortage, in part, on the fact that Eastern Europeans were getting wealthier and "upgrading to the Nordmann". Described as a senior consultant to the DCTGA, Christensen also told The Times, "We expect China will be next." Christensen took over the DCTGA directorship after Østergaard left in 2011.

2008 shortages that led to price increases due to lower tree production in Denmark were reported in media, such as Reuters. A report from that organization cited oversupply between 1998-2004 which caused prices to collapse and many Danish tree farms to quit planting the crop.

A Great Britain specific 2009 shortage of Nordmann fir and Norway spruce imports was blamed on a poor pound to euro exchange rate by Chris Irvine, writing for The Telegraph. Horticulture Week blamed the ongoing British shortages, in 2009, on the end of EU subsidies for growers in Denmark and the poor exchange rate between the euro and pound.

In 2010 another European tree shortage was reported. A report in The Independent attributed it to harsh European winters. From the British perspective it meant 800,000 fewer imported Nordmann fir from Denmark and Norway. The 2010 shortage led to a 25 percent price increase, according to one source which attributed the shortage to "demand outstripping supply" due to a low number of plantings in 2004.

A 2011 shortage of "tall" trees in Great Britain led The Guardian to report that the shortage, of 40,000 to 50,000 trees, was due to a drop in the number of plantings in 2004. The drop resulted when the EU ended subsidies to Denmark's Christmas tree farmers, as reported by The Guardian. Despite seeing one fifth the number of imports from Denmark and Norway in 2011, the shortage did not affect the whole country the same way. In Worcestershire local media reported that while prices had increased supply seemed to be a non-issue in the area.
