= Aluminium price-fixing conspiracy =

2010-2013 conspiracy between several companies to limit aluminium supply

The aluminium price-fixing conspiracy was an effort by Goldman Sachs, JPMorgan Chase, Glencore and their warehouse companies to inflate the price of aluminium by creating artificial supply shortages at their warehouses between 2010 and 2013.

Although it was described by others as just a conspiracy theory, in a July 2013 article, David Kocieniewski, a journalist with The New York Times, accused Goldman Sachs and other Wall Street firms of "capitalizing on loosened federal regulations" to manipulate "a variety of commodities markets", particularly aluminum, citing "financial records, regulatory documents, and interviews with people involved in the activities". After Goldman Sachs purchased aluminum warehousing company Metro International in 2010, the wait of warehouse customers for delivery of aluminum supplies to their factories – to make beer cans, home siding, and other products – went from an average of 6 weeks to more than 16 months. The premium on all aluminum sold in the spot market doubled, with industry analysts blaming the lengthy delays at Metro International, costing American consumers more than $5 billion from 2010 to 2013. Goldman's ownership of a quarter of the national supply of aluminum – a million and a half tons – in a network of 27 Metro International warehouses in Detroit, Michigan, was blamed. To avoid hoarding and price manipulation, the London Metal Exchange requires that "at least 3,000 tons of that metal must be moved out each day". According to the article, Goldman dealt with this requirement by moving the aluminum – not to factories, but "from one warehouse to another".

In August 2013, Goldman Sachs was subpoenaed by the federal Commodity Futures Trading Commission as part of an investigation into complaints that Goldman-owned metals warehouses had "intentionally created delays and inflated the price of aluminum".

According to Lydia DePillis of Wonkblog, when Goldman bought the warehouses it "started paying traders extra to bring their metal" to Goldman's warehouses "rather than anywhere else. The longer it stays, the more rent Goldman can charge, which is then passed on to the buyer in the form of a premium." The effect is "amplified" by another company, Glencore, which is "doing the same thing in its warehouse in Vlissingen".

Columnist Matt Levine, writing for Bloomberg News, described the conspiracy theory as "pretty silly", but said that it was a rational outcome of an irrational and inefficient system which Goldman Sachs may not have properly understood.

In December 2014, Goldman Sachs sold its aluminum warehousing business to Ruben Brothers.

In March 2015, the legal case against Goldman Sachs, JPMorgan Chase, Glencore, the two investment banks' warehousing businesses, and the London Metal Exchange in various combinations – of violating U.S. anti-trust laws, was dismissed by United States District Court for the Southern District of New York Judge Katherine B. Forrest in Manhattan for lack of evidence and other reasons. The lawsuit was revived in 2019 after the 2nd U.S. Circuit Court of Appeals in Manhattan said the previous decision was in error. That case was dismissed by judge Paul A. Engelmayer in 2021 although Reynolds Consumer Products and two other plaintiffs that had directly transacted with the defendants were allowed to pursue the case. Those purchasers settled with Goldman and JPMorgan Chase in 2022.

== See also ==
- Lysine price-fixing conspiracy
