= Danish Christmas Tree Growers Association =

Danish trade association

The Danish Christmas Tree Association is a trade association in Denmark which represents the growers of natural Christmas trees.

== 2007 price fixing scandal ==
On December 17, 2007 the Danish Christmas Tree Growers Association was charged with price fixing by the state prosecutor for serious economic crimes. The association was accused of sending price guidelines to its members suggesting a price increase of 10 to 25 percent. In 2007, prices eventually rose 25 percent for Nordmann firs, the most popular variety in Denmark and most of Europe. Charges were handed down after the Danish Competition Authority warned the DCTGA in 2001 and 2005 about the same practices. Both the association itself and the association's director at the time Kaj Østergaard were charged in the case.

On September 24, 2009, the Eastern High Court handed down a judgement in the price fixing case. The Danish Christmas Tree Growers Association was fined. The court ruled that the DCGTA had published price statistics and a price calculation model, as well as other tools which were used to guide member pricing, including minimum prices. The Eastern High Court's original fines took into account the repeated warning the association had been given. The Danish Supreme Court eventually reviewed the case and imposed even stiffer fines that the Eastern High Court had. The Supreme Court fined the DCTGA 500,000 kroner and increased the fines against members of the executive committee from 15,000 kroner to 25,000 kroner. Both the association and its "manager" were convicted in the case. With the allegations and conviction the DCTGA has been repeatedly referred to as a cartel.

== Leadership ==
- Association "Managers" (often referred to as "director")
  - 1984-1985: Esben Møller-Madsen
  - 1985-1993: Kaj Østergaard
  - 1993-1995: Asger Olsen
  - 1995-1996: Jøns Dalum
  - 1996-1998: Jens Søgaard Jacobsen
  - 1999-2011: Kaj Østergaard
  - 2011-present: Claus Jerram Christensen
