= The Informant (book) =

2000 nonfiction book by Kurt Eichenwald

The Informant: A True Story
- Author: Kurt Eichenwald
- Language: English
- Subject: Lysine price-fixing conspiracy
- Publisher: Random House (hardback); Broadway Books (paperbacks)
- Publication date: 2000
- Publication place: United States
- Media type: Print (Hardback & Paperback)
- Pages: 624 (hardback); 656 (trade paperback and movie tie-in edition)
- ISBN: 978-0-7679-0326-4
- OCLC: 44045679
- Dewey Decimal: 364.16/8/0973 1
- LC Class: HV8144.F43 E53 2000

The Informant: A True Story is a nonfiction white-collar crime book written by journalist Kurt Eichenwald and published in 2000 by Random House. It documents the mid-1990s lysine price-fixing conspiracy case and the involvement of Archer Daniels Midland executive Mark Whitacre, inspiring a 2009 film adaptation starring Matt Damon as Whitacre.

== Summary ==
External videos
- Part One of Booknotes interview with Kurt Eichenwald on The Informant, February 4, 2001, C-SPAN
- Part Two of Booknotes interview, February 11, 2001, C-SPAN

In the early 1990s, at the agri-business conglomerate Archer Daniels Midland (ADM), Mark Whitacre is a corporate vice president and head of the bio-products division. In November 1992, under pressure from his wife, Whitacre confesses to an FBI agent that he, along with other ADM executives, routinely met with competitors to fix the price of lysine, a food additive. Afterwards, Whitacre assists in gathering evidence against the other conspirators by secretly taping their activities during overseas business meetings. Over the course of three years, the FBI collects hundreds of hours of video and audio tapes documenting the largest case of price-fixing in history.

Whitacre is revealed to have defrauded $9 million from ADM at the same time he was aiding the FBI. After federal agents stage a raid on ADM, the company hits back with damning evidence against the government's star witness. Whitacre becomes delusional and engages in pathological lying to save himself, leading the FBI to learn that he has bipolar disorder. Worst of all, he gives false stories to the media about being forced to destroy evidence by the FBI. Whitacre becomes extremely manic, stops sleeping, and exhibits bizarre behavior as his meltdown continues. He attempts suicide a few months later, but is saved by his groundskeeper.

After seeing the movie The Firm, Whitacre's delusional fantasy causes him to record and collect his conversations with FBI agents. Because he violated his immunity agreement with the government, Whitacre is charged with price-fixing along with the other ADM conspirators. Whitacre's attorney, James Epstein, successfully convinces the Justice Department officials that the government was culpable for Whitacre's behavior as he was emotionally unprepared for the case. Epstein manages to get a very light sentence for Whitacre. However, Whitacre, unwilling to serve any jail time, fires Epstein.

At his trial, Whitacre is convicted and receives a federal prison sentence three times longer than the other conspirators. Whitacre's FBI handlers, along with Attorney General John Ashcroft, attempt to obtain a presidential pardon for Whitacre. With remarkable support from the FBI and his wife, Whitacre recovers from his mental problems and, after leaving prison, is promoted to COO and president of a California biotechnology company. The guilty parties in the price-fixing conspiracy, including ADM, pay hundreds of millions of dollars in settlements and fines, while several ADM executives serve prison time.

== Film adaptation ==
The book was used as the basis for the movie The Informant!, directed by Steven Soderbergh and starring Matt Damon as Mark Whitacre.
