= Icelandic oil price fixing scandal =

The Icelandic oil price fixing scandal was an illegal price fixing scheme among oil companies in Iceland. Three oil companies: Olís, Skeljungur (which operates Orkan), and Ker hf. (which operated Essó), engaged in price fixing that began no later than March 1993 and continued until the end of the period covered by the investigation by Samkeppnisstofnun, in December 2001. Samkeppnisstofnun heavily fined the four companies on 28 October 2004; all of them appealed the fine.

Numerous legal entities filed lawsuits against the oil companies with the aim of obtaining damages. In February 2008, the oil companies were ordered to pay the City of Reykjavík 73 million ISK in damages, in May 2010 to pay the Municipality of Vestmannaeyjar 14 million ISK, and in June 2011, it was reported that the oil companies had paid Stodir 110 million ISK in damages and the American company Alcoa, which operates the Straumsvík aluminium smelter, somewhat lower compensation. However, Ker hf. sued the Icelandic state (and the competition authorities) as it believed it had not been proven that it had any financial gain from the collusion. In January 2012, the Icelandic state sued the oil companies and demanded damages amounting to 25 million ISK.

Gísli Tryggvason, the Consumer Spokesperson, stated in September 2010 that high margins on petrol were a sign that there was still little competition in the oil market. The Analysis Department of Arion Bank concluded that from 2008 to 2010, the margin of the oil companies per liter of petrol decreased from 60 ISK to about 45 ISK. However, the state's margin greatly increased. It has been suggested, due to public statements by Hermann Guðmundsson, CEO of N1, that competition was inactive or minimal on the part of N1 immediately after the 2008–2011 Icelandic financial crisis, because the company had an "obligation to respect a certain situation in the market, i.e., that the companies were in different positions".
