= Mark Whitacre =

American businessperson and money launderer

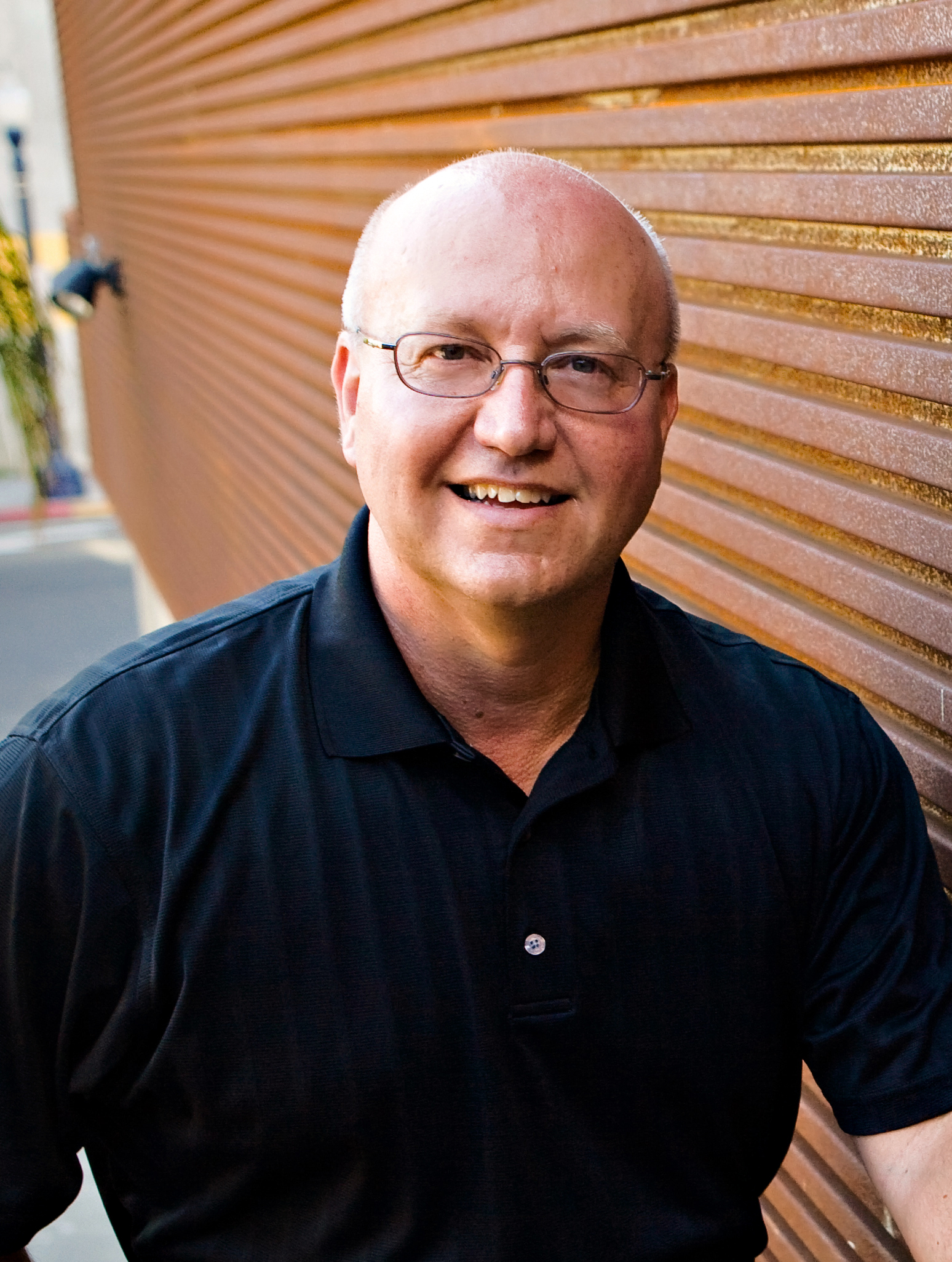
- Whitacre in 2008
- Born: May 1, 1957 (age 69); Morrow, Ohio, U.S.
- Education: Ohio State University (BS, MS); Cornell University (PhD)
- Occupations: Chief Science Officer of Cypress Systems, Inc.
- Spouse: Ginger Whitacre (m. 1979)
- Children: Three
- Status: Released December 21, 2006
- Criminal charges: Wire fraud, tax fraud, money laundering, price-fixing
- Penalty: 9 years in federal prison camp (but served ca. 8 1/2 yrs. for good behavior)
- Scientific career
- Fields: Nutritional Biochemistry
- Thesis: PhD Studies of the role of selenium in maintaining the integrity of the exocrine pancreas of the chick (1983)

Mark Edward Whitacre (born May 1, 1957) is an American business executive who came to public attention in 1995 when, as president of the Decatur, Illinois-based BioProducts Division at Archer Daniels Midland (ADM), he became the highest-level corporate executive in U.S. history to become a Federal Bureau of Investigation (FBI) whistleblower. For three years (1992–95), Whitacre acted as a cooperating witness for the FBI, which was investigating ADM for price fixing. In the late 1990s, Whitacre was sentenced to nine years in federal prison for embezzling $9.5 million from ADM at the same time he was assisting the federal price-fixing investigation.

ADM investigated Whitacre's activities and, upon discovering suspicious activity, requested the FBI investigate Whitacre for embezzlement. As a result of $9.5 million in various frauds, Whitacre lost his whistleblower's immunity, and consequently spent eight and a half years in federal prison. He was released in December 2006. Whitacre is currently the chief science officer and President of Operations at Cypress Systems, a California biotechnology firm.

== Early life and education ==
Whitacre holds B.S. and M.S. degrees from Ohio State University, and earned a PhD in nutritional biochemistry from Cornell University (1983).

Per Whitacre’s official website, while he was in prison from 1998 to 2006, he received more graduate degrees via correspondence. For example, he received a Juris Doctor and a Master of Laws from an online State Bar of California accredited Northwestern California University School of Law. In addition, Whitacre also received in prison via correspondence another Juris Doctor, a Master of Business Administration, a PhD in psychology, and a PhD in economics from Kensington University, an unaccredited distance education institution closed in 2003.

== Career ==
Whitacre was a PhD scientist at Ralston Purina after he graduated from Cornell University in early 1983. He then was Vice President at Evonik from 1984 to 1989 prior to joining ADM. In late 1989, Whitacre became the President of the BioProducts Division at ADM. In 1992, he was promoted to Corporate Vice President of ADM, as well as being President of the BioProducts Division. On August 9, 1995, Whitacre was terminated for conducting a $9.5 million fraud after ADM learned that he was an FBI informant for three years. Whitacre wore a wire for the FBI assisting in one of the largest price fixing cases in U.S. history, against ADM.

After leaving ADM in August 1995, Whitacre was hired as the CEO of Future Health Technologies (FHT), which soon was renamed Biomar International. He worked at Biomar until his incarceration began during early 1998.

In December 2006, after his release from federal prison, Whitacre was hired by Cypress Systems Inc., a California biotechnology company, as the President of Technology and Business Development. In March 2008, Whitacre was promoted to the company's Chief Operating Officer (COO) and President of operations.

== Legal issues ==
=== ADM price-fixing ===
In 1992, during an ADM-initiated investigation of corporate espionage and sabotage, Whitacre informed an FBI agent that he and other ADM executives were involved in an illegal multinational lysine price-fixing scheme. Whitacre's wife pressured him into becoming a whistleblower after she threatened to go to the FBI herself.

Over the next three years, Whitacre worked with FBI agents to collect information and record conversations with both ADM executives and its competitors. ADM ultimately settled federal charges for more than $100 million and paid hundreds of millions of dollars more to plaintiffs and customers ($400 million alone on a high-fructose corn syrup class action case).

=== Whitacre embezzlement ===
A few years into the price-fixing investigation, Whitacre confessed to his FBI handlers that he had been involved with corporate kickbacks and money laundering at ADM. Whitacre was later convicted of embezzling $9 million; some of this criminal activity occurred during the time he was cooperating with the FBI.

=== Sentencing and release ===
Whitacre pled guilty to tax evasion and fraud and was sent to prison on March 4, 1998. Although some officials in the FBI and the Department of Justice opposed the length of the penalty, Whitacre was sentenced to nine years in Federal prison. In December 2006, he was released on good behavior after serving eight and a half years.

=== Differing perspectives ===
==== Kurt Eichenwald ====
External videos
- Part One of Booknotes interview with Kurt Eichenwald on The Informant, February 4, 2001, C-SPAN
- Part Two of Booknotes interview, February 11, 2001, C-SPAN

In his 2000 book, The Informant, Kurt Eichenwald, a former The New York Times reporter, portrays Whitacre as a complex figure: while working for the FBI as one of the best and most effective undercover cooperating witnesses the U.S. government ever had, Whitacre was simultaneously committing a $9 million white-collar crime. According to Eichenwald, preceding the investigation Whitacre was scammed by a group in Nigeria in an advance fee fraud, and suggests that Whitacre's losses in the scam may have been the initial reason behind his embezzlement activity at ADM.

Eichenwald writes that Whitacre lied and became delusional in a failed attempt to save himself, making the FBI investigation much more difficult. The Informant details Whitacre's bizarre behavior, including Whitacre cracking under pressure, increasing his mania, telling the media that FBI agents tried to force him to destroy tapes (a story that Whitacre later recanted), and attempting suicide. Two doctors later diagnosed Whitacre as suffering from bipolar disorder. Eichenwald concludes that Whitacre's sentence was unjust because of his mental instability at the time.

Eichenwald, two prosecutors, an FBI agent, and Mark Whitacre (during his incarceration) were featured on a September 15, 2000, episode of the radio program This American Life about the ADM case. Eichenwald referred to Whitacre's sentence as "excessive and a law enforcement failure" because Whitacre never received credit for his substantial cooperation in assisting the government with the massive price-fixing case.

==== Feature film ====
The Informant! is a Warner Bros. feature film released on September 18, 2009. Produced by Jennifer Fox and directed by Steven Soderbergh, the dark comedy/drama film stars Matt Damon as Whitacre. The screenplay by Scott Z. Burns is based on Kurt Eichenwald's book, The Informant, with most of the filming done in Central Illinois (Blue Mound, Springfield, Moweaqua and Decatur). In the movie, the character of Whitacre is portrayed as exhibiting bizarre behavior, including delusions, mania, and compulsively lying. It was eventually learned that Whitacre was suffering from bipolar disorder.

==== James B. Lieber ====
In his 2000 book, Rats In The Grain, attorney James B. Lieber focuses on ADM's price-fixing trial and presents Whitacre as an American hero overpowered by ADM's vast political clout. Rats In The Grain presents evidence that the U.S. Department of Justice often subjugated itself to ADM's political power and well-connected attorneys in prosecuting Whitacre.

Lieber reveals that, in 1996, "ADM CEO, Mr. Dwayne Andreas, told The Washington Post that he had known about Whitacre's frauds for three years" and speculates that Whitacre was fired and turned over to the Federal authorities only after ADM learned he had been working as an FBI mole. If he knew about Whitacre's embezzlement for three years, Lieber asks, why didn't Andreas fire Whitacre immediately? Lieber surmises: "There were only two logical explanations for Andreas' behavior: either he did not think the funds were stolen (in other words, they were approved) or he didn't care."

Based on the fact that other ADM executives committed crimes such as financial fraud by a former treasurer and technology thefts by others, Lieber concludes that fraud was well-known and widespread at ADM during the 1990s. Lieber suggests that ADM would have not turned Whitacre over to the authorities if he had not been a mole for the FBI.

Like Eichenwald, Lieber concludes that Whitacre's lengthy prison sentence was excessive and unjust when one takes into account Whitacre's cooperation in the much larger price-fixing case.

Lieber also poses this question: "Where will the government obtain the next Mark Whitacre after potential whistleblowers observe how Whitacre was treated?"

=== Clemency and pardon support ===
Appeals for Whitacre's full pardon or clemency to the White House were supported by several current and former justice department officials: Dean Paisley, a retired 25-year veteran and former FBI supervisor on the price-fixing case; two other FBI agents involved with the case; a former Attorney General of the United States; one of the former Asst. U.S. Attorneys who prosecuted Whitacre; two prosecutors from the Canadian Department of Justice; several Senators and Congressmen; Cornell University and Ohio State University professors; Major League Baseball Hall of Famer Harmon Killebrew; Chuck Colson; and numerous top executives of corporations.

In 2008, more than ten years after the original conviction, Paisley and two other FBI agents went public with praise for Whitacre. Paisley concluded that "Whitacre's fraud case was minuscule as compared to the ADM case Whitacre cooperated with." "Had it not been for the fraud conviction," Paisley said, "he would be a national hero. Well, he is a national hero." Paisley added, "Without him, the biggest antitrust case we've ever had would not have been." On August 4, 2010, in a Discovery Channel documentary, Undercover: Operation Harvest King, several FBI agents stated that "Whitacre got a raw deal." In addition, official letters from the FBI in support of a Whitacre pardon were published in Floyd Perry's September 2009 book, Mark Whitacre: Against All Odds.

=== Discovery Channel TV documentary ===
A Discovery Channel TV documentary titled Undercover: Operation Harvest King, which documents Mark Whitacre's role in the ADM price fixing case, aired several times during 2009 and 2010. Discovery Channel interviewed the three FBI agents who handled the Mark Whitacre/ADM case (i.e., Dean Paisley, Brian Shepard and Robert Herndon), along with Mark and Ginger Whitacre.

== Personal life ==
Whitacre married his high school sweetheart, Ginger Gilbert, on June 16, 1979. Together they have three children.

Whitacre became a Christian during his incarceration, and since his prison release during December 2006, he has been often interviewed by the Christian community-including the Christian Broadcasting Network (CBN)-about redemption, second chances, and the importance of his faith. Forbes reported that Whitacre was guest speaker at the Quantico FBI Academy during 2011 about second chances, and he was keynote speaker for the 40th Annual NAPSA (Pre Trial Services and U.S. Federal Probation) Conference in 2012 along with Robert F. Kennedy Jr.
