= Groupe Vendôme SA =

Groupe Vendome SA
- Company type: Private S.A.
- Industry: Personal care
- Predecessor: Laboratoire Monot
- Founded: 2002
- Fate: 2011 (merged with Johnson & Johnson Santé Beauté France SAS)
- Successor: Johnson & Johnson
- Headquarters: Rue François Appert, Nuits-Saint-Georges, Dijon, France
- Key people: Marcel Elias
- Products: Cosmetics and beauty products
- Brands: Le Petit Marseillais, fr: Laboratories Vendome, Prim'Age, Persavon, Parfumerie Bernard
- Revenue: €153 million (2005)
- Number of employees: 130
- Website: Laboratoires-Vendome.com

The Groupe Vendome SA was a French cosmetics holding company based in Dijon. The company was established in April 2002 as a result of management buyout arranged by the management team with a €33 million investment from the private equity fund i3.

The company operated several cosmetic brands notably Le Petit Marseillais (shower gels, soaps, baths and hair care products), Laboratories Vendome (skin care products for sensitive skin) and Prim'Age (baby toiletries brand).

It was acquired by Johnson & Johnson in 2006 and merged into Johnson & Johnson Santé Beauté France SAS in 2011. Laboratoires Vendome remained as an independent cosmetic brand within the new company.

== History ==
=== Origins (1919–1980) ===
The history of Groupe Vendôme SA began in 1919, when Lucien Monot founded the pharmaceutical company Laboratoire Monot in Dijon. In 1946, his son Pierre Monot inherited the business.

In 1967, Marcel Elias joined the company as an accountant at the age of 24. He became general manager and chairman of the board in 1972.

Gérard Monot headed the company beginning in 1976.

In 1981, the company began building a national distribution network and entered the cosmetics and personal care market.

=== Creation of Laboratoires Vendôme and brand expansion (1984–1995) ===
In 1984, the company created "Laboratoires Vendôme" as both a corporate entity and a personal care brand.

That same year, Laboratoires Vendôme acquired the "Le Petit Marseillais" brand.

In 1985, "Le Petit Marseillais" was launched in supermarkets with three types of soap: green, natural white and rose.

=== Restructuring and management buyout (1996–2005) ===
In 1996, the Monot family sold the pharmaceutical business to Germany's Merck KGaA.

In 1998, the cosmetics business was split into two brands: "Le Petit Marseillais" and "Laboratoires Vendôme", with product lines such as "Prim'Age Bébé", "Classic" and "Dermatologic".

In 2002, Marcel Elias arranged a management buyout of "Laboratoires Vendôme", and Groupe Vendôme SA became a holding company managing several brands including "Laboratoires Vendôme". By that year, turnover in personal care products reached €121 million.

=== Acquisition by Johnson & Johnson (2006–2007) ===
In 2006, Groupe Vendôme SA was acquired by Johnson & Johnson.

Marcel Elias left the company in 2007.

=== Integration and legal issues (2011–2016) ===
In 2011, Groupe Vendôme SA was merged into Johnson & Johnson Santé Beauté France SAS, while "Laboratoires Vendôme" continued as a brand name.

In 2016, Groupe Vendôme SA was fined by the Autorité de la concurrence for price-fixing on personal hygiene products.

== Brands ==
=== Le Petit Marseillais ===
"Le Petit Marseillais" ("Little Boy from Marseille") is the company’s largest brand, accounting for roughly 70 percent of total sales. The brand was established in 1981 by Bernard Lengellé, a former journalist of the "Dauphiné Libéré" newspaper, who revived an old recipe for the well-known Marseilles soap, probably dating back to 1921, and began selling it to pharmacies in Vaucluse. The brand name was most likely derived from the popular newspaper "Le Petit Marseillais", which ceased to exist in 1944.

In 1984 "Le Petit Marseillais" was acquired by Laboratoires Vendôme for 100.000 or 200.000 francs, estimated at around €15 000. The new owners expanded the business and relaunched the brand in supermarkets in 1985. By 1986 the brand had become popular due to its natural-ingredient narrative and its claimed Provence origin, reaching a 6 percent share of the French soap market.

Further diversification followed: shower gels were introduced in 1989, and liquid soaps entered the market in 1992. By 1998 the range included shower gels, bubble baths, liquid soaps and children’s products.

In 2003 the company launched shampoos emphasising "the authenticity and naturalness, inspired by the Mediterranean origin", and the brand’s share of the shampoo market grew to 4.1 percent by the end of the year. Stéphanie Perrouty describes the communication "formula" of the brand as typically involving "a moment of pleasure and care" along with flavour-related descriptors such as "delicate fruit notes", "delicate fresh notes", "intense accents for gourmet", and "gourmet fruit notes". The brand promotes naturalness, a Provence identity, and unique fragrance combinations, including apple and kiwi, peach and apricot, and cherry and almond.

=== Other brands ===
In spring 2005 the company expanded its portfolio by acquiring the cosmetic brands "Persavon", "La Perdrix" and "Parfumerie Bernard" from fr: Savonnerie et parfumerie Bernard.
