= The Informant! =

2009 film by Steven Soderbergh

- Theatrical release poster
- Directed by: Steven Soderbergh
- Screenplay by: Scott Z. Burns
- Based on: The Informant by Kurt Eichenwald
- Produced by: Gregory Jacobs; Jennifer Fox; Michael Jaffe; Howard Braunstein; Kurt Eichenwald
- Starring: Matt Damon; Scott Bakula; Joel McHale; Melanie Lynskey
- Cinematography: Peter Andrews
- Edited by: Stephen Mirrione
- Music by: Marvin Hamlisch
- Production companies: Participant Media; Groundswell Productions; Section Eight Productions; Jaffe-Braunstein Films
- Distributed by: Warner Bros. Pictures
- Release date: September 18, 2009
- Running time: 108 minutes
- Country: United States
- Language: English
- Budget: $22 million
- Box office: $41.8 million

The Informant! is a 2009 American biographical black comedy film directed by Steven Soderbergh. Written by Scott Z. Burns, the film stars Matt Damon as the informant named Mark Whitacre, as well as Scott Bakula, Joel McHale and Melanie Lynskey. The film depicts Whitacre's involvement as a whistleblower in the lysine price-fixing conspiracy of the mid-1990s, and his embezzlement of millions of dollars from his employer. The film is based on the 2000 nonfiction book The Informant, by journalist Kurt Eichenwald.

Released on September 18, 2009 by Warner Bros. Pictures, The Informant! received generally positive reviews from critics and grossed $41.8 million against a $22 million budget.

== Plot ==
Mark Whitacre, a rising star at the Archer Daniels Midland (ADM) office in Decatur, Illinois, during the early 1990s, blows the whistle on the company's price-fixing tactics at the urging of his wife Ginger.

One night in November 1992, Whitacre confesses to FBI special agent Brian Shepard that ADM executives—including Whitacre himself—had routinely met with competitors to fix the price of lysine, an additive used in the commercial livestock industry. Whitacre secretly gathers hundreds of hours of video and audio over several years to present to the FBI.

Whitacre assists in gathering evidence by clandestinely taping the company's activity in business meetings at various locations around the globe. These include locations in Tokyo, Paris, Mexico City, and Hong Kong. He eventually collects enough evidence of collaboration and conspiracy to warrant a raid of ADM.

Whitacre's good deed dovetails with his own major infractions, while his internal, secret struggle with bipolar disorder seems to take over his exploits. Whitacre's meltdown results from the pressures of wearing a wire and organizing surveillance for the FBI for three years, instigated by Whitacre's reaction, in increasingly manic overlays, to various trivial magazine articles he reads.

In a stunning turn of events immediately following the covert portion of the case, headlines worldwide report Whitacre had embezzled $9 million from his own company. This happened simultaneously while he was covertly working with the FBI and taping his co-workers. Whitacre also aims to be elected as ADM CEO following the arrest and conviction of the remaining upper management members. In the ensuing chaos, Whitacre appears to shift his trust and randomly destabilize his relationships with Special Agents Shepard and Herndon and numerous attorneys in the process.

Authorities at ADM begin investigating the forged papertrail Whitacre had built to cover his own deeds. After being confronted with evidence of his fraud, Whitacre's defensive claims begin to spiral out of control, including an accusation of assault and battery against Agent Shepard and the FBI, which had made a substantial move to distance their case from Whitacre entirely. Due to this major infraction and Whitacre's bizarre behavior, he is sentenced to a prison term three times as long as that meted out to the white-collar criminals he helped to catch.

In the epilogue, Agent Herndon visits Whitacre in prison as he videotapes a futile appeal to seek a presidential pardon. Overweight, balding and psychologically beaten after his years long ordeal, Whitacre is eventually released from prison, with Ginger awaiting to greet him.

== Cast ==
- Matt Damon as Mark Whitacre, ADM executive
- Scott Bakula as FBI Special Agent Brian Shepard
- Joel McHale as FBI Special Agent Robert Herndon
- Melanie Lynskey as Ginger Whitacre
- Ann Cusack as Robin Mann
- Ann Dowd as FBI Special Agent Kate Medford
- Thomas F. Wilson as Mark Cheviron
- Tom Papa as Mick Andreas
- Rick Overton as Terry Wilson
- Allan Havey as FBI Supervisor Dean Paisley
- Patton Oswalt as Ed Herbst
- Craig Ricci Shaynak as Discouraged Foreman
- Scott Adsit as Sid Hulse
- Eddie Jemison as Kirk Schmidt
- Clancy Brown as Aubrey Daniel, ADM attorney
- Arden Myrin as Sarah Scott
- Tony Hale as James Epstein, Whitacre's attorney
- Andy Daly as Marty Allison, ADM vice-president
- Frank Welker as Mr. Whitacre
- Candy Clark as Mrs. Whitacre
- Dick Smothers as Judge Harold Baker
- Tom Smothers as Dwayne Andreas
- Richard Steven Horvitz as Bob Zaiderman
- Bob Zany as John Dowd, attorney
- Paul F. Tompkins as FBI Agent Anthony D'Angelo
- Lucas McHugh Carroll as Alexander Whitacre

== Production ==
In 2002, after completing Ocean's Eleven, Steven Soderbergh announced his intent to adapt the book The Informant by Kurt Eichenwald, a former journalist for The New York Times. Scott Z. Burns wrote the script based on the book.

Production began in May 2008 in Decatur, Illinois. Filming was also done at the former Whitacre mansion in Moweaqua, Illinois, a small town about 25 miles from Decatur, and at Illini Country Club in Springfield, Illinois. Some exterior shots were done in Mesa, Arizona, in November 2008. Other portions of the film were shot in the Coachella Valley, California. The film was released on September 18, 2009. Matt Damon gained 20–30 pounds for the role in order to look more like Whitacre.

== Release ==
The film was released on September 18, 2009, in the United States.

== Reception ==
=== Box office ===
The film opened at #2 behind Cloudy with a Chance of Meatballs with $10,545,000. As of December 17, 2009, the film had grossed $33,316,821 domestically and $41,771,168 worldwide.

In the United Kingdom, the film opened at #10 with £179,612 from the opening weekend. It was the third highest new entry after A Serious Man and The Twilight Saga: New Moon.

=== Critical response ===
Rotten Tomatoes reported an 80% approval rating, based on 230 reviews with an average score of 6.8/10. The site's critics consensus states: "A charismatic turn by star Matt Damon and a consistently ironic tone boost this quietly funny satire about a corporate whistle-blower." On Metacritic, it has a weighted average score of 66 out of 100 based on reviews from 37 critics, indicating "generally favorable reviews". Audiences polled by CinemaScore gave the film an average grade of "C−" on an A+ to F scale.

Roger Ebert awarded the film four out of four stars, claiming "The Informant! is fascinating in the way it reveals two levels of events, not always visible to each other or to the audience."

While giving the film the grade of a B, Entertainment Weekly noted that "Soderbergh has chosen to apply an attitude of arch whoopee, a greasy veneer of mirth over what is, no joke, a serious mess of malfeasance and mental instability," concluding, "Soderbergh ultimately made the choice to abandon interesting, dispassionate empathy for the more quick-fix payoff of amusement."

Peter Travers of Rolling Stone gave the film three-and-a-half out of four stars, and, in response to critics of the film's comic tone, commented, "Laugh you will at The Informant!, but it's way too real to laugh off." Leah Rozen of People magazine gave the film three-and-a-half out of four stars, saying, "[Damon]'s a hoot, and so is the movie."

Todd McCarthy of Variety also praised Damon's performance, calling his interpretation of Whitacre, "The wacky little brother of Erin Brockovich" (whose life was also adapted by Soderbergh into a film).

=== Accolades ===
The film received nominations for multiple awards, including a Satellite Award for Best Actor in a Motion Picture – Musical or Comedy for Matt Damon as well as a nomination from the Detroit Film Critics Society. Damon was also nominated for the Golden Globe Award for Best Performance by an Actor in a Motion Picture – Musical or Comedy.

== See also ==
- Lysine price-fixing conspiracy
- Nagra model SNST tape recorder prominent throughout the film
