= Payne Award for Ethics in Journalism =

The Ancil Payne Award for Ethics in Journalism was created at the University of Oregon's School of Journalism and Communication in 1999. The award was created "to honor the journalist of integrity and character who reports with insight and clarity in the face of political or economic pressures and to reward performance that inspires public trust in the media." The award was established by Seattle broadcaster Ancil Payne, former president and CEO of KING-TV. Past award winners have included freelancers, broadcasters and print reporters from media organizations large and small. Award winners receive a $5,000 prize.
