= Olís =

Oil company in Iceland

Olís (Icelandic pronunciation: [ˈɔːliːs]) is the trade name of Iceland Oil Ltd. (Icelandic: Olíuverzlun Íslands hf.), an oil and energy infrastructure company in Iceland. The company operates a number of service stations under the trademark of Olís, in addition to the self-serve stations under the brand name of ÓB - inexpensive fuel.

== History ==
The company was founded on October 3rd, 1927, being the oldest oil company on Iceland. In 1999, Iceland Oil Ltd. The company purchased all shares in Ellingsen, which was soon consolidated into the holding company in 2001. The company also owns all shares in subsidiaries companies Hátækni and ísmar.

Olís was implicated in the 1993–2001 Icelandic oil price fixing scandal.

In June 2011, it was revealed that Landsbankinn, Olís's principal debtor, would be eligible to take over the company due to the company's poor finances. Olís is one of the 30 largest companies in Iceland turnover being ISK 37 billion in 2012. The balance sheet amount to ISK 16.0 billion. The number of employees in 2012 was approximately 420.

In February 2025, the Olís–ÓB app was released.
