= RARIK =

Official energy corporation of Iceland

- Type: Public
- Industry: Energy
- Founded: 1 January 1947
- Founder: Government of Iceland
- Headquarters: Reykjavík, Iceland
- Key people: Ingunn Agnes Kro, chairman Magnús Þór Ásmundsson, CEO
- Products: Electricity distribution Electricity production
- Owner: Government of Iceland
- Number of employees: 252
- Subsidiaries: Orkusalan
- Website: www.rarik.is

RARIK is an energy company in Iceland. It began operations on 1 January 1947. It currently operates electricity distribution networks in rural Iceland, with its subsidiary Orkusalan selling wholesale electricity production from its handful of small hydroelectric plants. It is a state-owned enterprise. It also operates a number of geothermal district heating networks in rural Iceland.

In the early years RARIK built several power plants and in 1954 enacted a 10-year electrification plan to provide remote rural areas with electricity. RARIK built, among others, the Lagarfoss and Mjólká power stations, both of which began operating in 1975. As of 2024, 77% of their network is underground, due to Iceland's harsh weather conditions and aims to be 100% underground by 2035.
