= Kurt Eichenwald =

American journalist

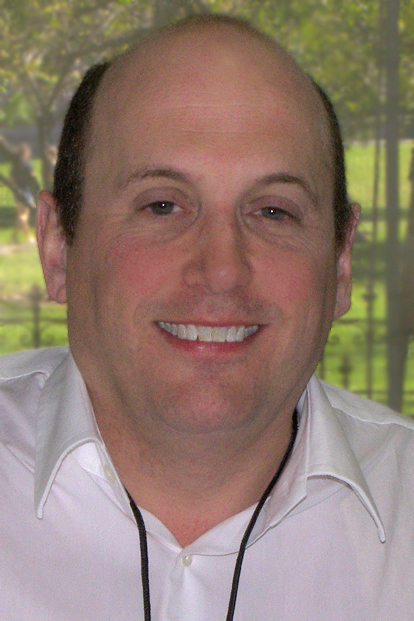
- Eichenwald in 2009
- Born: Kurt Alexander Eichenwald; June 28, 1961 (age 65); New York City, U.S.
- Education: Swarthmore College
- Spouse: Theresa Pearse
- Children: 3
- Writing career
- Notable works: The Informant, Conspiracy of Fools
- Notable awards: George Polk Award; Payne Award for Ethics in Journalism
- Website: KurtEichenwald.com

Kurt Alexander Eichenwald (born June 28, 1961) is an American journalist and a New York Times bestselling author of six books, one of which, The Informant (2000), was made into a motion picture in 2009. He was a senior writer and investigative reporter with The New York Times, Condé Nast's business magazine, Portfolio, and later was a contributing editor with Vanity Fair and a senior writer with Newsweek. Eichenwald had been employed by The New York Times since 1986 and primarily investigated corporate topics such as insider trading, accounting scandals, and takeovers, but also wrote about a range of issues including terrorism, the Bill Clinton pardon controversy, federal health care policy, and sexual predators on the Internet.

== Early life and education ==
Eichenwald was born in 1961. He graduated from St. Mark's School of Texas in Dallas and Swarthmore College. His extracurricular activities during his time at Swarthmore included being a founding member of Sixteen Feet, an a cappella vocal octet. He graduated in 1983, receiving a degree in political science, with distinction.

== Career at The New York Times ==
Following a year at the Election and Survey Unit at CBS News, Eichenwald joined The New York Times in 1985 as a news clerk for Hedrick Smith, the paper's chief Washington correspondent. When Smith began writing his book The Power Game, Eichenwald became his research assistant, leaving in 1986 to become associate editor at The National Journal in Washington. During those years, he was a frequent contributor to The New York Times op-ed page, writing humorous pieces about political issues.

Eichenwald returned to The New York Times later in 1986 as a news clerk for the national desk in New York, participating in the paper's writing program for aspiring reporters.

His arrival on Wall Street coincided with the explosion of white-collar criminal investigations in finance. He wrote about the stock trading scandals involving speculator Ivan Boesky and junk bond king Michael Milken, as well as the Treasury markets scandal at Salomon Brothers. He also covered the excesses of the takeover era, including the biggest deal of the time, the acquisition of RJR Nabisco by Kohlberg Kravis Roberts & Company.

In 1995, Eichenwald began writing about assorted corporate misdeeds. He wrote a multi-part series for The New York Times, exposing significant deficiencies in the American business of providing kidney dialysis treatments. The series led to a review by the Clinton Administration of ways to create financial incentives to improve quality in dialysis treatment, a focus of Eichenwald’s series. The articles were honored in 1996 with a George Polk Award for excellence in journalism, the first of two that he was awarded.

After his dialysis series, he joined with Martin Gottlieb, a health reporter with the newspaper, in a multi-year investigation of Columbia/HCA Healthcare Corporation, which at the time was the largest health-care company in the world.

In 1998, Eichenwald was attached to The New York Times’ senior reporter program. He also teamed with another of the newspaper's reporters, Gina Kolata, for a multi-year investigation into how business interests affect the nation's system for medical research. Eichenwald and Kolata both were honored as finalists for the Pulitzer Prize for their work.

With the explosion of corporate scandals in 2002 – Enron, WorldCom, Arthur Andersen, Tyco and others – Eichenwald reported on the unfolding scandals and becoming a television fixture on such programs as Charlie Rose and The NewsHour with Jim Lehrer in explaining the meaning of the latest developments. Eichenwald, along with several other New York Times reporters, was selected as a finalist for the Pulitzer Prize in 2003 for his work on the corporate scandals.

In 2005, he wrote a group of New York Times articles about online child pornography. One of those articles was about Justin Berry, a then-18-year-old who operated pornographic websites featuring himself and other teen males. For this reporting, Eichenwald received the Payne Award for Ethics in Journalism for "preserving the editorial integrity of an important story while reaching out to assist his source, Justin Berry, in reporting on Berry’s involvement in child pornography."

Five months after publication of the article, Eichenwald and Berry both gave Congressional testimony about online child abuse before a subcommittee of the House Committee on Energy and Commerce. Eichenwald claimed in the testimony that he had stumbled across Berry while reporting on documents that proved to be fraudulent, leaving him believing there was no story but fearful there was a child in danger. "I began trying to figure out if it was real, not for the purpose of doing a story because truthfully I did not, it did not occur to me there would be a story there," Eichenwald testified.

After confirming that Berry was a real person in danger, Eichenwald testified, he along with two others launched an effort to rescue the young man. Weeks after that effort had been completed, during which Eichenwald met Berry, Berry contacted him and said he wanted to reveal everything he knew about the online child pornography business for a news article in hopes of "bringing down" the illicit enterprise.

In 2007 it came to light that Eichenwald had given Berry an undisclosed $2,000 as part of an effort with his wife and minister to track the young man down out of fear for his safety. The New York Times published a note stating that "the check should have been disclosed to editors and readers". During his testimony that same day as a prosecution witness against one of Berry's abusers, Eichenwald said he and his wife had used the money as a means of forcing Berry to reveal his identity during the rescue effort. Eichenwald testified that when Berry offered to become a source for a news article, he told the young man that he could not begin any reporting until the financial conflict was resolved by Berry's returning the money to him from a lawful source of funds. Eichenwald testified that Berry obtained a loan from his grandmother which he used to repay him in July 2005, at which point the reporting began.

== Condé Nast Portfolio ==
In the fall of 2006 Eichenwald left The New York Times and joined the staff of newly created business magazine Condé Nast Portfolio as a senior writer. He was recruited by Jim Impoco, a former New York Times editor and managing editor of the new Portfolio. The first edition of the magazine was published in April 2007. However, both Eichenwald and Impoco had a very short tenure at Portfolio. An Eichenwald article about terrorism that had been championed by Impoco was killed by editor-in-chief Joanne Lipman, leading to a significant dispute between the two editors. After several months of tension between them, Lipman fired Impoco in August 2007; Eichenwald resigned on the same day. Portfolio was not a commercial success, and was closed in April 2009. The failure of such a high-profile project was seen as a major setback for Condé Nast.

== Vanity Fair and Newsweek ==
In 2012, Eichenwald joined Vanity Fair as a contributing editor where he wrote investigative financial articles for the magazine and an online column focusing on government and politics. In 2013, while continuing his work for Vanity Fair he joined Newsweek as a senior writer.

In October 2016, Eichenwald reported that the Russian-funded Sputnik had falsely attributed passages from an article he had written to Hillary Clinton adviser Sidney Blumenthal, a claim Donald Trump repeated at a campaign rally. The Sputnik article had no byline, and Eichenwald did not identify its author. Only afterward did Sputnik editor Bill Moran publicly identify himself as the writer, then sue Newsweek for defamation. Newsweek argued that Eichenwald had neither identified Moran in his original article nor accused him of knowingly publishing false information. Newsweek subsequently agreed to remove the two Eichenwald articles to resolve the case.

In December 2016, Eichenwald was criticized for tweeting a claim that Donald Trump was "institutionalized in a mental hospital" in 1990.

== Books ==
Eichenwald's reporting on Prudential led to his first book, Serpent on the Rock (1995), which focused primarily on the limited partnership scandal at Prudential Securities, which is alleged to have defrauded 340,000 people out of eight billion dollars. The book was positively reviewed by Kirkus reviews, with a comparison to the bestseller Barbarians at the Gate.

External videos
- Part One of Booknotes interview with Kurt Eichenwald on The Informant, February 4, 2001, C-SPAN
- Part Two of Booknotes interview, February 11, 2001, C-SPAN

In 2000, he published his second book, The Informant. The investigative business book focused both on Archer Daniels Midland while also serving non-fiction police procedural depicting the inner workings of the FBI in detail. The book was subsequently adapted as the feature film a film adaptation. The movie, a dark comedy directed by Steven Soderbergh and starring Matt Damon, was released in 2009.

Eichenwald's investigation of Enron led to his third and most successful book, Conspiracy of Fools (2005). The book made The New York Times bestseller list in April 2005. The book was marketed as "a gripping corporate thriller with more plot twists than a John Grisham novel" by Random House. It was optioned as a movie by Warner Brothers, to potentially star Leonardo DiCaprio. However, the film was never made.

In 2012, he published his fourth book, 500 Days. Also a New York Times bestseller, the book chronicled the events in governments around the world in the 500 days after the 9/11 attacks. It revealed details of the American program of NSA eavesdropping, torture policy, the American government's briefings on the coming attacks before 9/11, and the details of debates within the British government.

Eichenwald's fifth book, A Mind Unraveled, was published in 2018 by Random House. The book is a memoir about medical struggles that almost killed Eichenwald when he was a young man.

In 2021, Eichenwald published his sixth book, The Big Lie. The book investigated the British doctor whose lies gave birth to the false claim that vaccines caused autism.

== Awards and recognition ==
Eichenwald is a two-time winner of the George Polk Award for Excellence in Journalism in 1995 and 1997, for his investigation of the most prominent companies in the dialysis industry and fraud at the nation's largest hospital company, Columbia/HCA Healthcare Corporation. He was a finalist for the Pulitzer Prize in 2000, along with his New York Times colleague Gina Kolata, for an investigation of medical clinical trials. In 2006, he won the Payne Award for Ethics in Journalism and the Best in Business Enterprise Award from the Society of American Business Editors and Writers.

== Personal life ==
During his first months of college in 1979, Eichenwald sustained a concussion, which was soon followed by epileptic seizures. Diagnosed with epilepsy in November of his freshman year, he continued to attend school despite repeated grand mal seizures.

After having two outdoor seizures on campus, he was dismissed from Swarthmore, in apparent violation of federal law. He contacted the United States Department of Health and Human Services and fought his way back into school, an experience that he has credited with giving him the willingness to take on institutions in his muckraking reporting.

In a 1987 article about his illness for The New York Times Magazine, Eichenwald wrote about his epilepsy diagnosis at the age of 18 in 1979:

The doctor warned me – and so did members of my family soon afterward – that if I did not keep my epilepsy a secret, people would fear me and I would be subject to discrimination. Even now, seven years after that scene in the dining hall, it is difficult for me to say that I have epilepsy. Back then, it was impossible. In the years since, I have had hundreds of various types of seizures. I have experienced the mental, physical and emotional side effects caused by changes in the anticonvulsant drugs I take each day. Yet, for the first two years, I refused to learn about epilepsy. My fears of being found out were my real concern.

His willingness to reveal his personal battle to readers won him praise. He was awarded a journalism prize from the Epilepsy Foundation of America for his 1987 article. In a 2002 NewsBios article titled "Kurt Succeeded Where So Many Others Would Have Quit," Dean Rotbart wrote:

While Eichenwald has never since hidden his epilepsy, he also didn't make it a centerpiece of his life. After writing his story, his mission was clear and it was not to become a poster boy for the illness. "My whole life from the time I got sick was focused on making sure that I was a student, a journalist, a husband, and a father," Kurt tells me. "Not that I was someone with this condition."

In late 2016, after making critical remarks about Donald Trump, Eichenwald was intentionally sent epileptogenic GIFs over Twitter. In mid-December, Eichenwald participated in an interview regarding Trump with Tucker Carlson. Following that, a second epileptogenic GIF arrived over Twitter, causing Eichenwald to have a seizure. He announced he would be taking a short break from Twitter while he pursued legal action against the sender.

In March 2017, a Maryland man was arrested in connection with the incident and charged with cyberstalking. The federal cyberstalking charge was later dropped, although he still faced one count of aggravated assault, with the tweet being considered "a deadly weapon". The trial of the suspect began on December 16, 2019. In September 2020, Eichenwald won his civil suit, although the criminal trial is still pending.

=== Family ===
Eichenwald is married to Theresa Pearse, an internist. They have three children.

== Bibliography ==
- The Informant: A True Story. Broadway Books. 2000. ISBN 978-0-7679-0326-4.
- Conspiracy of Fools: A True Story. Crown/Archetype. March 14, 2005. ISBN 978-0-7679-1180-1.
- Serpent on the Rock. Crown/Archetype. December 18, 2007. ISBN 978-0-307-41923-1.
- 500 Days: Secrets and Lies in the Terror Wars. Simon and Schuster. September 11, 2012. ISBN 978-1-4516-7413-2.
- A Mind Unraveled: A Memoir. Random House. October 16, 2018. ISBN 978-0-399-59362-8.
