= List of Polish European Film Award winners and nominees =

This is a list of Polish European Film Award winners and nominees. This list details the performances of Polish actors, actresses, and films that have either been submitted or nominated for, or have won, a European Film Award.

== Main categories ==
Year	Award	Recipient	Status	Note
1988	Best Film	A Short Film About Killing directed by Krzysztof Kieślowski	Won	
1988	Best Supporting Actor	Wojciech Pszoniak for Notturno	Nominated	
1989	Best Young Film	300 Miles to Heaven directed by Maciej Dejczer	Won	
1989	Best Director	Maciej Dejczer for 300 Miles to Heaven	Nominated	
1989	Best Composer	Michał Lorenc for 300 Miles to Heaven	Nominated	
1989	Best Cinematographer	Krzysztof Ptak for 300 Miles to Heaven	Nominated	
1989	Best Screenwriter	Maciej Dejczer, Cezary Harasimowicz for 300 Miles to Heaven	Nominated	
1990	Best Film	Interrogation directed by Ryszard Bugajski	Nominated	
1990	Best Actress	Krystyna Janda for Interrogation	Nominated	
1990	Best Screenwriter	Ryszard Bugajski, Janusz Dymek for Interrogation	Nominated	
1991	Best Supporting Actor	Zbigniew Zamachowski for Escape from the 'Liberty' Cinema	Nominated	
1991	Best Documentary	Hear My Cry directed by Maciej Drygas	Won	
1993	Special Mentions	89mm from Europe directed by Marcel Łoziński	Won	
1994	Best Film	The Three Colors: Blue, White, Red directed by Krzysztof Kieślowski	Nominated	French-Polish-Swiss coproduction
1996	Best Documentary	Jerzy Śladkowski, Stanisław Krzemiński	Won	Award given without recognize any particular movie
1997	Best Actor	Jerzy Stuhr for Love Stories	Nominated	
1999	Best Cinematographer	Jacek Petrycki for Journey to the Sun	Nominated	
2000	Best Actor	Krzysztof Siwczyk for Wojaczek	Nominated	
2000	Best Short Film	And I Will Not Leave You Until I Die directed by Maciej Adamek	Nominated	
2001	Discovery of the Year	Happy man directed by Małgorzata Szumowska	Nominated	
2001	Discovery of the Year	Last Resort directed by Paweł Pawlikowski	Nominated	British production directed by Polish-born Polish-British director
2001	Best Short Film	A Man Thing directed by Sławomir Fabicki	Nominated	
2002	Best Film	The Pianist directed by Roman Polanski	Nominated	French-Polish-German-British coproduction
2002	Best Director	Roman Polanski for The Pianist	Nominated	French-born Polish-French director
2002	Best Cinematographer	Paweł Edelman for The Pianist	Won	
2003	Best Short Film	Country of Birth directed by Jacek Bławut	Nominated	
2003	Best Cinematographer	Bogumił Godfrejów for Distant Lights	Nominated	
2005	Best Director	Paweł Pawlikowski for My Summer of Love	Nominated	Polish-born Polish-British director
2005	Best Cinematographer	Ryszard Lenczewski for My Summer of Love	Nominated	
2005	Discovery of the Year	Life in me directed by Małgorzata Szumowska	Nominated	Polish-German coproduction
2005	People’s Choice Awards - Best Actor	Marian Dziędziel for The Wedding	Nominated	
2005	People’s Choice Awards - Best Actress	Agnieszka Grochowska for The Welts	Nominated	
2006	Discovery of the Year	Retrieval directed by Sławomir Fabicki	Nominated	
2007	Best Short Film	Belarusian Waltz directed by Andrzej Fidyk	Nominated	
2008	Prix d'Excellence	Magdalena Biedrzycka for costumes for Katyń	Won	
2008	Discovery of the Year	Tulpan directed by Sergey Dvortsevoy	Nominated	Kazakh-German-Italian-Russian-Polish-Swiss coproduction
2009	Best Short Film	Poste restante directed by Marcel Łoziński	Won	
2009	Best Short Film	The Glass Trap directed by Paweł Ferdek	Nominated	
2009	Critics Award	Sweet Rush directed by Andrzej Wajda	Won	
2009	Prix d'Excellence	Waldemar Pokromski for Make Up and Hair for The Baader Meinhof Complex	Nominated	German production
2010	Best Short Film	Hanoi - Warszawa directed by Katarzyna Klimkiewicz	Won	
2010	Best Director	Roman Polanski for The Ghost Writer	Won	French-born Polish-French director
2010	Discovery of the Year	Nothing Personal directed by Urszula Antoniak	Nominated	Dutch-Irish coproduction directed by Polish-born Polish-Dutch director
2011	Best Short Film	Paparazzi directed by Piotr Bernaś	Nominated	
2011	Best Short Film	Frozen Stories directed by Grzegorz Jaroszuk	Nominated	
2011	Best Cinematographer	Adam Sikora for Essential Killing	Nominated	
2012	People's Choice Award – Best Film	In Darkness directed by Agnieszka Holland	Nominated	Polish-German-Canadian coproduction
2013	Best Animated Feature Film	The Congress directed by Ari Folman	Won	Israeli-German-Polish-Luxembourger-French-Belgian coproduction
2014	People's Choice Award for Best European Film	Ida directed by Paweł Pawlikowski	Nominated	Polish-Danish coproduction; Polish-born Polish-British director
2016	European Film Award for Best Sound Designer	Radosław Ochnio for 11 Minutes	Won	Polish-Ireland coproduction
2018	European Film Award for Best Actress	Joanna Kulig for Cold War	Won	Polish-French-British coproduction
2018	European Film Award for Best Actor	Tomasz Kot for Cold War	Nominated	Polish-French-British coproduction
2018	European Film Award for Best Director	Paweł Pawlikowski for Cold War	Won	Polish-French-British coproduction
2018	European Film Award for Best Screenwriter	Paweł Pawlikowski for Cold War	Won	Polish-French-British coproduction
2018	European Film Award for Best Editor	Jarosław Kamiński for Cold War	Won	Polish-French-British coproduction
2018	Best Film	Cold War directed by Paweł Pawlikowski	Won	Polish-French-British coproduction
2019	People's Choice Award for Best European Film	Cold War directed by Paweł Pawlikowski	Won	Polish-French-British coproduction

== Honorary awards ==
Year	Award	Recipient	Note
1990	Lifetime Achievement	Andrzej Wajda	
1999	Achievement in World Cinema	Roman Polanski	French-born Polish-French director
2006	Lifetime Achievement	Roman Polanski	French-born Polish-French director

== Selection ==
Year	Film	Director	Note
1994	Three Colours: Blue	Krzysztof Kieślowski	Polish-French-Swiss co-production
1994	Three Colours: Red	Krzysztof Kieślowski	Polish-French-Swiss co-production
1994	Three Colours: White	Krzysztof Kieślowski	Polish-French-Swiss co-production
1997	Street Games	Krzysztof Krauze	
2000	Pan Tadeusz: The Last Foray in Lithuania	Andrzej Wajda	
2000	Wojaczek	Lech Majewski	
2001	Weiser	Wojciech Marczewski	
2002	The Pianist	Roman Polański	French-Polish-German-British co-production
2003	Edi	Piotr Trzaskalski	
2005	The Unburied Man	Marta Meszaros	Hungarian-Slovak-Polish co-production
2005	The Wedding	Wojciech Smarzowski	
2005	The Welts	Magdalena Piekorz	
2006	The Collector	Feliks Falk	
2006	Persona Non Grata	Krzysztof Zanussi	Polish-Russian-Italian co-production
2007	Saviour's Square	Krzysztof Krauze Joanna Kos-Krauze	
2008	Four Nights with Anna	Jerzy Skolimowski	
2008	Katyn	Andrzej Wajda	
2008	The Karamazovs	Petr Zelenka	Czech-Polish co-production
2009	33 Scenes from Life	Małgorzata Szumowska	Polish-German co-production
2009	Sweet Rush	Andrzej Wajda	
2010	Reverse	Borys Lankosz	
2011	Essential Killing	Jerzy Skolimowski	Polish-Norwegian-Irish-Hungarian co-production
2011	Suicide Room	Jan Komasa	
2012	Carnage	Roman Polański	French-German-Polish-Spanish co-production
2012	In Darkness	Agnieszka Holland	Polish-German-Canadian co-production
2012	Rose	Wojciech Smarzowski	
2013	The Congress	Ari Folman	Israeli-German-Polish-Luxembourgish-French-Belgian co-production
2013	Imagine	Andrzej Jakimowski	
2013	In the Name Of	Małgorzata Szumowska	
2014	Ida	Paweł Pawlikowski	Polish-Danish coproduction
2014	Walesa. Man of Hope	Andrzej Wajda	
2014	Papusza	Krzysztof Krauze, Joanna Kos-Krauze	
2015	Body	Małgorzata Szumowska	
2015	The Here After	Magnus von Horn	Polish-Swedish-French co-production
2015	Under Electric Clouds	Alexey German Jr.	Russian-Ukrainian-Polish co-production
2016	21 x New York	Piotr Stasik	Documentary Selection
2016	Dawn	Laila Pakalnina	Latvian-Polish-Estonian co-production
2016	I, Olga Hepnarová	Tomáš Weinreb & Petr Kazda	Czech-Polish-Slovak-French co-production
2016	The Lure	Agnieszka Smoczyńska	
2016	United States of Love	Tomasz Wasilewski	Polish-Swedish co-production
2017	Afterimage	Andrzej Wajda	
2017	Communion	Anna Zamecka	Documentary selection
2017	Frost	Sharunas Bartas	Lithuanian-French-Polish-Ukrainian co-production
2017	The Last Family	Jan P. Matuszyński	
2017	Spoor	Agnieszka Holland	Polish-German-Czech-Swedish-Slovak co-production
2018	Ayka	Sergey Dvortsevoy	Russian-German-Polish-Kazakh co-production
2018	The Captain	Robert Schwentke	German-French-Polish co-production
2018	Cold War	Paweł Pawlikowski	Polish-British-French co-production
2018	Dovlatov	Alexey German Jr.	Russian-Polish-Serbian co-production
2018	Fugue	Agnieszka Smoczyńska	Polish-Swedish-Czech co-production
2018	Mug	Małgorzata Szumowska	
2018	Pity	Babis Makridis	Greek-Polish co-production
2018	Under the Tree	Hafsteinn Gunnar Sigurðsson	Icelandic-German-Danish-Polish co-production
2019	Clergy	Wojciech Smarzowski	
2019	High Life	Claire Denis	German-Polish-British-French-American co-production
2019	Mr. Jones	Agnieszka Holland	Polish-British-Ukrainian co-production
2019	Weightlifter	Dmytro Sukholytkyy-Sobchuk	Short Film Selection, Ukrainian-Polish co-production
2019	Werewolf	Adrian Panek	Polish-German-Dutch co-production
2020	Charlatan	Agnieszka Holland	Czech-Irish-Polish-Slovak co-production
2020	Corpus Christi	Jan Komasa	Polish-French co-production
2021	Apples	Christos Nikou	Greek-Polish-Slovenian co-production
2021	Never Gonna Snow Again	Małgorzata Szumowska	Polish-German co-production
2021	Quo Vadis, Aida?	Jasmila Žbanić	Bosnian-Austrian-Dutch-French-Polish-Norwegian-German-Romanian-Turkish co-production
2021	The Whaler Boy	Philipp Yuryev	Russian-Polish-Belgian co-production
2022	Eo	Jerzy Skolimowski	Polish-Italian co-production

== See also ==
- List of Polish Academy Award winners and nominees
- List of Polish submissions for the Academy Award for Best Foreign Language Film
