= List of 1989 films based on actual events =

This is a list of films and miniseries released in 1989 that are based on actual events. All films on this list are from American production unless indicated otherwise.

== 1989 ==
- 84C MoPic (1989) – war drama film about a Long Range Reconnaissance Patrol (LRRP) mission during the Vietnam War
- 300 Miles to Heaven (Polish: 300 mil do nieba) (1989) – Polish biographical drama film based on the true story of the Zieliński brothers, two teenagers who escaped from Communist Poland in 1985
- A City of Sadness (Mandarin: 悲情城市) (1989) – Taiwanese historical drama film telling the story of a family embroiled in the "White Terror" that was wrought on the Taiwanese people by the Kuomintang government (KMT) after their arrival from mainland China in the late 1940s, during which thousands of Taiwanese and recent emigres from the Mainland were rounded up, shot, and/or sent to prison
- A Cry for Help: The Tracey Thurman Story (1989) – crime drama television film based on the 1985 ruling Thurman v. City of Torrington
- A Sign Days (Japanese: Aサインデイズ) (1989) – Japanese biographical drama film about the influx of American soldiers to Okinawa during the Vietnam War
- Billy the Kid (1989) – Western drama television film about famed gunman Billy the Kid
- Blaze (1989) – comedy drama film depicting the fictionalized story of the latter years of Earl Long, a flamboyant Governor of Louisiana, brother of assassinated governor and U.S. Senator Huey P. Long and uncle of longtime U.S. Senator Russell Long
- Bomber Harris (1989) – biographical drama television film based on the life of Arthur Harris, who was Commander-in-chief of RAF Bomber Command during the Second World War
- Born on the Fourth of July (1989) – biographical anti-war film depicting the life of Ron Kovic over a 20-year period, detailing his childhood, his military service and paralysis during the Vietnam War, and his transition to anti-war activism
- Casualties of War (1989) – war drama film based on the events of the 1966 incident on Hill 192 during the Vietnam War
- Chattahoochee (1989) – biographical drama film based on the real-life experiences of Chris Calhoun in a Florida state mental institution
- Cold Light of Day (1989) – British horror film based on the crimes of serial killer Dennis Nilsen, depicting a fictionalized account of his various murders leading up to his apprehension by authorities
- Communion (1989) – science fiction horror film based on the experiences of Whitley Strieber, who experiences "lost time" and terrifying flashbacks, which hypnosis undertaken by Budd Hopkins later links to an alleged encounter with aliens
- Cornflower Blue (German: Kornblumenblau) (1989) – Polish drama film based on a true story of a Polish musician who survived in Auschwitz-Birkenau because of accordion talent
- Countdown to War (1989) – historical war television film recounting the events that occurred between 15 March 1939, when the German army commanded by Adolf Hitler invaded Czechoslovakia and created the Protectorate of Bohemia and Moravia, and 3 September 1939, the date when France and United Kingdom declared war on Germany
- Cross of Fire (1989) – biographical drama miniseries based on the rape and murder of Madge Oberholtzer by D. C. Stephenson, a highly successful leader of the Indiana branch of Ku Klux Klan
- Darlings of the Gods (1989) – Australian biographical drama miniseries about the 1948 trip to Australia by Laurence Olivier and Vivien Leigh and the Old Vic Company, where Olivier and Leigh met Peter Finch
- Death of a Tea Master (Japanese: 千利休 本覺坊遺文) (1989) – Japanese biographical drama film based on real life events of Sen no Rikyū, particularly the events surrounding his ritual suicide
- Donator (1989) – Yugoslav biographical war drama film about Erich Šlomović, a Jewish art collector and his experiences during World War II
- Double Exposure: The Story of Margaret Bourke-White (1989) – biographical drama television film about the life of photographer Margaret Bourke-White
- Drugstore Cowboy (1989) – crime drama film about a pharmacy-robbing dope fiend and his crew who pop pills and evade the law, based on an autobiographical novel by James Fogle
- Everybody's Baby: The Rescue of Jessica McClure (1989) – biographical drama television film based on the true story of the rescue of 18-month-old Jessica McClure from a well
- Fat Man and Little Boy (1989) – epic historical war drama film following the Manhattan Project, the secret Allied endeavor to develop the first nuclear weapons during World War II
- The Favorite (1989) – Swiss-American historical drama film based on the unsubstantiated story of Aimée du Buc de Rivéry that takes place at the dawn of the 19th century
- The Final Days (1989) – biographical crime drama television film following the events in the Nixon White House after the Washington Post's Watergate revelations
- Fire and Rain (1989) – drama disaster television film based on the Delta Air Lines Flight 191 plane crash at Dallas/Fort Worth International Airport on 2 August 1985
- Francesco (1989) – historical drama film about the life of St. Francis of Assisi
- Glory (1989) – historical war drama film about the 54th Massachusetts Infantry Regiment, one of the Union Army's earliest African-American regiments in the American Civil War
- Goldeneye (1989) – British biographical drama television film about the life of the author Ian Fleming
- Goodnight, Sweet Marilyn (1989) – biographical drama film about the death of Marilyn Monroe
- Great Balls of Fire! (1989) – biographical drama film depicting the early career of Jerry Lee Lewis, from his rise to rock-and-roll stardom to his controversial marriage to his 13-year-old cousin that led to his downfall
- Henry V (1989) – historical biographical drama film based on the play of the same name by William Shakespeare telling the story of King Henry V of England, focusing on events immediately before and after the Battle of Agincourt during the Hundred Years' War
- The Heroes (1989) – British-Australian war drama miniseries about Operation Jaywick, a World War II special forces raid on Japanese shipping in Singapore harbour by the Australian Z Special Unit
- The Hijacking of the Achille Lauro (1989) – drama television film focusing on the action and emotional impact of the 1985 terrorist incident that took the life of Leon Klinghoffer
- Hush-a-Bye Baby (1989) – Northern Irish drama television film inspired by the real stories of fifteen-year-old Ann Lovett, the Kerry Babies case, and the discovery of an abandoned baby in the grotto of Derry's Long Tower Church
- I Know My First Name Is Steven (1989) – crime drama miniseries about kidnap victim Steven Stayner
- The Karen Carpenter Story (1989) – biographical drama television film about singer Karen Carpenter and the brother-and-sister pop music duo of which she was a part, The Carpenters
- Kuduz (1989) – Yugoslav drama film based on the true story of the outlaw Junuz Kečo
- Lean on Me (1989) – biographical drama film based on the story of Joe Louis Clark, a real life inner city high school principal in Paterson, New Jersey, whose school is in danger of being placed into receivership of the New Jersey state government unless students improve their test scores on the New Jersey Minimum Basic Skills Test
- My Left Foot (1989) – biographical drama film about Christy Brown, an Irish man born with cerebral palsy, who could control only his left foot
- The Littlest Victims (1989) – biographical drama television film depicting a true account of the life of pioneering AIDS doctor James Oleske
- Looking for Langston (1989) – British biographical drama film about high-society gay men during the Harlem Renaissance in New York City
- Love and Hate: The Story of Colin and JoAnn Thatcher (1989) – Canadian drama miniseries dramatizing the story of Colin Thatcher, a former Canadian politician who was convicted in 1984 of the murder of his ex-wife JoAnn following their divorce
- Murderers Among Us: The Simon Wiesenthal Story (1989) – biographical war drama television film about Simon Wiesenthal, from his imprisonment in a Nazi Concentration Camp, to his liberation and his rise to become one of the leading Nazi hunters in the world, bringing such criminals to justice as Adolf Eichmann and Klaus Barbie
- Paganini (1989) – biographical drama film based on the life and career of composer and virtuoso violinist Niccolò Paganini
- Passion and Paradise (1989) – crime drama television film about the murder of Harry Oakes
- Pedro I el Cruel (1989) – Spanish biographical drama miniseries about the life of Peter I of Castile
- Pestalozzi's Mountain (German: Pestalozzis Berg) (1989) – East German-Swiss biographical drama film about the life of Swiss educator Johann Heinrich Pestalozzi
- The Preppie Murder (1989) – crime drama television film based on the events of the murder of Jennifer Levin committed by Robert Chambers, nicknamed the "Preppie Killer"
- Resurrected (1989) – British war drama film based on the story of the British soldier Philip Williams
- Return from the River Kwai (1989) – British war film based on a 1979 factual book with the same name about a 1944 Japanese prisoner transport of 2,217 British and Australian POWs, who had been working as forced labour on the Burma Railway, building the bridge over the River Kwai
- Rikyu (Japanese: 利休) (1989) – historical drama film about the 16th century master of the Japanese tea ceremony, Sen no Rikyū
- Roe vs. Wade (1989) – biographical drama television film about the landmark 1973 United States Supreme Court decision Roe v. Wade
- Romero (1989) – biographical crime drama film depicting the story of Salvadoran Archbishop Óscar Romero, who organized peaceful protests against the violent military regime, eventually at the cost of his own life
- The Ryan White Story (1989) – biographical drama television film based on the true story of the American teenager Ryan White, who became a national poster child for HIV/AIDS in the United States, after being expelled from middle school because of his infection
- Save and Protect (Russian: Спаси и сохрани) (1989) – Soviet historical drama film depicting the decline of a childlike woman as she engages in adultery and falls into crippling debt
- Scandal (1989) – British historical drama film depicting a fictionalised account of the Profumo affair that rocked the government of British prime minister Harold Macmillan
- The Seventh Continent (German: Der siebente Kontinent) (1989) – Austrian drama film chronicling the last years of an Austrian family, which consists of Georg, an engineer; his wife Anna, an optician; and their young daughter – based on a news article about a family who committed suicide in the same manner
- Small Sacrifices (1989) – historical crime drama television film about Diane Downs and the murder and attempted murder of her three children
- Triumph of the Spirit (1989) – biographical drama film inspired by true events, set in the German POW camp at Auschwitz during the Holocaust and detailing how the Jewish Greek boxer Salamo Arouch was forced to fight other internees to the death for the SS guards' entertainment
- Unconquered (1989) – drama television film based on the struggles of Richmond Flowers, Sr., the Alabama attorney general who opposed many of Governor George Wallace's segregationist policies in the 1960s, and his son, star athlete Richmond Flowers, Jr.
- Winter of '54: Father Pierre (French: Hiver 54, l'abbé Pierre) (1989) – French biographical drama film recounting the efforts by a parish priest, Father Pierre, to gain assistance from the government for the homeless, who after World War II were living in poverty and suffering from one of the coldest winters on record
- Wired (1989) – biographical drama film about comedian and actor John Belushi
