= Anything Can Happen (Polish film) =

1995 Polish documentary film

- Wszystko może się przytrafić
- Directed by: Marcel Łoziński
- Written by: Marcel Łoziński
- Starring: Tomasz Łoziński
- Cinematography: Artur Reinhart
- Edited by: Katarzyna Maciejko-Kowalczyk
- Production companies: Studio Filmowe Kalejdoskop; Telewizja Polska
- Release date: 1995
- Running time: 39 minutes
- Country: Poland
- Language: Polish

Anything Can Happen (pol. Wszystko może się przytrafić) is a 1995 Polish documentary film written and directed by Marcel Łoziński. The film follows the director's six-year-old son, Tomasz, as he speaks with elderly people encountered in a Warsaw Łazienki Park.

== Synopsis ==
Tomasz travels through a park on a scooter and approaches elderly people sitting on benches. He asks them direct questions concerning happiness, loneliness, ageing, death and what they would change if they could begin their lives again. Their answers contrast the child's curiosity and imagination with the experiences and reflections of people nearing the end of their lives.

Łoziński later explained that he wanted to create an opportunity for people to speak about their lives and believed that his son could establish a more natural and candid relationship with the interviewees than an adult interviewer could.

== Production ==
The film was written and directed by Marcel Łoziński. Cinematography done by Artur Reinhart, the movie was edited by Katarzyna Maciejko-Kowalczyk, and the sound recorded by Halina Paszkowska. It was produced by Studio Filmowe Kalejdoskop and Telewizja Polska.

Sources give the running time as either 39 or 40 minutes. The International Documentary Film Festival Amsterdam and the Kraków Film Festival list a running time of 39 minutes, while Culture.pl gives 40 minutes.

== Themes and interpretation ==
The film focuses on existential questions rather than contemporary political or social issues. The encounters juxtapose childhood imagination with memories of ageing, loss and mortality.

Film critic Bożena Janicka described the work as a poetic essay about the passage of time and the vitality of life, while Krzysztof Kornacki interpreted the conversations as a confrontation between the child's unrestricted imagination and the experience-based outlook of the elderly participants.

== Reception and legacy ==
In 2016, the film placed first in an online audience poll for the best Polish documentary film in history. The poll accompanied the retrospective programme 100/100: Epoka Polskiego Filmu Dokumentalnego, organised to mark more than a century of Polish documentary cinema.

The film was also included in the Kraków Film Festival's 2010 retrospective selection of notable films from the festival's first fifty years.

== Awards ==
The film received the following awards and distinctions:

- the Golden Dragon Grand Prix and the FIPRESCI Prize at the 1995 Kraków Film Festival;
- a distinction from the International Federation of Film Societies at the 1995 International Short Film Festival Oberhausen;
- the Grand Prix and Kodak Award at the 1995 Baltic Film and Television Festival in Bornholm;
- the Golden Gate Award at the 1996 San Francisco International Film Festival;
- first prize in the documentary category at the 1997 World Television Festival in Tokyo.

== See also ==
The English title is shared with the unrelated 1952 American romantic comedy film Anything Can Happen, directed by George Seaton and starring José Ferrer and Kim Hunter.
