= List of 1980s films based on actual events =

This is an index of lists of films and miniseries released in the 1980s that are based on actual events.

- List of 1980 films based on actual events
- List of 1981 films based on actual events
- List of 1982 films based on actual events
- List of 1983 films based on actual events
- List of 1984 films based on actual events
- List of 1985 films based on actual events
- List of 1986 films based on actual events
- List of 1987 films based on actual events
- List of 1988 films based on actual events
- List of 1989 films based on actual events
