= Stanisław Rembek =

Polish novelist, teacher, soldier

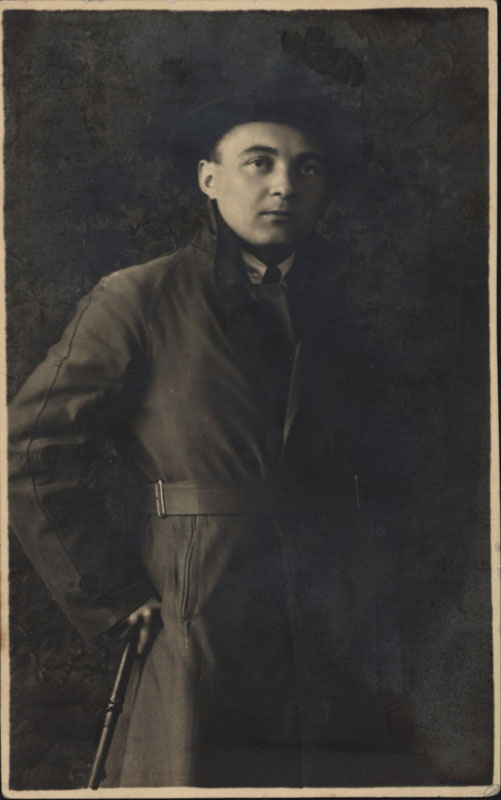
Stanisław Rembek

Stanisław Rembek (6 July 1901, Łódź – 21 March 1985, Warsaw) was a Polish writer, translator, teacher and soldier of the Home Army.

He was the author of the novels "Nagan", "W polu" (about the Polish-Soviet War), and "Wyrok na Franciszka Kłosa". "W polu" was called by Czesław Miłosz the best Polish book about the fight that was written in the interwar period. In the opinion of the Polish writer Maria Dąbrowska, "W polu" was a better book than "All Quiet on the Western Front" by Erich Maria Remarque. The novel received an award from the Francis de Sales Lewental Foundation. The book's reissue was blocked by communist censorship after World War II. "Wyrok na Franciszka Kłosa" directed by Andrzej Wajda, is based on Rembek's novel of the same title. The film "Szwadron" directed by Juliusz Machulski was based on Rembek's short stories.

== See also ==
- Isaac Babel
- Florian Czarnyszewicz
