= Arthur Reinhart =

Polish cinematographer, film editor, and producer (born 1965)

- Born: 24 March 1965 (age 61); Kluczbork, Poland
- Citizenship: Polish
- Occupations: cinematographer film editor

Arthur Reinhart (born 24 March 1965) is a Polish cinematographer, film editor and producer, recipient of two "Golden Frogs" from Camerimage festival, two Polish Film Awards for the best cinematography and three Polish Film Festival "Golden Lion" award for best cinematography, a member of Polish Society of Cinematographers.

== Biography ==
He first studied directing at Łódź Film School but after a year he changed a course to learn cinematography. He graduated in 1992.

In the beginning of his activity, he worked mostly on documentary and short films. He co-worked with Jacek Petrycki on cinematography for Marcel Łoziński film 89mm from Europe, which was nominated for an Academy Award for Best Documentary Short.

In 1994, he first worked with director Dorota Kędzierzawska, directing photography in the picture Wrony for which he received his first "Golden Frogue" at Camerimage festival.

== Selected filmography ==
- 1993: 89 mm od Europy
- 1994: Wrony (Plus Camermimage – "Golden Frogue"; also film editor)
- 1995: Prowokator
- 1997: Bandyta
- 1998: Nic (Polish Film Festival – best cinematography; also film editor and producer)
- 2003: Children of Dune (TV)
- 2005: Jestem (Plus Camermimage – Polish Film Competition Award, Polish Film Festival – best cinematography, Polish Film Award for the best cinematography; also film editor and producer)
- 2006: Tristan & Isolde
- 2007: Pora umierać (also film editor and producer)
- 2010: Jutro będzie lepiej (also film editor and producer)
- 2010: Wenecja (Plus Camermimage – "Golden Frogue", Polish Film Festival – best cinematography, Polish Film Award for the best cinematography)
- 2012: Hatfields & McCoys (American Society of Cinematographers Award – Outstanding Achievement in Cinematography in Television Movie/Mini-Series – nominated)
- 2021: Girls to Buy
