= Polish Argentines =

Ethnic group

Polscy Argentyńczycy (Polish) Polaco-argentinos (Spanish)
- (Argentina) (Poland)
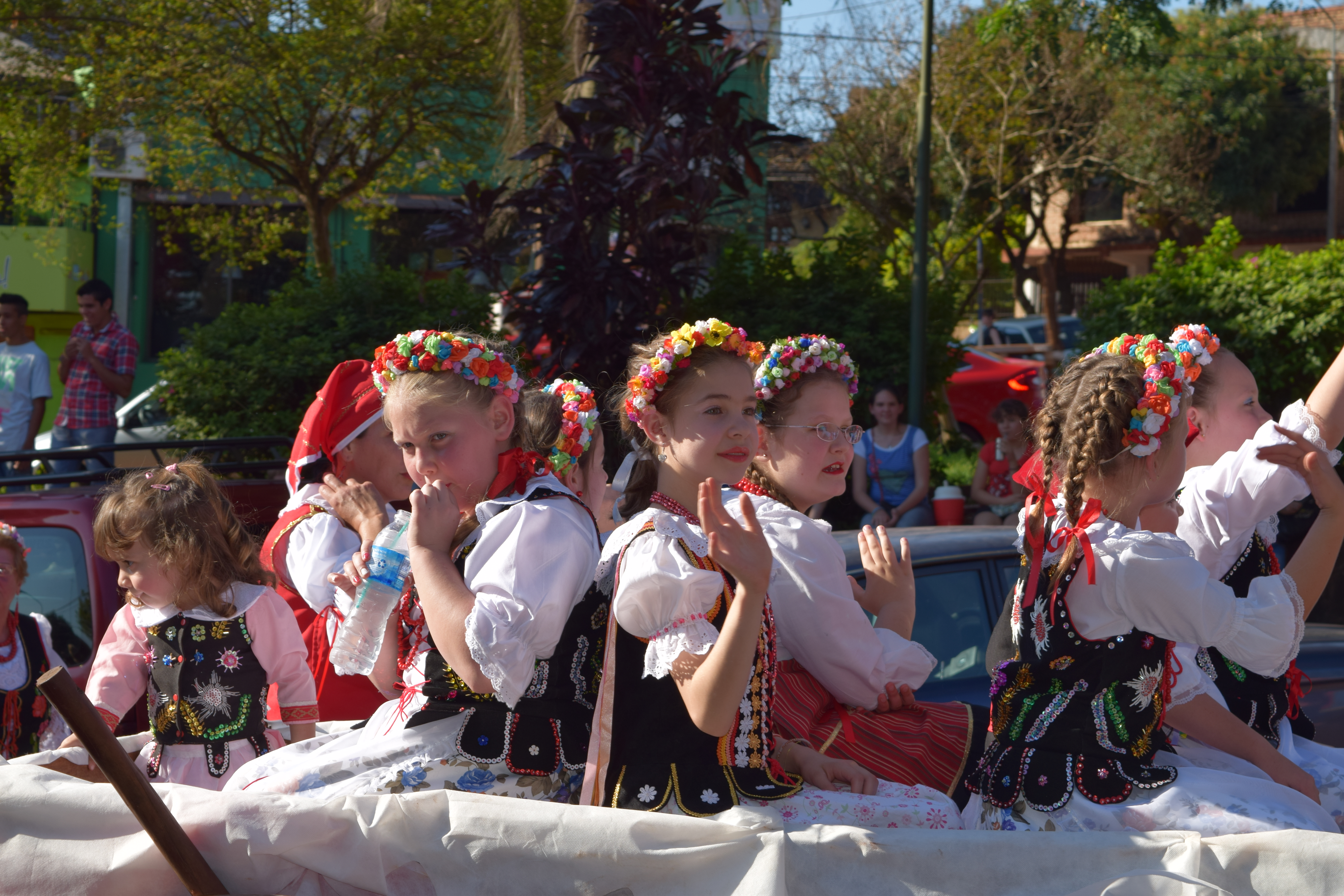
- Polish Argentines in the inaugural parade of the Immigrant's Festival

Total population
- Unknown (by birth); 500,000 (by ancestry, Polish embassy estimate in 2004)

Regions with significant populations
- Predominantly in the Pampas, Misiones, Chaco and Córdoba

Languages
- Spanish · Polish

Religion
- Majority: Catholicism; Minority: Judaism · Irreligion

Related ethnic groups
- Poles · Ashkenazim · Polish Brazilian · Polish American · Polish Canadians

Polish Argentines (Spanish: polaco-argentinos; Polish: polscy argentyńczycy) are Argentine citizens of full or partial Polish ancestry or Poland-born people who reside in Argentina. Poland was the fourth largest net migrants contributor after Italy, Spain and Germany. It is hard to give an exact number of Polish immigrants to Argentina.

== Polish immigration to Argentina ==
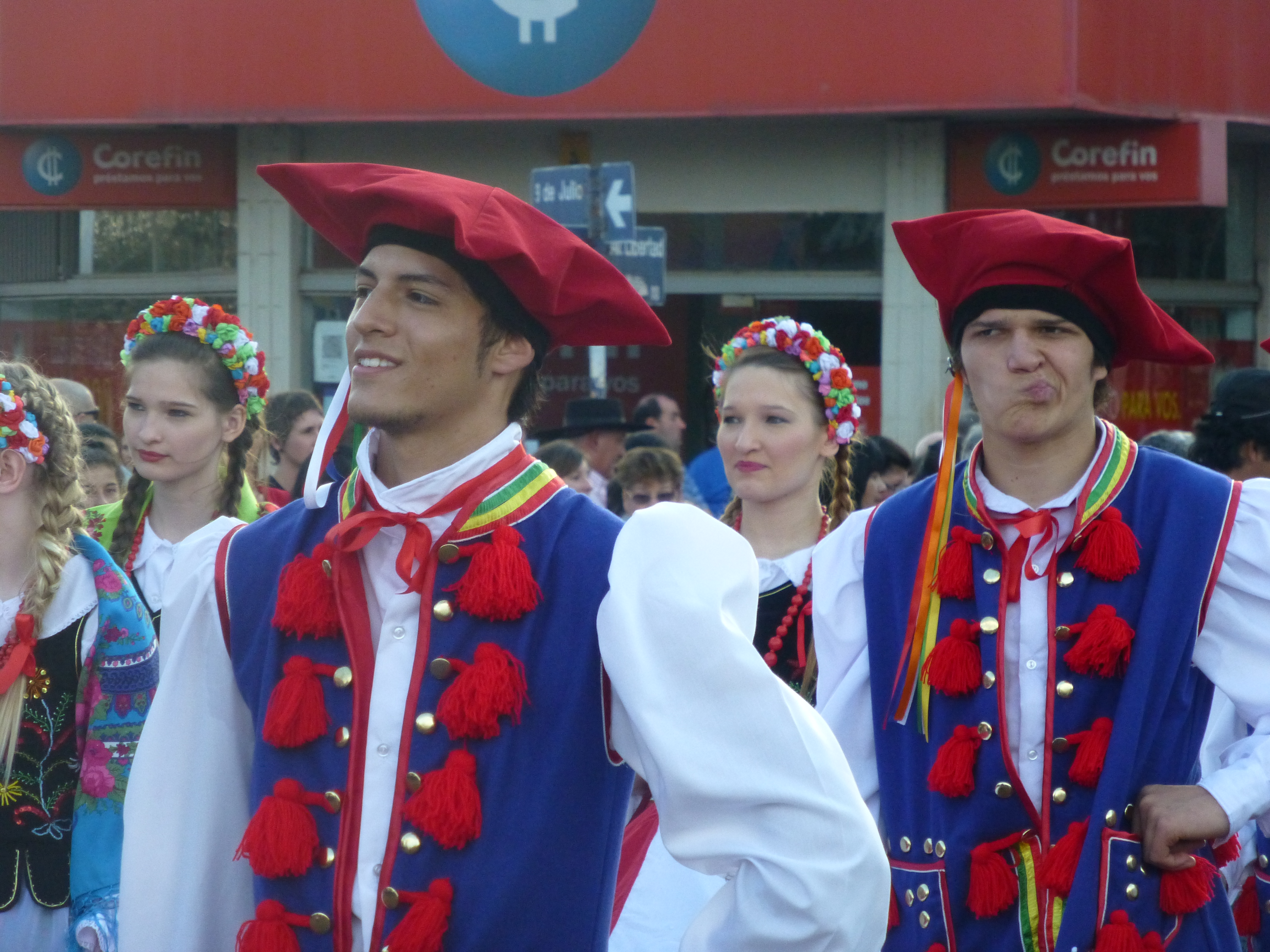
Polish community during the parade of the XXXIV Immigrant's Festival in Oberá, Misiones.

It is not easy to determine the number of Poles who immigrated to Argentina. Before 1919, they were registered as Germans, Austrians, or Russians. Polish immigrants to Argentina were made up of three distinct groups: the Catholic ethnic Poles (25%), the Orthodox and Eastern Catholic Ruthenians (45-50%) and the Polish Jews (25-30%). Between 1921 and 1976, 200,000 immigrants from Poland permanently settled in Argentina.

The first Poles arrived in Argentina during the 19th century. In 1890, the first Polish organization in Argentina was founded (Towarzystwo Polskie). For many years, the Misiones Province was the major Polish center in Argentina.

== Post-World War II Immigration and the Polish Engineering Diaspora in Argentina ==
A significant wave of Polish immigration occurred after World War II, primarily composed of war-displaced civilians, professionals, and soldiers. Many arrived with provisional documents issued by military or civil authorities in Great Britain or the International Refugee Organization, rather than Polish passports. Although more than 20,000 Polish citizens came to Argentina during this period, only 9,000 were officially registered as Poles due to bureaucratic limitations.

This group can be divided into two categories: former civilians released from Soviet labor camps following the Sikorski–Stalin agreement in 1941, and Polish military personnel who fought under General Władysław Anders, including participants in the Italian campaign and the Battle of Monte Cassino. Many of them chose to settle in Argentina rather than return to Soviet-controlled Poland.

In 1947, the Polish Association of Engineers and Technicians (PSIT) was founded in Buenos Aires. As recalled by Professor Tadeusz Hajduk during its 15th anniversary, it was a unique historical moment in which hundreds of highly qualified Polish engineers, many of whom had worked for the Allied war effort, contributed their expertise to Argentine industry. The majority were employed by Fabricaciones Militares under the direction of engineer Witold Wierzejski, who had previously overseen arms production in Poland, France, and the UK.

Today it is estimated that between 500,000 and 1 million Argentinians have Polish ancestry. Over a quarter of Misiones population has Polish roots (250,000 persons), the highest concentration of Polish Argentines in the country. About 140,000 Poles live in Buenos Aires; other Argentine cities with large Polish populations include Córdoba, Rosario and Santa Fe.

A major organization of the Polish minority is the Polish Association in Argentina (Związek Polaków w Argentynie).

In 1995 the Argentine National Congress made June 8 Polish Settlers' Day.

== Notable people ==
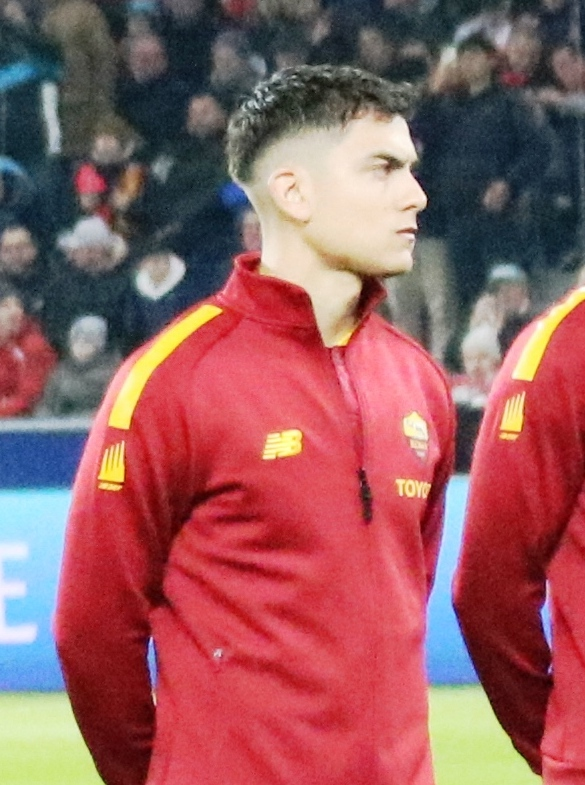
Paulo Exequiel Dybala, professional footballer.

- Carlos Bielicki, chess master
- Fabián Bielinsky (1959-2006), movie director
- John Bocwinski, football player
- Juan Pablo Brzezicki, ex tennis player
- Vladislao Cap (1934-1982), ex football player and manager
- Gisela Dulko, tennis player
- Paulo Dybala, football player
- Ricardo Dyrgalla, pre-war Polish glider pilot and aeronautical engineer, known as one of the country’s leading soaring champions in the 1930s. He later became a promoter of aviation culture in Argentina.
- Cristian Dzwonik aka "Nik", cartoonist
- Juan Foyth, football player
- Francisco Fydriszewski, football player
- Witold Gombrowicz (1904-1969), writer
- Guido Kaczka, TV presenter, radio host
- Enzo Kalinski, football player
- Diego Klimowicz, football player
- Frank Darío Kudelka, football coach
- Miguel Najdorf (1910-1997), chess master
- Marzenka Novak, actress
- Mario Pasik, actor
- Chango Spasiuk, musician
- Ayelén Stepnik, field hockey player
- Fernando Troyansky, football player
- Rubén Wolkowyski, basketball player
- Ricardo Zielinski, ex football player and presently coach
- Tadeusz Witold Wierzejski, engineer and first president of the Polish Engineers and Technicians Center in Buenos Aires. He helped launch a multilingual technical journal and worked under contract for Argentina’s Fabricaciones Militares after WWII.

== Figures ==
Polish net migration to Argentina from 1921 to 1976
| Year period | Polish immigrants |
|---|---|
| 1921-1930 | 119,410 |
| 1931-1940 | 31,500 |
| 1941-1950 | 16,784 |
| 1951-1960 | 325 |
| 1961-1970 | 1,845 |
| 1971-1976 | -529 |
| Total | 169,335 |

== See also ==
- Argentina–Poland relations
- Polish diaspora
- Argentines of European descent
- Zwi Migdal
- Florian Czarnyszewicz
- Witold Gombrowicz
