= Summer Love (2006 film) =

2006 film

- Film poster
- Directed by: Piotr Uklański
- Written by: Piotr Uklański (screenplay)
- Starring: Bogusław Linda; Karel Roden; Val Kilmer
- Cinematography: Jacek Petrycki
- Music by: Karel Holas
- Release date: November 18, 2006
- Running time: 94 minutes
- Country: Poland
- Language: English

Summer Love also known as Dead Man's Bounty, is a 2006 Polish Western film written and directed by Piotr Uklański. It stars Bogusław Linda, Karel Roden, and Val Kilmer.

== Plot ==
The plot involves a desert countryside with a group of rowdy cowboys, a woman bar tender and a drunkard sheriff.

A peaceful village suddenly turns violent when a certain stranger walks into a bar with the poster of a wanted man. He enters into a scuffle with other cowboys. He manages to escape from the clutches of the locals and then is chased by them.
