= Bastard (1997 film) =

1997 film

- Directed by: Maciej Dejczer
- Written by: Cezary Haracimowicz
- Produced by: Edouard Douek Leonardo de La Fuente
- Starring: Til Schweiger; Polly Walker; John Hurt, Pete Postlethwaite
- Cinematography: Marian Prokop; Artur Reinhart
- Music by: Michał Lorenc
- Production company: DPI PROPAGANDA BOJE BUCK FILMS
- Release date: 7 November 1997
- Running time: 102 minutes
- Countries: Poland, France
- Language: English

Bastard (Polish: Bandyta) (International: Brute) is a 1997 Polish-German-French drama film directed by Maciej Dejczer. The film contains a popular music theme Elena's Dance ("Taniec Eleny") composed by Michał Lorenc. The screenplay was awarded the Hartley Merril Prize. The film won several awards at Gdansk Film Festival

== Cast ==
- Til Schweiger as Brute
- Polly Walker as Mara
- Pete Postlethwaite as Sincai
- John Hurt as Babits
- Ida Jabłońska as Elena
- Wojciech Brzeziński as Iorgu
- Anthony Higgins as the prison director
