= Wojciech Klata =

Polish actor (born 1976)

- Born: 27 January 1976 (age 50); Warsaw, Poland
- Occupation: Actor
- Years active: 1988-present

Wojciech Klata (born 27 January 1976) is a Polish actor. He starred in the opening episode of the Dekalog series directed by Krzysztof Kieślowski. He has appeared in nearly 20 films and television shows since 1988. In 1993, he played the role of Lisiek in the Steven Spielberg directed historical drama Schindler's List.

== Filmography ==
Year	Title	Role	Notes
1988	Amerykanka		
1989	Dekalog	Paweł	TV Mini-Series, 1 episode
1989	300 Miles to Heaven	Grzes	
1990	Korczak	Szloma	
1992	Szwadron	Symcha	
1992	Pierścionek z orłem w koronie	Labeda	
1992	Enak	Mario Salerno	
1993	Schindler's List	Lisiek	
1995	Awantura o Basie		
2000	Boys Don't Cry	Oskar	
2000	Musisz zyc	Jacek	
2002	Król przedmiescia	Seweryn Kowalski	TV series, 13 episodes
