= Argentina–Poland relations =

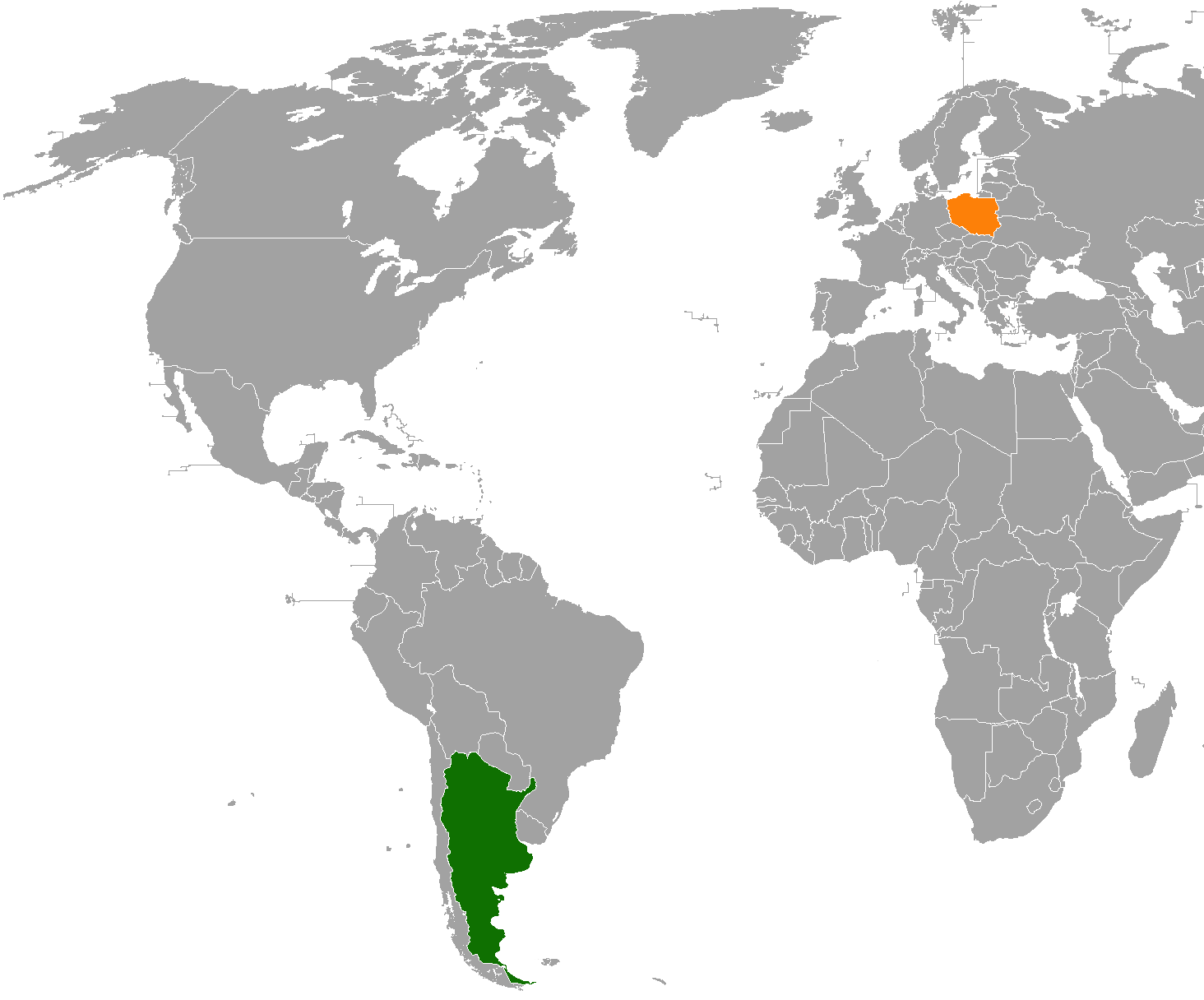
- Argentina: Poland

Argentina–Poland relations are the diplomatic and bilateral ties between the Argentine Republic and the Republic of Poland, have existed for over a century. Over 500,000 Argentinians are of Polish descent making Argentina the second Latin-American country with the largest Polish community abroad (after Brazil).

== History ==
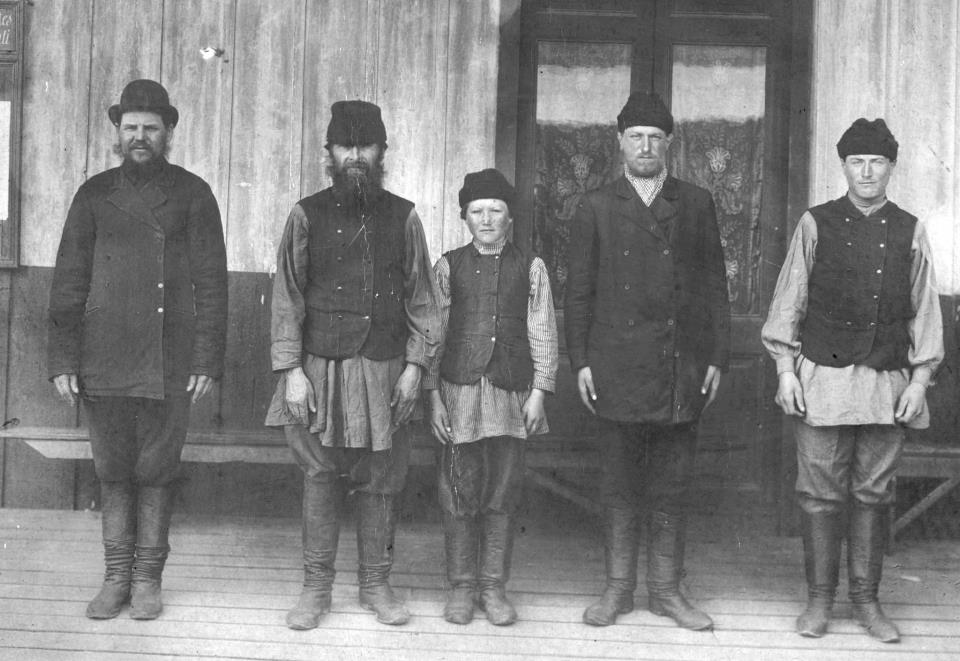
Polish immigrants in Argentina; 1890.

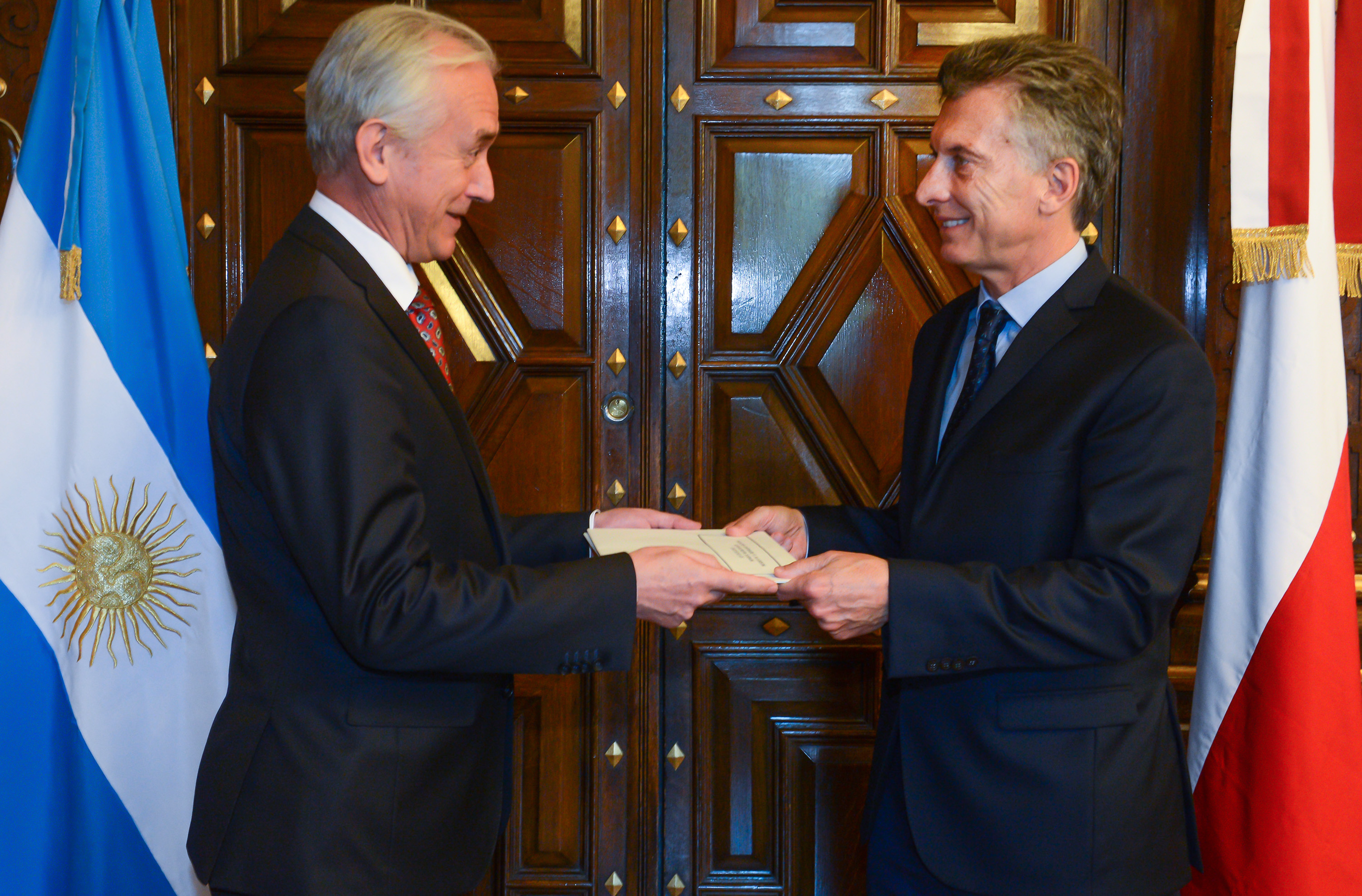
Argentine President Mauricio Macri receiving the credentials of Polish Ambassador Marek Pernal; 2016.

The first significant arrival of Polish immigrants to Argentina occurred in the late 1800s when Poles fleeing poverty and war arrived to Argentina to start a new beginning with many settling in Misiones Province, in northern Argentina. The first official contact between Argentina and Poland occurred at the end of World War I in 1918 when a newly independent Poland emerged. In 1920, both nations officially established diplomatic relations. Diplomatic relations continued during the German occupation: Argentina continued to recognise the diplomat appointed by the former government, and appointed a representative to the government in exile in London. In 1964, both nations upgraded their diplomatic legations to embassies.

While Poland was under communism and Argentina under dictatorship, relations between both countries were limited. In 1986, Argentina Vice-President Víctor Hipólito Martínez paid a visit to Poland. In October 1990, President Carlos Menem became the first Argentine head of state to visit Poland. In February 1995, Polish President Lech Wałęsa paid an official visit to Argentina.

== Bilateral relations ==
Throughout the years, both nations have signed several bilateral agreements such as an Agreement on Interchanging Diplomatic Pouches (1931); Agreement on Economic and Technical Cooperation (1974); Agreement on Maritime Fishing Cooperation (1974); Agreement on a joint venture for Export and Marketing of Fisheries and Invertebrate Resources (1974); Agreement on Scientific and Technological Cooperation (1979); Agreement on Mining Cooperation (1982); Agreement on Scientific and Cultural Cooperation (1984); Agreement on the Elimination of Visa Requirements on Ordinary, Official and Diplomatic Passports (1990); Agreement on the Promotion and Protection of Investments (1992) and an Agreement on the Avoidance of Double Taxation (2003).

== Trade ==
In 2018, trade between Argentina and Poland totaled US$846 million. Argentina's main exports to Poland include: soybean meal, fish fillets, processed fruits, nuts and wine. Poland's main exports to Argentina include: steel profiles, mining machinery, engines, domestic appliances, wires and TV screens. Argentina is Poland's second largest trading partner in South America.

== Resident diplomatic missions ==
- Argentina has an embassy in Warsaw.
- Poland has an embassy in Buenos Aires.
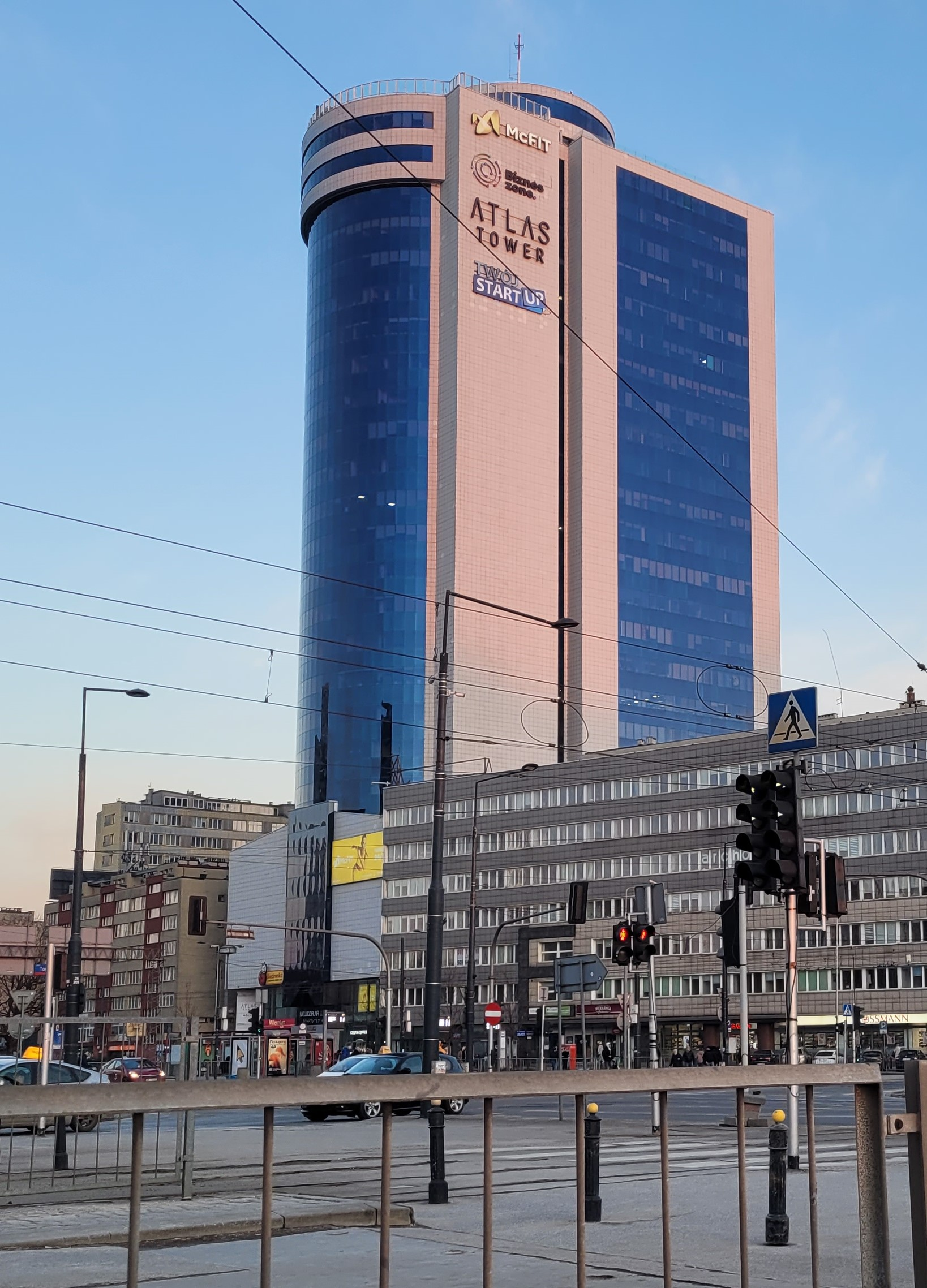
Atlas Tower hosting the Embassy of Argentina in Warsaw

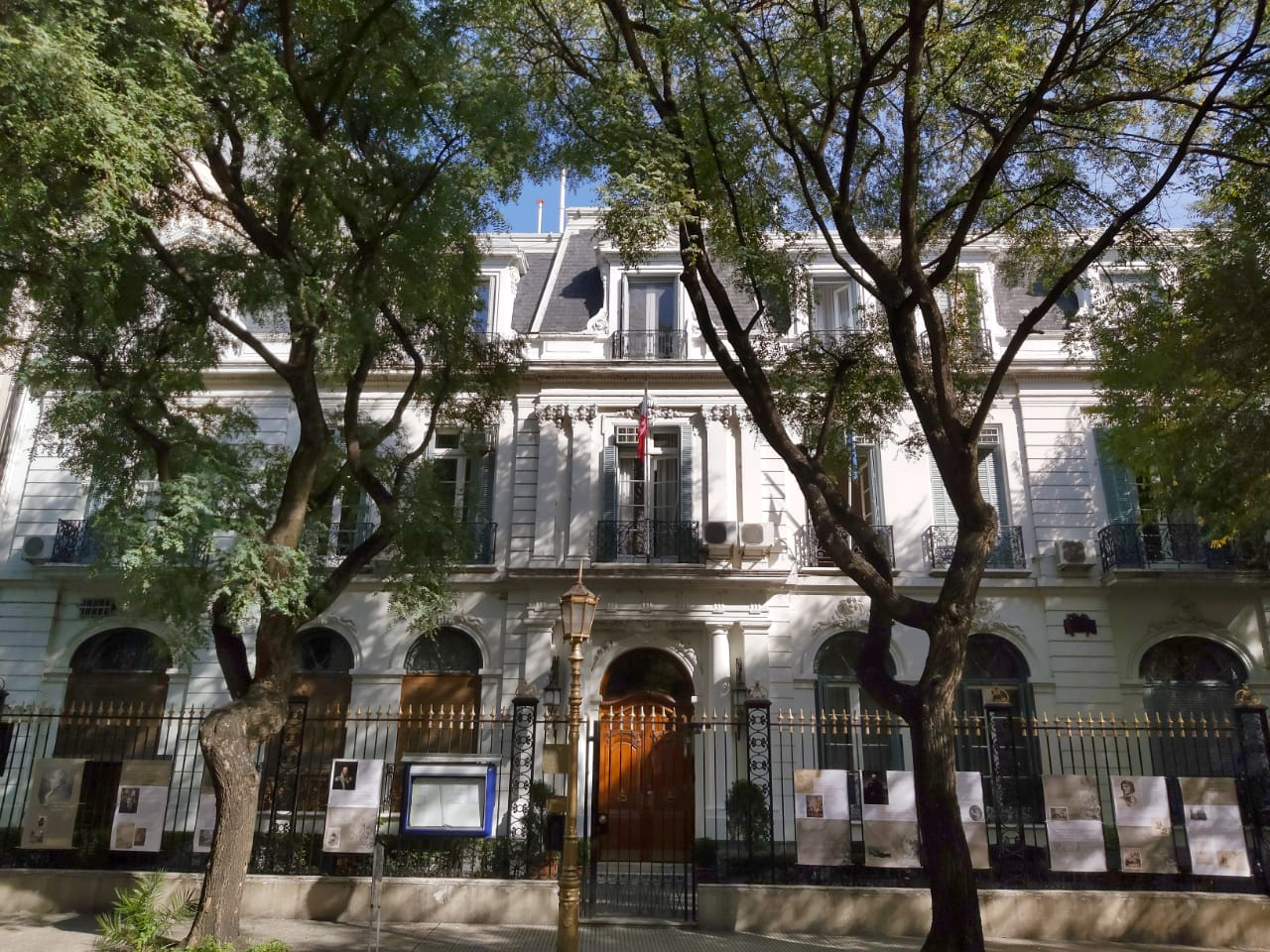
Embassy of Poland in Buenos Aires

== See also ==
- Foreign relations of Argentina
- Foreign relations of Poland
- Polish Argentine
