= Szwadron =

1993 Polish historical film

- Directed by: Juliusz Machulski
- Written by: Juliusz Machulski
- Starring: Aleksander Bednarz
- Release date: 28 October 1993
- Running time: 100 minutes
- Country: Poland
- Language: Polish

Szwadron is a Polish historical film directed by Juliusz Machulski. It was released in 1993. The film was selected as the Polish entry for the Best Foreign Language Film at the 66th Academy Awards, but was not accepted as a nominee. The film was based on Rembek's short stories.

== Plot ==
Period war drama. A highly fictionalised account on the exploits of the Russian Imperial Army Regiment of Dragoons of Novorossia and Don Cossacks during Polish January Uprising in 1863. A young Russian Count Fyodor Yeryiomin joins his regiment as a lieutenant in May 1863. He finds friends, enemies and love ... but, above all, he finds doubts.

== Cast ==
- Aleksander Bednarz as Petersilge
- Grzegorz Damiecki
- Bernard-Pierre Donnadieu as Franek Bata
- Janusz Gajos as Dobrowolski
- Wojciech Klata as Symcha (as Wojtek Klata)
- Andrzej Konic as General
- Maciej Kozłowski as Kozlow
- Agnieszka Krukówna as Weronka
- Katarzyna Lochowska as Emilia

== See also ==
- List of submissions to the 66th Academy Awards for Best Foreign Language Film
- List of Polish submissions for the Academy Award for Best Foreign Language Film
