= Dariusz Jabłoński (director) =

Polish film director and producer (born 1961)

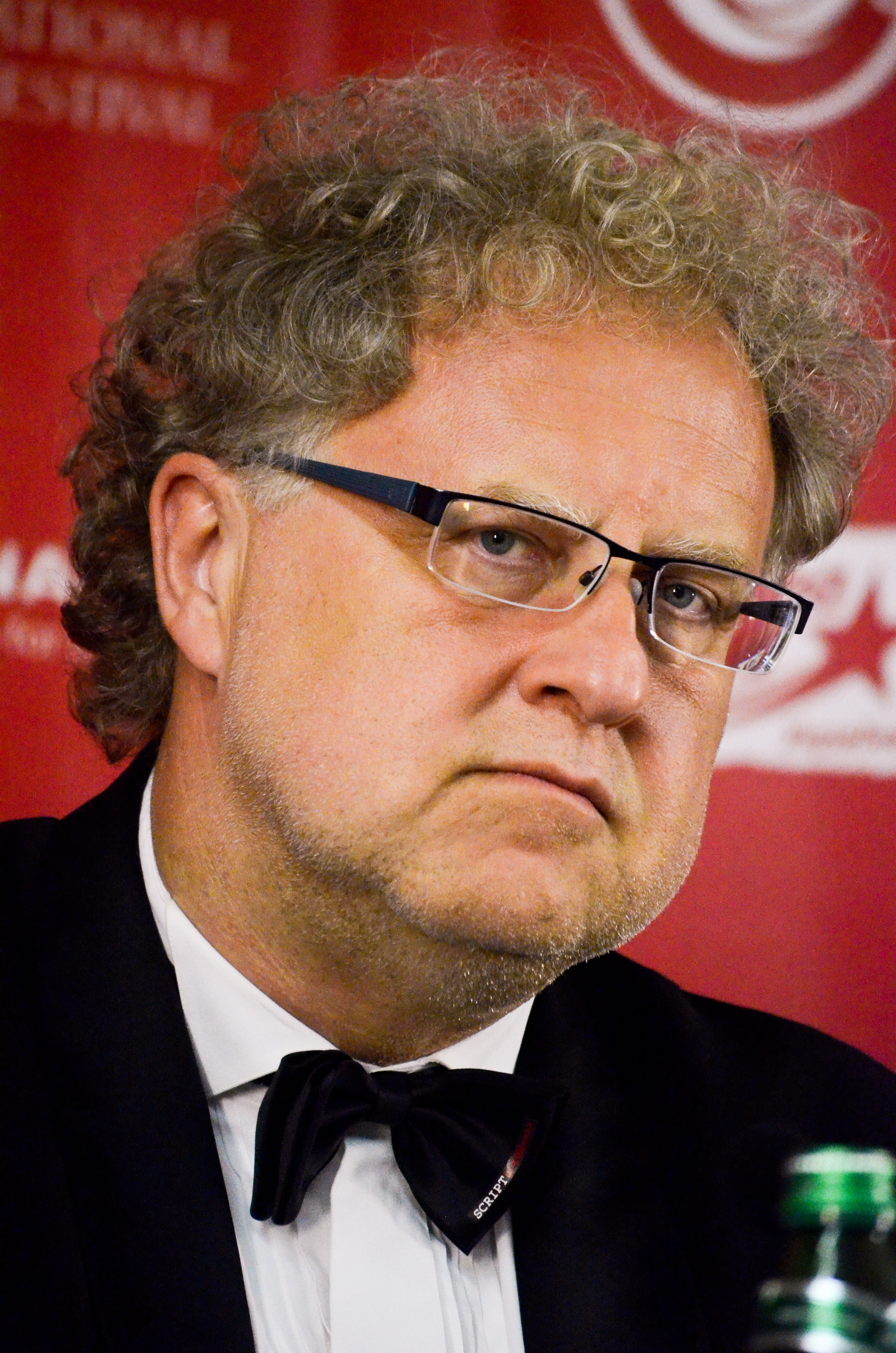
- Jabłoński at the Odesa International Film Festival in 2015
- Born: 30 May 1961 (age 65); Poland
- Education: Łódź Film School
- Occupations: Film director; producer
- Known for: 21 documentaries, 15 feature films and numerous tele-plays.
- Awards: Grand Prix FIPA D'OR; VPRO Joris Ivens Award; Best Non-fiction TV Program; Best Documentary; Adolf Grimme Award; Bavarian TV Award

Dariusz Jabłoński (born 30 May 1961) is a Polish film director and producer, president of his own production company, Apple Film Productions, and one of the leading independent producers in Poland.

== Early life and education ==
Jabłoński was born 30 May 1961 in Poland.

He is a graduate of the Łódź Film School in Łódź, Poland.

== Career ==
He has worked on the biggest films in Polish cinematography – as a Second Director on Dekalog by Krzysztof Kieślowski and as First Assistant Director on the "White Visiting Card" and "Magnate" by Filip Bajon. He produced and directed "The Visit of an Elderly Lady" (1986) – the first Polish independent film—and Photographer (1998), which received a number of international film awards: Grand Prix FIPA D'OR and Prix Planete in Biarritz (1999); Grand Prix VPRO Joris Ivens Award at IDFA in Amsterdam (1998); Prix Europa for Best Non-fiction TV Program (1998); Best Documentary in Banff (1999); Best Documentary at Double Take, Durham; Grimme Prize in Germany (2000); Bavarian TV Prize (1999). His work has also been screened at the TOP TEN Mediaforum Conference in Cologne. In addition, he has won awards at many international and Polish film festivals.

In 1990 he founded Apple Film Productions, which has produced more than 21 documentaries, 15 feature films and numerous tele-plays. Most of these were co-produced by Polish Television, Canal+, WDR, ARTE as well as other international producers. Additionally, many of these productions have received myriad international film awards.

Jabłoński is a founder of the Polish Film Awards and the Polish Film Academy as well as of the Independent Film Foundation, created to promote Art House films and their writers. The Independent Film Foundation is also running "ScripTeast", an innovative training program designed specifically for experienced scriptwriters from Eastern and Central Europe. He has finished many special courses (ex. European Film College) and received many international scholarships for European film professionals.

He is also a member of the European Film Academy. In 2012 he was elected president of the Polish Film Academy.

He was a BBC candidate for the producer of the series about Rittmeister Pilecki.

== Filmography ==
=== Writer ===
- 2008 – War Games
- 1998 – Photographer
- 1992 – Mondo Migliore
- 1989 – Elegy for a Lady

=== Director ===
- 2019 – The Pleasure Principle - series of 10 Episodes (available on Arte.tv in Polish, French and German)
- 2008 – War Games
- 2007 – Strawberry Wine
- 1998 – Photographer
- 1994 – Meeting
- 1992 – Artur Brauner
- 1992 – Mondo migliore
- 1990 – Better World
- 1990 – Last Shabbes Goy
- 1989 – Elegy for a lady
- 1985 – Jóźko
- 1985 – Help

=== Actor ===
- 1988 – Dekalog: Seven (Wojtek's Friend)

=== Producer ===
- 2012 – Aftermath
- 2009 – Janosik. True story
- 2007 – Strawberry Wine
- 2005–2007 – Codzienna 2 m. 3 (TV series)
- 2005 – Solidarity, Solidarity...
- 2004 – My Father, My Wife and My Lover
- 2003–2008 – The Cop (TV series)
- 2003 – Saved by Miracle
- 2002 – My Fried Chicken
- 2001 – The Spring To Come
- 2001 – Bellissima
- 2001 – Dated 20th Century
- 2000 – Sucker Season
- 2000 – Reed Dance
- 1999 – I'm Looking at You, Mary
- 1999 – The Gateway of Europe
- 1998 – Photographer
- 1998 – Sekal Has to Die
- 1998 – The Auricle
- 1996 – The Dogs of Totalitarian Regime
- 1996 – Department IV
- 1996 – Street Games
- 1994 – The Gardens of Tadeusz Reichstein
- 1994 – Return
- 1994 – Kieslowski meets Wenders
- 1993 – Hrabal
- 1992 – Mondo migliore
- 1992 – Artur Brauner
- 1991 – Repetition of Conrad
- 1986 – The Visit of the Old Lady
