= Fotoamator =

- International poster
- Directed by: Dariusz Jablonski
- Written by: Andrzej Bodek; Dariusz Jablonski
- Produced by: Dariusz Jablonski
- Cinematography: Tomasz Michałowski
- Edited by: Milenia Fiedler
- Music by: Michał Lorenc
- Release date: 1998
- Running time: 52 minutes
- Country: Poland
- Languages: Polish; German; French; English

Fotoamator (internationally released as Photographer ) is a 1998 Polish documentary film directed by Dariusz Jablonski, examining the life of the Jewish population and their Nazi overseers in the Łódź Ghetto.

== Subject ==
In 1987, several hundred color slides documenting scenes from the Łódź Ghetto during World War II were discovered in a second-hand bookstore in Vienna, Austria. These slides were the work of Walter Genewein, an Austrian citizen serving the Nazis. Being an accountant in the ghetto's council, he solicited for turning the ghetto into a prosperous and well-organised company, and since he was not just an ambitious office worker, but also an enthusiastic photographer, he recorded their "achievements" with a camera.

Genewein's slides are used by the authors to show—both through them and, to some extent, in spite of them—the real history of the Łódź Ghetto and the suffering and eventual extermination of the Polish Jews living there. The photographs are combined and compared with the recollections of Dr. Arnold Mostowicz, who worked as a doctor in the ghetto, and the last surviving witness of the events.

== Awards ==
- Adolf Grimme Awards 2000 – Documentary/Cultural
- Amsterdam International Documentary Film Festival 1999 – Joris Ivens Award
- Banff Television Festival 1999 – Banff Rockie Award
- Bavarian TV Award 1999
- Biarritz International Festival of Audiovisual Programming 1999 – Golden FIPA & Prix Planète
- Cracow Film Festival 1998 – Don Quixote Award
- DoubleTake Documentary Film Festival1998 – Jury Award
