= Provincial Actors =

1979 film by Agnieszka Holland

- Aktorzy prowincjonalni
- Directed by: Agnieszka Holland
- Written by: Agnieszka Holland; Witold Zatorski
- Starring: Tadeusz Huk; Halina Labonarska
- Cinematography: Jacek Petrycki
- Edited by: Halina Nawrocka
- Music by: Andrzej Zarycki
- Production company: Film Polski
- Release date: 10 August 1979
- Running time: 121 minutes
- Country: Poland

Provincial Actors (Polish: Aktorzy prowincjonalni) is a 1979 Polish drama film directed by Agnieszka Holland. It is her feature-length directorial debut.

== Plot ==
The film depicts Slawomir Szczepan (played by Tomasz Zygadlo), a young theater director from Warsaw, arriving in the provinces to put on the play Liberation by Stanisław Wyspiański. There he clashes with the aging lead actor Krzysztof (Tadeusz Huk), who sees it as a chance to make a once-in-a-lifetime performance.
