= Michał Lorenc =

Polish film score composer (born 1955)

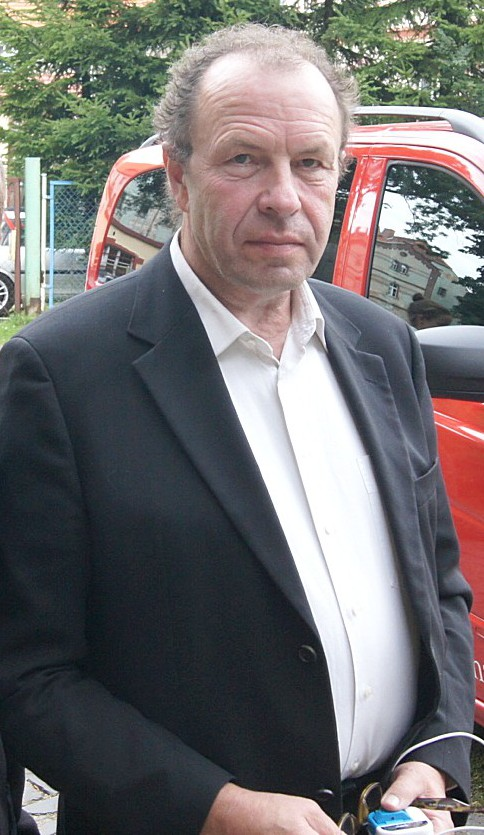
- Lorenc in 2012

Background information
- Born: 5 October 1955 (age 70); Warsaw, Poland
- Genres: Film scores
- Occupation: Composer
- Years active: 1979-present

Michał Lorenc (Polish: [ˈmixaw ˈlɔrɛnt͡s]; born 5 October 1955) is a Polish film score composer, who composed music of films such as 300 Miles to Heaven (1989), Psy (1992), Bastard (1997), Blood and Wine (1997) and Little Rose (2010).

== Career ==
He was born on 5 October 1955 in Warsaw. In 1973, he joined the folk rock band Wolna grupa Bukowina founded by Wojciech Belon and remained one of its members for four years. In the 1970s, he collaborated with Marcin Wolski on Polish Radio Programme 3 and frequently appeared on Maciej Zembaty's radio show Zgryz. Between 1979 and 1981, he was one of the members of Teatr panoramiczny together with Jacek Kleyff and Michał Tarkowski.

Since his debut in 1979, Lorenc has composed music for more than 150 feature films, documentaries, TV series and theatre performances. He has won five Golden Lions at the Gdynia Film Festival and Polish Film Festival Award for best movie score. The films and TV series in which his film scores appear include Sekal Has to Die, Little Rose, 300 Miles to Heaven, A Prominent Patient, Ojciec Mateusz, Bastard, Fotoamator, Four Nights with Anna, Kołysanka, Exit in Red, Kanalia, Sauna, Kroll, Deborah, Przedwiośnie, Żurek, Glina, Złoto dezerterów, Amok and Nic.

In 1996, he wrote the score for Bob Rafelson's film Blood and Wine starring Jack Nicholson, Jennifer Lopez and Michael Caine. It was selected by 20th Century Fox film studio for an Academy Award nomination.

In 2016, to celebrate the 1050 anniversary of the Baptism of Poland as well as the opening of the Temple of Divine Providence in Warsaw, an album entitled Przymierze containing Lorenc's music works was released. The same year, he received Poland's highest official distinction - the Order of the White Eagle. He is a member of the European Film Academy, the Polish Film Academy and the Czech Film Academy.

== Works ==
- Przyjaciele ("Friends") (TV series, 1979)
- Latawiec ("A Kite") (1982)
- Żuraw i czapla ("Crane and Heron") (1985)
- Magma (1986)
- Kalejdoskop (1986)
- A żyć trzeba dalej (1986)
- Łuk Erosa ("Eros' Bow") (1987)
- Zakole (1988)
- 300 Miles to Heaven (1989)
- Bal na dworcu w Koluszkach (1989)
- Paziowie (TV series, 1989)
- Historia niemoralna ("An Immoral Story") (1990)
- Kanalia (1990)
- Kapitan Konrad (1990)
- Pension sonnenschein (1990)
- Superwizja (1990)
- Zakład (1990)
- Ferdydurke (1991)
- Dziecko szczęścia (1991)
- Halo, jestem tutaj! (1991)
- Koniec gry ("Game Over") (1991)
- Kroll (1991)
- Kapitan Conrad (TV series, 1991)
- Pamiętnik znaleziony w garbie (1992)
- Psy (1992)
- Sauna (1992)
- Embrion ("Embryo") (1993)
- Lazarus (1993)
- Lepiej być piękną i bogatą (1993)
- A Magzat (1993)
- Skutki noszenia kapelusza w maju (1993)
- Wow (1993)
- Łowca. Ostatnie starcie (1993)
- Podróż na wschód ("Journey to the East") (1994)
- Psy II: Ostatnia krew (1994)
- Ptaszka (1994)
- Wyliczanka ("The Counting Rhyme") (1994)
- Deborah (1995)
- Pokuszenie ("Temptation") (1995)
- Prowokator (1995)
- Exit in Red (1996)
- Poznań 56 (1996)
- Fotoamator (1996)
- Bride of War (1996)
- Przystań ("The Harbour") (1997)
- Blood and Wine (1997)
- Sekal Has to Die (1997)
- Bastard (1997)
- Franciszkański spontan (1998)
- Złoto dezerterów ("The Deserters' Gold") (1998)
- Amok (1998)
- Nic ("Nothing") (1998)
- Jak narkotyk ("Like a Drug") (1999)
- Wszystkie pieniądze świata ("All the Money in the World) (1999)
- Zakochani (1999)
- The Spring to Come (2000)
- Żółty szalik ("A Yellow Scarf") (2000)
- Daleko od okna ("Far From the Window") (2000)
- Przeprowadzki (TV series, 2000)
- Cisza i ciemność ("Silence and Darkness") (2000)
- Słoneczna włócznia ("The Solar Spear") (2000)
- Dziewczyna z plakatu ("The Poster Girl") (2001)
- Listy miłosne ("Love Letters") (2001)
- Tam, gdzie żyją Eskimosi ("Where the Eskimo Live") (2001)
- Babie lato ("Indian Summer") (2002)
- Symetria ("The Symmetry") (2003)
- Żurek (2003)
- Piekło, niebo ("The Hell, the Heaven")(2004)
- Są takie świeżuteńkie dziewczynki (2004)
- Glina ("The Cop") (TV series, 2004–2008)
- Fale ("The Waves") (2005)
- Solidarność, Solidarność... (2005)
- Oficer (TV series, 2005)
- Statyści ("Extras") (2006)
- Wszystko będzie dobrze ("Everything Will Be Alright") (2007)
- Wino truskawkowe ("Strawberry Wine") (2008)
- Gry wojenne ("War Games") (TV series, 2008)
- Four Nights with Anna (2008)
- O rodzicach i dzieciach ("Of Parents and Children") (2008)
- Ojciec Mateusz (2008–2016)
- Wyłączność (2009)
- Mniejsze zło ("The Lesser Evil") (2009)
- Spokój w duszy (2009)
- Śluby panieńskie (2010)
- Syndrom (2010)
- Czarny czwartek ("Black Thursday") (2010)
- Little Rose (2010)
- Kołysanka (2010)
- La Prima notte della luna (2010)
- Jan Paweł II. Szukałem Was... (2011)
- W imieniu diabła ("In the Name of Devil") (2011)
- Komisarz Alex (2011–2012)
- Strażacy ("Firefighters") (2015)
- Historia Roja, czyli w ziemi lepiej słychać (2016)
- Smoleńsk (2016)
- A Prominent Patient (2016)
- Masaryk (2017)
- Psy 3. W imię zasad (2020)

== Selected awards and honours ==
- Nomination to the European Film Award for Best Composer for music to the film 300 Miles to Heaven (1989)
- Golden Lions Award at the Gdynia Film Festival for best music score to the film Psy (1992)
- Golden Lions Award at the Gdynia Film Festival for best music score to the film Prowokator (1995)
- Golden Lions Award at the Gdynia Film Festival for best music score to the film Bastard (1997)
- Special Award at the Camerimage Film Festival for the soundtrack to the film Nic (1998)
- Czech Lion Award for best soundtrack to the film Sekal Has to Die (1998)
- Grand Prix at the Bonn Film Music Festival for music composed to Nic ("Nothing") (1999)
- Golden Lions Award at the Gdynia Film Festival for best music score to the film Przedwiośnie ("The Spring to Come") (2001)
- Golden Lions Award at the Gdynia Film Festival for best music score to the film Wszystko będzie dobrze ("Everything Will Be Alright") (2007)
- Polish Film Award for best music score to the film Czarny czwartek. Janek wiśniewski padł (2011)
- Fryderyk Award for best music score to the film Czarny czwartek. Janek Wiśniewski padł (2012)
- Order of the White Eagle (2016)
- Czech Lion Award for best music score to the film A Prominent Patient (2017)
- Minister of Culture and National Heritage of Poland Award (2020)

== Quotes ==
"Film is the only inspiration and ultimate goal for me. I do not compose any other music. It turned out that my gift for composing is limited to the cinema. I don't know what kind of feelings I should evoke in audiences in concert halls." (Michał Lorenc)

"You don't compose music for a film but for SOMEBODY. The same film, if made by a different man, would have a completely different music." (Michał Lorenc)

== Trivia ==
- The song Elena's Dance ("Taniec Eleny") from the original soundtrack to Maciej Dejczer's 1997 film Bastard composed by Lorenc was used by Romanian artistic gymnast Sandra Izbașa in her floor exercise routine at the 2008 Summer Olympics where she won gold medal. Slovak figure skater Zuzana Babiaková also used the track for her free skating program at the 2002 Winter Olympics.
- Elena's Dance is used by the Widzew Łódź football club when its players enter the pitch during home games at Stadion Widzewa in Łódź. In 2017, during the opening ceremony of the newly reconstructed stadium, Lorenc formally granted the rights to perform the song to the club's owners.
- The magazine Variety compared Michal Lorenc's music to the works of a prominent American composer - Aaron Copland.
- In 2010, Lorenc became one of members of the committee supporting Jarosław Kaczyński in the 2010 Polish Presidential Elections.

== See also ==
- Polish composers
- film music
- Jan A.P. Kaczmarek
- Wojciech Kilar
- Blood and Wine
