= Zieliński brothers escape =

Escape from Poland to Sweden

In 1985, two teenage brothers from the village of Żyraków (at the Wisłoka river, near Dębica), southeastern Poland, decided to flee Communist-controlled Poland. Hidden under a TIR truck, they managed to get to Sweden. Four years later, Polish movie director Maciej Dejczer, together with Cezary Harasimowicz (they co-wrote the screenplay) made a film 300 Miles to Heaven, which is based on the boys’ escape, with some facts, including details of the escape, changed.

== Introduction ==
15-year-old Adam Zieliński and 13-year-old Krzysztof Zieliński were typical Polish teenagers. The older one was interested in birds, his younger brother dreamed about being a piano player. Neither saw any future in the 1980s, crisis-stricken country. They wanted to escape to the United States, to help their parents, who were supporting eight children. In 1985 Adam just started high school in Dębica, and Krzysztof attended the seventh-grade of the elementary school.

== Train journey ==
In October 1985 the brothers left their family home in Żyraków, without telling their parents. Later, their mother found a letter, in which the boys assured her that they had always loved her and felt good at home, but there were other reasons for the escape. Also, the teenagers asked their parents not to inform the milicja for at least a few days.

The brothers boarded a night express train to Warsaw. As the train was carrying drunken soldiers, nobody showed interest in the two teenagers travelling by themselves. Krzysztof later admitted that their original plan was to secretly board an airplane to the United States. In the morning they reached Warsaw and went to Okęcie airport, but it was surrounded by soldiers and patrol dogs, so they gave up and changed plans. However, they knew about ferries cruising between the Baltic Sea ports of Świnoujście and Ystad in Sweden. Thus, they boarded another train, from Warsaw to Szczecin, and then to Świnoujście.

== Across the Baltic sea ==
After arriving at Świnoujście, the teenagers went to see the ferry port and a parking lot, with several trucks, waiting for a journey to Sweden. They decided to get under a trailer of one of the trucks.

At the port, they caught attention of a soldier of the Wojska Ochrony Pogranicza (Border Defence Troops, WOP). He checked Adam Zieliński's ID, and asked the brothers what they were doing. Unconvinced by the answer, the soldiers ordered the boys to get into a train and return to their hometown. However, the train stopped after a while and the teenagers jumped out of it, returning to the parking lot.

Soon afterwards, they found a truck with Polish licence plates, hid under the trailer and spent the whole night there. The truck started next day at noon and entered a line of vehicles, waiting to embark on the ferry. According to Krzysztof Zieliński, patrol dogs were sick on that day, which was a great relief for the escapees. Also, even though a customs officer checked the chassis with a flashlight, he failed to notice the frightened boys. Then the truck drove off, to stop again. After a final checkout of the cargo, the vehicle drove onto the ferry.

The boys stayed all the time under the truck, even though they were hungry and cold. After a few hours the ferry landed in Swedish port of Ystad. The truck left the boat and parked on a lot. Zieliński brothers took advantage of it and fled. Krzysztof later stated that they had no idea where they were. However, soon afterwards they saw Western-made cars and colorful stores, full of merchandise. This was a stark contrast to the 1980s, drab reality of Poland.

== In Sweden ==
Krzysztof Zieliński recalled that they were walking along the streets of Ystad, when they were approached by a policeman. As they did not speak Swedish, they were taken to a station, where an interpreter appeared. The brothers stated they wanted to apply for an asylum. The Swedish government twice denied it, but in the meantime Polish immigrants, members of the Solidarity movement, organized a press campaign. Furthermore, the Polish government in reprisal deprived their parents custody of the teenagers. Eventually, the Swedish government relented and placed the boys first in a refugee camp and later with a Polish-Swedish family.

Currently, Adam Zieliński, a graduate of a technical college, lives in Vetlanda with a Polish wife and two children. His younger brother studied chemistry, but graduated in economics. The brothers often travelled to Poland to visit their family. In 2009 Krzysztof returned to Poland for good; he married the Polish actress Magdalena Smalara (pl) and resides in Warsaw with her and their son.

== Sources ==
- Interview with Krzysztof Zielinski, on which most of the article was based
- A scene from the film
