= Francis de Sales Lewental =

Polish Jewish publisher

Francis de Sales Lewental (1839 in Włocławek, Congress Poland – 24 September 1902 at Wiesbaden) was a Polish Jewish publisher. In 1862 Lewental, the son of poor Jewish parents, bought with his accumulated savings the press of the Warsaw publisher Jan Glücksberg (died 1859), and began his career with the Kalendarz Ludowy, a popular almanac, which he continued until 1866.

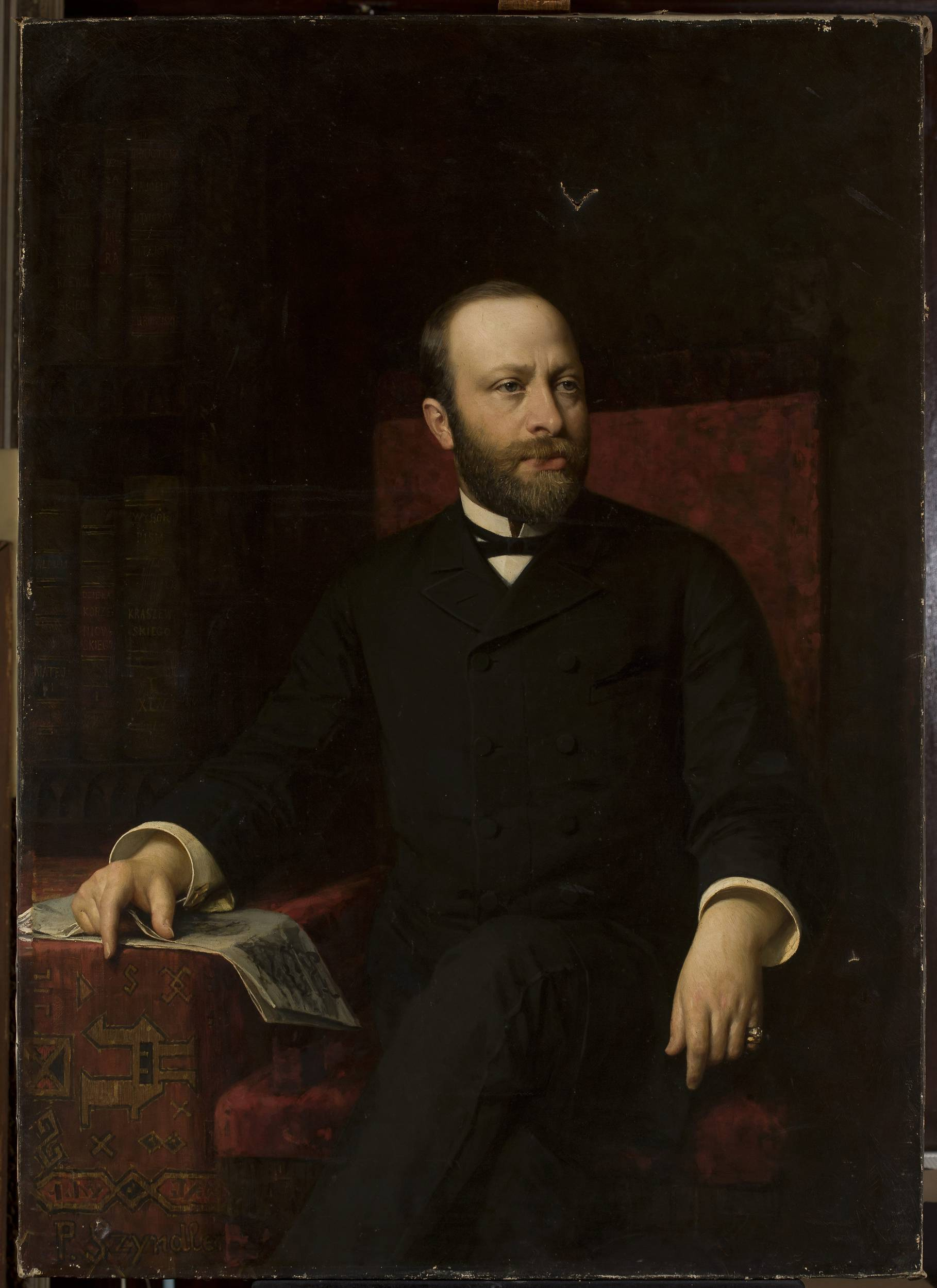

In 1865, in conjunction with others, he founded Kłosy, an illustrated weekly, which in the next year became his exclusive property. Under Lewental's management and under the editorship of Adam Plug, Kłosy became the most widely circulated illustrated weekly in Poland, and contributed in no small measure to the popularizing of Polish art and to the development of Polish wood engraving. In 1871 Lewental bought the Kółko Domowe, a home magazine, and transformed it into the popular Tygodnik Romansów i Powieści (discontinued in 1900). Lewental was the proprietor also of the Świt, edited for a few years by Maria Konopnicka. In 1871, also, he issued an edition of the works of Korzeniowski (better-known in the English-speaking world as the father of Joseph Conrad), which proved so popular that it led later to similar editions of the works of Kraszewski, Kremer, Rzewuski, Skarbek, Fredro, Syrokomla, Eliza Orzeszkowa, Kaczkowski, Bałucki, etc.

In 1874 Lewental commenced the publication of the best productions of European literature under the title "Biblioteka Najcelniejszych Utworow Literatury Europejskiej." They were edited with the greatest care by Piotr Chmielowski and, after him, by Stanisław Krzemiński. The John Matejko Album and many other well-known works were issued from his press. In 1887 Lewental became one of the proprietors of the Kurier Warszawski. Though he avoided politics he did not succeed in escaping a conflict with the Russian government; he was arrested in 1900, was compelled to discontinue all his publications, and was sentenced to deportation for three years to Odessa. After a year there he obtained a passport for foreign travel. Lewental enjoyed the friendship of many literati, among them being J. I. Kraszewski, for whose release from imprisonment at Magdeburg he offered to furnish the bail required by the Prussian government.
