= List of 1980 films based on actual events =

This is a list of films and miniseries released in 1980 that are based on actual events. All films on this list are from American production unless indicated otherwise.

== 1980 ==
- A Rumor of War (1980) – war drama miniseries based on the 1977 autobiography by Philip Caputo about his service in the United States Marine Corps in the early years of American involvement in the Vietnam War
- A Time for Miracles (1980) – biographical drama television film chronicling the life story of America's first native born saint, Elizabeth Ann Bayley Seton
- Act of Love (1980) – drama television film concerning a man performing euthanasia on his paralyzed brother, based on a true story
- Attica (1980) – prison drama television film depicting the events leading up to and during the 1971 Attica Correctional Facility riot and the aftermath
- The Big Red One (1980) – epic war film based on Samuel Fuller's own experiences as a soldier in World War II
- Breaker Morant (1980) – Australian war drama film concerning the 1902 court martial of lieutenants Harry Morant, Peter Handcock and George Witton—one of the first war crime prosecutions in British military history
- Brubaker (1980) – prison drama film detailing Murton's uncovering of the 1967 prison scandal
- Burebista (1980) – Romanian biographical drama film about the life of the ancient Dacian king Burebista, depicting his battle to unify his nation and to resist Roman incursions
- Can't Stop the Music (1980) – musical comedy film about the 1970s disco group the Village People loosely based on the actual story of how the group formed
- Céleste (1980) – West German biographical drama film about the life of the French writer Marcel Proust as he lay in his bed from 1912 to 1922; the story is told through the eyes of his real life maid, Céleste Albaret
- Coal Miner's Daughter (1980) – biographical musical drama film following the story of country music singer Loretta Lynn from her early teen years in a poor family and getting married at 15 to her rise as one of the most influential country musicians
- The Coffin Affair (French: L'Affaire Coffin) (1980) – Canadian French-language crime drama film depicting a dramatization of the Coffin affair of 1953
- Concert at the End of Summer (Czech: Koncert na konci léta) (1980) – Czechoslovak historical biographical drama film depicting the life of Antonín Dvořák
- Death of a Princess (1980) – British biographical drama television film based on the true story of Princess Mishaal, a young Saudi Arabian princess and her lover who had been publicly executed for adultery
- The Diary of Anne Frank (1980) – biographical drama television film based on the writings from the diary kept by Anne Frank while she was in hiding for two years with her family during the Nazi occupation of the Netherlands
- Egon Schiele: Excess and Punishment (German: Egon Schiele – Exzess und Bestrafung) (1980) – West German-Austrian-French biographical drama film based on the life of the Austrian artist Egon Schiele
- Eleftherios Venizelos (Greek: Ελευθέριος Βενιζέλος) (1980) – Greek biographical drama film about one of the most famous leaders of the Greek political scene of the 20th century, Eleftherios Venizelos
- The Elephant Man (1980) – biographical drama film about Joseph Merrick, a severely deformed man in late 19th-century London
- The Fiancee (German: Die Verlobte) (1980) – East German drama film about the resistance of the communist Hella Lindau and her fiancé Hermann Reimers against the Nazis
- Fighting Back: The Rocky Bleier Story (1980) – biographical sport drama television film about the life of Pittsburgh Steelers running back Rocky Bleier
- Flame Top (Finnish: Tulipää) (1980) – Finnish drama film depicting the life of the writer Algot Untola
- Gauguin the Savage (1980) – biographical drama television film depicting the life of the artist Paul Gauguin
- Gideon's Trumpet (1980) – historical drama television film depicting the historical events before and during the 1963 United States Supreme Court case of Gideon v. Wainwright that brought the right of an attorney to criminal defendants who could not afford it and did not meet special requirements to get one for free
- Guyana Tragedy: The Story of Jim Jones (1980) – biographical drama miniseries about the Peoples Temple led by Jim Jones, and their 1978 mass suicide at Jonestown
- Haywire (1980) – biographical drama television film based on the memoir by Brooke Hayward
- Heart Beat (1980) – romantic drama film about seminal figures in the Beat Generation
- Heaven's Gate (1980) – Western epic drama film based on the Johnson County War revolving around a dispute between land barons and European immigrants in Wyoming in the 1890s
- Hide in Plain Sight (1980) – drama film based on an actual case from the files of New York attorney Salvatore R. Martoche who represented Tom Leonard, a real-life Buffalo, New York, victim who had sued to recover contact with his children estranged by the culpability of the new husband and government, soon realizing his own past is coming back to get him
- The Hunter (1980) – biographical action thriller film about bounty hunter Ralph "Papa" Thorson
- The Idolmaker (1980) – musical drama film loosely based on the life of rock promoter/producer Bob Marcucci who discovered, among others, Frankie Avalon and Fabian
- The Jayne Mansfield Story (1980) – biographical drama television film based on the life of Jayne Mansfield
- Joni (1980) – biographical drama film depicting the true story of Joni Eareckson Tada, a seventeen-year-old girl who becomes paralyzed after a diving accident
- The Lady Banker (French: La Banquière) (1980) – French comedy drama film about Emma Eckhert, a French woman from a modest background, who became a big sensation between 1914 and 1938 as a banker and the head of a financial paper specialized in public savings
- The Last Bell (Bengali: ছুটির ঘণ্টা) (1980) – Bangladeshi Bengali-language drama film based on the true story of a twelve-year-old school boy named Khokon in Bangladesh, who starved to death after the washroom he was in was mistakenly closed by the caretaker the day before the Muslim vacation Eid-ul-Azha started
- The Last Outlaw (1980) – Australian biographical drama miniseries based on the life of Ned Kelly
- The Legend of Alfred Packer (1980) – Western biographical film about Alferd Packer
- Lion of the Desert (1980) – American-Libyan epic historical war film about the Second Italo-Senussi War
- The Long Riders (1980) – Western crime drama film about the life and exploits of the Jesse James Gang
- The Man with the Carnation (Greek: Ο άνθρωπος με το γαρύφαλλο) (1980) – Greek drama film dealing with the arrest, trial and execution of the Greek Communist Nikos Belogiannis and his associates in 1951–1952
- Marilyn: The Untold Story (1980) – biographical drama television film about the life of the 1950s sex symbol-movie star, Marilyn Monroe
- The Mark of the Beast (Dutch: Het teken van het beest) (1980) – Dutch drama film based on the life of IJje Wijkstra who in 1929 murdered four police officers
- McVicar (1980) – British crime drama film based on the life of 1960s armed robber and later writer John McVicar
- Navajeros (1980) – Spanish-Mexican action drama film following the misadventures of the real life of José Joaquín Sánchez Frutos, aka "El Jaro"
- Nijinsky (1980) – biographical drama film exploring the later life and career of Vaslav Nijinsky
- The Ordeal of Dr. Mudd (1980) – historical drama television film revolving around the 1865 assassination of Abraham Lincoln
- Oppenheimer (1980) – biographical drama miniseries based on the life and career of American theoretical physicist J. Robert Oppenheimer
- Playing for Time (1980) – drama television film based on Fénelon's experience as a female prisoner in the Auschwitz concentration camp, where she and a group of classical musicians were spared in return for performing music for their captors
- Raging Bull (1980) – biographical sport drama film following the career former middleweight boxing champion Jake LaMotta, his rise and fall in the boxing scene, and his turbulent personal life beset by rage and jealousy
- Rape and Marriage: The Rideout Case (1980) – drama television film based on the true story of the trial of John Rideout, who was accused of raping his wife Greta in Oregon, 1978
- The Scarlett O'Hara War (1980) – drama television film about the search for the actress to play Scarlett O'Hara in the much anticipated film adaptation of Gone with the Wind (1939)
- The Sea Wolves (1980) – war drama film telling the true story of Operation Creek during the Second World War
- The Secret of Nikola Tesla (Serbo-Croatian: Tajna Nikole Tesle) (1980) – Yugoslav biographical drama film dramatizing events in the life of the Serbian-American engineer and inventor Nikola Tesla
- Solo Sunny (1980) – East German musical drama film inspired by German singer named Sanije Torka who was born of eastern European immigrant parents
- Sophia Loren: Her Own Story (1980) – biographical drama television film depicting a dramatization of the life of Italian actress Sophia Loren from her childhood in Naples to her international stardom
- Tom Horn (1980) – Western biographical drama film based on the writings of legendary lawman, outlaw, and gunfighter Tom Horn
- Where the Buffalo Roam (1980) – biographical comedy film depicting author Hunter S. Thompson's rise to fame in the 1970s and his relationship with Chicano attorney and activist Oscar "Zeta" Acosta
- The Youth of Peter the Great (Russian: Юность Петра) (1980) – Soviet biographical drama film based on the early life of Peter the Great
