= Piotr Uklański =

Polish-American artist

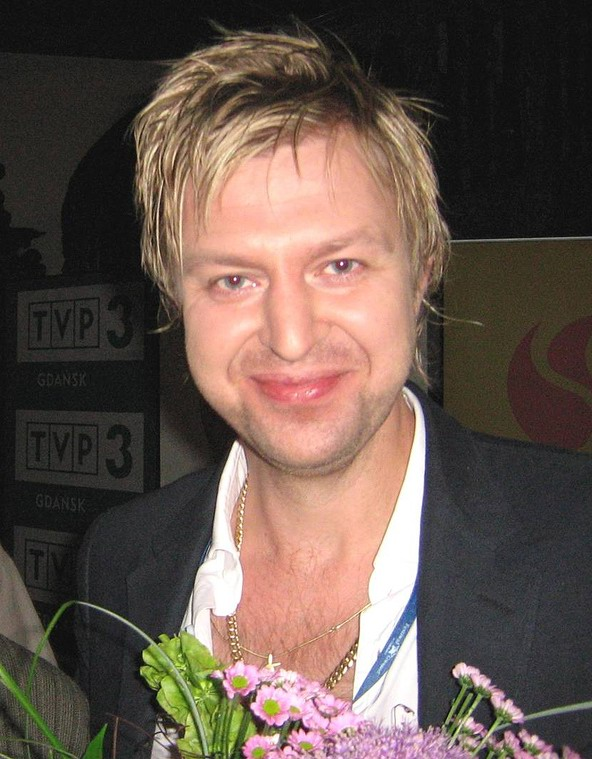
- Born: 1968 (age 57–58); Warsaw, Poland
- Education: Academy of Fine Arts in Warsaw
- Occupations: Artist, director, photographer
- Notable work: The Nazis (1998); Untitled (John Paul II) (2004)
- Partner: Alison Gingeras

Piotr Uklański (born 1968) is a Polish-American contemporary artist, director and photographer who has produced art since the mid 1990s which have explored themes of spectacle, cliché, and tropes of modern art. Many of his pieces and projects take well-known, overused, sometimes sentimental subjects and tropes and both embraces and subverts them. Untitled (Dance Floor) (1996) is one of his best known works which took a minimalist grid floor in the gallery and developed it into a disco dance floor activated with sound and lit with bright colors. His works have been featured at the Museum of Modern Art in New York, Migros Museum of Contemporary Art in Zurich, Museum of Modern and Contemporary Art in Strasbourg, and Whitney Museum of American Art in New York.

== Early work and influences ==
Piotr Uklański is from Warsaw, Poland, where he received his Bachelor of Fine Arts at the Academy of Fine Arts. He later moved to New York where he studied photography at Cooper Union and received his Masters in Fine Arts in 1995 When he first arrived in New York, he explains how he first became interested in photography,

"I studied painting, but in the evenings I was doing performances. The performances, at the time, I was interested in for photographs. It was sort of like I was creating an image in the performance, and that in some way led me to my interest in photography. And interestingly, I would dog sit, I had to make money. I lived in New York, I didn't have any support, I was the classic 'got off the plane to go to school.' So I worked in the studios, and I think the two collided. With people, like Guy Bourdin—at the time I did not know who Guy Bourdin was—you realize that you can work in the commercial world of photography and still make art. That's what I was aiming at. That's not exactly how I ended up supporting myself as an artist, but that was the interest that I took when it came to photography."

One of his early works, The Nazis (1999), was shown at The Photographers' Gallery in London and lead to controversy as it displayed photographs of actors who had portrayed Nazis in film. Several works from the collection were destroyed and the exhibition was closed down.

== Materials and style ==
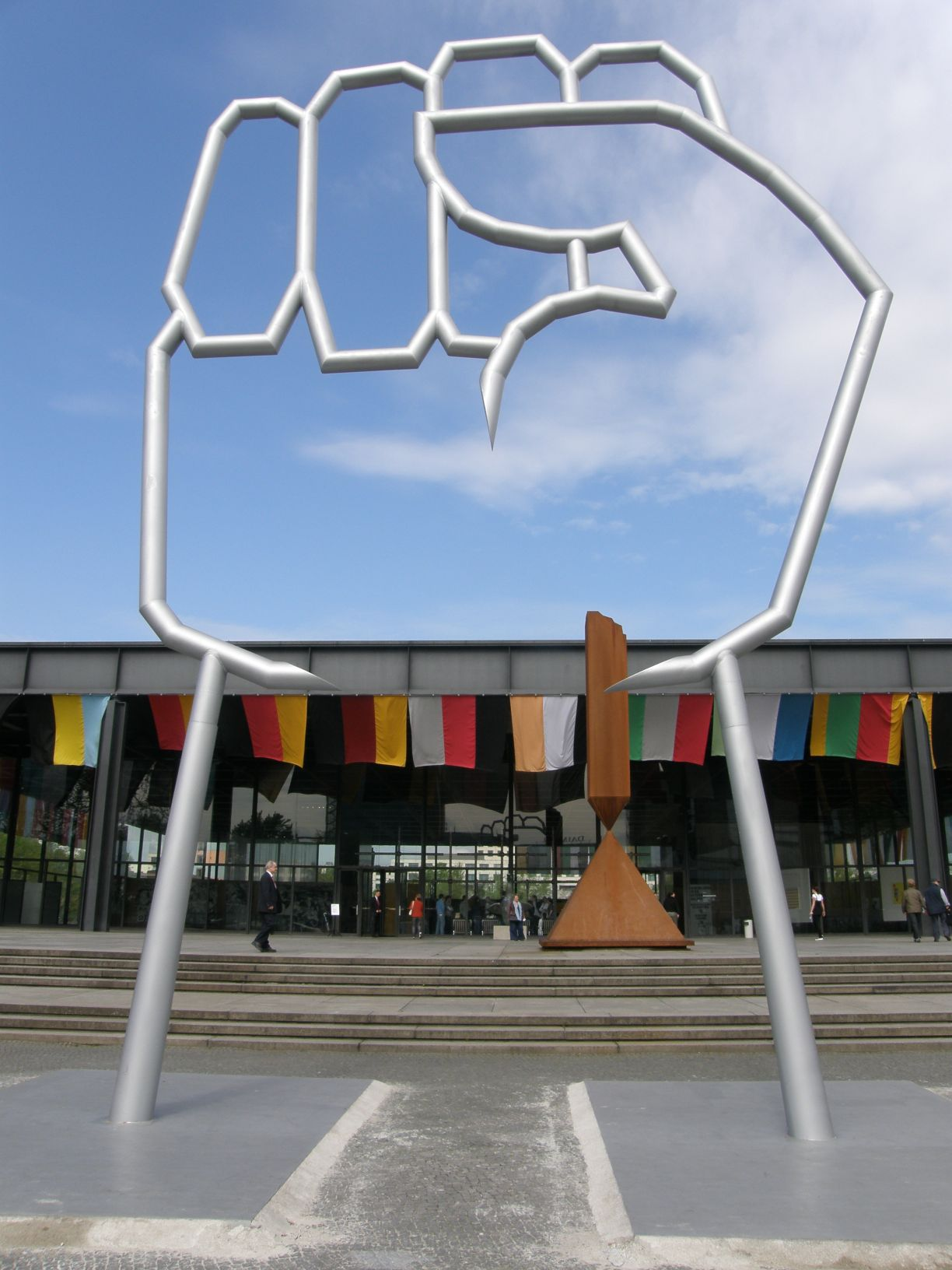
Untitled (Fist) (2008) Installed in front of the building of the Neue Nationalgalerie in Berlin

Uklański uses a variety of media, mediums, and materials, including paintings, collage, fiber, art, installation, and photography. Photography can be considered his primary media, but the materials in his art range from resin paintings, collage, linen, plant fiber, and aluminium, to pencil shavings, colored graphite, and ceramics. Uklański has also released a feature film called Summer Love: The First Polish Western. His works have been displayed in galleries and well-known museums around the world; he has also created public works such as billboards and graffiti.

Uklański uses unconventional materials by weaving them together or finding other means to adhere them to each other or to canvas. He has attempted work by "painting without a brush" using oil and canvas. Untitled (Dance Floor) 1996 is a functioning floor composed of sound-activated boxes which light up, reminiscent of a minimalist grid and disco dancefloor.

The style of Uklański's work is as wide-ranging as his use of materials. His work has challenged societal views on death and sex, and also often explores political movements as they intersect with society and media. An example is his work, The Nazis (1998), in which he displays movie stills of well-known actors playing Nazis, with color and contrast changes in the style of Andy Warhol's Marilyn Monroe (Marilyn) 1967. In his 2015 exhibitions at the Metropolitan Museum of Art, Fatal Attraction: Piotr Uklański Photographs, and Fatal Attraction: Piotr Uklański Selects from the Met Collection, Uklański's styles were distinct both in his own work, and through the generally shocking choices of photographs he collected from the museum's archives. Some of his pieces, like Untitled (Dance Floor) 1996 and Untitled (The Nazis) 1998 are clean and neat, whereas others like Untitled (Story of the Eye) 2013 are messy, overflowing, or frayed. One of his sculptures, Untitled (Polonia) (2005), is minimalist but monumental, made of glass, and stands as a response to a political event.

== Major works ==
=== Dance Floor ===
Created in 1996, this installation piece is composed of glass, an aluminum-raised floor structure and computer-controlled LED and sound system. It is a fully functioning disco dance floor with synchronized music. It creates an atmosphere for social interaction where the viewers complete the piece. Uklański stated that he wanted to create a work whose goal was to give the viewer pleasure.

=== The Nazis ===
Created in 1998, this was an exhibition of 164 color photographs of Polish and other foreign actors who played Nazis in film. The point of this collection, according to Uklański, is to question how the attractive actors seduce the viewer and blind them to the truth about the evil and ruthlessness of Nazism.

"The portrait of a Nazi in mass culture is the most prominent example of how the truth about history, about people is distorted. This is all the more important to me in that this is the main source of information about those times, and for many people – the only one."

In 2000, it was exhibited at the Zachęta National Gallery of Art in Warsaw. The exhibition was eventually closed down, and some of the works were destroyed as a result of scandal that erupted after the exhibition. Daniel Olbrychski was the person who damaged it with a sabre as he was among the actors featured in this work. It was one of the events that led to the resignation of the museum's director, Anda Rottenberg. Uklański has since stated, "I don’t really understand why anyone would see this work as controversial. ... It’s not abusing anybody, it’s just things that are picked out from the world out there."

=== The Joy of Photography ===
Uklański's long running project takes well known photography subjects such as landscapes, flora, etc, which were included in the project's namesake, Eastman Kodak's 1991 guidebook for photography, and "explores clichés of popular photography using the kitschy subjects and hackneyed effects" to "provide witty commentary—from a European perspective—on how Americans approach even their moments of pleasure as forms of work and self-improvement."

=== Second Languages: Reading Piotr Uklański ===
Emerging in the mid-1990s, the Warsaw-born, New York-based artist Piotr Uklański has created a provocative body of work that ranges across media, from installation, paper reliefs, tie-dye paintings, textile-based immersive sculptures and resin-based sculptures and paintings to photography, performance and a feature-length film, Summer Love. Second Languages is the first book to offer a comprehensive look at this iconoclastic artist. Taking the form of a reader, this richly illustrated collection of 11 essays—authored by internationally renowned art historians, curators and critics—analyzes Uklanski's protean output. While this book serves to critically situate Uklański's work in art historical and theoretical contexts, it also provides some unconventional, humorous interpretations. Published by Hatje Cantz, 2014. Edited by Donna Wingate.

== Personal life ==
He is married to curator Alison Gingeras whom he featured in a photograph as a part of his collection titled Fatal Attraction: Piotr Uklański Photographs.

== Exhibition history ==
=== Selected solo exhibitions ===
- 1993 – Pojedynek w pojedynke / Dueling Alone, BWA Gallery, Sandomierz
- 1995 – Zycie jakie powinno byc / Life As It Should Be, Grodzka Gallery, Lublin
- 1998 – More Joy of Photography, Gavin Brown's Enterprise, New York
- 1999 – The Nazis, Photographer's Gallery, London
- 1999 – Peace, Museum fur Gegenwartskunst, Zurich
- 2000 – A Norwegian Photograph, Fotogalleriet, Oslo
- 2004 – Piotr Uklański- Earth, Wind and Fire, Kunsthalle, Basel
- 2005 – Polonia, Emmanuel Perrotin Gallery, Paris
- 2007 – A Retrospective, Vienna Secession, Vienna
- 2008 – White – Red, Gagosian Gallery, New York
- 2008 – Expanding the Frame Film Series, Walker Art Center, Minneapolis, USA
- 2009 – Brut, Gagosian Gallery, London
- 2010 – The Year We Make Contact – Taduesz Kantor and Piotr Uklański, Art Stations Foundation, Poznan
- 2011 – Discharge, Gagosian Gallery, New York
- 2012 – Forty and Four, Zacheta Galeria Narodowa Sztuki, Warsaw
- 2014 – Piotr Uklański: Floored, Gagosian Gallery, New York
- 2015 – Fatal Attraction: Piotr Uklański Photographs, Metropolitan Museum of Art, New York

=== Selected group exhibitions ===
- 1996 – Contemporary Art of Central Europe & Japan, Beam Gallery, Tokyo
- 1996 – Departure Lounge, P.S.1 Museum, New York
- 1997 – Assuming Positions, Institute of Contemporary Art, London
- 1998 – Manifesta 2, Casino Museum, Luxembourg
- 1998 – I love NY, Museum Ludwig, Cologne
- 2000/2001 – Let's Entertain, Walker Art Center, Minneapolis; Portland Art Museum, Portland; Musee National d' Art Moderne, Centre Georges Pompidou, Paris; Museo Rufino Tamayo, Mexico City; Miami Art Museum, Florida
- 2002 – Art Biennale in Tirana
- 2003 – International Art Biennale in Venice
- 2004 – International Art Biennale in São Paulo
- 2005 – Art Biennnale in Lyon
- 2008 – 5th Biennale in Berlin
- 2009 – Remembering Henry's Show. Selected works 1978-200, The Brant Foundation Art Study Center, Greenwich, USA
- 2009 – Meet Me Inside, Gagosian Gallery, Beverly Hills, USA
- 2010 – Whitney Biennal, The Whitney Museum of American Art, New York
- 2010 – Busan Biennale, Busan, Korea
