= Pedro I el Cruel (TV series) =

Spanish drama series

- Genre: Historical drama Biographical
- Screenplay by: Graciela Sáenz de Heredia
- Directed by: Francisco Abad
- Country of origin: Spain
- Original language: Spanish
- No. of seasons: 1
- No. of episodes: 10

Production
- Running time: 50 min (approx.)

Original release
- Network: TVE1
- Release: 9 January – 20 January 1989

Pedro I el Cruel is a Spanish limited drama television series directed by Francisco Abad and written by Graciela Sáenz de Heredia about the life of Peter I of Castile, also called "Peter the Cruel". It aired on TVE1 in January 1989.

== Cast ==
- Ramón Madaula as Peter the Cruel.
- Marisa de Leza as Queen Mother of Castile.
- Juan Luis Galiardo.
- José Luis Pellicena.
- Fernando Guillén.
- Jaime Blanch.
- Fernando Cebrián.
- Lluís Homar.
- José Sancho.
- Jesús Ruimán as Henry of Trastámara.

== Production and release ==
Pedro I el Cruel was directed by Francisco Abad whereas the screenplay was authored by Graciela Sáenz de Heredia. The series, one of the several biographical miniseries released by the Spanish public broadcaster in the 1980s, had a 200 million peseta budget, an amount described as "cheap" by the director. The series was shot in 1988 in different locations including the Castle of Peñafiel. It premiered on 9 January 1989 on TVE. The broadcasting run of the 10-episode miniseries ended on 20 January 1989.

Series	Episodes	Originally released		
Series	Episodes	First released	Last released	Network
1	10	9 January 1989	20 January 1989	tve1
