= 89mm from Europe =

1993 film

- Directed by: Marcel Łoziński
- Written by: Marcel Łoziński
- Cinematography: Jacek Petrycki; Arthur Reinhart
- Edited by: Katarzyna Maciejko-Kowalczyk
- Production company: Studio Filmowe Kalejdoskop
- Distributed by: Telewizja Polska
- Release date: 1993
- Running time: 12 minutes
- Country: Poland
- Language: Russian

89mm from Europe (Polish: 89 mm od Europy) is a 1993 Polish short documentary film directed by Marcel Łoziński, looking at the 89 mm difference in track gauge between Russian and European railroads after the Cold War. It was nominated for an Academy Award for Best Documentary Short.

== Plot ==
The film shows the fundamental differences between Western and Eastern Europe even after the end of the Cold War, based on one detail: the width of the railroad tracks. 89 mm from Europe shows the efforts of Belarusian workers who collectively replace the wheels of trains passing through the former Soviet Union on the Polish-Belarusian border near Brest. The title 89 mm is the difference between the track gauge in Europe (1435 mm) and in the former USSR (1524 mm), with a historical explanation dating back to the 19th century; a different gauge was to prevent German military trains from quickly penetrating the borders of Tsarist Russia.

== Awards ==
89 mm from Europe was the first film by Łoziński in which he really reached an international audience after the fall of the Eastern Bloc. The documentary was nominated for an Oscar for the best short documentary and for the European Film Awards for the best documentary, it also won the Grand Prix of the Montreal Film Festival.

== Accolades ==
- Academy Award for Best Documentary (Short Subject) nomination
- European Film Award for Best Documentary Special Mention
