= 300 Miles to Heaven =

- Directed by: Maciej Dejczer
- Screenplay by: Cezary Harasimowicz; Maciej Dejczer
- Starring: Jadwiga Jankowska-Cieślak; Andrzej Mellin; Wojciech Klata; Rafał Zimowski; Kama Kowalewska; Peter Steen
- Cinematography: Krzysztof Ptak
- Music by: Michał Lorenc
- Release date: 30 October 1989
- Running time: 90 minutes
- Countries: Poland; Denmark; France
- Language: Polish

300 Miles to Heaven (Polish: 300 mil do nieba) is a 1989 Polish drama film directed by Maciej Dejczer. It is based on the true story of the Zieliński brothers, two teenagers who escaped from Communist Poland in 1985.

The film received the European Film Award in 1989.

== Plot synopsis ==
In a working-class village near Kielce, Poland, the Kwiatkowski family live in poverty. The two oldest sons, sixth-grader Andrzej "Jędrek" Kwiatkowski and first-grader Grzegorz "Grześ" Kwiatkowski dream of escaping to the West in pursuit of better living conditions and opportunities, as well as to financially aid their dissident parents. Grześ wishes to escape to Louisiana in the United States to pursue a music career. The boys' dream is also shared by Jędrek's classmate, Elka, who often lives alone due to her father's alcoholism and repeated incarceration.

One night, the three children act on their escape plan by hiding underneath a freight truck. However, the plan goes awry and only Grześ is able to hide in the trailer on time before the truck takes off. Elka steals a nearby motorcycle and she and Jędrek give chase before crashing into a ditch. Elka is injured and taken to a hospital, guarded by a policeman who is searching for Jędrek. The boy sneaks into the hospital and helps Elka to escape, but her injuries slow her down and she encourages Jędrek to leave without her. Jędrek promises to come back for her as he runs in the direction of where the truck had travelled.

The freight truck stops beside a highway and Grześ remains in the trailer. Jędrek is arrested during his pursuit and placed in the back of a police car; the driving policemen look for the truck in which Grześ escaped in. The policemen find the vehicle and do not notice Jędrek sneaking out of the car and reuniting with his brother. The boys spend the next couple of days uncomfortably hiding in the trailer as the truck drives through mud and rain. The truck soon ends up on a ferry and Grześ complains of hunger and thirst; Jędrek finds cans of beer in an unlocked van parked nearby.

The brothers later wake up at a gas station in a foreign country. After going to the bathroom, the truck drives away, leaving them stranded. They sleep at a railway station where two police officers wake them up and ask what they are doing; with his limited English, Jędrek is able to establish that he and his brother are in Denmark. The officers place them in a refugee camp as the boys wish to apply for asylum.

The brothers' case makes international news and they are befriended by a Polish journalist who had similarly left Poland some time before. Back home, the boys' mother and father lose their parental rights after being declared as "incapable of taking care of their children". On their own with little support, Jędrek and Grześ unsuccessfully look for work. Later, they receive a government allowance; the boys send some of the money to their parents.

On Christmas Day, the journalist arranges a telephone call between the boys and their parents. They assure each other of their well-being and tearfully express their love for each other. Jędrek asks about Elka, to which his mother informs him that she has been sent to a reformatory. When Jędrek asks if the brothers should stay in Denmark or go back home to Poland, their father encourages them to stay, shouting "Don't ever come back! Do you hear me?"

The film concludes with the brothers sitting mournfully at a public fountain, uncertain of their future in Denmark.

== Cast ==
- Wojciech Klata – Grześ
- Rafał Zimowski – Jędrek
- Kama Kowalewska – Elka
- Jadwiga Jankowska-Cieślak – The Mother
- Andrzej Mellin – The Father
- Adrianna Biedrzyńska – Journalist
- Kama Kowalewska – Elka
- Aleksander Bednarz – Teacher
- Krzysztof Stroiński – Zdzisio, Elka's Father
