= Florian Czarnyszewicz =

Belarus-born Polish writer

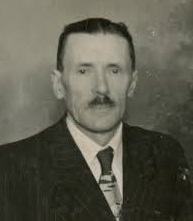
Florian Czarnyszewicz

Florian Czarnyszewicz (2 June 1900, Pereseka, near Babrujsk – 18 August 1964, Villa Carlos Paz) - was a Polish writer.

Born in a minor local Catholic szlachta family, he participated in the Polish–Soviet War in 1919-1920. As a result of the war, his home region in Eastern Belarus remained under Soviet control as the Belarusian SSR. In 1924, he emigrated to Argentina where he worked in a slaughterhouse in Berisso. He later constructed a house in Villa Carlos Paz. Aerosmith singer Steven Tyler is Florian Czarnyszewicz's great nephew through Florian's brother Feliks.

== Novels ==
- 1942 - Nadberezyńcy (Berezina people)
- 1953 - Wicik Żywica
- 1958 - Losy pasierbów
- 1963 - Chłopcy z Nowoszyszek (Boys from Nowoszyszki)
