= Jacek Petrycki =

Polish cinematographer, screenwriter, and film director (born 1948)

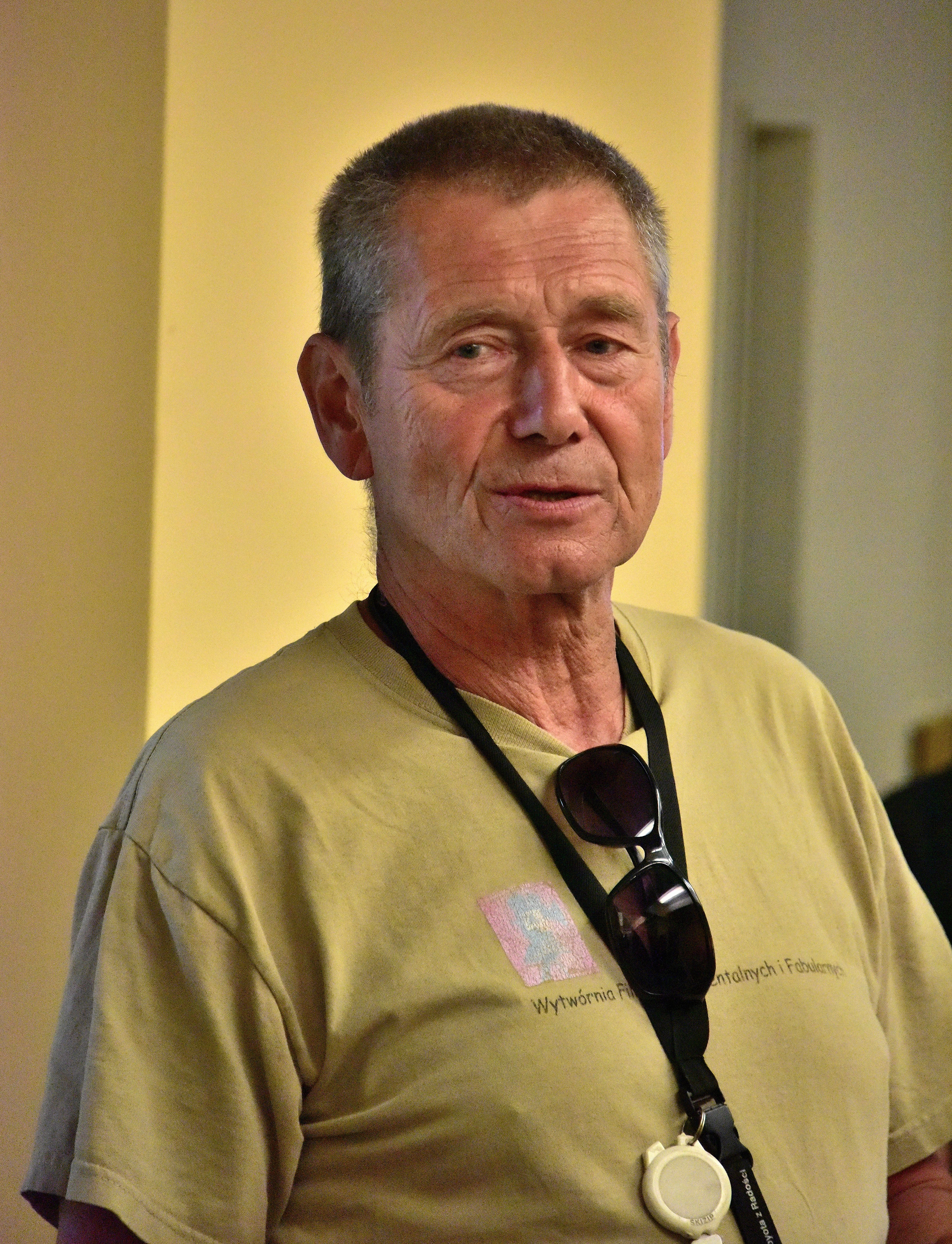
- Jacek Petrycki, 2017
- Born: 1 December 1948 (age 77); Poznań
- Citizenship: Polish
- Occupations: cinematographer film director

Jacek Petrycki (born 1 December 1948) is a cinematographer, screenwriter and film director.

== Biography ==
The son of cinematographer Roman Petrycki, grandson of Józef Petrycki, nephew of Bolesław Petrycki (on his father's side) and of Stanisław Groński (on his mother's side)

In 1970 he graduated in cinematography from the Łódź Film School; he obtained diploma in 1976. Since 1987, he has collaborated with British television channels Channel 4 and the BBC. In 2023 he obtained doctorate in art at the Łódź Film School.

== Filmography ==
=== Director of photography ===
- The Calm (1976)
- Coś za coś (1977)
- Provincial Actors (1979)
- Camera Buff (1979)
- Gadające głowy (1980)
- Fever (1981)
- A Lonely Woman (1981)
- Interrogation (1982)
- Cyrk odjeżdża (1987)
- Europa Europa (1990)
- 89mm from Europe (1993)
- Człowiek wózków (2000)
- Julie Walking Home (2002)
- The Call of the Toad (2005)
- Summer Love (2006)
- Boisko bezdomnych (2008)
- Operacja Dunaj (2009)
- Czarny czwartek. Janek Wiśniewski padł (2011)

=== TV Theatre ===
- Panna Julia (1990)
- Szkoła uczuć. Dzieje pewnego młodzieńca (1995)
- Legenda o świętym Krzysztofie (1995)
- Sprawa Stawrogina (1996)
- Przybysz z Narbony (1996)
- W poszukiwaniu zgubionego buta (1997)
- Dybuk (1999)
- Przemiana 1999 (2001)
- Rysa (2002)
- Bar świat (2002)
- Metamorfozy albo złoty osioł (2004)
- Książę nocy (2004)
- Duszyczka (2004)
- Tajny agent (2005)
- Słowo honoru (2006)
- Narty ojca świętego (2006)
- Kroniki – obyczaj lamentacyjny (2006)
- Sędziowie (2007)
- Hamlet Stanisława Wyspiańskiego (2008)
- Koncert życzeń (2008)

== Accolades ==
In 2010 he received Silver Gloria Artis Medal for Merit to Culture. In 2024 he received the Dragon of Dragons award at the Kraków Film Festival.
