= Marcel Łoziński =

Polish film director (1940–2025)

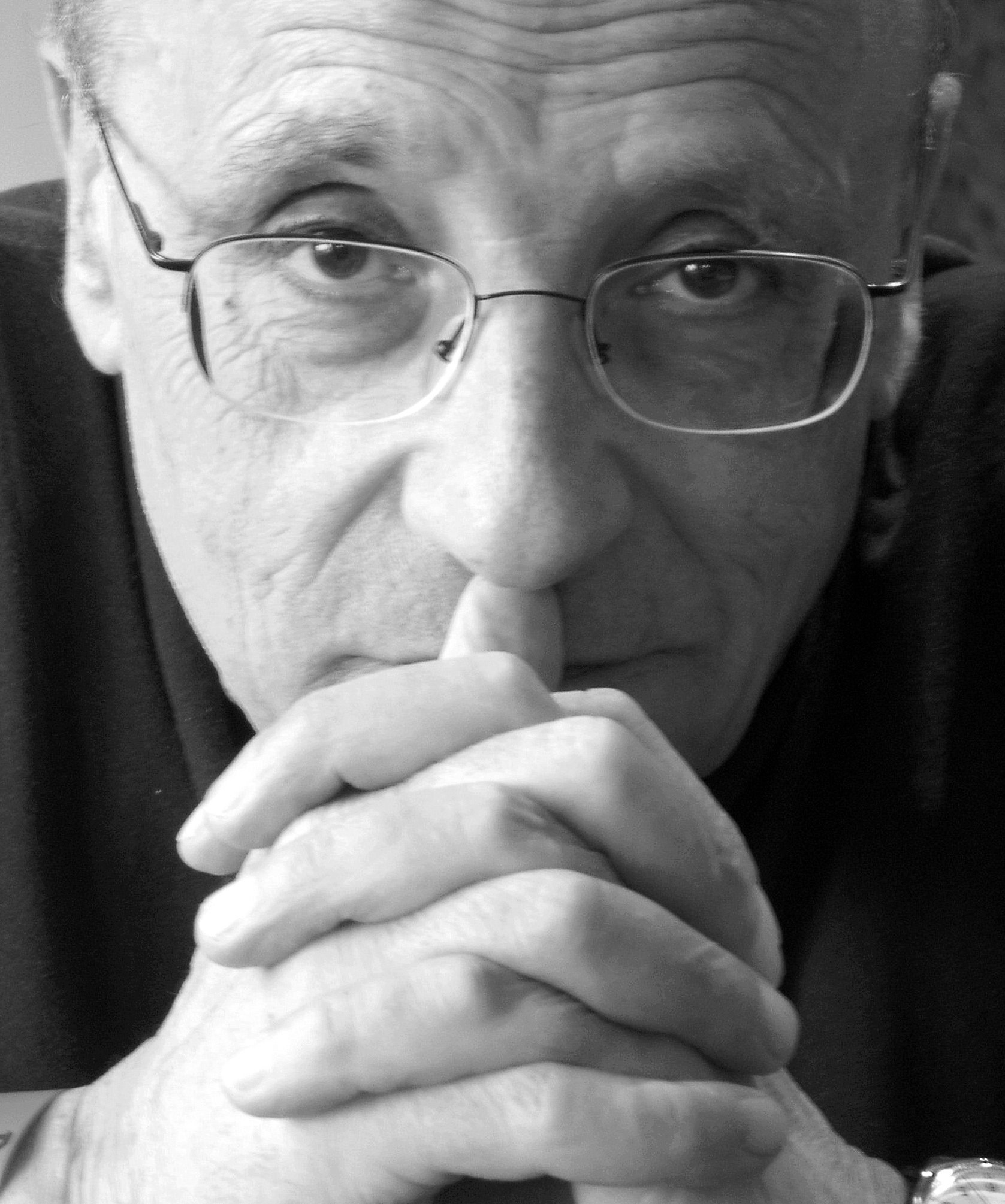
- Łoziński circa 2015
- Born: 17 May 1940; Paris, France
- Died: 20 August 2025 (aged 85); Warsaw, Poland
- Occupations: Film director Screenwriter
- Years active: 1972–2025

Marcel Łoziński (17 May 1940 – 20 August 2025) was a Polish film director and screenwriter. He directed 24 films since 1972. Łoziński was nominated for an Academy Award for Best Documentary Short for 89mm from Europe. He was born in Paris, France on 17 May 1940, and died on 20 August 2025, at the age of 85.

== Selected filmography ==
- 89mm from Europe (1993)
- Wszystko moze sie przytrafic [Anything Can Happen] (1995)
- Żeby nie bolało [So It Doesn't Hurt] (1998)
- Pamiętam [I Remember] (2001). Grand Prix, at the 2003 Warsaw Jewish Film Festival
- Tonia i jej dzieci Best Polish film award at the 2013 Jewish Motifs International Film Festival
- Father and Son on a Journey (2013)
