= Maciej Dejczer =

Polish film director

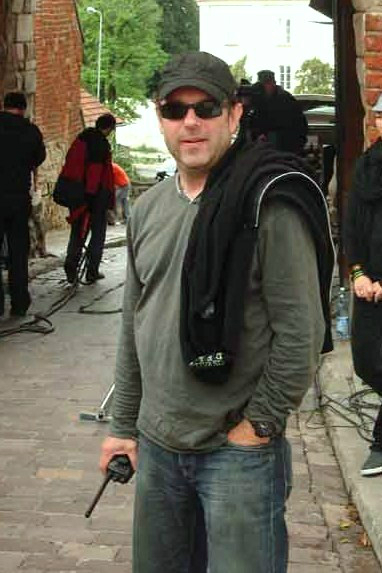
- Maciej Dejczer in 2008
- Born: July 15, 1953 (age 72); Gdańsk, Poland
- Occupation: director
- Known for: 300 Miles to Heaven

Maciej Dejczer is a Polish film director, best known for his film 300 Miles to Heaven (1989), which won the second European Film Award for European Discovery of the Year. He is an alumnus of the Krzysztof Kieślowski Film School in Katowice.

== Filmography ==
- 1986: Dzieci śmieci
- 1989: 300 Miles to Heaven
- 1993: To musisz być ty
- 1994: Jest jak jest
- 1997: Bandyta
- 1999–2000: Czułość i kłamstwa
- 2000–2006: M jak miłość
- 2001–2003: Na dobre i na złe
- 2002–2006: Samo życie
- 2004–2005: Oficer
- 2005–2006: Magda M.
- 2006: Klinika samotnych serc
- 2006: Oficerowie
- 2007: Trzeci oficer
- 2008: Ojciec Mateusz
- 2009: Teraz albo nigdy!
- 2011: Chichot losu
- 2012: Misja Afganistan
- 2015: Strażacy
- 2015: Listy do M. 2

== Awards ==
- Golden Lions Award at the Gdynia Film Festival, 1990 for 300 Miles to Heaven
- European Film Award for European Discovery of the Year, 1989 for 300 Miles to Heaven
