= List of 2007 films based on actual events =

This is a list of films and miniseries that are based on actual events. All films on this list are from American production unless indicated otherwise.

== 2007 ==
- 13 Roses (Spanish: Las 13 Rosas) (2007) – Spanish–Italian historical drama film following the tragic fate of Las Trece Rosas, fighting for their ideals in the aftermath of the Spanish Civil War
- 26 Years Diary (Japanese: あなたを忘れない; Korean: 너를 잊지 않을거야) (2007) – Japanese-South Korean biographical drama film telling the story of Lee Su-hyon's life and death
- 1612 (2007) – Russian epic historical drama film about the 17th century Time of Troubles and the Polish–Muscovite War with the Polish–Lithuanian Commonwealth
- 1944: The Final Defence (Finnish: Tali-Ihantala 1944) (2007) – Finnish war drama film based on the Battle of Tali–Ihantala during the Continuation War
- A Life Interrupted (2007) – biographical crime television film depicting events in the life of sexual assault victim Debbie Smith, which led to the passage of the Debbie Smith Act
- A Mighty Heart (2007) – biographical drama film based on the 2003 memoir of the same name by Mariane Pearl, covering the 2002 kidnapping and murder by terrorists in Pakistan of her late husband Daniel Pearl, an American journalist with The Wall Street Journal
- Alexandra (Russian: Александра) (2007) – Russian war drama film about the Second Chechen War
- American Gangster (2007) – biographical crime film loosely based on the criminal career of Frank Lucas, a gangster from La Grange, North Carolina who smuggled heroin into the United States on American service planes returning from the Vietnam War, before being detained by a task force led by Newark Detective Richie Roberts
- American Pastime (2007) – war drama film depicting life inside the Topaz War Relocation Center, a Utah prison camp which held thousands of people during the internment of Japanese Americans during World War II
- An American Crime (2007) – crime horror drama film based on the true story of the torture and murder of Sylvia Likens by Indianapolis single mother Gertrude Baniszewski
- And When Did You Last See Your Father? (2007) – British drama film based on the 1993 memoir of the same title by Blake Morrison
- The Anna Nicole Smith Story (2007) – biographical drama film depicting the life of Anna Nicole Smith
- The Assassination of Jesse James by the Coward Robert Ford (2007) – epic revisionist Western dramatizing the relationship between Jesse James and Robert Ford, focusing on the events that lead up to the titular killing
- Barefoot Gen (Japanese: はだしのゲン) (2007) – Japanese war drama miniseries loosely based on Keiji Nakazawa's own experiences as a Hiroshima atomic bombing survivor
- Bastard Boys (2007) – Australian drama miniseries telling the story of the 1998 Australian waterfront dispute
- Battle for Haditha (2007) – British drama film based on the Haditha killings
- Battle in Seattle (2007) – American-Canadian-German political action thriller film depicting the protest in 1999, as thousands of activists arrive in Seattle, Washington in masses to protest the WTO Ministerial Conference of 1999
- The Beckoning Silence (2007) – British biographical disaster television film following and retracing the 1936 Eiger north face climbing disaster where five climbers perished while attempting to scale the north face of the Eiger mountain in Switzerland
- Becoming Jane (2007) – biographical romantic drama film depicting the early life of the British author Jane Austen and her lasting love for Thomas Langlois Lefroy
- The Black Pimpernel (Swedish: Svarta nejlikan) (2007) – Swedish biographical drama film about Harald Edelstam, Sweden's ambassador to Chile, who after the military coup of Augusto Pinochet in 1973, managed to save the lives of more than 1,300 people by taking them to his embassy and transporting them to Sweden
- Black Water (2007) – Australian horror film inspired by the true story of a crocodile attack in Australia's Northern Territory in December 2003
- The Blue-Eyed Giant (Turkish: Mavi Gözlü Dev) (2007) – Turkish biographical drama film about the period Nâzım Hikmet spent in Bursa Prison after 1941
- The Border (Finnish: Raja 1918; Russian: Граница 1918) (2007) – Finnish-Russian war drama film based on Kai Donner and his experiences after the Finnish Civil War
- Borderland (2007) – American-Mexican horror film loosely based on the true story of Adolfo de Jesús Constanzo, a drug lord and the leader of a religious cult that practiced human sacrifice
- Bordertown (2007) – crime drama film inspired by the true story of the numerous female homicides in Ciudad Juárez and tells the story of an inquisitive American reporter sent in by her American newspaper to investigate the murders
- Breach (2007) – spy thriller film based on the true story of Robert Hanssen, an FBI agent convicted of spying for the Soviet Union and later Russia for more than two decades
- The Bronx Is Burning (2007) – sport drama miniseries focusing on baseball's triumph over the turmoil and hysteria of 1977 New York City and how the New York Yankees came to embody the hopes and fears of an unforgettable summer with Billy Martin and Reggie Jackson's warfare under George Steinbrenner's leadership
- Bury My Heart at Wounded Knee (2007) – Western historical drama television film depicting a history of Native Americans in the American West in the 1860s and 1870s, focusing upon the transition from traditional ways of living to living on reservations and their treatment during that period
- California Dreamin' (Romanian: California Dreamin' (nesfârșit)) (2007) – Romanian comedy war drama film based on the true story of a train containing American radar equipment required in Kosovo that was stopped for four days in a small village on the Bărăgan Plain during the 1999 NATO bombing of the Federal Republic of Yugoslavia
- Caravaggio (2007) – Italian historical miniseries based on real life events of Baroque painter Michelangelo Merisi da Caravaggio
- Cargo 200 (Russian: Груз 200) (2007) – Russian neo-noir thriller film depicting the late Soviet society, set during the culmination of the Soviet–Afghan War in 1984
- Chapter 27 (2007) – Canadian-American biographical drama film depicting the murder of John Lennon by Mark David Chapman
- Charlie Wilson's War (2007) – biographical comedy drama film based on the story of U.S. Congressman Charlie Wilson and CIA operative Gust Avrakotos, whose efforts led to Operation Cyclone, a program to organize and support the Afghan mujahideen during the Soviet–Afghan War
- Chicago 10 (2007) – animated crime drama film telling the story of the Chicago Eight
- Chicago Massacre: Richard Speck (2007) – crime horror film based on the crimes of Chicagoan mass murderer Richard Speck
- Childhoods (French: Enfances) (2007) – French biographical anthology film depicting formative incidents in the pre-adolescent lives of iconic filmmakers Fritz Lang, Orson Welles, Jacques Tati, Jean Renoir, Alfred Hitchcock and Ingmar Bergman, with each segment structured to resemble its subject's familiar signature style
- Christopher Columbus – The Enigma (Portuguese: Cristóvão Colombo – O Enigma) (2007) – Portuguese historical drama film depicting the true story of a doctor and his wife who went on a journey to prove that discoverer Christopher Columbus was in fact Portuguese
- Columbus: The Lost Voyage (2007) – American-British historical adventure television film depicting a lifelong account of explorer Christopher Columbus and his founding of what is now often referred to as the New World
- The Company (2007) – historical drama miniseries about the activities of the CIA during the Cold War
- Consenting Adults (2007) – British biographical drama television film portraying the events of the Wolfenden Committee
- Control (2007) – British biographical film about the life of Ian Curtis, singer of the late-1970s English post-punk band Joy Division
- Corleone (Italian: Il Capo dei Capi) (2007) – Italian biographical crime miniseries telling the story of Salvatore Riina, alias Totò u Curtu (Totò the Short), a mafioso boss from Corleone, Sicily
- The Counterfeiters (German: Die Fälscher) (2007) – Austrian-German war drama film fictionalizing Operation Bernhard, a secret plan by Nazi Germany during World War II to destabilize the United Kingdom by flooding its economy with forged Bank of England pound notes
- Crazy (2007) – biographical musical drama film inspired by the life of Nashville guitarist Hank Garland
- Curse of the Zodiac (2007) – crime horror film inspired by the true story of the hunt for a notorious serial killer known as "Zodiac" who claimed responsibility for the still unsolved murders
- Curtin (2007) – Australian biographical television film about John Curtin, the Prime Minister of Australia during the Second World War
- Daphne (2007) – British biographical drama television film based on the authorised biography, Daphne du Maurier: The Secret Life of the Renowned Storyteller by Margaret Forster about the life of Daphne du Maurier
- Dark Matter (2007) – drama film loosely inspired by the true story of Gang Lu, a former graduate student who killed four faculty members and one student at the University of Iowa in 1991
- Death Defying Acts (2007) – British-Australian historical romance film concerning an episode in the life of Hungarian-American escapologist Harry Houdini at the height of his career in the 1920s
- Defenders of Riga (Latvian: Rīgas sargi) (2007) – Latvian historical war film depicting the Latvian defense of Riga in November 1919 during its War of Independence
- Dennis P. (2007) – Dutch crime drama film inspired by the true story of Dennis P, who became Holland's biggest diamond thief, when he walked away with the entire 20 million euros stock of an international diamond trader, using a microwave oven as a swagbag
- Diana: Last Days of a Princess (2007) – biographical drama television film depicting an account of the last two months in the life of Diana, Princess of Wales, leading up to her death on 31 August 1997
- The Diving Bell and the Butterfly (French: Le Scaphandre et le Papillon) (2007) – French biographical drama film depicting Jean-Dominique Bauby's life after suffering a massive stroke that left him with a condition known as locked-in syndrome
- Don't Waste Your Time, Johnny! (Italian: Lascia perdere, Johnny!) (2007) – Italian biographical comedy drama film loosely based on real life events of musician Fausto Mesolella, a member of Piccola Orchestra Avion Travel
- Ed Gein: The Butcher of Plainfield (2007) – crime horror film based on the crimes of Ed Gein, an American murderer who killed at least two women in Plainfield, Wisconsin during the 1950s
- Eichmann (2007) – British biographical crime film detailing the interrogation of Adolf Eichmann
- Eight Miles High (German: Das wilde Leben) (2007) – German biographical drama film depicting the "wild life" of Uschi Obermaier, a West German sex symbol and icon of the era
- El Greco (2007) – Greek biographical drama film about the life of the Greek painter of the Spanish Renaissance, Domenicos Theotokopoulos, known worldwide as El Greco
- Elijah (2007) – Canadian comedy drama television film about the life and career of Elijah Harper, the provincial MLA in Manitoba whose stand on First Nations rights brought down the Meech Lake Accord in 1990
- Elizabeth: The Golden Age (2007) – British-French-German-American biographical historical drama film portraying events during the latter part of the reign of Elizabeth I
- Everest '82 (2007) – Canadian survival drama miniseries telling the true story of the first Canadians to climb Mount Everest
- The Final Season (2007) – sport drama film based on the true story of Kent Stock, who in 1991 took on what he perceives as the job of a lifetime as head coach of the Norway High School Tigers baseball team
- Freedom Writers (2007) – biographical drama film based on the 1999 book The Freedom Writers Diary by teacher Erin Gruwell and students who compiled the book out of real diary entries about their lives that they wrote in their English class at Woodrow Wilson Classical High School in Long Beach, California
- Gandhi, My Father (Hindi: गांधी मेरे पिता) (2007) – Indian Hindi language biographical drama film exploring the troubled relationship between Mahatma Gandhi and his son Harilal Gandhi
- Ganes (2007) – Finnish biographical film about Finnish rock band Hurriganes, told from the point of view of drummer/vocalist Remu Aaltonen
- Genghis Khan: To the Ends of the Earth and Sea (Japanese: 蒼き狼 地果て海尽きるまで) (2007) – Japanese-Mongolian historical drama film depicting the life of Genghis Khan
- Georg (Russian: Георг) (2007) – Estonian-Finnish-Russian biographical drama film about Estonian singer Georg Ots
- The Girl Next Door (2007) – thriller horror film inspired by the real-life murder of Sylvia Likens
- Goodbye Bafana (2007) – international co-production drama film about the relationship between Nelson Mandela and James Gregory, his censor officer and prison guard
- Gracie (2007) – sport drama film partially based on the childhood experiences of Elisabeth Shue
- The Gray Man (2007) – biographical thriller film based on the actual life and events of American serial killer, rapist and cannibal Albert Fish
- The Great Debaters (2007) – historical drama film following the trials and tribulations of the Wiley College debate team in 1935 Texas
- Guru (Hindi: गुरु) (2007) – Indian Hindi-language drama film rumored to be a biographical film of the industrial tycoon Dhirubhai Ambani
- Héroes (2007) – Chilean historical anthology miniseries with each episode relating to the history of one of the principal figures of the Chilean history in the 19th century: Bernardo O'Higgins, José Miguel Carrera, Manuel Rodríguez, Diego Portales, José Manuel Balmaceda and Arturo Prat
- Hindenburg: The Untold Story (German: Das Geheimnis der Hindenburg) (2007) – German biographical drama television film about the disaster of the Hindenburg, and the investigation that followed
- The Home Song Stories (2007) – Australian drama film loosely based on aspects of Tony Ayres life
- Hwang Jin Yi (Korean: 황진이) (2007) – South Korean biographical drama film about the life of Hwang Jin-yi, the most famous courtesan (or "gisaeng") in Korean history
- I'm Not There (2007) – American-German musical drama film inspired by the life and music of American singer-songwriter Bob Dylan, with six actors depicting different facets of Dylan's public personas
- In the Valley of Elah (2007) – crime drama film portraying a military father's search for his son and, after his body is found, subsequent hunt for his son's killers, based on actual events
- Intimate Enemies (French: L'Ennemi intime) (2007) – French war drama film following a French platoon during Algeria's war of independence
- Into the Wild (2007) – biographical adventure drama film depicting the story of Christopher McCandless, a man who hiked across North America into the Alaskan wilderness in the early 1990s
- Joanne Lees: Murder in the Outback (2007) – British mystery drama film based on the real life disappearance of Peter Falconio
- Jonestown: Paradise Lost (2007) – Canadian-French-South African historical drama television film recreating the last week before the mass murder-suicide on November 18, 1978, by Jim Jones
- Jump! (2007) – British-Austrian crime drama film loosely based on the real-life Halsman murder case
- Kalloori (Tamil: கல்லூரி) (2007) – Indian Tamil-language coming-of-age drama film inspired on a real-life incident of three college girls of the Tamil Nadu Agricultural University being burnt alive in the 2000 Dharmapuri bus burning incident
- Kathantara (Odia: କଥାନ୍ତରା) (2007) – Indian Odia-language disaster film depicting real life tribulations of the 1999 Odisha cyclone
- Katyń (2007) – Polish historical drama film about the 1940 Katyn massacre
- The King (2007) – Australian biographical drama television film examining the life of Australian entertainer Graham Kennedy
- King Naresuan: Hongsawadee's Hostage (Thai: ตำหนักสมเด็จพระนเรศวรมหาราชภาคองค์ปราการหงสา) (2007) – Thai biographical historical film concerning the childhood of King Naresuan the Great
- King Naresuan II: Reclaiming Sovereignty (Thai: ตำหนักสมเด็จพระนเรศวรมหาราชภาคประกาศอิสรภาพ) (2007) – Thai biographical historical film concerning the plots to assassinate King Naresuan the Great following the death of Bayinnaung
- The Kingdom (2007) – American-German action thriller film based on the 1996 bombing of the Khobar housing complex, also on the 2004 Khobar massacre and the two 2003 bombings of four compounds in Riyadh
- Kings of South Beach (2007) – crime drama television film loosely based on a true story about the exploits of Chris Paciello, a transplanted New York Cityer who was involved with the Mafia back in his hometown
- La Vie en Rose (2007) – French-Czech-British biographical musical film about the life of French singer Édith Piaf
- The Lark Farm (Italian: La masseria delle allodole) (2007) – Italian historical film about the Armenian genocide
- The Last Legion (2007) – international co-production historical action film loosely inspired by the events of 5th-century European history, notably the collapse of the Western Roman Empire
- The Last Ottoman (Turkish: Son Osmanlı Yandım Ali) (2007) – Turkish biographical action film inspired by the landing of Mustafa Kemal at Samsun
- The Life of Buddha (Thai: ประวัติพระพุทธเจ้า) (2007) – Thai animated religious drama film about the life of Gautama Buddha
- Life Support (2007) – drama television film loosely based on the real-life story of Ana Wallace, an HIV-positive woman
- Long Road to Heaven (Indonesian: Makna dibalik tragedi) (2007) – Indonesian biographical drama film about the 2002 Bali bombings
- Lost Holiday (2007) – survival drama television film telling the true story of Jim and Suzanne Shemwell who become trapped in a blizzard while on vacation
- Lucky Miles (2007) – Australian drama film based on several true stories involving people entering Western Australia by boat to seek asylum
- Lust, Caution (Mandarin: 色，戒) (2007) – Chinese spy mystery film based on the historical event of Chinese spy Zheng Pingru's failed attempt to assassinate the Japanese collaborator Ding Mocun
- The Man of Glass (Italian: L'uomo di vetro) (2007) – Italian crime drama film based on real life events of the first Sicilian Mafia's "pentito", Leonardo Vitale
- Maradona, the Hand of God (Spanish: Maradona – La mano de Dios) (2007) – Argentine-Italian biographical drama film based on real life events of footballer Diego Maradona
- March of Millions (German: Die Flucht) (2007) – German war drama miniseries portraying German war-time suffering during the evacuation of East Prussia
- The Mark of Cain (2007) – British war drama television film following three young men as they experience the extremity of war for the first time, based on real life testimonies by soldiers who have served in Iraq
- Martian Child (2007) – comedy drama film based on the author's own experiences as a single adoptive parent, with most of the key moments drawn from actual events
- Matters of Life and Dating (2007) – romantic comedy television film about Linda Dackman, who struggles to re-enter the dating world after being diagnosed with breast cancer and undergoing a mastectomy and breast reconstruction
- Maxwell (2007) – British biographical drama television film about the last days of media magnate Robert Maxwell
- May 18 (Korean: 화려한 휴가) (2007) – South Korean historical drama film based on the Gwangju massacre on May 18, 1980
- The Messiah (Persian: مسیح) (2007) – Iranian religious drama film depicting the life of Jesus from an Islamic perspective, based not only on the canonical gospels, but also the Qur'an, and, it would seem, the Gospel of Barnabas
- Miss Austen Regrets (2007) – British-American biographical drama television film about the later years of the life of Jane Austen
- Miss Marie Lloyd (2007) – British biographical drama television film tracing the turbulent and unconventional life of Edwardian music hall star Marie Lloyd
- Mission 90 Days (Malayalam: ദൗത്യം 90 ദിവസം) (2007) – Indian Malayalam-language crime thriller film based on the assassination of former Indian Prime Minister Rajiv Gandhi and the following investigation
- Molière (2007) – French historical drama film about the life and works of playwright, actor and poet Molière
- Mongol (Mongolian: Монгол) (2007) – Mongolian-Kazakh-Russian historical epic film about the early life of Temüjin, who later came to be known as Genghis Khan
- The Mud Boy (Spanish: El niño de barro) (2007) – Spanish-Argentine thriller drama film the story of the Petiso Orejudo serial killer
- The Murder of Princess Diana (2007) – biographical drama television film depicting a fictionalized account of the events leading up to the tragic car accident that claimed the lives of Princess Diana, her companion Dodi Fayed and their chauffeur in a Paris tunnel
- Music Within (2007) – biographical historical drama film following the life of Richard Pimentel, a respected public speaker whose hearing disability attained in the Vietnam War drove him to become an activist for the Americans with Disabilities Act, a respected public speaker whose hearing disability attained in the Vietnam War drove him to become an activist for the Americans with Disabilities Act
- My Boy Jack (2007) – British biographical television film telling the story of Rudyard Kipling and his grief for his son, John, who died in the First World War
- My Father (Korean: 마이 파더) (2007) – South Korean drama film based on a true story about an adopted son who is searching for his biological parents in South Korea
- My Opposition: The Diaries of Friedrich Kellner (2007) – Canadian biographical war film based on news stories in Germany and America about the Friedrich Kellner diary
- My Winnipeg (2007) – Canadian historical drama film depicting a portrait of film-maker Guy Maddin's home town of Winnipeg, Manitoba
- Namibia: The Struggle for Liberation (2007) – American-Namibian epic biographical film about the Namibian independence struggle against South African occupation as seen through the life of Sam Nujoma, the leader of the South West Africa People's Organisation and the first president of the Republic of Namibia
- Nanking (Mandarin: 南京) (2007) – Chinese historical war film about the Nanjing massacre, committed in 1937 by the Japanese army in the former capital city Nanjing, China
- Nightwatching (2007) – British-Polish-Canadian-Dutch historical drama film about the artist Rembrandt and the creation of his 1642 painting The Night Watch
- Nuclear Secrets (2007) – British biographical drama miniseries which looks at the race for nuclear supremacy from the Manhattan Project through to Pakistan's nuclear weapons programme
- Operation Silver A (Czech: Operace Silver A) (2007) – Czech drama film based on the military operation of the same name
- Parzania (2007) – Indian drama film inspired by the true story of a ten-year-old Parsi boy, Azhar Mody who disappeared after the 28 February 2002 Gulbarg Society massacre during which 69 people were killed and which was one of many events in the communal riots in Gujarat in 2002
- Periyar (Tamil: பெரியார்) (2007) – Indian Tamil-language biographical film about the life of the social reformer and rationalist Periyar E. V. Ramasamy
- Persepolis (2007) – international co-production animated biographical drama film depicting Marjane Satrapi's experiences growing up during the Iranian Revolution
- Piano, solo (2007) – Italian biographical drama film depicting real life events of jazz pianist and composer Luca Flores
- The Pirate: Marco Pantani (Italian: Il Pirata: Marco Pantani) (2007) – Italian biographical drama television film depicting real life events of road racing cyclist Marco Pantani
- The Pope's Toilet (Spanish: El Baño del Papa) (2007) – Uruguayan comedy drama film inspired by a real-life 1988 tour of South America, including a stop in Melo, by the well-traveled Pope John Paul II
- Pride (2007) – biographical sport drama film loosely based upon the true story of Philadelphia swim coach James "Jim" Ellis
- Primeval (2007) – action adventure horror film inspired by the true story of Gustave, a 20 ft (6.1 m), 2,000 pounds (910 kg; 0.91 t) giant, man-eating Nile Crocodile in Burundi
- Protecting the King (2007) – biographical drama film telling the story of David Stanley, the stepbrother and bodyguard of Elvis
- PVC-1 (2007) – Colombian drama film inspired by a true story about a pipe bomb improvised explosive device (IED) that was placed around the neck of an extortion victim
- Redacted (2007) – war drama film loosely based on the 2006 Mahmudiyah killings in Mahmoudiyah, Iraq, when U.S. Army soldiers raped an Iraqi girl and murdered her along with her family
- Resurrecting the Champ (2007) – sport drama film inspired by a Los Angeles Times Magazine article entitled "Resurrecting the Champ" by J. R. Moehringer, centering on a fictionalized former athlete, living on the streets of Denver, who attempts to impersonate the life and career of former professional heavyweight boxer Bob Satterfield
- Rise of the Footsoldier (2007) – British action biographical film following the rise of Carlton Leach from a football hooligan to becoming a member of a notorious gang of criminals who rampaged their way through Essex in the late eighties and early nineties
- Road to Dawn (Mandarin: 夜·明) (2007) – Chinese historical drama film depicting an obscure episode in Sun Yat-sen's revolutionary life, when he sought refuge in Penang from July to December 1910
- Rogue (2007) – Australian horror film inspired by the true story of Sweetheart, a giant male saltwater crocodile that attacked boats in the late 1970s
- Romulus, My Father (2007) – Australian biographical drama film based on the memoir by Raimond Gaita, outlining the life of his father, Romulus Gaiţă
- Ruffian (2007) – biographical sport drama television film telling the story of the U.S. Racing Hall of Fame Champion Thoroughbred filly Ruffian who went undefeated until her death after breaking down in a nationally televised match race at Belmont Park on July 6, 1975, against the Kentucky Derby winner, Foolish Pleasure
- Satham Podathey (Tamil: சத்தம் போடாதே) (2007) – Indian Tamil-language psychological thriller film based on a true story of an unhappy couple gone wrong
- Savage Grace (2007) – French-Spanish-American drama film based on the highly dysfunctional relationship between heiress and socialite Barbara Daly Baekeland and her son, Antony
- Say It in Russian (2007) – American-French drama film about an American businessman who hooks up with a young Russian girl who turns out to be the daughter of a rich Russian mafia oligarch – allegedly based on a true story
- September Dawn (2007) – Canadian-American historical Western film depicting an interpretation of the 1857 Mountain Meadows massacre
- Severed Ways (2007) – adventure drama film inspired by the story of Thorfinn Karlsefni, an Icelandic explorer who followed Leif Ericson to Vinland (North America) hoping to establish a colony at the beginning of the 11th century
- Shadows in the Palace (Korean: 궁녀) (2007) – South Korean historical drama film depicting a fictionalized account of gungnyeo, court maids during South Korea's Joseon era
- Shake Hands with the Devil (2007) – Canadian war drama film recounting Roméo Dallaire's harrowing personal journey during the 1994 Rwandan genocide and how the United Nations didn't heed Dallaire's urgent pleas for further assistance to halt the massacre
- Shoot on Sight (2007) – British crime thriller film based on Operation Kratos, the police "shoot-to-kill" policy applied to suspected suicide-bombers after the 7 July 2005 London bombings
- Shootout at Lokhandwala (Hindi: लोखंडवाला में गोलीबारी) (2007) – Indian Hindi-language action thriller film based on the 1991 Lokhandwala Complex shootout, a real-life gun battle between gangsters and the Mumbai Police
- Sinking of the Lusitania: Terror at Sea (German: Der Untergang der Lusitania: Tragödie eines Luxusliners) (2007) – British-German biographical drama film depicting a dramatization of the sinking of the RMS Lusitania on 7 May 1915 by a German U-boat, U-20
- Sinners (2007) – crime drama film about three young men who, following the word of God as they know it, set off to avenge their sins, and plummet into a world of robbery, thievery, seduction and murder – based on a true story
- The Sovereign's Servant (Russian: Слуга государев) (2007) – Russian historical swashbuckler war film depicting the events of the Great Northern War, with a particular focus on the Battle of Poltava
- St. Giuseppe Moscati: Doctor to the Poor (Italian: Giuseppe Moscati – L'amore che guarisce) (2007) – Italian biographical drama television film based on real life events of doctor and then Roman Catholic Saint Giuseppe Moscati
- The Staircase Murders (2007) – crime thriller television film telling the story of Michael Peterson who was convicted in 2003 of killing his wife by beating her over the head
- Stuck (2007) – Canadian-American-British black comedy thriller film inspired by the true story of the murder of Gregory Glenn Biggs
- Sybil (2007) – biographical drama television film depicting the fictionalized story of Shirley Ardell Mason, who was diagnosed with multiple personality disorder (more commonly known then as "split personality", now called dissociative identity disorder)
- Talk to Me (2007) – biographical drama film about Washington, D.C. radio personality Ralph "Petey" Greene, an ex-con who became a popular talk show host and community activist, and Dewey Hughes, his friend and manager
- The Ten Commandments (2007) – American-Canadian animated Christian epic film following the story of Moses
- Theresa: The Body of Christ (Spanish: Teresa, el cuerpo de Cristo) (2007) – Spanish biographical drama film based on the life of Spain's feminist mystic Saint Teresa
- Trainwreck: My Life as an Idiot (2007) – comedy drama film based on the life of Jeff Nichols as set out in his autobiographical book The Little Yellow Bus
- United Red Army (Japanese: 実録・連合赤軍 あさま山荘への道程) (2007) – Japanese crime drama film outlining Japanese student movements in the 60s, then showing the formation of the Japanese United Red Army, a communist armed resistance group
- Václav (2007) – Czech biographical drama film based on a true story that took place during Václav Havel's vast amnesty in early 90s
- Voice of a Murderer (Korean: 그놈 목소리) (2007) – South Korean crime thriller film depicting a fictionalized account of the real-life kidnapping case of 9-year-old Lee Hyung-ho in 1991
- What We Do Is Secret (2007) – biographical drama film about Darby Crash, singer of the late-1970s Los Angeles punk rock band the Germs
- The Worst Journey in the World (2007) – British biographical drama television film based on the 1922 memoir by Apsley Cherry-Garrard of Robert Falcon Scott's Terra Nova expedition to the South Pole in 1910–1913
- Wounded (Hindi: घायल) (2007) – Indian Hindi-language biographical film based on the true story of Seema Parihar
- Zodiac (2007) – neo-noir mystery thriller film telling the story of the manhunt for the Zodiac Killer, a serial murderer who terrorized the San Francisco Bay Area during the late 1960s and early 1970s, taunting police with letters, bloodstained clothing, and ciphers mailed to newspapers
