= Freedom Writers (disambiguation) =

Freedom Writers is a 2007 American film.

Freedom Writers may also refer to:

- Freedom Writers Foundation, a charitable organization started by Erin Gruwell and former students of Wilson Classical High School in Long Beach, California
- The Freedom Writers Diary, a 1999 book of diaries written by the Freedom Writers and Erin Gruwell; basis for the film
- Freedom Writers (soundtrack), a soundtrack album from the film
