= MPX =

MPX may refer to:

== Technology ==
- MPX filter, a function found in cassette decks
- Multiplexing, the process of combining multiple analog or digital signals into one
  - Multiplexer, an electronic device which accomplishes this task

=== Computing ===
- Multi-Pointer X, an extension to X.Org
- MPX Microsoft Project Exchange File Format, a Microsoft Project file format
- Intel MPX, a set of Memory Protection Extensions to the x86 instruction set architecture
- .mpx, a video file format in the Kingston K-PEX 100
- IBM 1800 MPX, in the list of operating systems
- MPX bus, a PowerPC CPU bus, for example in the PowerPC G4

== Other uses ==
- MPX Energia, former name of the Brazilian utility company Eneva
- MPI MPXpress, a train locomotive
- SIG MPX, a submachine gun from SIG Sauer
- An abbreviation for mpox, an infectious viral disease
- Motion Picture Exchange, acronym for a global sales exchange company that serves as a liaison to distributors
- Misima language, an Austronesian language in Papua New Guinea by ISO 639-3 code
