= John Tu =

American billionaire

- 杜紀川
- Born: August 12, 1941 (age 85); Chongqing, Republic of China
- Citizenship: United States
- Education: Technical University of Darmstadt (Diplom)
- Occupations: Businessman; electrical engineer
- Title: CEO of Kingston Technology
- Children: 2

Chinese name
- Traditional Chinese: 杜紀川
- Simplified Chinese: 杜纪川
Transcriptions
Standard Mandarin
- Hanyu Pinyin: Dù Jìchuān
- Bopomofo: ㄉㄨˋ ㄐㄧˋ ㄔㄨㄢ
- Wade–Giles: Tu Chi-ch'uan

John Tu (Chinese: 杜紀川; pinyin: Dù Jìchuān; born August 12, 1941) is a Taiwanese-American billionaire business executive and philanthropist. He is the co-founder and chief executive officer (CEO) of the digital storage corporation Kingston Technology, which he established with David Sun in 1987.

Born in Chongqing, China, Tu was raised in Taiwan, studied electrical engineering in West Germany, and immigrated to the U.S. in 1971. He co-founded the computer memory company Camintonn with Sun in 1982, selling it to AST Research for $6 million in 1986. Following substantial financial losses in the 1987 stock market crash, the two founded Kingston Technology, which became a major manufacturer of computer memory products.

In 1996, they sold an 80 percent stake in Kingston to the Japanese conglomerate SoftBank for $1.5 billion, before repurchasing it for $450 million in 1999. The two attracted national attention for distributing $100 million from the sale proceeds to Kingston employees as bonuses. As of October 2026, Forbes estimates Tu's net worth at $33.7 billion, making him the 70th richest person in the world.

== Early life and education ==
Tu was born in Chongqing, China, in 1941. His father, Du Tongsun (杜桐蓀), was a government official who served as the director of film censorship in the Republic of China, while his mother, Zhu Li (朱莉), was a film actress. In 1945, his family moved to Shanghai, where his father worked for the Kuomintang government under Chiang Kai-shek. As the Chinese Civil War approached Shanghai, the family relocated to Taiwan in 1947. Because he was raised in a Mandarin-speaking family, he had difficulty adjusting to Taiwanese Hokkien as a child. In Taiwan, his father became a government film censor, reviewing films from mainland China and rejecting those containing communist themes.

While growing up in Taiwan, Tu developed an interest in Western popular music and began playing the guitar. He frequently skipped classes to pursue music and was expelled from the Affiliated Senior High School of National Taiwan Normal University. He was expelled from three high schools because of his lack of interest in his studies. As a result, his father sent him to stay with relatives in Germany. In 1960, Tu traveled to West Germany, where his uncle operated a Chinese restaurant. At the time, he spoke no German and knew little English. After several weeks in Germany, he enrolled in a language school in Munich. Seeking to study electrical engineering, Tu first completed a two-year apprenticeship at a shipbuilding factory.

In 1970, Tu graduated from the Technische Hochschule Darmstadt with a degree in electrical engineering. During his years in Germany, he made his first visit to the United States in 1968. After completing his engineering degree, he worked for Motorola in Wiesbaden, Germany. In 1971, Tu moved to the United States, where his sister was living.

== Career ==
=== Early business ventures ===
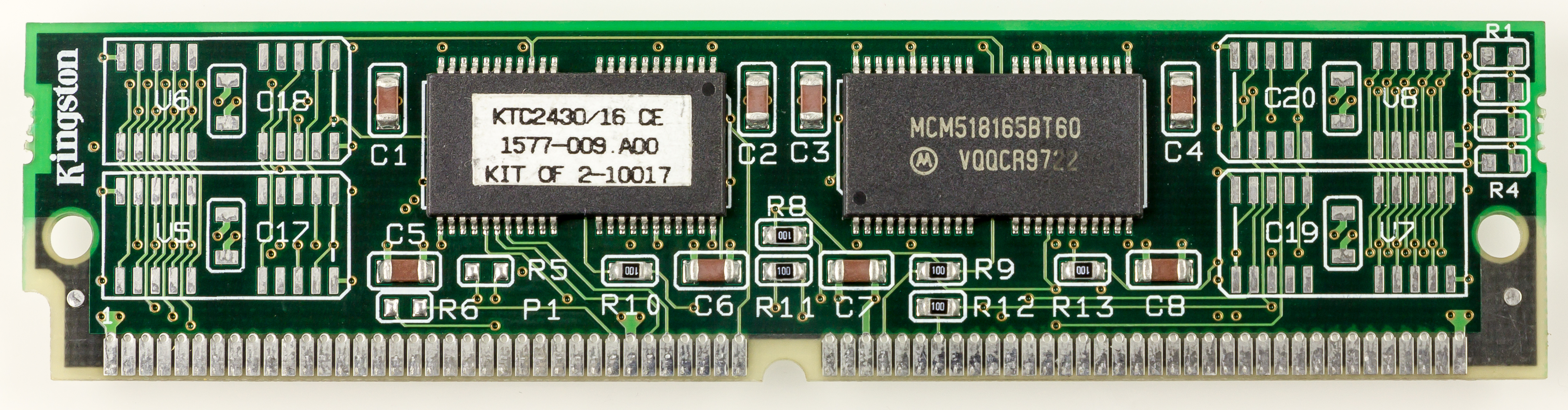
A Kingston single in-line memory module (SIMM), one of its early business products

After immigrating to the United States in 1971, Tu settled in Scottsdale, Arizona, where he was unable to find employment as an engineer and opened a gift shop selling merchandise imported from Taiwan. After two years, he borrowed approximately $5,000 from his parents and obtaining mortgage and construction loans to develop his first commercial property. He then purchased additional properties before selling his holdings and moving to Los Angeles in 1975.

In 1981, Tu met David Sun, a Taiwanese-born electrical engineer ten years his junior, through their shared interest in basketball. Sun introduced Tu to opportunities in the emerging computer industry, and, in 1982, they established Camintonn Corporation, a manufacturer of computer memory products. Operating initially from a garage, Sun developed memory boards while Tu managed sales, advertising their products in trade publications and taking orders by telephone. Their business developed memory expansion products compatible with computers manufactured by Digital Equipment Corporation (DEC), whose representatives offered to license their design for $250,000 in 1986. Later that year, Tu and Sun sold Camintonn to AST Research for $6 million. They entrusted their proceeds to a stockbroker and lost approximately $1 million each during the stock market crash of October 1987.

=== Founding of Kingston Technology ===
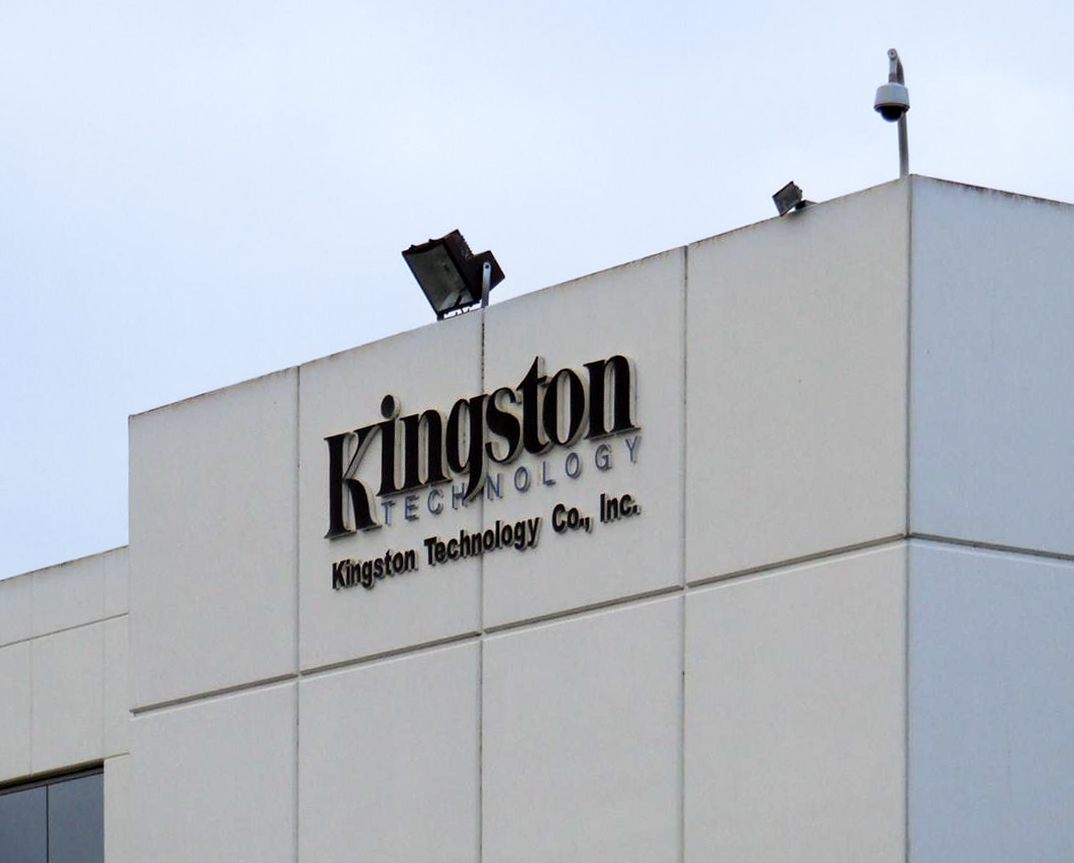
Kingston Technology's headquarters in Fountain Valley, California, in 2007

On October 19, 1987, the day of the stock market crash, Tu and Sun established Kingston Technology, a company specializing in computer memory upgrades. Sun developed a memory board using an older type of semiconductor chip that remained available during a shortage of newer memory components, allowing the company to supply computer manufacturers with replacement memory products. Tu concentrated on marketing and sales, while Sun oversaw the technical and engineering aspects of the business. The company was named after the American folk music group The Kingston Trio.

Kingston initially operated without venture capital, assembling and selling memory upgrades before subcontracting production to outside manufacturers as demand increased. By 1989, just two years after its establishment, the company had reached $40 million in annual sales. Its revenue increased to $251 million in 1992, when Inc. ranked Kingston first among the fastest-growing privately held companies in the United States. By 1993, Kingston recorded annual sales of approximately $433 million. In 1995, the company surpassed $1 billion in annual revenue, and Tu and Sun were included in the Forbes 400 list of the wealthiest Americans for the first time.

Tu and Sun developed an unconventional management structure at Kingston, working at desks on the company's sales floor rather than in private executive offices. They also instituted a quarterly employee profit-sharing program that distributed 5 percent of the company's profits as bonuses.

=== SoftBank acquisition and buyback ===
In August 1996, Tu and Sun agreed to sell an 80 percent interest in Kingston Technology to the Japanese conglomerate SoftBank for $1.5 billion in cash and stock. Under the transaction, they retained a combined 20 percent ownership interest and continued to manage the company. They had initially approached SoftBank founder Masayoshi Son to discuss distributing Kingston products in Japan, but Son instead proposed acquiring a controlling interest in the company.

In December 1996, Tu and Sun announced that they would distribute $100 million from the proceeds of the sale among approximately 450 Kingston employees. The initial distribution, made in January 1997, totaled approximately $38 million, with further payments of $20 million each following in 1998 and 1999. In October 1997, Tu and Sun agreed to revise the terms of the SoftBank acquisition, releasing the company from $333 million in scheduled payments under provisions that included possible additional payments if specified financial conditions were met.

In July 1999, Tu and Sun announced an agreement to repurchase SoftBank's 80 percent interest in Kingston for $450 million, approximately one-third of its 1996 purchase price. The transaction followed a downturn in the computer memory market and SoftBank's increasing emphasis on internet-related businesses. The repurchase was completed on July 30, 1999, restoring the founders' ownership of the company.

=== Later career and investments ===
Kingston Technology's exhibition booth at Taipei IT Month in 2016

Tu continued to serve as Kingston's chief executive officer, while Sun directed its engineering and operational activities. They expanded its product offerings beyond conventional computer memory modules into flash drives, solid-state drives, and memory card readers. By 2006, Kingston had reached annual sales of approximately $3.7 billion, supplying memory products to computer manufacturers, major corporations, and individual consumers. Kingston's annual revenue reached $6.5 billion in 2010.

Tu also became involved in the biotechnology industry as the principal financial backer of Fluxergy, an Irvine-based medical diagnostics company established in 2013. In May 2020, he provided $30 million to expand Fluxergy's manufacturing capacity as the company developed a rapid molecular diagnostic testing system for COVID-19. By that time, his total investment in the company was approaching $50 million. His son, Jonathan Tu, served as Fluxergy's chief financial officer.

In 2022, the Los Angeles Business Journal reported that Tu held a 50 percent ownership interest in Kingston, which was estimated to generate approximately $15 billion in annual revenue.

== Philanthropy ==
In 2021 Tu made a donation to the Western Iowa Journalism Foundation that enabled the Pulitzer Prize-winning Storm Lake (Iowa) Times to buy its local competition and a weekly in an adjoining county. He has supported Erin Gruwell's Freedom Writers and the Freedom Writers Foundation. In 2011, he donated $1.2 million to give every first year medical student at UC Irvine an iPad.

== Personal life ==
Tu is married to Mary Tu (王曼齡). They have two children: a son, Jonathan, and a daughter, Selena.
