= Freedom Riders (disambiguation) =

Freedom Riders, activists who rode the buses during the 1961 Freedom Rides in the Civil Rights Movement in the United States.

Freedom Rider or Freedom Ride also may refer to:

== Activism ==
- Freedom Ride (Australia), 1965 bus journey led by Charlie Perkins, to highlight racism against Indigenous Australians
- Reverse Freedom Rides, 1962 counter-action by segregationists, to the Freedom Rides in the southern United States

== Music ==
- Freedom Ride (album), 2015 album by Troy Cassar-Daley
- The Freedom Rider, 1964 album by jazz drummer Art Blakey and his group the Jazz Messengers
- "Freedom Rider", 1970 song on the album John Barleycorn Must Die

== Other uses ==
- Freedom Riders (film), 2010 American historical documentary film
- Freedom Rides Museum
- Freedom Riders National Monument

== See also ==
- Equality Ride, periodic LGBT rights bus tour by Soulforce
- Freedom Ride 1992, an action by third-wave feminists in the U.S.
- Freedom Writers (disambiguation)
