= Freedom Writers Foundation =

Non-profit organization

- Formation: 1997
- Founder: Erin Gruwell; John Tu
- Type: non profit

The Freedom Writers Foundation is a non-profit organization created to "inspire young, underprivileged students to pick up pens instead of guns." It was founded by Erin Gruwell, and John Tu (cofounder of the Kingston Technology Company) is a benefactor.

== About ==
The Freedom Writers Foundation is a nonprofit organization which was founded in 1997. It positively affects communities by decreasing high school dropout rates through the replication and enhancement of the Freedom Writers Method.

"The organization's overall purpose is to:

- Create opportunities for students to reach their full academic potential and aspire to higher education.
- Publicly and systematically promote an educational philosophy that values, upholds, and honors diversity.
- Inspire students to realize their roles as vital members of their communities."

"Following the Rodney King Riots and the O.J. Simpson trial, the mood in our city was unsettling, and on our first day of high school, we had only three things in common: we hated school, we hated our teacher, and we hated each other." This is a quote from the original Freedom Writers. Brought together in the classroom of Erin Gruwell, these students were taught to accept each other and accept themselves.

They all felt that they had been written off. "Low test scores, juvenile hall, alienation, and racial hostility helped us fit the labels the educational system placed on us: 'unteachable,' 'below average,' and 'delinquents.'" Gruwell helped the students to overcome their disadvantages by having them read books by other teenagers so they would be able to relate to the stories.

Gruwell also invited guest speakers to talk to her students, including Miep Gies, a woman who helped Anne Frank's family hide during the Holocaust, and Zlata Filipović, who wrote her own diary when she was only eleven years old. The students also went to a Holocaust museum in Los Angeles called the Museum of Tolerance.

The visit from Zlata Filipović was the inspiration for the students' own writing. In the class they were able to write anonymous journal entries about what they faced in their everyday lives. They were able to write about things that they had never had the chance to express before. Through this, they discovered that "Writing is a powerful form of self expression that could help us deal with our past and move forward."

The class came up with the name "Freedom Writers" as a modification of "Freedom Riders", a group of activists in the Civil Rights Movement.

Since graduating, they have kept their promise of trying to change education. They have pursued their undergraduate and graduate degrees, while continuing to share their story and mentor students across the country about what it's like to receive a second chance.

== Erin Gruwell – Founder ==
Erin Gruwell is the woman who began the Freedom Writers and compiled her students' stories into The Freedom Writers Diary. She started teaching in the fall of 1994 at Woodrow Wilson Classical High School in Long Beach, California. In interviews, she has said that she thinks she is the one who changed the most. "Everything I was told not to do, I did. They told me not to smile. I smiled. They told me never to show emotion. How could I not be a person, though? How could I not be compassionate and give a student a hug when they were hurting? I changed the most. I became the student."

She has said that she thinks teaching literature and writing is a great way to help people because there are so many ways to interpret any story. She would tell her students that she would teach them the rules so they could go out and break them.

Erin Gruwell first knew that she wanted to become a teacher through her father, who was a civil rights activist in the U.S. When she was young, they would talk about equality and fighting for the underdog. He was later affiliated with the Anaheim Angels. He would always say that you should judge a batter by his swing and not by the color of his skin. So much of her sensibility came from her dad. After the Los Angeles Riots in the early nineties, she changed what she wanted to do. Until then, she had wanted to be a lawyer and go to law school, but she decided that she could do more that was proactive in a classroom than reactionary in a courtroom.

== Freedom Writers in other schools ==
Schools which employ Gruwell's teaching methods include Booker T. Washington High School in Atlanta, Georgia, De La Salle Education Center in Kansas City, Missouri, Dunbar Middle School in Fort Worth, Texas, the Leadership Program at Crossroads Alternative High School in Coon Rapids, MN, and The Darkness to Light Education Project, which supports Crossroads Leadership. Groups inspired by the Freedom Writers include the Students of Unlimited Leadership [SOUL] Program in Chico, California and the Waller Scholars in Atlanta, Georgia.

The group has also drawn some negative attention. Connie Heermann, a teacher in Perry Township, Indiana, used The Freedom Writers Diary as part of her curriculum and received a one and a half year suspension. Objections to the language and sexual content in the book may have contributed to the controversy.

== See also ==
- Young Storytellers Foundation
