= Museum of Tolerance =

Coordinates: 34°03′13″N 118°24′06″W

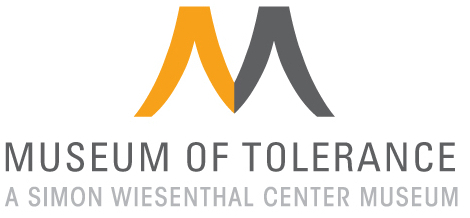

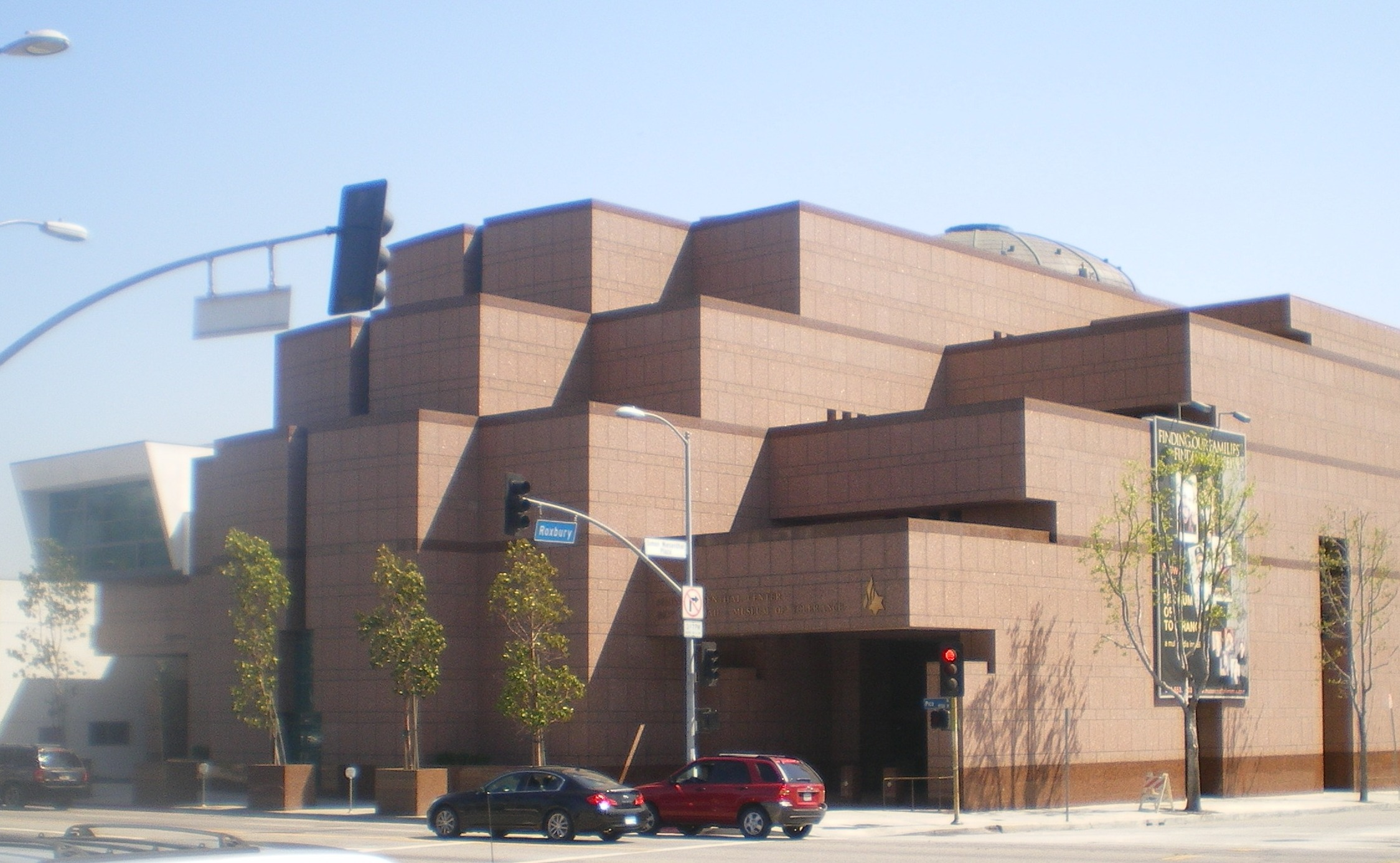
- Established: 1993
- Location: 9786 W. Pico Blvd; Los Angeles, California, United States
- Type: Holocaust memorials, racism and prejudice museum
- Visitors: 350,000 annually
- Website: www.museumoftolerance.com

The Museum of Tolerance (MOT) is a multimedia museum in Los Angeles, California, United States, designed to examine racism and prejudice around the world with a strong focus on the history of the Holocaust. The museum was established in 1993, as the educational arm of human rights organization, the Simon Wiesenthal Center. The museum also deals with atrocities in Cambodia and Latin America, along with issues like bullying and hate crimes. The museum has an associated museum and professional development multi-media training facility in New York City.

== Overview ==
The original museum in Los Angeles, California, opened in 1993. It was built at a cost of $50 million by the Simon Wiesenthal Center, named after its founder Simon Wiesenthal, a Holocaust survivor and Nazi hunter. The museum receives 350,000 visitors annually, about a third of which are school-age children. The museum's most talked-about exhibit is "The Holocaust Section", where visitors are divided into groups to take their own place in some of the events of World War II. The museum also features testimonies of Holocaust survivors, often from live volunteers who tell their stories and answer questions. People also get cards with pictures of Jewish children on them and at the end of the museum trip, it is revealed whether the child on the card survived or was murdered in the Holocaust.

In addition, the museum features a "Tolerancenter" that discusses issues of prejudice in everyday life, a Multimedia Learning Center, Finding Our Families – Finding Ourselves, a collection of archives and documents, various temporary exhibits such as Los Angeles visual artist Bill Cormalis Jr's "'A' Game In The B Leagues", which documents through paintings, the Civil Rights Movement during the segregation of colored people in Major League Baseball, and an Arts and Lectures Program.

A classroom visit to the museum is featured in the 2007 movie Freedom Writers, based on the real-life story of high school teacher Erin Gruwell and her students. The museum was parodied in the 2002 South Park episode "The Death Camp of Tolerance".

Over 350,000 people visit the museum annually, including 110,000 children. The museum is closed on Saturdays, the Jewish day of rest and on all major Jewish holidays and United States public holidays.

== Education ==
The museum runs a program called The Museums Tools for Tolerance (r) for Law Enforcement and Criminal Justice Professional. Through its inception in 1996, it has trained over 75,000 law enforcement officers. The success of the program led to the creation of the New York Tolerance Center.

== Criticism ==
In the past, some journalists and academics have criticized the way the Museum deals with its exhibits; Oren Baruch Stier, who specializes in Holocaust research and Jewish studies, criticized the museum in 1996 for not contextualizing the Holocaust. He argued against the separation of the museum's "tolerance" section and its area dedicated to the Holocaust. In 2003, Christopher Reynolds wrote, for the Los Angeles Times, that the museum lacked any exhibit about the Armenian genocide. Political theorist Wendy Brown critiqued the museum in a chapter of her 2009 book Regulating Aversion: Tolerance in the Age of Identity and Empire; in the book, Brown analyzed "tolerance as a museum object." She thought that the experience of the museum could make its visitors more vigilant against social prejudice and stereotyping.

== See also ==
- Museum of Tolerance and Human Dignity in Jerusalem
- United States Holocaust Memorial Museum
- Simon Wiesenthal Center
