= David Sun (businessman) =

Taiwanese-American Billionaire

- Born: October 12, 1951 (age 74); Taiwan
- Education: Tatung University
- Occupations: Co-founder and COO of Kingston Technology
- Spouse: Diana Sun

David Sun (Chinese: 孫大衛; pinyin: Sūn Dàwèi; born 12 October 1951) is a Taiwanese-American businessman and billionaire businessman. He is the co-founder and COO of Kingston Technology. As of June 2026, Sun is worth over $103 billion, making him the 19th richest person in the world, per Bloomberg Billionaires Index.

== Career ==
In 1982, Sun and John Tu co-founded Camintonn, a computer memory business, out of a garage. with David Sun. In 1986, the pair sold the company for $6 million to now defunct PC maker AST Research. However, the following year, both lost most their fortune in the 1987 stock market crash and founded Kingston Technology later that same year.

Sun and Tu founded a new company called Kingston Technology, which produces storage and memory modules, in 1987. In 1996, they sold 80 percent of the company to Softbank for $1.5 billion, before buying it back in 1999 for $450 million.

In 2001, Sun founded the David and Diana Sun Foundation, which contributes towards education and healthcare, mainly in Taiwan.

== Personal life ==
David Sun was born in October 1951 in Taiwan and was educated at Tatung University. He moved to the United States in 1977.

He is married with two children and lives in Irvine, California.
