= K-PEX 100 =

K-Pex 100
- Manufacturer: Kingston
- Type: Portable media player
- Lifespan: since 2006
- Media: 1 or 2 GB flash memory, miniSD expansion slot
- Operating system: K-Pex UI
- Display: 2" backlit TFT screen resolution 220x176
- Input: Power button, D-pad, "Play" "Select" "Menu" "Esc" buttons
- Connectivity: USB 2.0
- Dimensions: 3.74" x 1.79" x 0.57" (95mm x 45.5mm x 14.5mm); 2.3 oz. (65 g)

The K-Pex 100 (Kingston Portable Entertainment eXperience) is a portable media player produced by Kingston Technologies. It is capable of playing transcoded videos (MPX), viewing still images (JPEG), and playing music files (MP3, WMA). It also comes with 2 games. It is a rebranded Cenix GMP-M6, which is from Korea. Production of the K-PEX has been discontinued.

== Supported formats ==
The Kingston K-Pex-100 is capable of playing various formats of audio, video, picture, and game files.

=== Audio formats ===
MP3, WAV, WMA (protected), Ogg (Q10)

=== Video formats ===
WMV, ASF, MPEG 1 & 2, and AVI can be transcoded into the supported MPX format. The .mpx format is based on the mp4 format. It is unclear what codec it uses for both video and audio. The transcoded files are transcoded to the exact size of the screen to ensure minimum file size.

=== Picture formats ===
JPEG

=== Game formats ===
SGS
