= Young Storytellers =

Arts education non-profit in Los Angeles, USA

Young Storytellers, formerly known as the Young Storytellers Foundation, is an arts education non-profit operating primarily in Los Angeles.

Young Storytellers currently serves elementary, middle, and high school students in Southern California, including the cities of Los Angeles, Culver City, Santa Monica, Burbank, New York City, Austin, Little Rock, and Akron. Young Storytellers supports students in Title 1 schools; these are schools and school districts with the highest concentrations of poverty in which academic performance tends to be low and the obstacles to raising performance are the greatest. The program improves writing and self-confidence while also focusing on social and emotional learning and including components of Learning for Justice's Social Justice Standards.

== History ==
Young Storytellers began as an in-school mentoring program in 1997. The company was founded by three screenwriters Mikkel Bondesen, Brad Falchuk, and Andrew Barrett upon learning about cutbacks in funding for creative arts programs in the Los Angeles public schools. The first school adopted into the program was Playa Del Rey Elementary School in Culver City. The program was incorporated as a 501(c)(3) in 2003.

== Programs ==
The organization supports students elementary, middle, and high school.

=== Script to Stage ===
This 9-week, Common Core-aligned elementary school program places students with an adult mentor one-on-one to write scripts that are entirely their own, then actors perform those for the students and their peers live at a show.

== Volunteers ==
Programs are run by volunteer Head Mentors and volunteer Mentors. Mentors in the Script to Stage Program work one-on-one with a student for the duration of the nine-week program to create a screenplay and the resulting screenplay is then performed by a volunteer performer. There are currently over 1,200 volunteers in Los Angeles serving more than 2,000 students in 60 schools.

== Funding ==
The organization received grants from the Hollywood Foreign Press Association multiple times. In 2013 the organization was represented by Olivia Wilde and received a portion of the $1.6 million in grants given by the HFPA that year. 2016 in the amount of $10,000.

In 2015, the organization received a grant from the $4.5 million given to the Los Angeles arts scene from Michael Bloomberg Philanthropies. Jane Fonda's, Georgia Campaign for Adolescent Power & Potential, has also provided funding.

== Notable partnerships ==
In 2016, 20th Century Fox invited Young Storytellers students to participate in the Fox Writers Intensive.

March 2017, Young Storytellers partnered with Disney to give a group of students early access to see the live action version of Beauty and the Beast These students then created their own stories based on the film. Then, in collaboration with Tongal, an independent creative network, the students’ stories were turned into live action and animated short films.

In February 2018, a group of Young Storytellers students were invited to a special premier of Disney's A Wrinkle in Time and given the opportunity to create and then share stories based on the film. Disney then turned these stories into either short films or live performances to highlight the students’ storytelling.

In October 2020, Young Storytellers partnered with Netflix to have members of the Over the Moon cast host a dramatic reading of a student's story.

== See also ==
- Freedom Writers Foundation
- Story Pirates
