= Trainwreck: My Life as an Idiot =

- Trainwreck: My Life as an Idiot theatrical poster
- Directed by: Tod Harrison Williams
- Written by: Tod Harrison Williams; Jeff Nichols
- Produced by: Al Hayes; Jennifer Roth; Tod Williams; Anne Carey; Robert Delp; Daniel Sadek; Elie Samaha
- Starring: Seann William Scott; Jeff Garlin; Gretchen Mol; Deirdre O'Connell; Denis O'Hare
- Music by: Marcelo Zarvos
- Distributed by: Chicago Pictures Distribution
- Release dates: June 14, 2007 (Seattle International Film Festival); August 19, 2008 (United States)
- Running time: 94 minutes
- Country: United States
- Language: English

Trainwreck: My Life as an Idiot, also known as Trainwreck: My Life as an Idoit [sic] and American Loser, is a 2007 American comedy-drama film written and directed by Tod Harrison Williams and based upon the autobiographical book The Little Yellow Bus by Jeff Nichols. It is also known as American Loser, its American DVD and television title.

The film was premiered at the Seattle International Film Festival on 14 June 2007 and put on general release in the United States on 19 September 2008.

== Plot ==
Approaching his thirties, Jeff (Seann William Scott) has a heavy drinking problem coupled with ADHD, dyslexia, and a mild case of Tourette syndrome. He spends most of his time attending support meetings including ones which have no connection to the problems he suffers.

Jeff's attempts to hold down a job end in disaster. Jeff connects with Lynn (Gretchen Mol), a woman he met at a support group for people with relationship problems, but loses her when an expensive necklace he gives her as a gift is repossessed. Jeff rents a garage from his step brother Uncle, whom he knows as "Uncle Popcorn", only to fall behind on the rent. His car is repeatedly ticketed. Jeff's parents Cynthia (Deirdre O'Connell) and Mike (Denis O'Hare) try to support him, but even the simple instructions they give him drive Jeff to distraction. After being evicted from Bert's garage, and with nowhere else to go, Jeff sneaks back into his parents' expensive home. With no one else at home, and not wanting to cause a spike in the heating bill, Jeff uses a space heater, and accidentally burns down the house. The next morning, Jeff's parents stare at the charred wreckage of their home, baffled at the cause of the fire. Jeff's parents guess that the cause was faulty wiring. Jeff admits he burned the house down. Jeff's mother, shocked, enters the scorched remains and recovers the remains of a striped bass that Jeff caught years ago. The scene cuts to Jeff at a support group, where his tale of wrecked lives and repeated failures drives the others in the group to laughter. The support group is replaced with an audience taking in Jeff's account as a stand-up act, and loving it. Jeff tells his family that stand-up doesn't pay well, but that he has a new job.

In the final scene, a more mature Jeff is shown by a pier, getting ready to take a boat (presumably his own) out to fish. There he is visited by Lynn, now pregnant. Lynn, realizing that Jeff is improving, reconnects with him, and they go fishing.

== Cast ==
- Seann William Scott as Jeff Nichols
- Gretchen Mol as Lynn
- Deirdre O'Connell as Cynthia Nichols
- Kevin Conway as Bert
- Jeff Garlin as Lenny
- Denis O'Hare as Mike Nichols
- Stephen Adly Guirgis as Al, The Captain
- Charlie Tahan as Jeff Nichols As A Child
- Tonye Patano as Mrs. Shelby
- Adrian Martinez as Harris
