= Zlata Filipović =

Bosnian-Irish diarist

- Born: 3 December 1980 (age 45); Sarajevo, SR Bosnia and Herzegovina, SFR Yugoslavia
- Occupations: Writer and film producer
- Writing career
- Notable work: Zlata's Diary

Zlata Filipović (born 3 December 1980) is a Bosnian-Irish diarist. She kept a diary from 1991 to 1993 when she was a child living in Sarajevo during the Bosnian War, later published as a book.

== Biography ==
The only child of an advocate and a chemist, Filipović grew up in a middle-class family. From September 1991 to October 1993, she wrote in her diary, Mimmy, about the horrors of the siege of Sarajevo during the Bosnian War, through which she lived. The book, Zlata's Diary, was published in France and translated into over 36 languages worldwide.

Filipović and her family survived and escaped to Paris, in 1993 where they stayed for a year. She attended St. Andrew's College, Dublin (a senior school), going on to graduate from the University of Oxford in 2001 with a BA in human sciences, and has lived in Dublin, Ireland since October 1995, where she studied at Trinity College Dublin.

Filipović has continued to write. She wrote the foreword to The Freedom Writers Diary and co-edited Stolen Voices: Young People's War Diaries, From World War I to Iraq. She appeared on the Canadian version of the talk show Tout le monde en parle on 19 November 2006. As of 2016, she lives in Dublin, Ireland, working in the field of documentary and other film production.

== Works ==
- Zlata's Diary. 1992. ISBN 0-14-024205-8.

=== Chapters ===
- "Foreword". The Freedom Writers Diary. 1999.
- "Article 4, "Lost in Arizona"". From the Republic of Conscience: Stories Inspired by the Universal Declaration of Human Rights. 2009.
- "Chapter Six, "Hear Our Voices: Experiences of Conflict-Affected Children"". Even in Chaos: Education in Times of Emergency. 2010.

=== Translations and edited works ===
- "Preface". Milošević: The People's Tyrant. 2004.; English translation by Zlata Filipović
- Stolen Voices: Young People's War Diaries, from World War I to Iraq. 2006., co-edited by Zlata Filipović

== Activism ==
In 2011, Filipović produced the short film Stand Up! for the Stand Up! campaign created by BeLonG To, an LGBTQ youth service organisation in Ireland against homophobic bullying in schools. It has been viewed over 1.6 million times on YouTube.

Filipović served on the executive committee of Amnesty International Ireland (2007–13) and is a founding member of NYPAW (Network of Young People Affected by War). She has spoken extensively at schools and universities around the world on issues of children in conflict. She was a member of the UNESCO Jury for the Prize for Children and Young People's Literature for Tolerance, and is a recipient of the Child of Courage Award by the Simon Wiesenthal Centre in Los Angeles (1994).

=== Production ===
==== Select Short Films ====
- 2011: Hold on Tight
- 2011: Stand up
- 2012: Motion Sickness
- 2014: Stand up for your friends
- 2016: OCD and Me
- 2016: The Wake
- 2017: Bittersweet (documentary)
- 2018: Johnny (documentary)
- 2019: Strong at the Broken Places
- 2020: Welcome To A Bright White Limbo (Irish Film and Television Academy Awards - Best Short Film)
- 2024: Two Mothers (awarded Netflix Documentary Talent Fund support)

==== Select Documentary ====
- 2012: Three Men Go to War
- 2013: Here Was Cuba
- 2014: Somebody to love
- 2016: The Farthest
- 2016: The Story of Yes
- 2017: The Farthest (Emmy award winner)
- 2020: When Women Won
- 2022: How To Tell A Secret

==== Select Television ====
- 2010: Blood of the Irish (series documentary)
- 2017: The Babymakers (series documentary)
- 2018: The Game: The Story of Hurling (series documentary)
- 2020: You, Me and Surrogacy (series documentary)
- 2022: Epic West (series documentary)
