= The Freedom Writers Diary =

1999 non-fiction book

- Author: The Freedom Writers with Erin Gruwell
- Language: English
- Subject: Life Stories
- Genre: Non-fiction
- Publisher: Doubleday
- Publication date: 1999
- Publication place: United States
- Pages: 277pp

The Freedom Writers Diary: How a Teacher and 150 Teens Used Writing to Change Themselves and the World Around Them is a non-fiction 1999 book written by The Freedom Writers, a group of students from Woodrow Wilson High School in Long Beach, California, and their teacher Erin Gruwell. It is the basis of the 2007 movie Freedom Writers, starring Hilary Swank.

The Freedom Writers Diary was made up of journals that Erin Gruwell told her students to write in about the troubles of their past, present and future. The Freedom Writers name pays homage to the name of the 1960s civil rights group Freedom Riders.

After intercepting a racist drawing from one of her students, Gruwell compared the drawings to Nazi propaganda techniques. She drew blank stares; only one of them had heard of the Holocaust. As a result, she assigned them to read and write about the posthumously published 1947 book The Diary of Anne Frank (written between 1942 and 1944) and the 1992–93 non-fiction book by Zlata Filipović, Zlata's Diary: A Child's Life in Sarajevo.

The Freedom Writers Foundation continued with exercises and philosophies similar to those used in the original class, and tracks the progress of the original and continuing classes.

== Plot summary ==
As an idealistic 23-year-old English teacher at Wilson High School in Long Beach, California, Erin Gruwell confronted a room of "unteachable, at-risk" students. One day she intercepted a note with a racial caricature, and angrily declared that this was precisely the sort of thing that led to the Holocaust – only to be met by uncomprehending looks. So she and her students, using the treasured books Anne Frank: The Diary of a Young Girl and Zlata's Diary: A Child's Life in Sarajevo as their guides, undertook a life-changing, eye-opening, spirit-raising odyssey against intolerance and misunderstanding. They learned to see the parallels between these books and their own lives, recording their thoughts and feelings in diaries and dubbing themselves the "Freedom Writers" in homage to the civil rights activists "The Freedom Riders".

With funds raised by a "Read-a-thon for Tolerance", they arranged for Miep Gies, the Dutch woman who sheltered the Frank family, to visit them in California during the 1994/1995 school year, where she declared that Erin Gruwell's students were "the real heroes." Their efforts have paid off spectacularly, both in terms of recognition – appearances on Primetime Live and All Things Considered, coverage in People magazine, a meeting with U.S. Secretary of Education Richard Riley – and educational benefit. All 150 Freedom Writers graduated from high school and many went on to attend college.

== Banning of the book in schools ==
On March 11, 2008, an English teacher at Perry Meridian High School in Indianapolis, Indiana, Connie Heermann, was suspended for a year and a half without pay for using the Freedom Writers Diary in her classroom against the wishes of the school board. Administrators objected to racial slurs and sexual content in portions of the book.

In March 2023, the book was removed from public school libraries in Martin County, Florida.

In June 2023, Utah State Senator John D. Johnson called the book pornographic and said that high schools are committing the felony of "accessory to the distribution of pornography to minors" if they have the book available to students.
