= Freedom Writers =

2007 drama film by Richard LaGravenese

- Theatrical release poster
- Directed by: Richard LaGravenese
- Screenplay by: Richard LaGravenese
- Based on: The Freedom Writers Diary by The Freedom Writers with Erin Gruwell
- Produced by: Danny DeVito; Michael Shamberg; Stacey Sher
- Starring: Hilary Swank; Scott Glenn; Imelda Staunton; Patrick Dempsey; Mario
- Cinematography: Jim Denault
- Edited by: David Moritz
- Music by: Mark Isham; will.i.am
- Production companies: MTV Films; Jersey Films; Double Feature Films
- Distributed by: Paramount Pictures
- Release dates: January 4, 2007 (Westwood Village Theatre); January 5, 2007 (United States)
- Running time: 123 minutes
- Country: United States
- Language: English
- Budget: $21 million
- Box office: $43.6 million

Freedom Writers is a 2007 American biographical drama film written and directed by Richard LaGravenese and starring Hilary Swank, Scott Glenn, Imelda Staunton, Patrick Dempsey and Mario.

It is based on the 1999 book The Freedom Writers Diary by teacher Erin Gruwell and students who compiled the book out of real diary entries about their lives that they wrote in their English class at Woodrow Wilson Classical High School in Long Beach, California. The movie is also based on the DC program called City at Peace. The title of the movie and book is a play on the term "Freedom Riders," referring to the multiracial civil rights activists who tested the U.S. Supreme Court decision ordering the desegregation of interstate buses in 1961.

The idea for the film came from journalist Tracey Durning, who made a documentary about Erin Gruwell for the ABC News program Primetime Live. Durning served as co-executive producer of the film. The film was dedicated to the memory of actor Armand Jones, who was killed after filming Freedom Writers. He was fatally shot at age 18 in Anaheim, California, after a confrontation with a man who robbed Jones of a necklace in a Denny's restaurant.

Freedom Writers premiered at the Westwood Village Theatre on January 4, 2007, and was theatrically released the following day in the United States by Paramount Pictures. It received positive reviews from critics and was a modest box-office success, grossing $43.6 million worldwide on a budget of $21 million.

== Plot ==
In 1994, in Long Beach, California, Erin Gruwell has been hired to teach Freshman English for at-risk students at Woodrow Wilson High School, a formerly prestigious school that has declined since voluntary integration had been enforced and where racial tension has increased since the Los Angeles riots two years before. Erin struggles to form a connection with her students and observes numerous fights between some of them, who are in rival gangs. She attempts to instill respect, but they ignore her and continue to be disruptive in class. The second day of school, much of the student body is involved in a massive brawl when one of Erin's Hispanic students Eva Benitez lets her boyfriend Paco onto the campus with their fellow gang members. Erin goes home upset and distraught as she had witnessed another one of her Hispanic students Alejandro Santiago bring a gun to school.

One night, Eva goes into a convenience store while Paco and two other friends stay in the car. Her classmate and rival Sindy Ngor, who is a Cambodian refugee, her boyfriend, and another friend also enter the store. African American student Grant Rice, frustrated about losing an arcade game, demands a refund from the store owner. The store owner becomes angry with Grant in return and orders him to leave the store. As Grant storms out, Paco (as retaliation for losing a fight against him during the school brawl earlier) attempts to gun him down, but misses and accidentally kills Sindy's boyfriend, while Grant flees the scene and is later arrested for the homicide. As a witness, Eva must testify in court; she intends to guard "her own" in her testimony and protect Paco.

The next day at school, Erin examines a racist drawing by her student Tito and utilizes it to teach the class about the Holocaust, which everyone, except for Caucasian student Ben Samuels, has no knowledge of. Erin has them play a game called "the line game," and by seeing that they have all been through traumatic experiences, the students start becoming closer to one another. Erin gradually begins to earn their trust and buys composition books for them to use as diaries, in which they write about their experiences of being evicted, being abused, and seeing their loved ones die.

Determined to reform her students, Erin takes on two part-time jobs to pay for more books and activities and spends more time at school, much to the disappointment of her husband, Scott. He tells her he is unhappy because she didn't consult him about the new jobs. A personal transformation is specifically visible in one student, Marcus. He uses his borrowed library books to learn more about the Holocaust.

Erin invites several Jewish Holocaust survivors to talk with her class about their experiences and requires the students to attend a field trip to the Museum of Tolerance. The students start to realize that being different races should not be a reason to prohibit friendships between one another. Meanwhile, her unique training methods are scorned by her colleagues and department chair, Margaret Campbell.

The following school year comes, and Erin teaches her class (now sophomores) again, making it the second year she is their teacher. On the first day, Erin makes her class propose a "Toast for Change," allowing everyone to open up about their struggles and what they wish to change about themselves. Later on, the class makes enough money to have Miep Gies come to the United States and tell her story of her helping Anne Frank, her family, and the Van Pels hide from the Nazis; she then also persuades the students that they are heroes and that they "within their own small ways, [can] turn on a small light in a dark room."

These two events inspire Eva to tell the truth, breaking free of her father's demands of always protecting her own. At Grant's trial, she shocks the courtroom by revealing that Paco actually killed Sindy's boyfriend at the scene; Grant is spared while Paco is convicted, and Sindy later forgives Eva. Afterward, Eva is attacked and threatened by her fellow gang members, but is ultimately spared because of her father and they dissociate from her. She subsequently moves in with her aunt for safety.

Meanwhile, Erin asks her students to write their diaries in book form. She compiles the entries and names it The Freedom Writers Diary. Scott, who abandoned his dream of becoming an architect, divorces her over feeling overshadowed by her accomplishments. Margaret tells her she cannot teach her kids for their junior year. After being encouraged by her father, a former civil rights activist, Erin fights this decision, eventually convincing the superintendent to permit her to teach her kids during their junior and senior years, much to their elation.

The film ends with a note that Erin successfully prepared numerous high school students to graduate and attend college – for many, the first in their families to do so.

== Cast ==
- Hilary Swank as Erin Gruwell
- Scott Glenn as Steve Gruwell
- Imelda Staunton as Margaret Campbell
- Patrick Dempsey as Scott Casey
- Mario as Andre Bryant
- April Lee Hernandez as Eva Benitez
- Robert Wisdom as Dr. Carl Cohn
- John Benjamin Hickey as Brian Gelford
- Pat Carroll as Miep Gies
- Hunter Parrish as Ben Daniels
- Jason Finn as Marcus
- Vanetta Smith as Brandy Ross
- Antonio Garcia as Miguel
- Jaclyn Ngan as Sindy Ngor
- Armand Jones as Grant Rice
- Kristin Herrera as Gloria Munez
- Gabriel Chavarria as Tito
- Giovonnie Samuels as Victoria
- Deance Wyatt as Jamal Hill
- Sergio Montalvo as Alejandro Santiago
- Will Morales as Paco
- Ricardo Molina as Mr. Benitez, Eva's father
- Angela Alvarado as Mrs. Benitez, Eva's mother
- Lisa Banes as Karin Polachek

== Release ==
Freedom Writers premiered at the Westwood Village Theatre in Westwood, Los Angeles on January 4, 2007, before it was theatrically released the following day by Paramount Pictures.

== Reception ==
=== Box office ===
Freedom Writers grossed $36.6 million domestically, and $7 million overseas, for a worldwide total of $43.6 million. It was produced on a budget of $21 million. The film opened on January 5, 2007, and made $9.4 million in its first weekend, ranking at fourth place.

=== Critical response ===
Freedom Writers has received mostly positive reviews from critics. On the review aggregator website Rotten Tomatoes, 69% of 124 critics' reviews are positive, with an average rating of 6.3/10. The website's consensus reads: "Freedom Writers is a frank, formulaic entry in the inspirational inner-city teacher genre, with an energetic Hilary Swank leading the appealing cast of unknowns." Another review aggregator, Metacritic, which assigns a weighted average score out of 100 to reviews from mainstream critics, calculated an average score of 64/100 based on 29 reviews, indicating "generally favorable" reviews. Audiences polled by CinemaScore gave the film an average grade of "A" on an A+ to F scale.

Cynthia Fuchs of Common Sense Media gave the film three out of five stars, writing in her review that "the plot is predictable, the actors too old to play high school students, and the pacing too slow. And really, the camera circles around deep-thinking faces a few too many times. But Freedom Writers also argues for listening to teenagers. That in itself makes it a rare and close-to-wonderful thing." The film received a positive rating from Fox Weekly, giving the film a 9 out of 10.

== Legacy ==
Since its release, Freedom Writers has become a topic of conversation in the reshaping of teaching styles, especially in classrooms with at-risk children. Following the success of The Freedom Writers Diary, Erin Gruwell founded the Freedom Writers Foundation. The non-profit encourages a more diverse and inclusive classroom experience with the specific goal of providing further educational opportunities for minority and at-risk students. Gruwell, the original Freedom Writers featured in the book (many of whom are now educators), and other educators have crafted training programs for educators to help their students succeed and pursue higher education.

Gruwell also developed a curriculum of books for educators to serve as resources to implement the Freedom Writers Method of teaching in more classrooms. The books in the series include The Freedom Writers Diary, Teaching Hope (written by Gruwell and other Freedom Writers teachers), Teach with Your Heart (Gruwell's personal memoir), and The Freedom Writers Diary Teacher's Guide (a classroom resource for teachers looking to implement the Freedom Writers Method in their classrooms).

== Soundtrack ==
Common lent his music to the soundtrack with "A Dream", featuring and produced by The Black Eyed Peas member will.i.am and Grammy Winning violinist Miri Ben-Ari. The soundtrack also includes the Tupac Shakur song "Keep Ya Head Up".

Instrumental sections of Sia's "Breathe Me" accompany the film's television trailer.

The Freedom Writers soundtrack contains the following songs:

- "A Dream" by Common featuring will.i.am
- "Listen!!!" by Talib Kweli
- "It's R Time" by Jeannie Ortega
- "When the Ship Goes Down" by Cypress Hill
- "Hip Hop Hooray" by Naughty by Nature
- "Keep Ya Head Up" by 2Pac
- "Code of the Streets" by Gang Starr
- "Rebirth of Slick (Cool Like Dat)" by Digable Planets
- "Officer" by Pharcyde
- "This Is How We Do It" by Montell Jordan
- "Colours" by will.i.am
- "Bus Ride" by will.i.am
- "Riots" by Miri Ben-Ari and will.i.am
- "Eva's Theme" by Mark Isham
- "Anne Frank" by Miri Ben-Ari and Mark Isham

== See also ==
- List of hood films
