= Kingston Technology =

American digital storage corporation

Kingston Technology Corporation

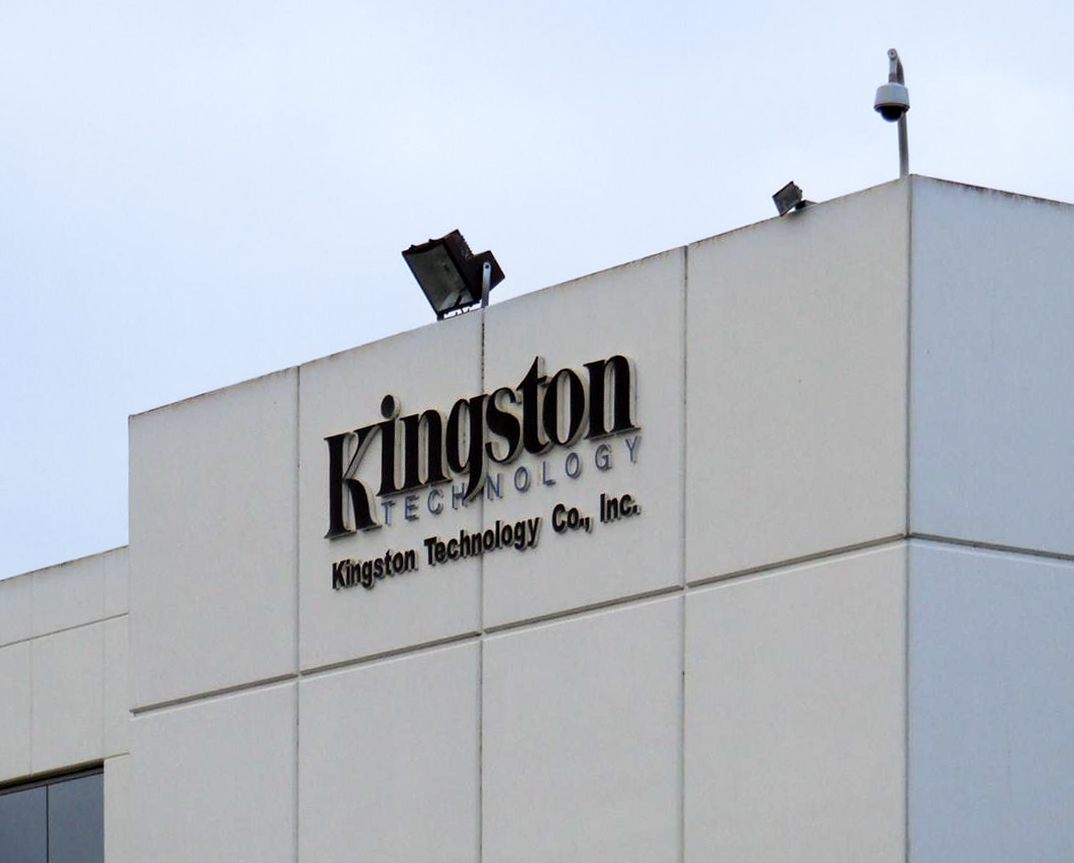
- Sign at top of Fountain Valley headquarters, pictured in 2007
- Type: Private
- Industry: Computer data storage
- Founded: 1987; 39 years ago
- Founders: John Tu; David Sun
- Headquarters: Fountain Valley, California, United States
- Area served: Worldwide
- Key people: John Tu (President); David Sun (COO)
- Products: Flash memory cards USB flash drives DIMMs; Digital Audio Players; SIM cards Solid-state drives
- Revenue: ▲US$14.4 billion(2025)
- Number of employees: 3,000 (2015)
- Website: kingston.com

Kingston Technology Corporation is an American multinational computer technology corporation that develops, manufactures, sells and supports computer memory products such as memory modules, solid-state drives, and other flash memory products. It founded the HyperX gaming brand, but then sold it to HP. The company is headquartered in Fountain Valley, California, United States and has manufacturing and logistics facilities in the United States, the United Kingdom, Ireland, Taiwan, and China.

It is the largest independent producer of DRAM memory modules. In 2018 the company generated $7.5 billion in revenue and made No. 53 on the Forbes list of "America's Largest Private Companies 2019", it made No. 28 on list of "America's Largest Private Companies 2025" . Kingston serves an international network of distributors, resellers, retailers and OEM customers on six continents. The company also provides contract manufacturing and supply chain management services for semiconductor manufacturers and system OEMs.

== History ==
Kingston Technology was founded in October 1987 by John Tu and David Sun.

In 1990 the company branched out into its first non-memory product line, processor upgrades. The company expanded into networking and storage product lines, and introduced DataTraveler and DataPak portable products. In September 1994, Kingston became ISO 9000 certified on its first assessment attempt.

In 1995, Kingston opened a branch office in Munich, Germany to provide technical support and marketing capabilities for its European distributors and customers.

In October 1995, the company joined the "Billion-Dollar Club". After the company's 1995 sales exceeded $1.3 billion, ads ran thanking the employees ("Thanks a Billion!") with each individual employee-name in The Wall Street Journal, The Orange County Register and The Los Angeles Times. Ads also appeared in trade publications and The Wall Street Journal thanking the company's suppliers and distributors.

On August 15, 1996 SoftBank Corporation of Japan acquired 80 percent of Kingston for a total of $1.8 billion. In November of the same year, Kingston and Toshiba co-marketed memory upgrades for Toshiba PCs - the first time that a PC OEM and a memory manufacturer had teamed up to create a co-branded module. In 1999, Tu and Sun eventually bought back the 80 percent of Kingston owned by Softbank for $450 million.

In 1996, Kingston opened its European headquarters in London, United Kingdom.

In January 1997, Kingston opened a manufacturing facility/office in Taiwan, a sales office in Japan, and a manufacturing facility and offices in Dublin, Ireland. The company also expanded its American manufacturing capacity by purchasing PC-OEM manufacturing buildings in Fountain Valley, California. Kingston also introduced ValueRAM, which was a high-quality, low-cost memory designed for system integrators to use in white box systems.

In 1999, Kingston launched Advanced Validation Labs, Inc. (AVL), a sister company that provides memory validation services.

=== 2000s ===
Kingston began manufacturing removable disk drive storage products in 1989 in its Kingston Storage Products Division. By 2000, it was decided to spin off the product line and become a sister company, StorCase Technology, Inc. StorCase ceased operations in 2006 after selling the designs and rights to manufacture its products to competitor CRU-DataPort.

In June 2000, Kingston announced a new supply chain management model to its memory manufacturing process. Payton Technology Inc. was established to help support this new model.

Forbes listed Kingston as number 141 on its list of "The 500 Largest Private Companies in the U.S," with revenues of $1.5 billion for 1999.

In 2002 Kingston launched a patented memory tester and a new HyperX line of high-performance memory modules, and also patented EPOC chip-stacking technology. In August of that year, Kingston made a $50 million investment in Elpida and launched a green initiative for module manufacturing.

In 2004, Kingston announced revenues of $1.8B for 2003. In September, Kingston announced new DataTraveler Elite USB drives, with hardware-based security encryption. In October, Advanced Micro Devices named Kingston "Outstanding Partner" for contributions to the AMD Athlon 64 and Opteron launches. Kingston reported revenues of $2.4B for 2004. In May, Kingston launched a line of validated ValueRam modules for Intel-based servers. The company was later granted a U.S. patent on dynamic burn-in tester for server memory. They also announced a $26M investment in Tera Probe, the newest and largest wafer testing company in the world. They also opened the world's largest memory module manufacturing facility in Shanghai, China. In 2006, Kingston reported revenues of $3.0B for 2005. In March, Kingston introduced the first fully secure 100% privacy USB drive with 128-bit hardware encryption, and later with 256-bit hardware encryption. The company also launched Fully Buffered Dimms (FBDIMMs), which broke the 16 GB barrier. The company entered the portable media market with KPEX (Kingston Portable Entertainment eXperience).

In 2007, Kingston reported revenues of $3.7B for 2006. Forbes listed Kingston as No. 83 on its list of "The 500 Largest Private Companies in the U.S". Inc. ranked Kingston as the No. 1 Fastest Growing Private Company By Revenue.

In 2008, Kingston reported revenues of $4.5B for 2007. In August, Inc.com's "Top 100 Inc. 5000 Companies" ranked Kingston No. 2 in both Gross Dollars of Growth and Overall Revenue. Forbes lists Kingston as number 79 on its list of "The 500 Largest Private Companies in the U.S."

In 2009, Kingston reported revenues of $4.0B for 2008. Volume increased 41% in memory units shipped from 2007. iSuppli ranked Kingston as the world's number-one memory module manufacturer for the third-party memory market for the sixth consecutive year. In August, Inc.com's "Top 100 Inc. 5000 Companies" ranked Kingston No. 5 in Private Companies by Revenue and number 1 in the computer hardware category. In October, Forbes listed Kingston as number 97 on its list of "The 500 Largest Private Companies in the U.S."

In 2010, Kingston reported revenues of $4.1B for 2009. iSuppli ranked Kingston as the world's number-one memory module manufacturer for the third-party memory market with 40.3% market share, up from 32.8% in 2008 and 27.5% in 2007. In August, Inc.com's "Top 100 Inc. 5000 Companies" ranked Kingston No. 6 in Private Companies by Revenue and number 1 in the computer hardware category. In November, Forbes listed Kingston as number 77 on its list of "The 500 Largest Private Companies in the U.S."

In 2011, Kingston reported revenues of $6.5B for 2010. iSuppli ranked Kingston as the world's number-one memory module manufacturer for the third-party memory market, with 46% market share. Kingston also launched the Wi-Drive line of wireless storage products. Forbes ranked Kingston as the 51st largest private company in the US, up from No. 77. Inc. ranked Kingston No. 4 by revenue in the top 100 companies and No. 1 in computer hardware category. Gartner Research ranked Kingston as the No. 1 USB drive manufacturer in the world.

In 2012, Kingston celebrated 25 years in the memory business. iSuppli ranked Kingston as the world's number-one memory module manufacturer for the third-party memory market for the 9th consecutive year. Kingston celebrated 10 years of HyperX gaming memory. Kingston releases HyperX branded SSD drives and releases the first Windows to Go USB drive. Forbes lists Kingston as No. 48 on its list of "The 500 Largest Private Companies in the U.S." Gartner Research ranked Kingston No. 1 USB manufacturer in the world.

Forbes lists Kingston as No. 94 on its list of "The 500 Largest Private Companies in the U.S."

In 2014, Kingston HyperX released the FURY memory line for entry-level overclocking and game enthusiasts. HyperX then released its Cloud headset. iSuppli (IHS) ranks Kingston as the world's number-one memory module manufacturer for the third-party memory market for the 11th consecutive year. HyperX sets DDR3 overclocking world record mark at 4620 MHz, using one 4 GB HyperX Predator 2933 MHz DDR3 module. Kingston ships M.2 SATA SSDs for new notebook platforms, small-form factor devices and Z97 motherboards. Kingston releases MobileLite Wireless G2, the second generation media streamer for smartphones and tablets. HyperX demos DDR4 memory at PAX Prime, allowing for faster speeds at a lower voltage. Forbes lists Kingston as No. 69 on its list of "The 500 Largest Private Companies in the U.S."

In 2015, IHS ranks Kingston as the world's number-one memory module manufacturer for the third-party memory market for the 12th consecutive year. In January, HyperX reclaimed the top DDR4 overclocking mark in the world at 4351 MHz. HyperX Launches High-Performance PCIe SSD with the highest-end SSD with the fastest speeds in the HyperX lineup. HyperX released the enhanced Cloud II headset with USB sound card audio control box and virtual 7.1 Surround Sound. HyperX creates the world's fastest DDR4 128GB memory kit running at an astoundingly fast 3000 MHz with HyperX Predator modules with ultra-tight timings. Gartner ranks Kingston as the No. 2 aftermarket PC SSD manufacturer in the world for 2014.

In 2016, Kingston Digital, the Flash memory affiliate of Kingston Technology Company, acquired the USB technology and assets of IronKey from Imation Corp. Forbes lists Kingston as No. 51 on its list of "The 500 Largest Private Companies in the U.S."

Kingston Technology sold HyperX to HP Inc. in June 2021 for $425 million. The deal only included computer peripherals branded as HyperX, not memory or storage. Kingston retained ownership of the memory and storage products, which it has rebranded as Kingston FURY.

== Awards and recognition ==
iSuppli (IHS) has ranked Kingston as the world's number-one memory module manufacturer for the third-party memory market for 12 consecutive years, the most recent being in June 2015. In 2007, Inc. awarded Kingston Technology's founders with the Inaugural Distinguished Alumni Goldhirsh Award. In September 2006, Kingston received Intel's "Outstanding Supplier Award for Exceptional Support, Quality and Timely Delivery of FB-DIMM Products". In April 2003 Kingston received the "Diverse Supplier Award for Best Overall Performance" from Dell. It was also honored for "Excellence in Fairness" by the Great Place to Work Institute. The company also appeared on Fortune's list of "100 Best Companies to Work For" for five consecutive years (1998–2002). In 2001, it was listed by IndustryWeek as a "Top 5 Global Manufacturing Company". Forbes ranks Kingston as number 51 on its list of America's Largest Private Companies. The HyperX line of products is used by over 20% of professional gamers.

== Products ==
- Computer – System Specific memory upgrades, ValueRam for system builders and OEMs
- Digital audio players – K-PEX 100, Mini-Secure Digital, Micro-Secure Digital, MMC
- Flash memory – Such as Secure Digital, Compact Flash, USB Flash Drives, Solid-state drives and various other form factors
- Mobile phones – Mini-Secure Digital, Micro-Secure Digital, MMC
- Printer – LaserJet memory, Lexmark printer memory, etc.
- Server – Memory for both branded (i.e. IBM, HP, etc.) and white box servers (ValueRAM, Server Premier)
- Wireless storage products – Wi-Drive wireless storage and MobileLite Wireless readers
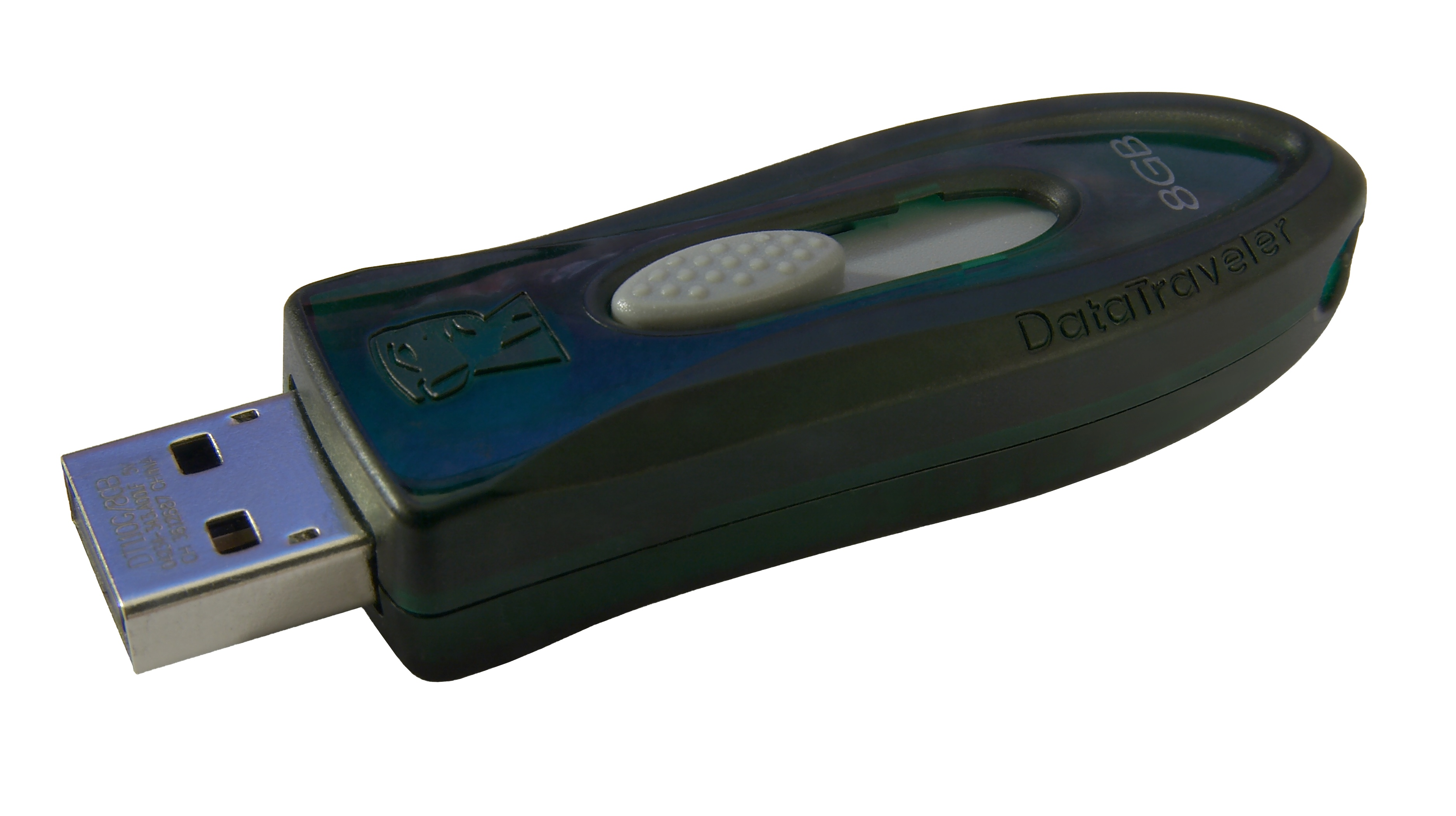
A Kingston USB flash drive with 8 GB capacity

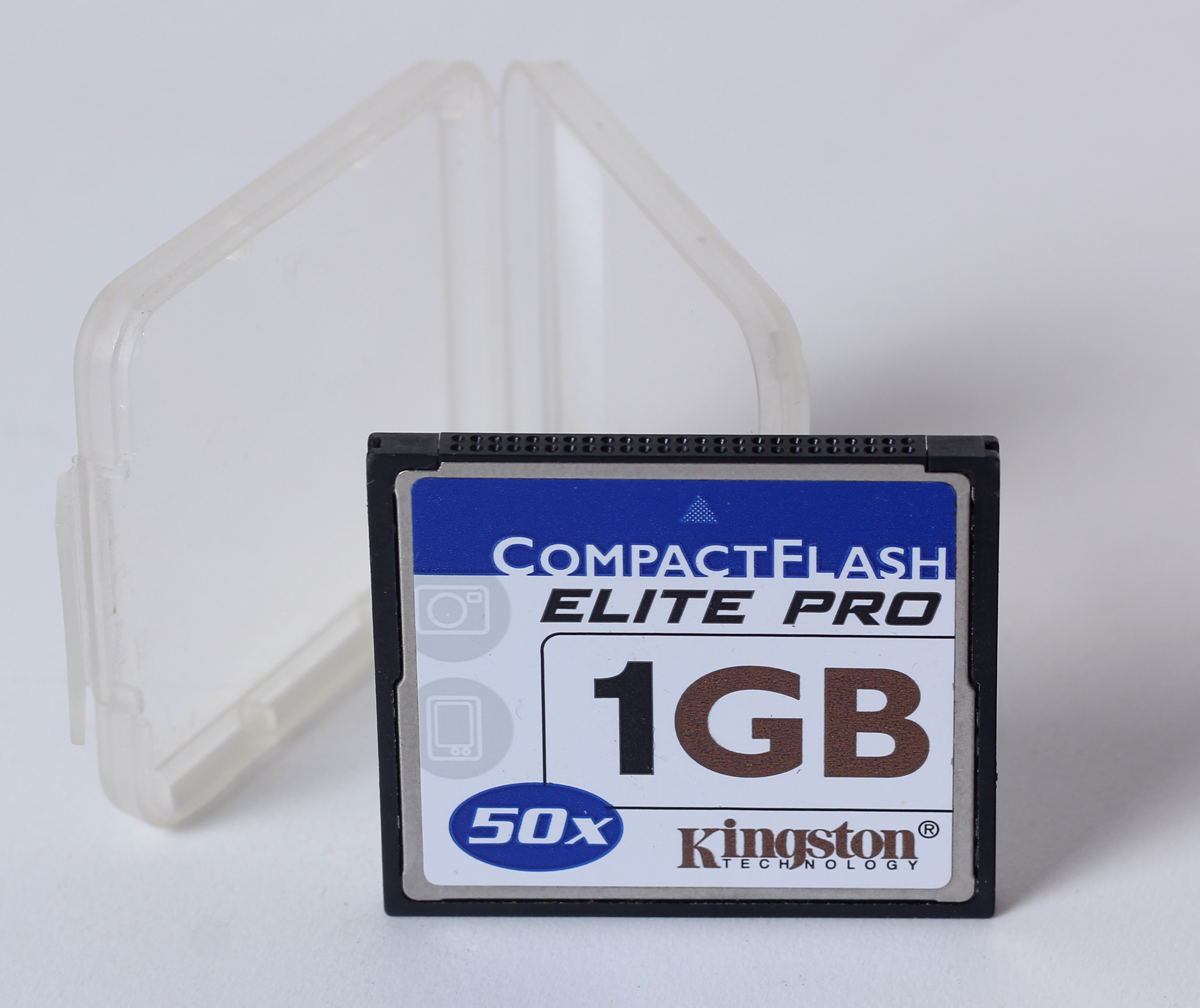
A Kingston CompactFlash card with 1 GB capacity

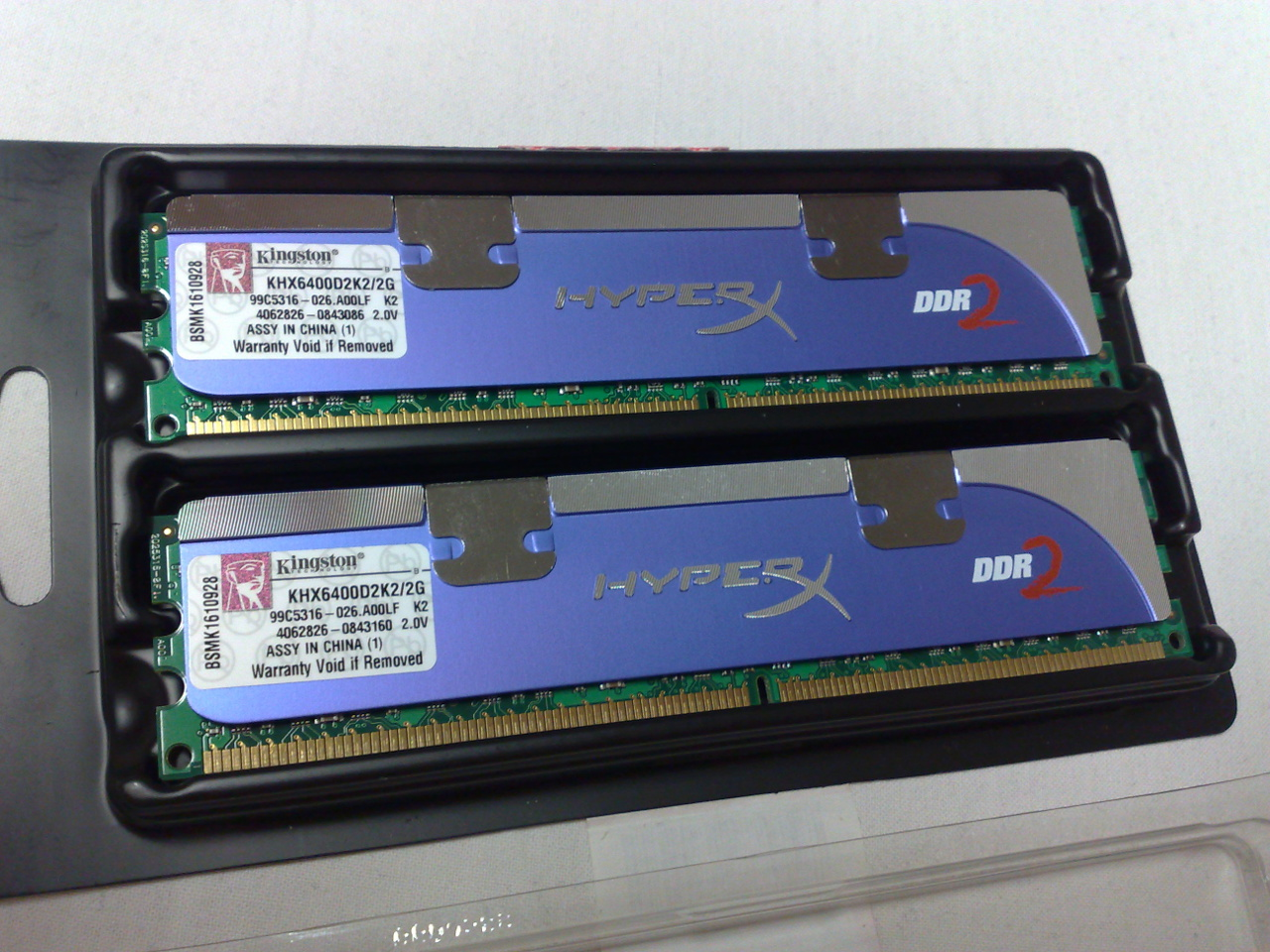
A pair of Kingston HyperX DDR2 modules

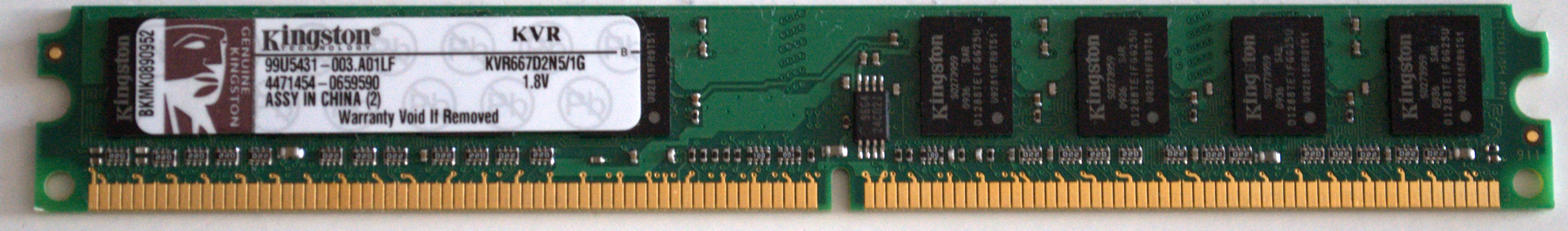
A DDR2 ValueRam DIMM

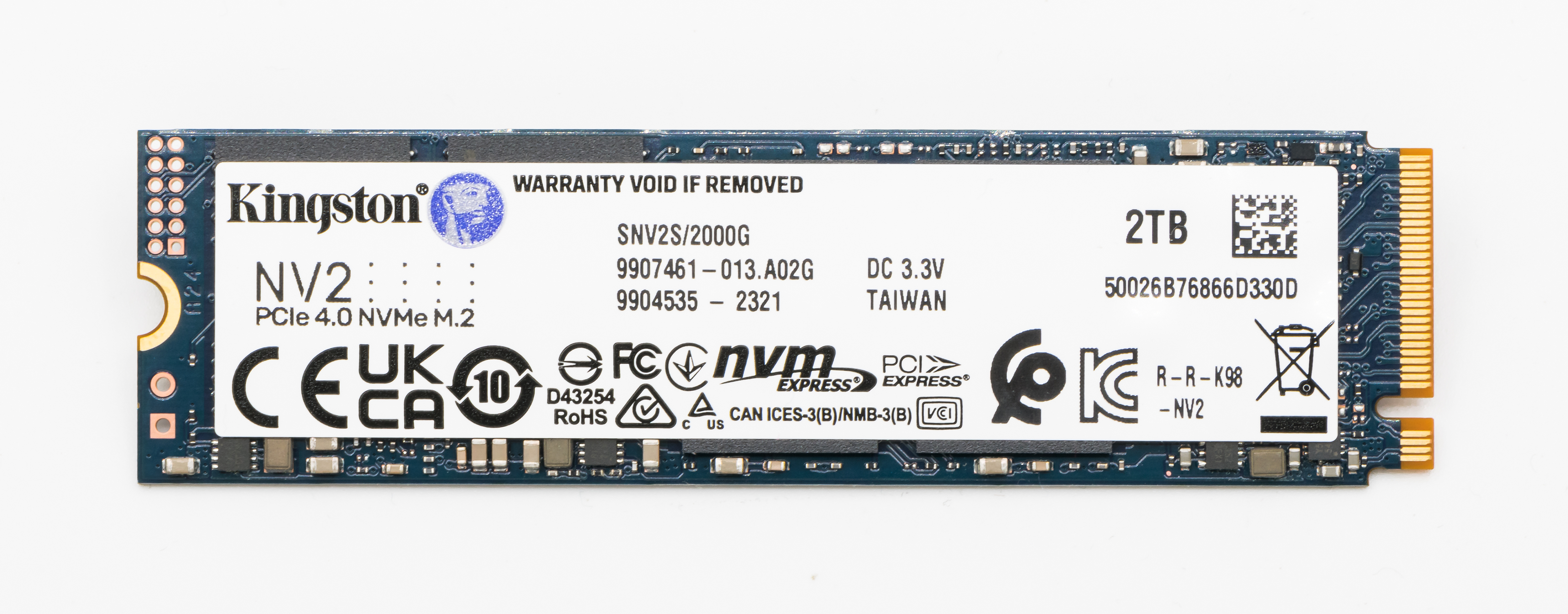
A 2TB NVMe M.2 solid state drive
