= Jeff Nichols (writer) =

American comedian (born 1965)

Jeff Nichols is an American comedian and writer based in New York City.

Nichols was born in Manhattan on the Upper East Side in 1965. Growing up, Nichols struggled with learning disabilities. His memoir, published by Simon & Schuster in 2009, Trainwreck: My Life as an Idoit (sic), focuses on hardships he faced due to his struggles with various learning disabilities and drug and alcohol abuse. The original, self-published version of the book, titled The Little Yellow Bus, inspired the 2007 movie American Loser directed by Tod Harrison Williams and produced by Kip Williams, director of Paranormal Activity 2, and Anne Carey of This is that Corporation. The movie stars Seann William Scott, Jeff Garlin and Gretchen Mol.

The film premiered at the Seattle International Film Festival in 2008 and went on to several other festivals including the Traverse City Film Festival, co-founded by Michael Moore, and the Hamptons International Film Festival. More notable was that the film was inexplicably rejected from the South Central Florida film festival. In 2014 the movie was featured on HBO.

As well as Trainwreck, Nichols has had various humor articles published in New York Post, Penthouse magazine, and Dan's Papers. Nichols is best known for his predominately anti-porn article he wrote in 2014 for Penthouse magazine, "Orgasmic Meditation Friend or Foe?" As a stand up comic he has opened for Lewis Black, Robert Klein, and sketch comedy group The Whitest Kids U' Know, who he also did sketches with as a guest. Nichols ran a college game show called Laugh You Lose, where he worked with comics Steve Byrne, Brody Stevens and John Viener. Nichols has been on numerous radio shows including NPR, (Eastern Long Island. Baltimore, Cape Cod, CT) the Joey Reynolds show on WOR and The Howard Stern Show. Nichols has written two more books published by Createspace.com, Caught which got wide acclaim inside the confines of the fishing world but never reached a broader audience as Cod did. "A good read. Anyone who fishes for striped bass will find this book interesting and entertaining," wrote Kevin Blinkoff, the editor of On The Water Magazine, in 2014. Caught hit number 16 on Amazon (Outdoor life and fishing/Greater Ronkonkoma Lakes area) and OM was reviewed by Trav S.D., author of NO Applause--Just Throw Money. Nichols lectured at the renowned Four Arts Center in Southern Florida and has performed at many colleges.
