= MPX Microsoft Project Exchange File Format =

MPX Microsoft Project File Exchange Format is a file format developed by Microsoft which was introduced with Microsoft Project 4.0 (1994) for sharing project data with other project management applications. It was adopted by other project management applications, such as Primavera Project Planner and Sciforma. Microsoft discontinued the ability to save in the MPX format with Microsoft Project 2000, but the ability to read the MPX format is supported up to Microsoft Project 2010.
