= Zlata's Diary =

1992 non-fiction book by Zlata Filipović

- 1995 edition
- Author: Zlata Filipović
- Publication date: 1992
- ISBN: 0-14-024205-8

Zlata's Diary: A Child's Life in Sarajevo (ISBN 0-14-024205-8) is a 1992 non-fiction book by Zlata Filipović, who was a young girl living in Sarajevo while it was under siege.

== Background ==
Zlata Filipović was born on 3 December 1980. She was living in Sarajevo before the Bosnian war started. During the war, Zlata kept a diary, which she named Mimmy, from 1991 to 1993. Zlata and her family escaped to Paris in 1993, where they stayed for a year before settling down in Dublin, Ireland.

== Content ==
Zlata Filipović was given a diary in September 1991, when she had just begun fifth grade, and wrote from 1991 to 1993 during the Bosnian war, which began just before her eleventh birthday. Zlata's diary chronicles her daily life and the war's increasing impact on her home town of Sarajevo.

Reporter Janine di Giovanni, who met Zlata in 1993 and wrote the introduction to the book, described Zlata as "the Anne Frank of Sarajevo." Like The Diary of Anne Frank, Zlata's diary contains many descriptions of the horrors of war as viewed from the innocent view of a child. Furthermore, both diaries take place during conflicts at least partially motivated by racism and ethnic differences.

== Publication ==
In 1992, a small press in Sarajevo published 45 pages of Zlata's diary and released it for the UNICEF week. Following the release of her diary, Zlata became moderately famous. International journalists visited the Filipović family's apartment and interviewed Zlata. In December 1993, the United Nations helped Zlata and her mother move to Paris.

Her diary has also been adapted into a choral work by Anthony Powers.

== Reception ==
Critical reception of the book was positive. In The New York Times Book Review, Francine Prose praised the "pure innocence and desperation" evident in the book, characterizing Zlata as an everygirl. However, Prose was critical of Western publishers looking to cash in by equating Zlata's story with that of Anne Frank, lamenting the indecency of "contrasting and judging the private writings of children in war".
