= Erin Gruwell =

American teacher (born 1969)

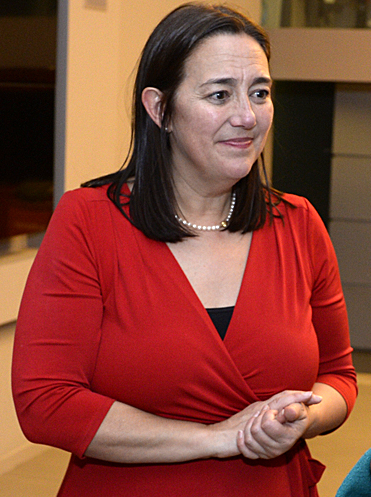
- Gruwell in 2015
- Born: August 15, 1969 (age 57); Glendora, California, U.S.
- Education: University of California, Irvine (BA); California State University, Long Beach (MA)
- Occupations: Executive Director at the Freedom Writers Foundation, Educator, Author, Social Activist, Podcaster

Erin Gruwell (born August 15, 1969) is an American teacher known for her unique teaching method, which led to the publication of The Freedom Writers Diary: How a Teacher and 150 Teens Used Writing to Change Themselves and the World Around Them (1999). The 2007 film Freedom Writers and the 2019 PBS documentary Freedom Writers: Stories from the Heart are based on her story.

== Early life and education ==
Erin Gruwell was born in Glendora, California to Stephen Douglass Gruwell, a former baseball scout for the Anaheim Angels, and Sandra Faye Alley. Her parents divorced when she was young. She graduated from Bonita High School in La Verne, California, and the University of California, Irvine, where she received the Lauds and Laurels Distinguished Alumni Award. She earned her master's degree and teaching credentials from California State University, Long Beach, where she was honored as Distinguished Alumna by the School of Education.

Gruwell intended to study law but after watching the news coverage of the 1992 Los Angeles riots she decided to become a teacher because she realized education could make more of a difference. She has said that she chose teaching because she believed the more useful intervention came in the classroom rather than the courtroom.

== Career ==
Gruwell began student teaching in 1994 at Woodrow Wilson High School in Long Beach, California. She was assigned low-performing students in the school. One student, a boy named Sharaud, had recently transferred to Wilson from a rival high school where he had allegedly threatened his teacher with a gun. However, a few months into the school year, one of her other students passed a note depicting Sharaud (an African American) with large lips. Gruwell told her students that it was drawings like that which led to the Holocaust. When one of her students asked her what the Holocaust was, she was met by uncomprehending looks—none of her students had heard of one of the defining moments of the 20th century. Gruwell took the students to see Schindler's List, bought new books out of her own pocket and invited guest speakers.

After her year of student teaching, Gruwell returned to Wilson as a full teacher, this time with a class of sophomores. Her fall semester got off to a rocky start due to student protests of Proposition 187—but Gruwell persevered and reached her students by asking them to keep journals and make movies of their lives, and by relating the family feud in Romeo and Juliet to a gang war. She also had the students read books written by and about other teenagers in times of war, such as The Diary of a Young Girl, Zlata's Diary and Night. Writing journals became a solace for many of the students, and because the journals were shared anonymously, teenagers who once refused to speak to someone of a different race became like a family.

In the fall of 1995, Gruwell gave each of her students a bag full of new books and had them make a toast for change. After that, she saw a turnaround in them. All 150 Freedom Writers graduated from high school and many went on to attend college.

Between 1994 and 1998, the Freedom Writers garnered a great deal of media coverage, including appearances on Primetime Live, The View and Good Morning America.

=== After teaching ===
In 1998, after teaching for only four years, Gruwell left Wilson High School and became a Distinguished Teacher in Residence at California State University, Long Beach. Gruwell later went on to start the Freedom Writers Foundation, which aspires to spread the Freedom Writers method across the country.

The Freedom Writers Diary is a 1999 book written by the Freedom Writers with intros by Erin Gruwell. It is the basis of the 2007 movie Freedom Writers, starring Hilary Swank as Gruwell, and Gruwell is the subject of the 2019 PBS documentary Freedom Writers: Stories from the Heart.

She has written an autobiographical account of her experiences, entitled Teach with Your Heart: Lessons I Learned from the Freedom Writers, published around the same time as the movie's release.

She has also worked regularly with the Anti-Defamation League, the USC Shoah Foundation, the Simon Wiesenthal Center, and even the U.S. State Department, to promote religious tolerance.

== See also ==
- Inspirational teachers portrayed in films
