= Mount Kenya =

Highest mountain in Kenya

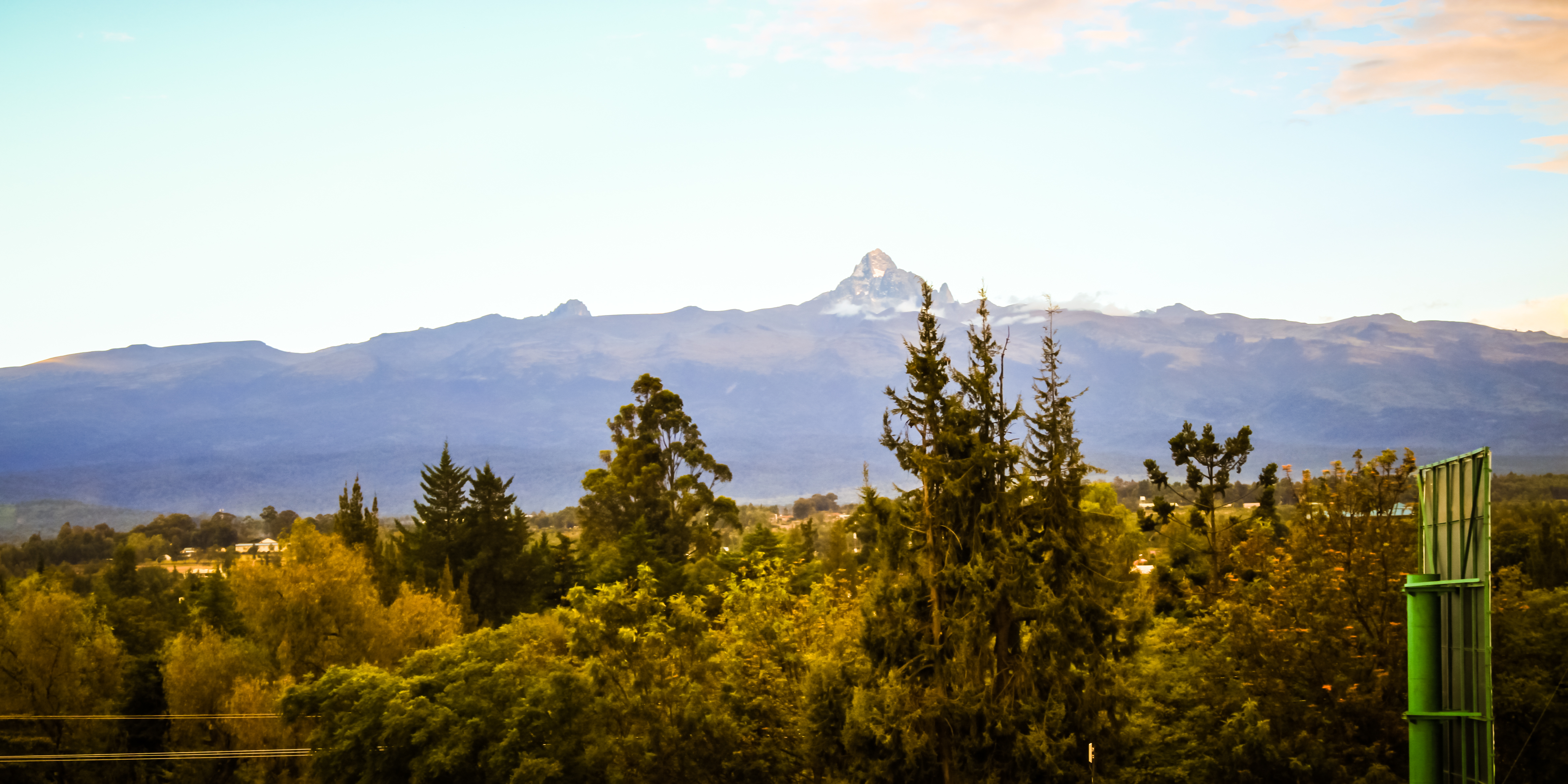
- Mount Kenya as seen from town of Nanyuki.

Highest point
- Elevation: 5,199 m (17,057 ft)
- Prominence: 3,825 m (12,549 ft); Ranked 32nd
- Listing: Seven Second Summits; Country high point Ultra
- Coordinates: 0°9′03″S 37°18′27″E

Geography
- Location within Kenya Location within Africa Location within Earth
- Location: Kenya
- Parent range: The Eastern Rift mountains
- Topo map(s): Mount Kenya by Wielochowski and Savage

Geology
- Formed by: Volcanism along the Gregory Rift
- Mountain type: Stratovolcano (extinct)
- Last eruption: 2.6–3.1 MYA

Climbing
- First ascent: 13 September 1899 by Mackinder, Ollier, and Brocherel.
- Easiest route: Rock climb

Mount Kenya (Meru: Kĩrĩmaara, Kikuyu: Kĩrĩmanyaga, or "Kīrī-nyaga", Kamba: Ki nyaa, Embu: Kĩ nyaga, or "Kirinyaga") is the second highest mountain in Africa and the namesake of the country Kenya. Located about 150 km (90 mi) north-northeast of the capital of Nairobi and just 16.5 kilometres (10.3 miles) south of the equator, the mountain's highest peaks are Batian (5,199 m), Nelion (5,188 m), and Point Lenana (4,985 m). Historically situated in the former Eastern and Central provinces, the massif now serves as the intersection of Meru, Embu, Kirinyaga, Nyeri, and Tharaka Nithi counties. The area was officially gazetted as the Mount Kenya National Park in 1949 and was later designated a UNESCO World Heritage Site in 1997 for its outstanding natural beauty and ecological significance. Today, the park and its surrounding forest reserve are managed by the Kenya Wildlife Service and the Kenya Forest Service as a critical sanctuary for endangered species and a primary water tower for the region.

Mount Kenya is a volcano created approximately 3 million years after the opening of the East African Rift. Before glaciation, it was 7,000 m (23,000 ft) high. It was covered by an ice cap for thousands of years. This has resulted in very eroded slopes and numerous valleys radiating from the peak. There are currently 11 small glaciers, which are shrinking rapidly, and may disappear by 2050. The forested slopes are an important source of water for much of Kenya. There are several vegetation bands from the base to the peak. The lower slopes are covered by different types of forest. Many alpine species are endemic to Mount Kenya, such as the giant lobelias and senecios and a local subspecies of rock hyrax. The park receives over 16,000 visitors per year.

== Local culture ==
The main ethnic groups living around Mount Kenya are Kikuyu, Ameru, Embu and Maasai. The mountain is as an important aspect of their cultures. They arrived in the Mount Kenya area and have been living there for centuries.

=== Kikuyu ===
The Kikuyu people live on the southern and western sides of the mountain. They are agriculturalists, and make use of the highly fertile volcanic soil on the lower slopes. They believe that God, Ngai or Mwene Nyaga, lived on Mount Kenya when he came down from the sky. They believe that the mountain is Ngai's throne on earth. It is the place where Gĩkũyũ, the father of the tribe, used to meet with God. Thus according to the Kikuyu records, Gĩkũyũ is the first person on Earth to ascend the mountain. 'Mwene Nyaga' in the Kikuyu language can also translate as the "Owner of the Ostriches" or "Owner of the white patches (of snow)" where 'Mwene' translates to 'owner', and 'Nyaga' to Ostriches or white patches. The snow (in Kikuyu: Ira) caps of the mountain symbolically represent a crown on God's habitation. Kikuyu used to build their houses with doors facing the mountain. The Kikuyu name for Mount Kenya is Kirima Kĩrĩ Nyaga (Mt. Kirinyaga), which literally translates to the mountain that has the "Nyaga" – Ostriches. The mountain, therefore, is locally accepted as 'God's Resting Place' or 'Where God Lives'. The Kikuyu name for Mt. Kenya is Kĩrĩnyaga which literally means 'the one with the ostrich'. The ostrich has dark feathers and a white tail– when the bird bends its head to the ground with its tail in the air, its body forms a triangular shape with a white peak, closely resembling the snow-capped mountain of Kĩrĩnyaga. The name Kĩrĩnyaga therefore figuratively means 'the one with white tails', referring to the glaciers among the peaks of the mountain.

Translated to the Kamba language, kĩrĩnyaga, would be ki nyaa. This is the name that Johann Ludwig Krapf was given when he sighted the mountain from Kitui (in Kamba county). He recorded it as Kenya. It became the name of not only the mountain but also the country.

=== Embu ===
The Embu people live to the south-east of Mount Kenya, and believe that the mountain is God's home (the Embu word for God is Ngai, Murungu or Mwene Njeru).The Embu name for Mount Kenya is Kĩ nyaga, which, similar to the Kikuyu, means 'the one with the ostrich'. The mountain is sacred, and they build their houses with the doors facing toward it. The Embu people are closely related to the Ameru and Kikuyu people. The Mbeere and Akamba are the settlers of the southeast side of the mountain.

=== Ameru ===
The Ameru occupy the east, north, and north-western slopes of the mountain. They are generally agricultural and also keep livestock and occupy what is among the most fertile land in Kenya. The Meru god Murungu was from the skies. Their name for Mt. Kenya is Kirimaara, which means 'mountain with white features'.

=== Maasai ===
The Maasai are semi-nomadic people, who use the land to the north of the mountain to graze their cattle. They believe that their ancestors came down from the mountain at the beginning of time. The Maasai name for Mount Kenya is Ol Donyo Keri, which means 'mountain of stripes', referring to the dark shades as observed from the surrounding plains. At least one Maasai prayer refers to Mount Kenya:

God bless our children, let them be like the olive tree of Morintat, let them grow and expand, let them be like Ngong Hills like Mt. Kenya, like Mt. Kilimanjaro and multiply in number.

— Collected by Francis Sakuda of Oloshoibor Peace Museum

== Mount Kenya National Park ==
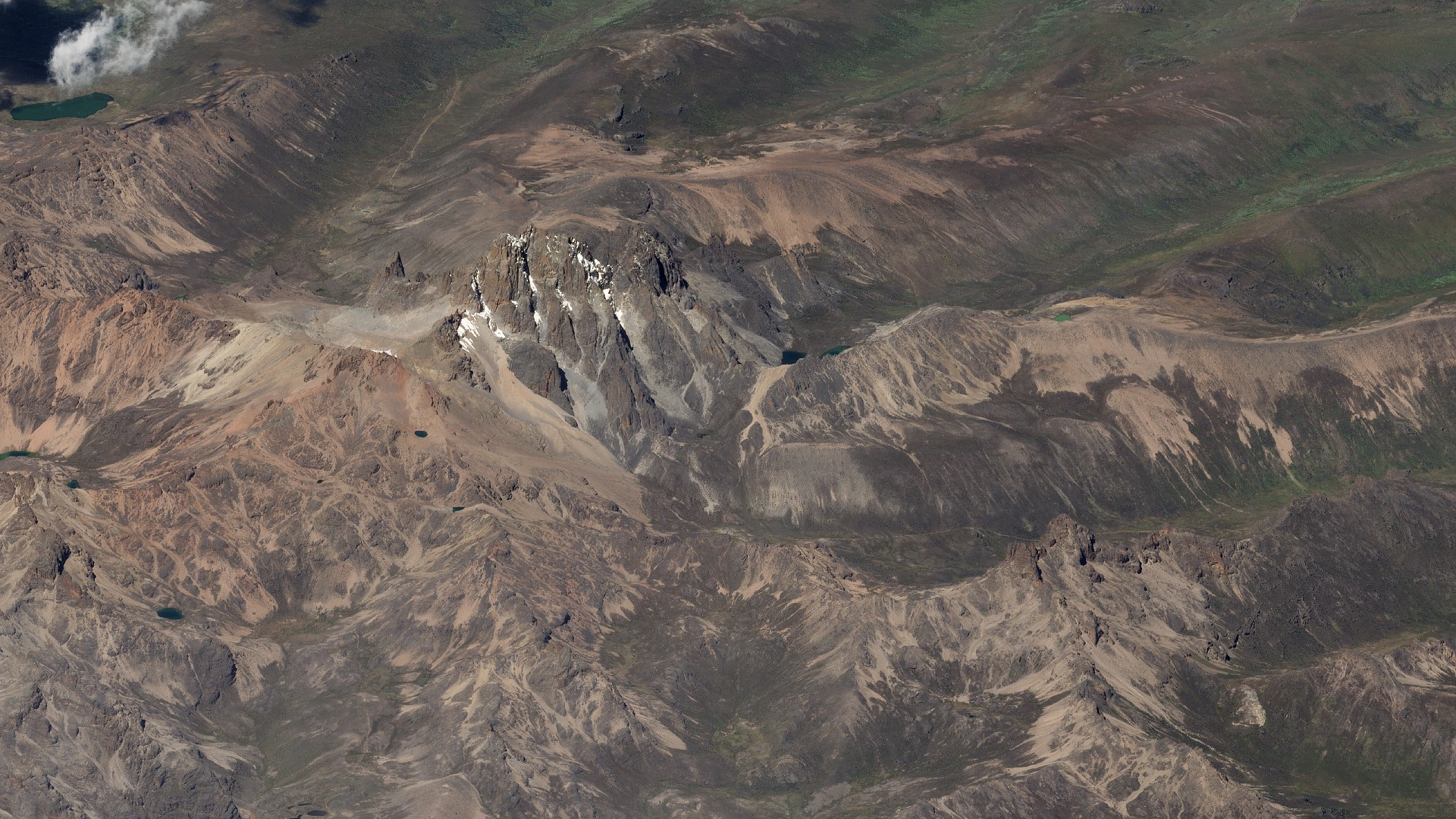
Mount Kenya, as seen from a SkySat satellite

Mount Kenya National Park, established in 1949, protects the region surrounding the mountain. Currently, the national park is within the forest reserve which encircles it. In April 1978 the area was designated a UNESCO Biosphere Reserve. The national park and the forest reserve, combined, became a UNESCO World Heritage Site in 1997.

The Government of Kenya had four reasons for creating a national park on and around Mount Kenya. These were the importance of tourism for the local and national economies, preserving an area of great scenic beauty, conserving the biodiversity within the park, and preserving the water catchment for the surrounding area.

Kenya's government has announced a project to discourage animals from straying into small holdings surrounding the national park and devastating crops, which will see the national park enclosed by an electric fence with five electrified strands. Kenya's Rhino Ark Trust, a non-profit organization, has been putting up fences in key areas around the country. As of 2021, 250 kilometres (160 miles) out of a planned 450 kilometres (280 miles) have been constructed in the Mt. Kenya area. The fence discharges an electric shock, but is not dangerous to humans or animals.

== Geology ==
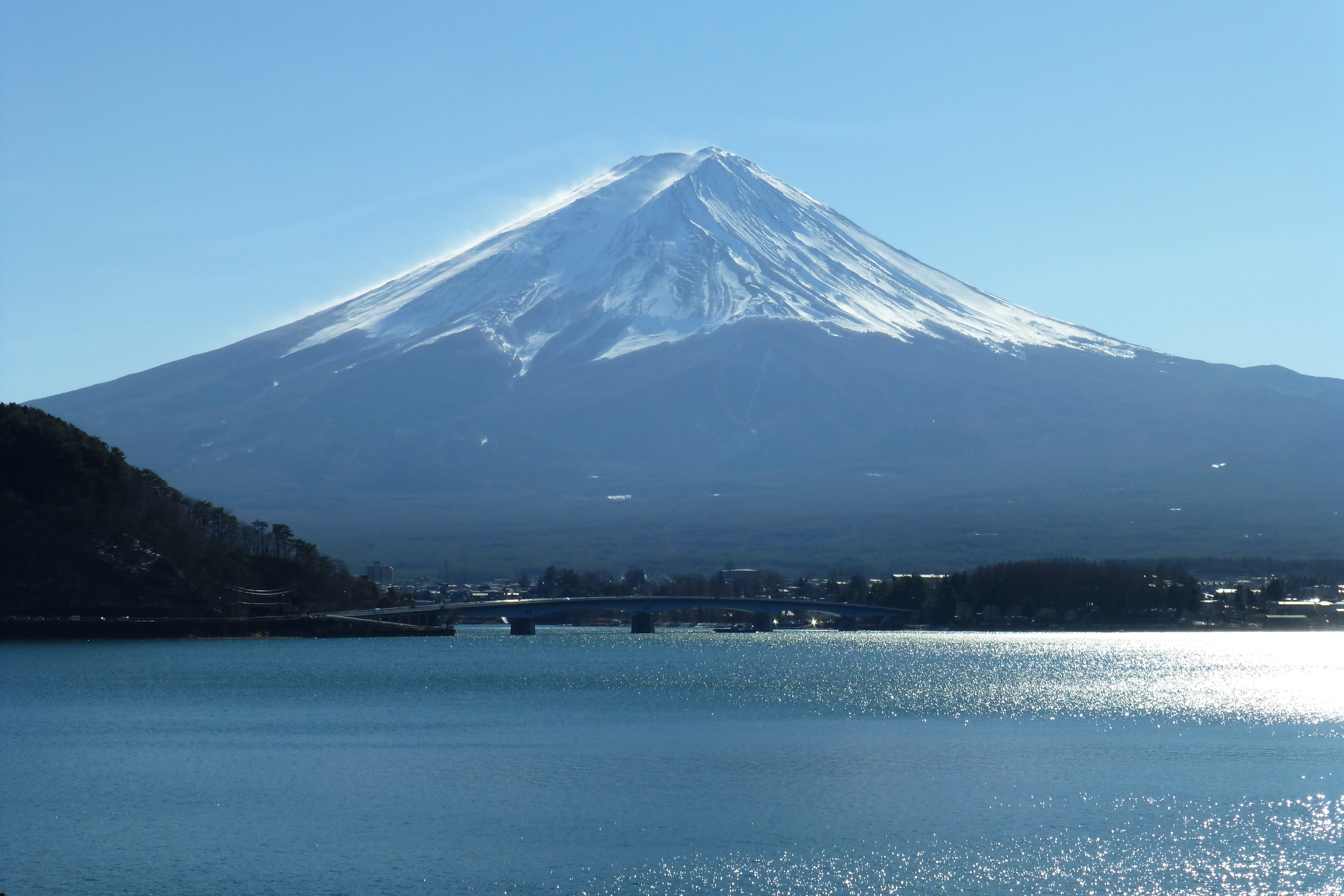
Mount Kenya was a stratovolcano and probably looked similar to Mt. Fuji (shown above). The lower slopes are still this shape, which is how the previous height is estimated.

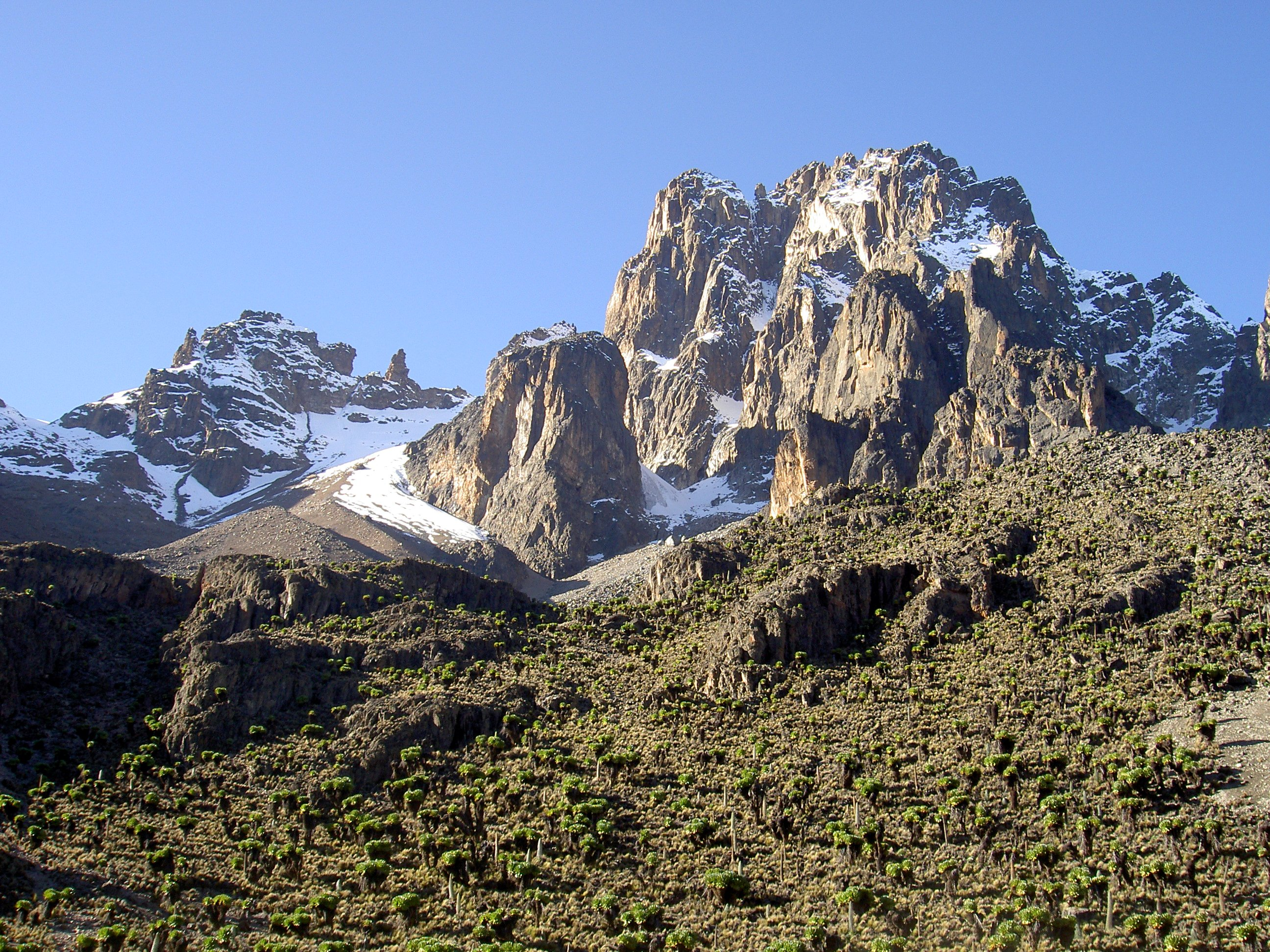
The central peaks of Mount Kenya are volcanic plugs that have resisted glacial erosion. (Left to right: Point Thompson (4955m), Batian (5199m) and Nelion (5188m))

Mount Kenya is a stratovolcano that was active in the Plio-Pleistocene. The original crater was probably over 6,000 m (19,700 ft) high; and potentially up to 7,000 m (23,000 ft) high, making the prehistoric Mount Kenya higher than present-day Kilimanjaro. Since it became extinct there have been two major periods of glaciation, which are shown by two main rings of moraines below the glaciers. The lowest moraine is found at around 3,300 m (10,800 ft). Today the glaciers reach no lower than 4,650 m (15,260 ft). After studying the moraines, John Walter Gregory put forward the theory that at one time the whole summit of the mountain was covered with an ice cap, and it was this that eroded the peaks to how they are today.

The mountain's lower slopes, which have never been glaciated, are currently dominated by a mix of cultivation and forest, and are characterized by deep, fluvial V-shaped valleys with numerous branching tributaries. In contrast, the higher elevations of the moorland zone feature shallower, flat-bottomed U-shaped valleys carved by ancient glacial activity. This stark topographical shift marks the transition from landscapes shaped by millions of years of river erosion to those sculpted by the movement of prehistoric ice sheets.

When Mount Kenya was active there was some satellite activity. The northeastern side of the mountain has many old volcanic plugs and craters. The largest of these, Ithanguni, even had its own ice cap when the main peaks were covered in ice. This can be seen by the smoothed summit of the peak. Circular hills with steep sides are also frequent in this area, which are probably the remains of small plugged vents. However, as the remaining mountain is roughly symmetrical, most of the activity must have occurred at the central plug.

The rocks that form Mount Kenya are mainly basalts, rhomb porphyrites, phonolites, kenytes and trachytes. Kenyte was first reported by Gregory in 1900 following his study of the geology of Mount Kenya.

The geology of the Mount Kenya area was first described scientifically by Joseph Thomson in 1883. He saw the mountain from the nearby Laikipia Plateau and wrote that it was an extinct volcano with the plug exposed. However, as he had only seen the mountain from a distance his description was not widely believed in Europe, particularly after 1887 when Sámuel Teleki and Ludwig von Höhnel ascended the mountain and described what they considered to be the crater. In 1893 Gregory's expedition reached the Lewis Glacier at 5,000 m (16,400 ft). He confirmed that the volcano was extinct and that there were glaciers present. The first thorough survey by Europeans was not undertaken until 1966.

== Peaks ==
The main peaks and glaciers of Mount Kenya are near the centre of the mountain.

The peaks of Mount Kenya are almost all of volcanic origin. The majority of the peaks are located near the centre of the mountain which have an Alpine appearance due to their craggy nature. Typically of Alpine terrain, the highest peaks and gendarmes occur at the intersection of ridges. The central peaks only have a few mosses, lichens, and small alpine plants growing in rock crevices. Further away from the central peaks, the volcanic plugs are covered in volcanic ash and soils. The vegetation growing on these peaks is typical for their vegetation band.

The highest peaks are Batian (5,199 m or 17,057 ft), Nelion (5,188 m or 17,021 ft) and Pt Lenana (4,985 m or 16,355 ft). Batian and Nelion are within 250 m (270 yd) of each other, separated by the Gate of the Mists gap of 5,144 m (16,877 ft).

Other peaks around the central plug include Pt Piggot (4,957 m or 16,263 ft), Pt Dutton (4,885 m or 16,027 ft), Pt John (4,883 m or 16,020 ft), Pt John Minor (4,875 m or 15,994 ft), Krapf Rognon (4,800 m or 15,748 ft), Pt Peter (4,757 m or 15,607 ft), Pt Slade (4,750 m or 15,584 ft) and Midget Peak (4,700 m or 15,420 ft). All of these have a steep pyramidal form.

Significant craggy outlying peaks include Terere (4,714 m or 15,466 ft) and Sendeyo (4,704 m or 15,433 ft) which form a pair of twin peaks to the north of the main plug. Together, they form a large parasitic plug. Other notable peaks include The Hat (4,639 m or 15,220 ft), Delamere Peak, Macmillan Peak and Rotundu.

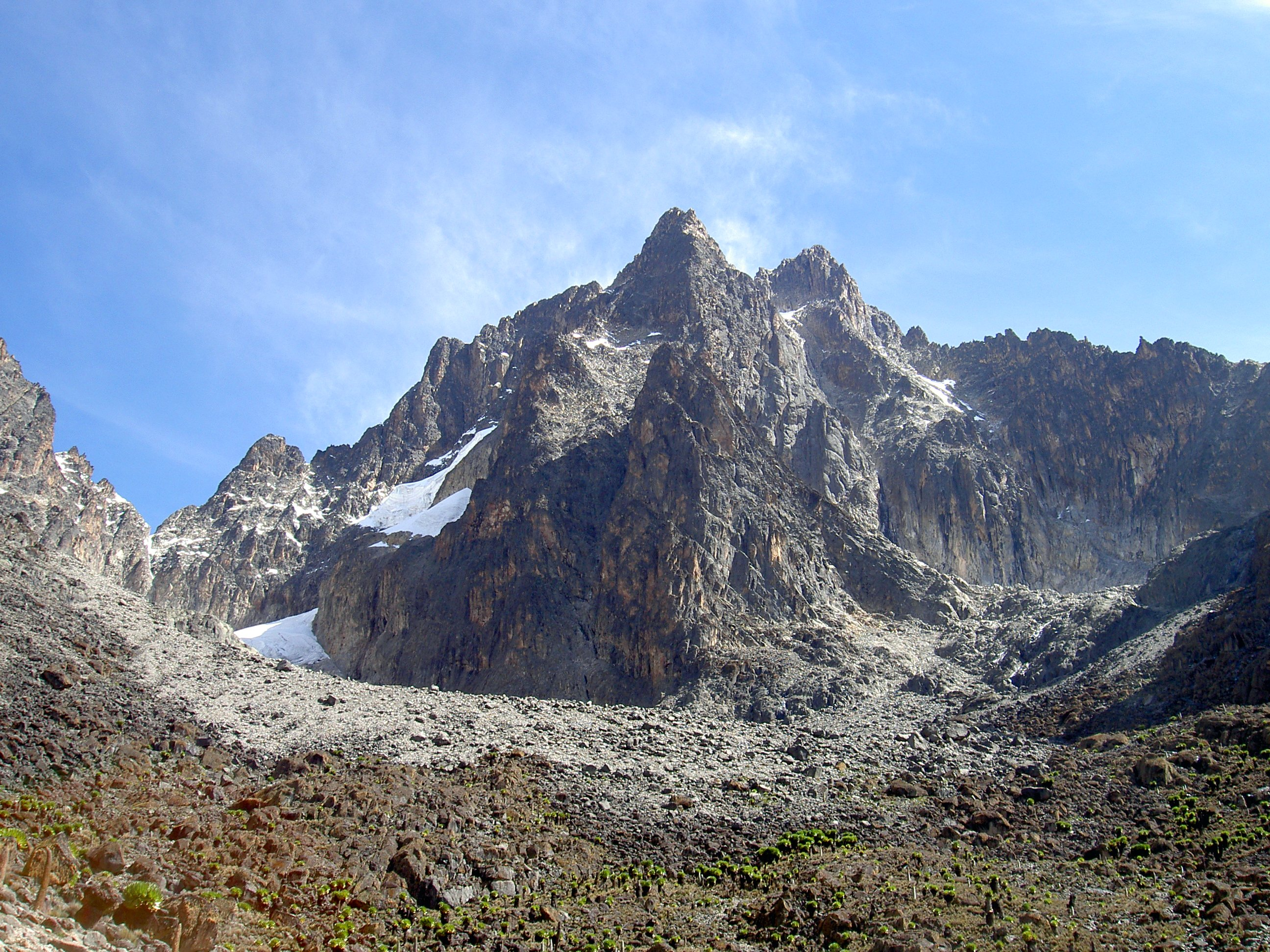
Batian on the left, Nelion on the right, and Slade in the foreground

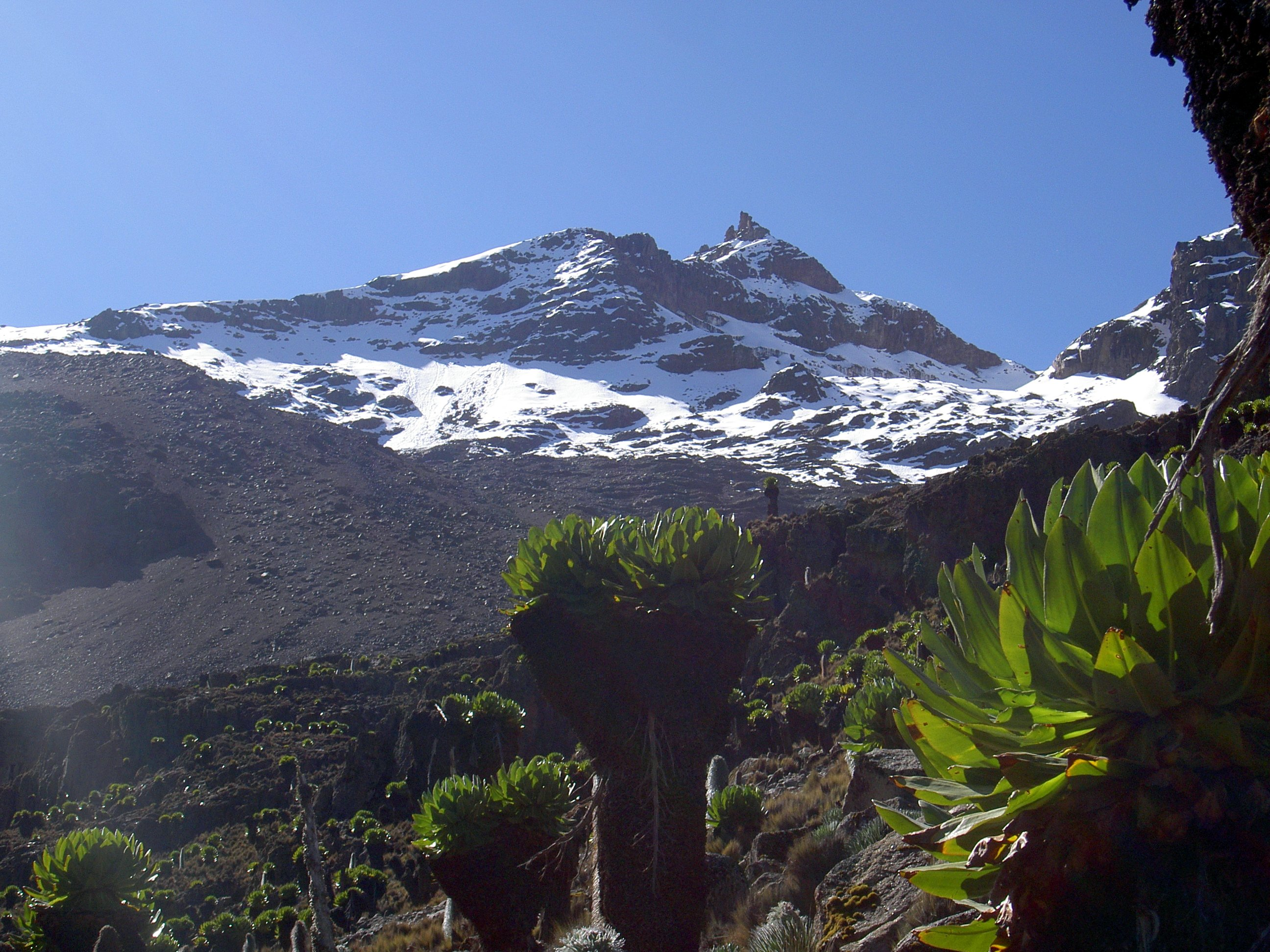
Lenana, the third highest peak, is the most ascended

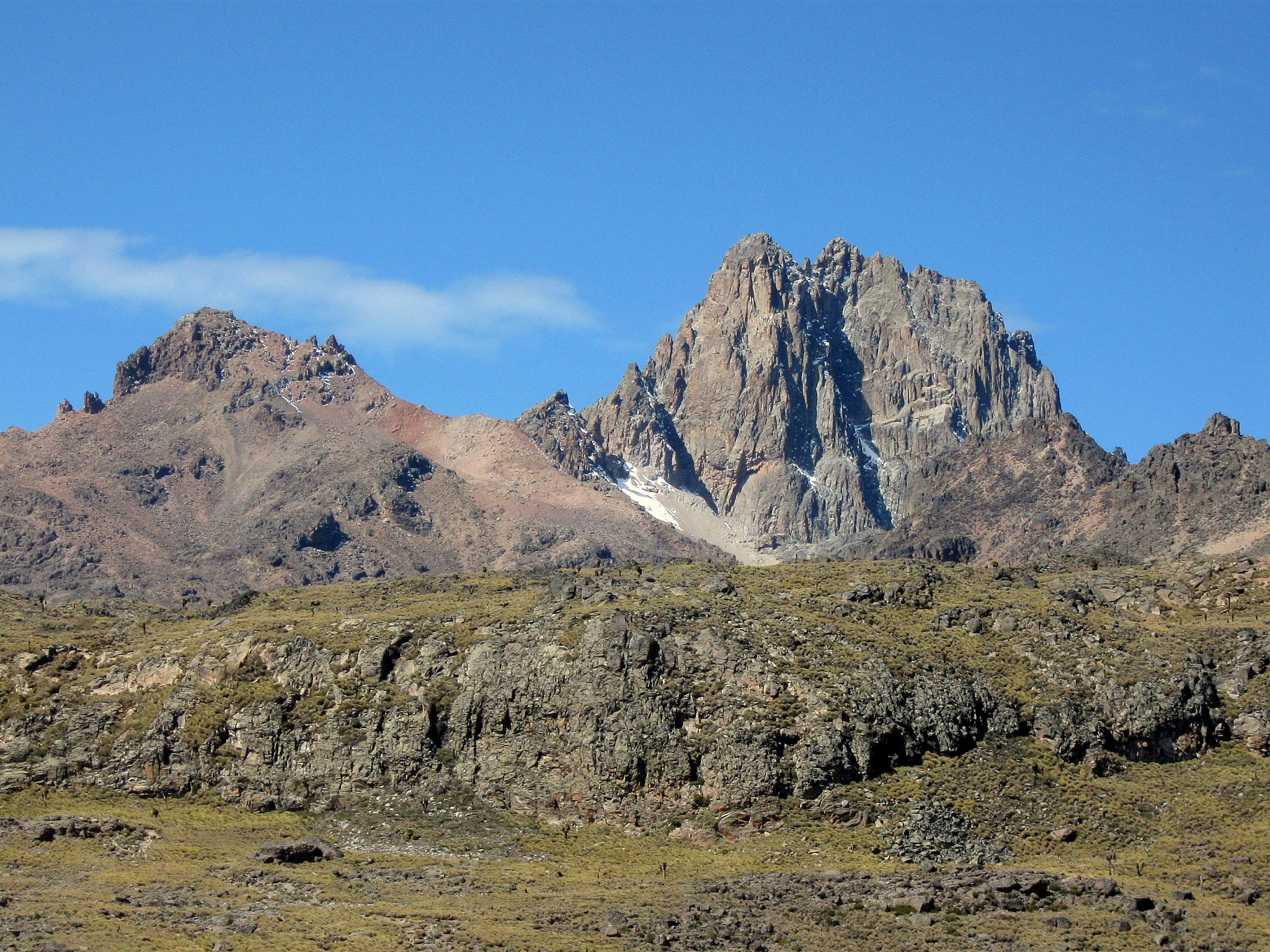
Mount Kenya, left to right: Point Lenana (4985m), Nelion summit (5188), Batian summit (5199m)

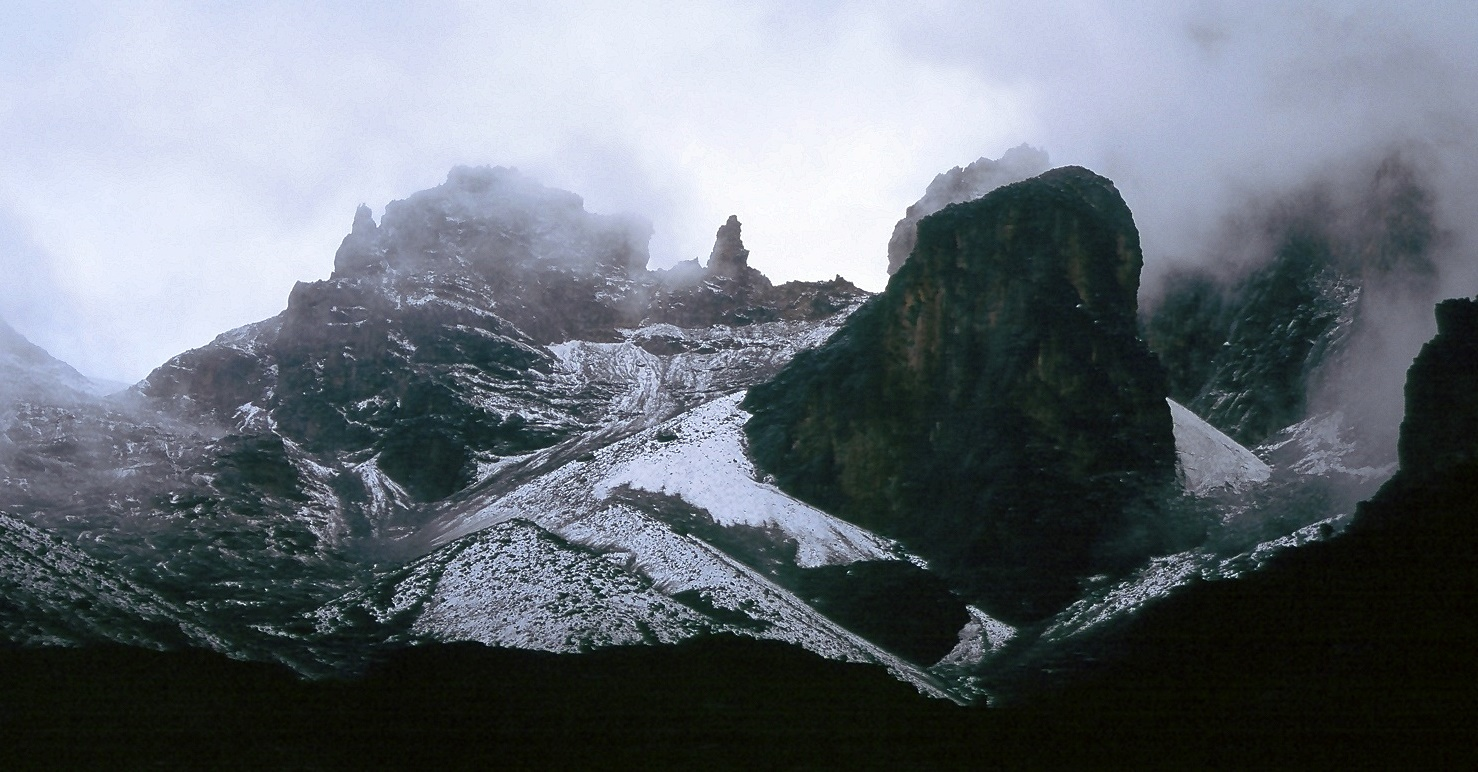
Krapf Rognon (4,800 m or 15,748 ft) and Krapf glacier

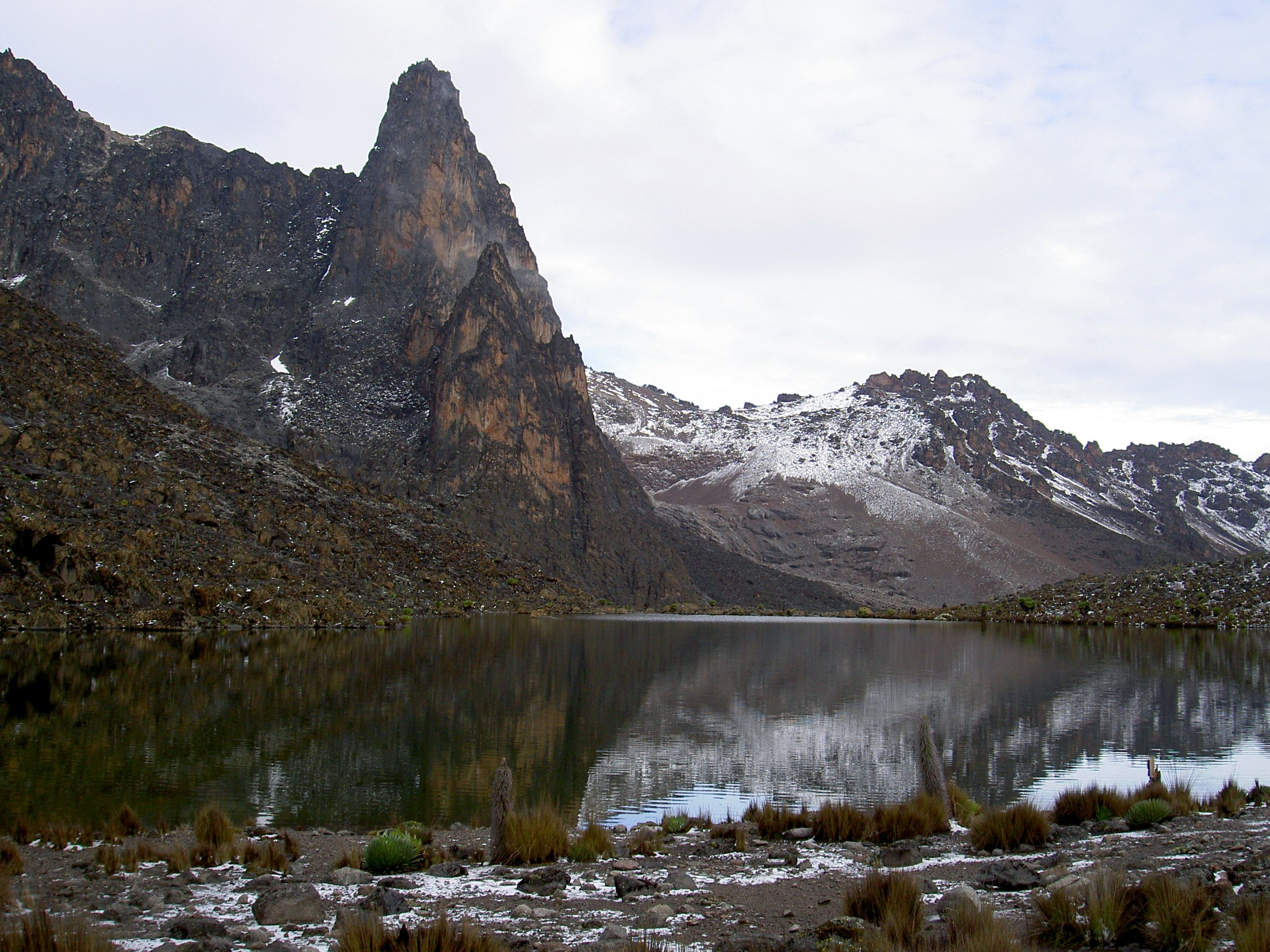
Midget peak can be climbed in a day.

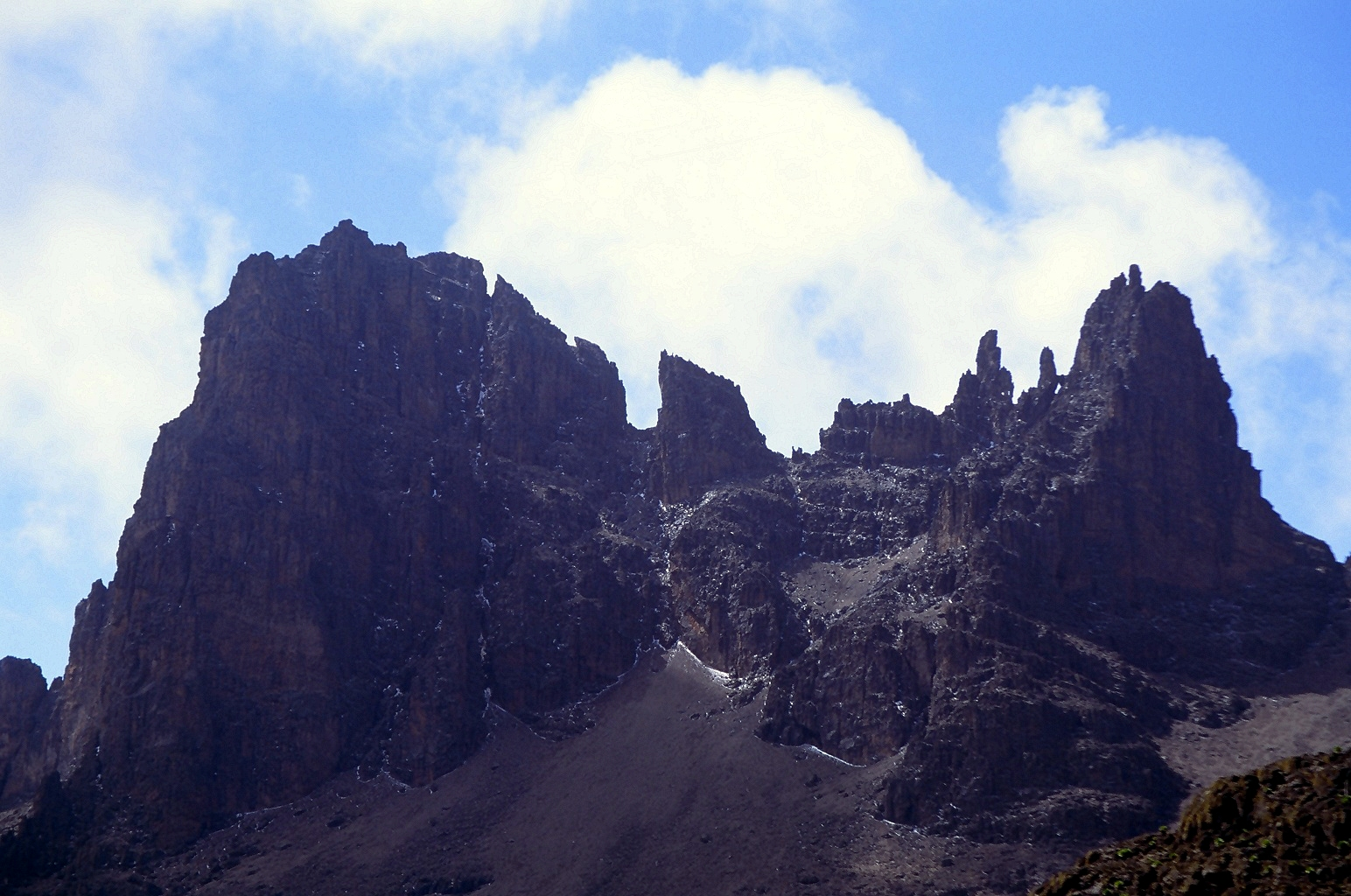
Terere and Sendeyo are two craggy outlying peaks

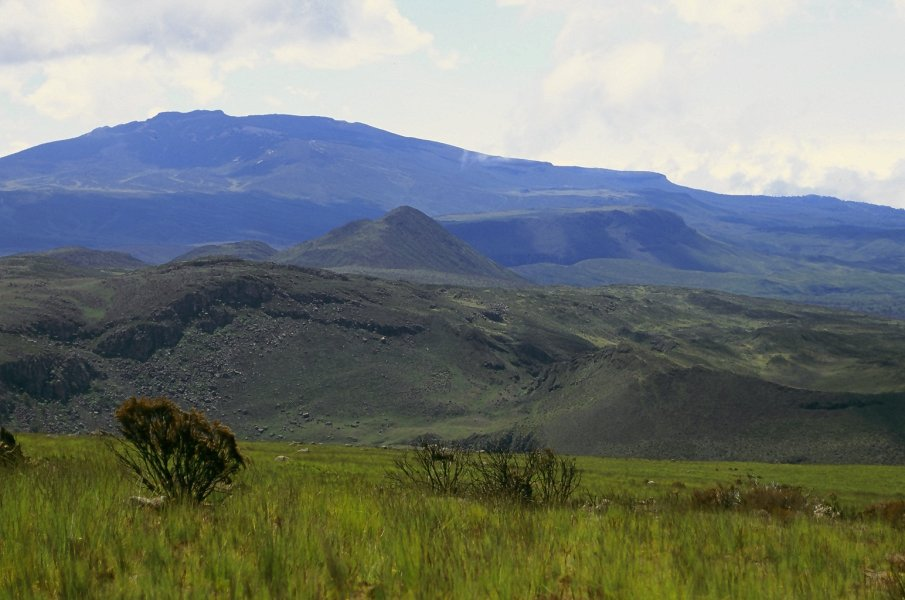
Mugi hill and the Giant's Billiards Table offers some of the best hillwalking in Kenya.

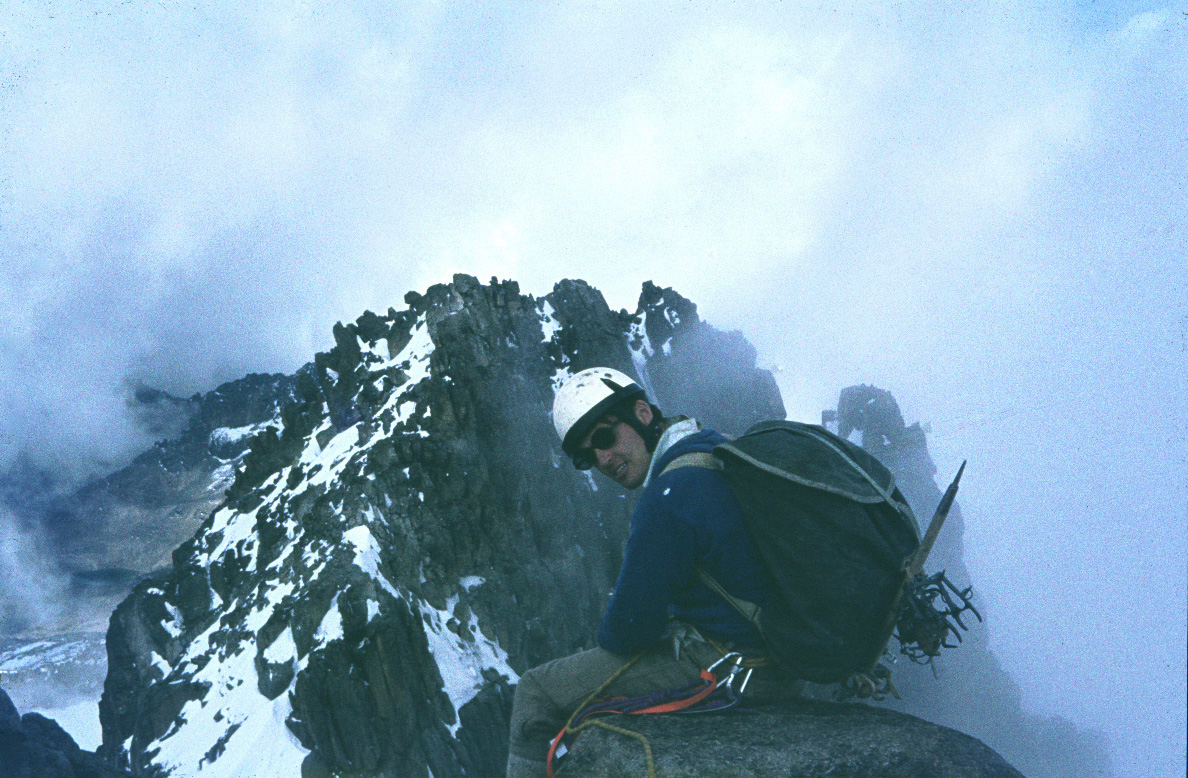
Nelion from Batian in Dec 1974

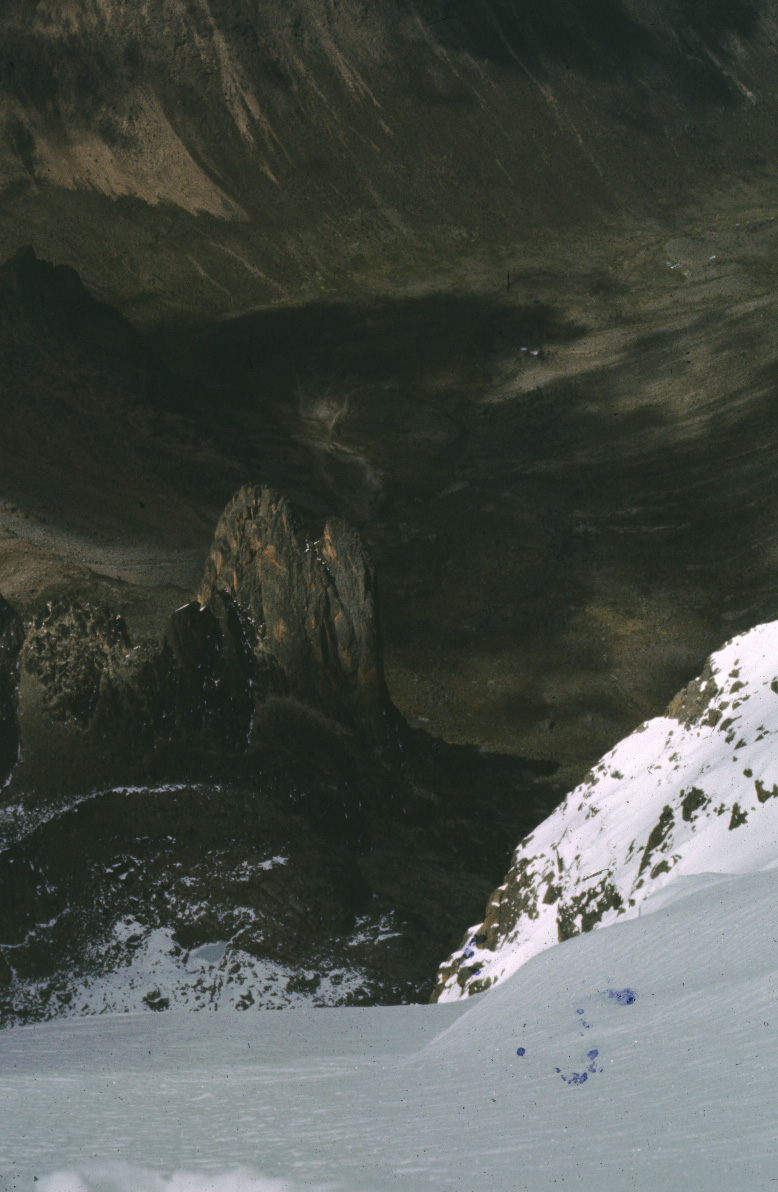
Looking down the Diamond Glacier to Pt John

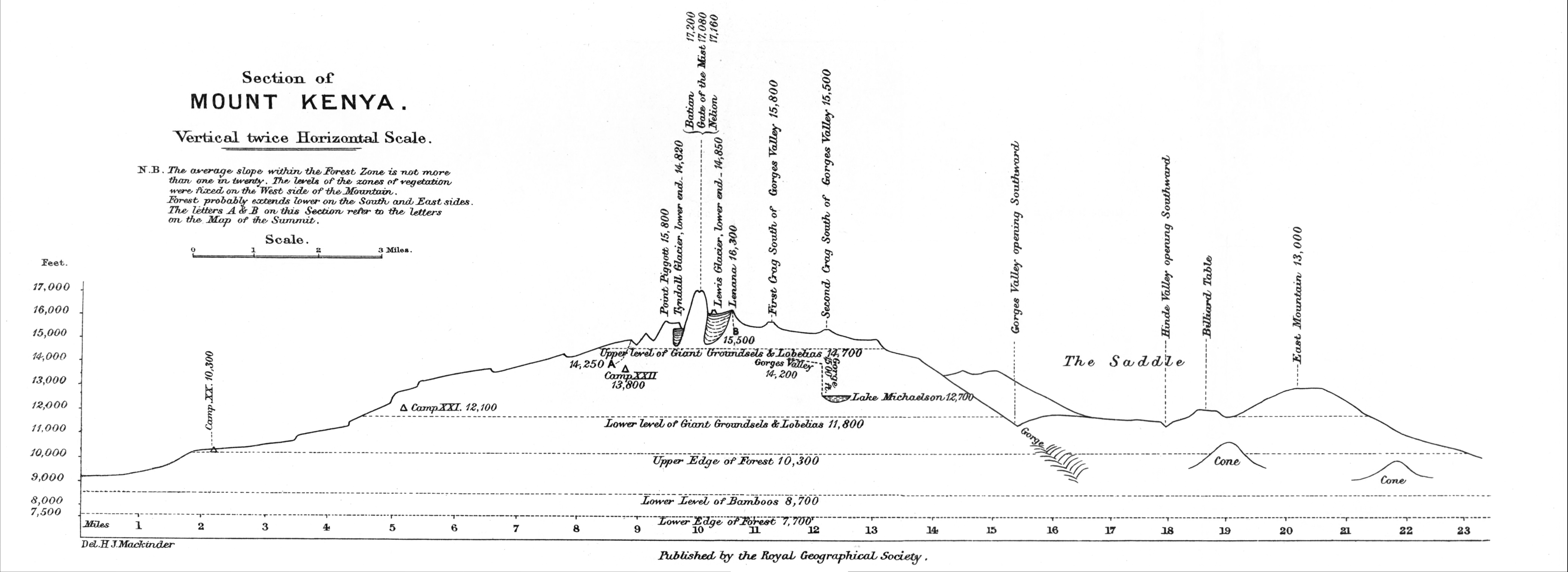
Vegetation zones

== Glaciers ==
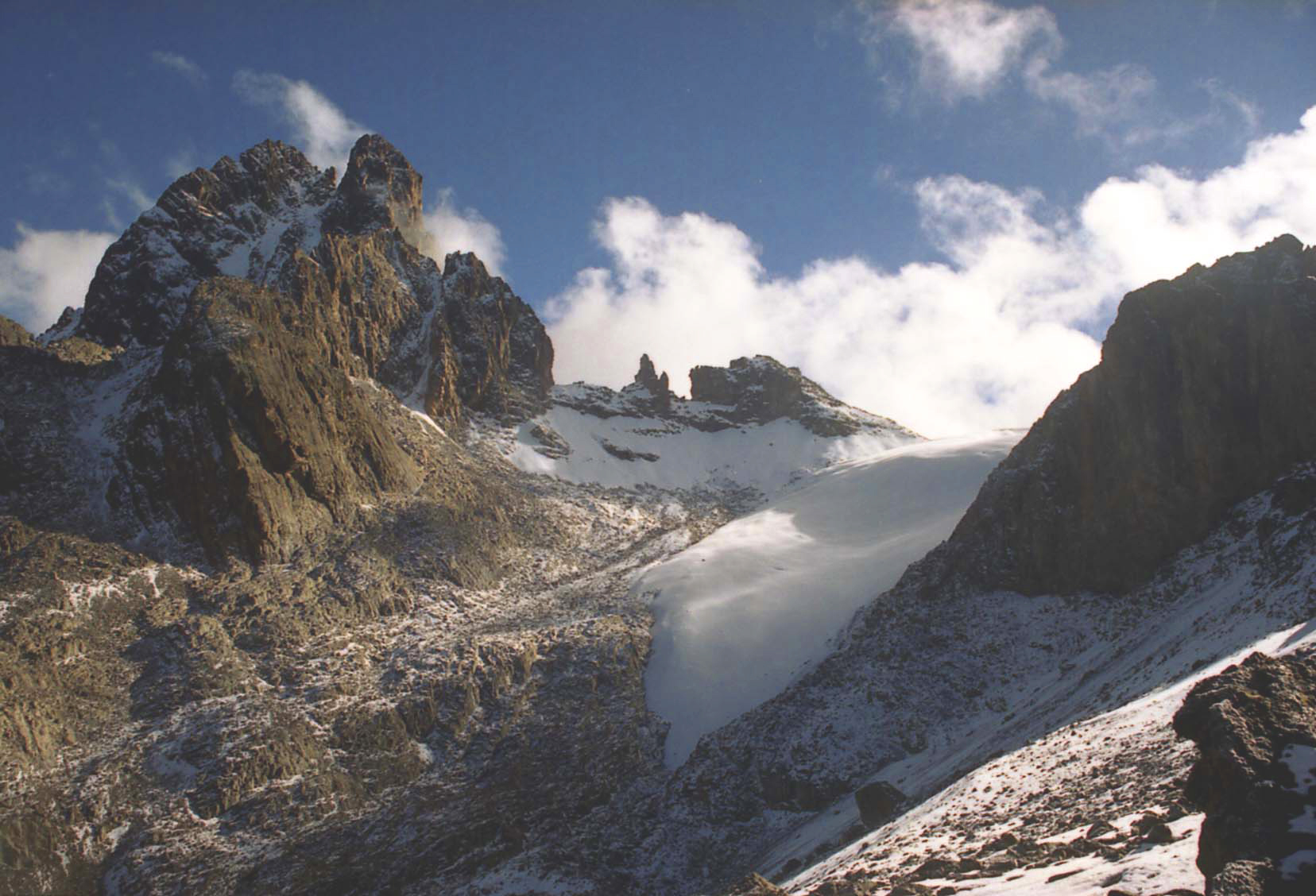
The Lewis Glacier is the largest on Mount Kenya

The glaciers on Mount Kenya are retreating rapidly. The Mountain Club of Kenya in Nairobi has photographs showing the mountain at the time of the first recorded ascent in 1899, and again more recently; the retreat of the glaciers is very evident. Descriptions of ascents of several of the peaks advise the use of crampons, but this is true only in some cases and at higher elevations. Every year there is less new snow accumulating in winter than melting in summer, even on the Lewis Glacier (the largest of them) in winter, so there is no formation of new ice. It is predicted to be less than 30 years before there will no longer be ice on Mount Kenya. Glacial retreat and disappearance can be caused by changes in temperature trends, or by a change in precipitation trends.

The glacier names are (clockwise from the north):

- Northey, Krapf, Gregory, Lewis, Diamond, Darwin, Forel, Heim, Tyndall, Cesar, Josef.

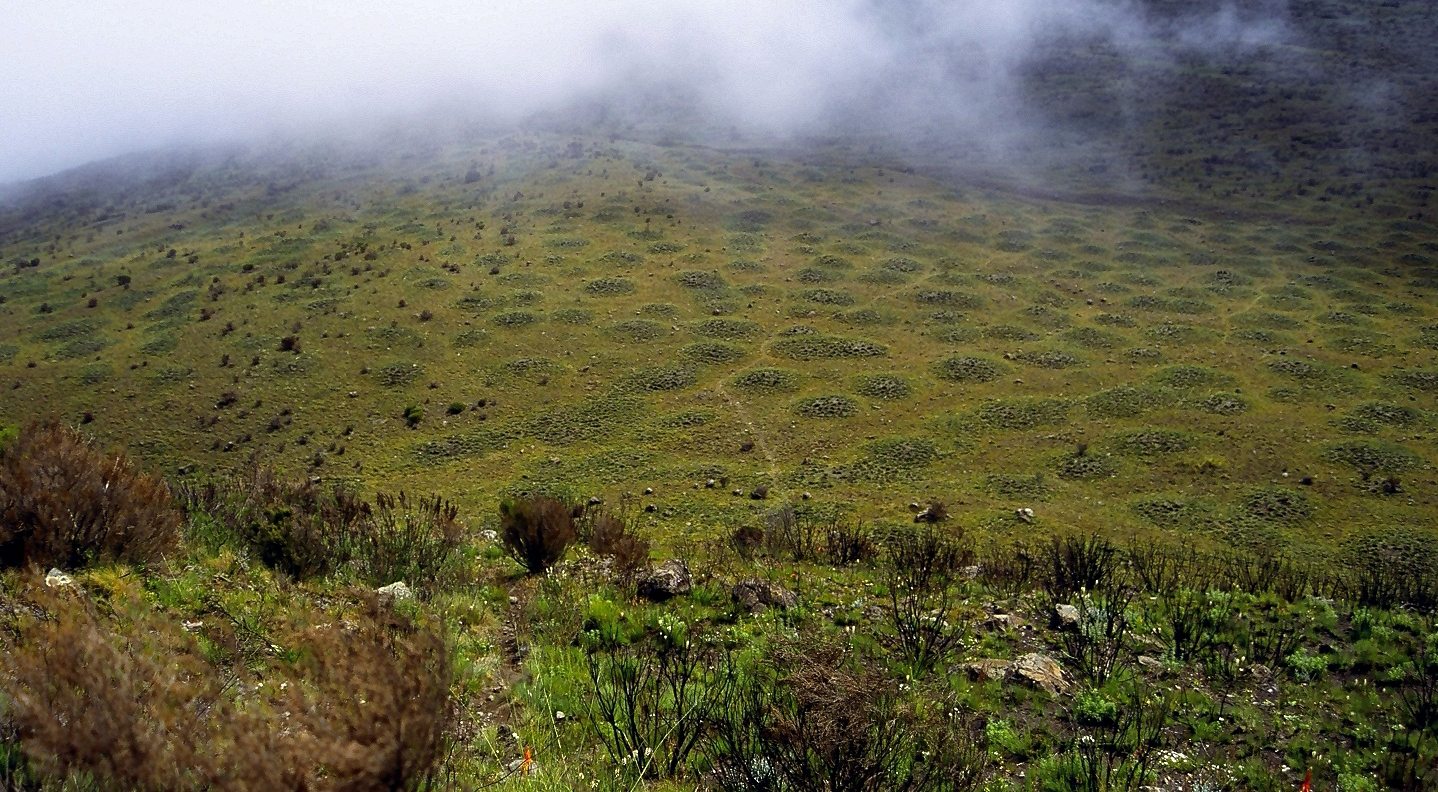
Frost heaving causes patterned solifluction lobes below Mugi Hill.

The total area covered by glaciers on the mountain was recorded as about 0.7 km^{2} (1/4 sq mi) in the 1980s, far less than that recorded by the first observations, made in the 1890s. A 2024 study showed that only 10% of the surface-area of the 1980s remained; 6,9 ha, about half as much as in 2016.

=== Periglacial landforms ===
Although Mount Kenya is on the equator the freezing nightly temperatures result in periglacial landforms. There is permafrost a few centimetres (inches) below the surface. Patterned ground is present at 3,400 m (11,155 ft) to the west of Mugi Hill. These mounds grow because the repeated freezing and thawing of the ground draws in more water. There are blockfields present around 4,000 m (13,123 ft) where the ground has cracked to form hexagons. Solifluction occurs when the night temperatures freeze the soil before it thaws again in the morning. This daily expansion and contraction of the soil prevent the establishment of vegetation.

== Rivers ==
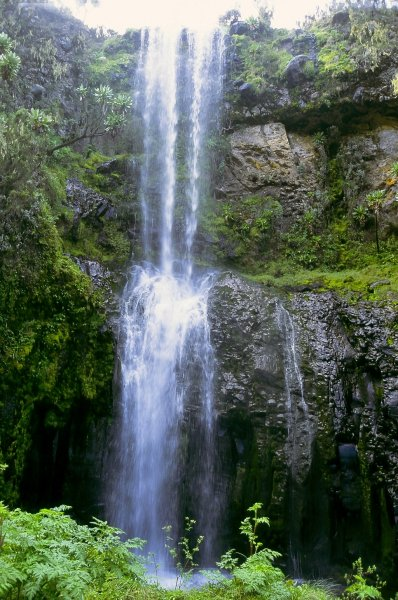
Runoff from Mount Kenya provides water for over 2 million people.

Mount Kenya is the main water catchment area for two large rivers in Kenya; the Tana, the largest river in Kenya, and the Ewaso Nyiro North. The Mount Kenya ecosystem provides water directly for over 2 million people. The rivers on Mount Kenya have been named after the villages on the slopes of the mountain that they flow close to. The Thuchi River is the district boundary between Tharaka Nithi and Embu. Mount Kenya is a major water tower for the Tana river which in 1988 supplied 80% of Kenya's electricity using a series of seven hydroelectric power stations and dams.

The density of streams is very high, especially on the lower slopes which have never been glaciated. The ice cap which used to cover the mountain during the Pliocene eroded large U-shaped valleys which tend to only have one large stream. Where the original shape of the shield volcano is still preserved, there have been millions of years for streams to erode the hillside. This area is therefore characterised by frequent deep fluvial V-shaped valleys. The gradual transition from glaciated to the fluvial valley can be clearly observed.

Rivers that start on Mount Kenya are the tributaries of two large Kenyan rivers: the Tana and the Ewaso Ng'iro rivers. A lot of Mount Kenyan rivers flow into the Sagana which itself is a tributary of the Tana, which joins at the Masinga Reservoir. The rivers in the northern part of the mountain, such as the Burguret, Naru Moru, Nanyuki, Likii, and Sirimon flow into the Ewaso Nyiro. The rivers to the southwest, such as the Keringa and Nairobi flow into the Sagana and then into the Tana. The remaining rivers to the south and east, such as the Kathitâ (Largest River in Meru), Mutonga, Nithi, Thuchi, and Nyamindi, flow directly into the Tana.

== Natural history ==
Mount Kenya has several altitudinal ecological zones, from the savanna surrounding the mountain to the nival zone by the glaciers. Each zone has a dominant species of vegetation. Many of the species found higher up the mountain are endemic, either to Mount Kenya or East Africa.

There are also differences within the zones, depending on the side of the mountain and the aspect of the slope. The southeast is much wetter than the north, so species more dependent on moisture can grow. Some species, such as African alpine bamboo, are limited to certain aspects of the mountain because of the amount of moisture.

=== Zones ===
There are distinct vegetation zones around Mount Kenya which vary according to altitude and aspect.

The climate of Mount Kenya changes considerably with altitude, forming belts of community types. Around the base of the mountain is fertile farmland. The people living around the mountain have cultivated this cool, relatively moist area for centuries.

Mount Kenya is surrounded by forests. The vegetation in the forests depend on rainfall, and the species present differ greatly between the northern and southern slopes. As time has passed the trees on the edge of the forest have been logged and the farmland has encroached further up the fertile slopes of the mountain.

Above the forest is a belt of African alpine bamboo. This zone is almost continuous but is restricted to small isolated bunches in the north because of low rainfall. The bamboo is natural, and does not require forest disturbance. Tracks are common through the bamboo. Bamboo suppresses other vegetation, so it is uncommon to find trees or other plants here.

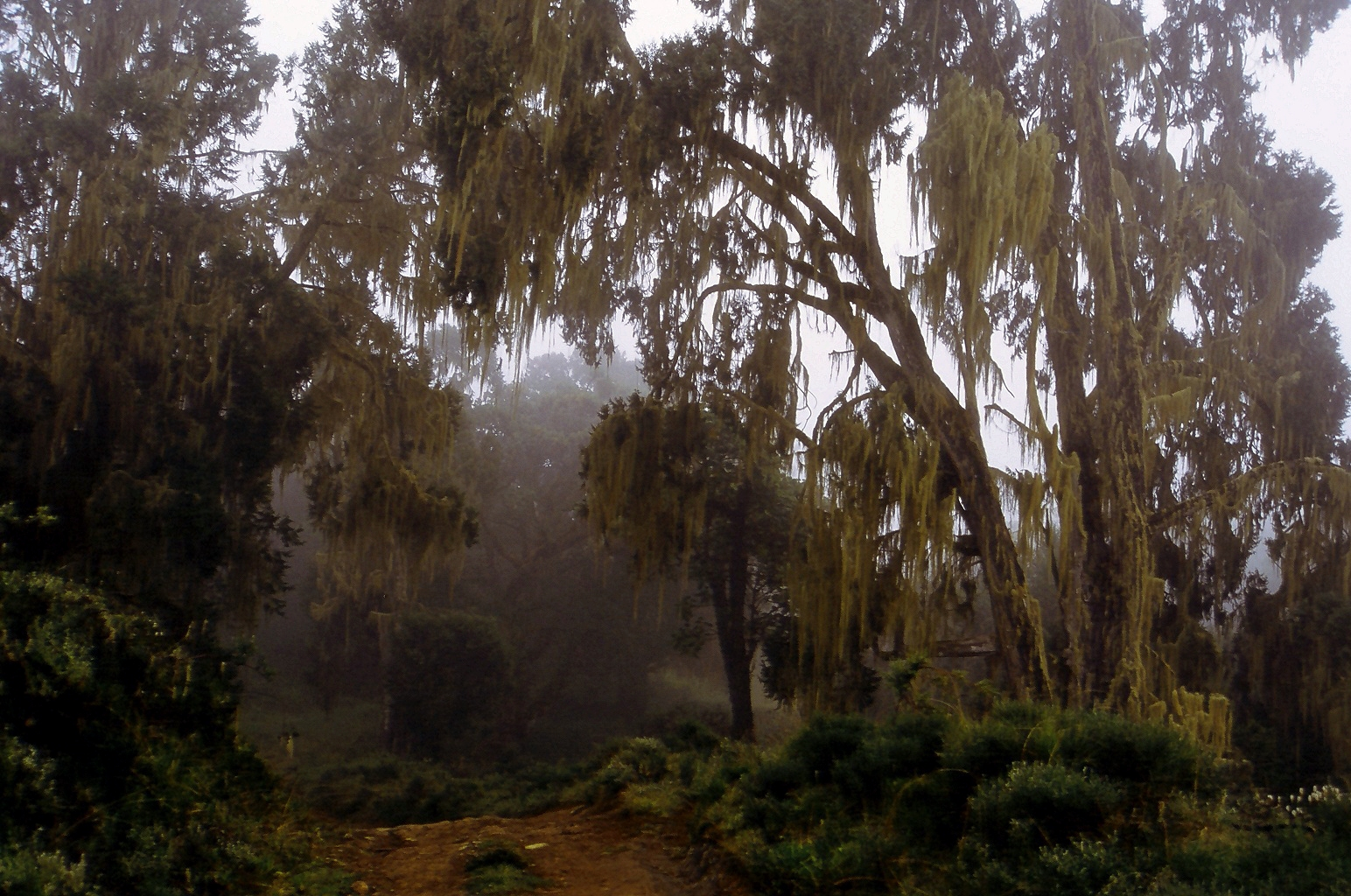
The timberline forest is commonly in cloud. The trees are relatively small and covered in lichens and mosses.

Above the bamboo is the timberline forest. The trees here are often smaller than the trees in the forests lower down the mountain. The forest here is more intact because it is less accessible and better protected.

When the trees can no longer grow the vegetation changes into heathland and chaparral, at around 3,000 m (9,800 ft). Heathland is found in the wetter areas, on the west side of Mount Kenya, and is dominated by giant heathers. Chaparral is found in drier areas and grasses are more common. and bushfires still occur.

As the altitude increases the temperature fluctuations become extreme and the air becomes thinner and drier. This region is known as the Afro-alpine zone. The environment here is isolated, with the only similar area nearby being the Aberdares, which are 80 km (50 mi) away. Many of the species here are endemic, with adaptations to the cold and fluctuating temperatures. Typical plants here include giant groundsels (senecios) and giant lobelias.

The region where the glaciers have recently retreated from is nival zone. It is the area that plants have not yet been able to colonise.

=== Flora ===
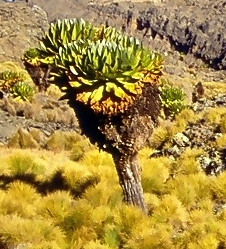
Many plants that live on Mount Kenya, like this Senecio keniodendron, have to be specially adapted to the extremes in temperature.

The flora found on Mount Kenya varies with altitude, aspect, and exposure. As the altitude increases, the plants have to be more specialised, with adaptations to strong sunlight with ultraviolet, lower mean temperatures, and freezing night temperatures.

Plants in the Afro-alpine zone have overcome these difficulties in several ways. One adaptation is known as the giant rosette, which is exhibited by giant senecio, giant lobelia, and giant thistle (Carduus), which use bud leaves to protect their buds from freezing. Giant rosette senecios form single-aged stands that drive community structure over decades.

Many plant species in the Afro-alpine zone of Mount Kenya are giant versions of lowland (or temperate) relatives. However, nearer the nival zone the plants decrease in size again.

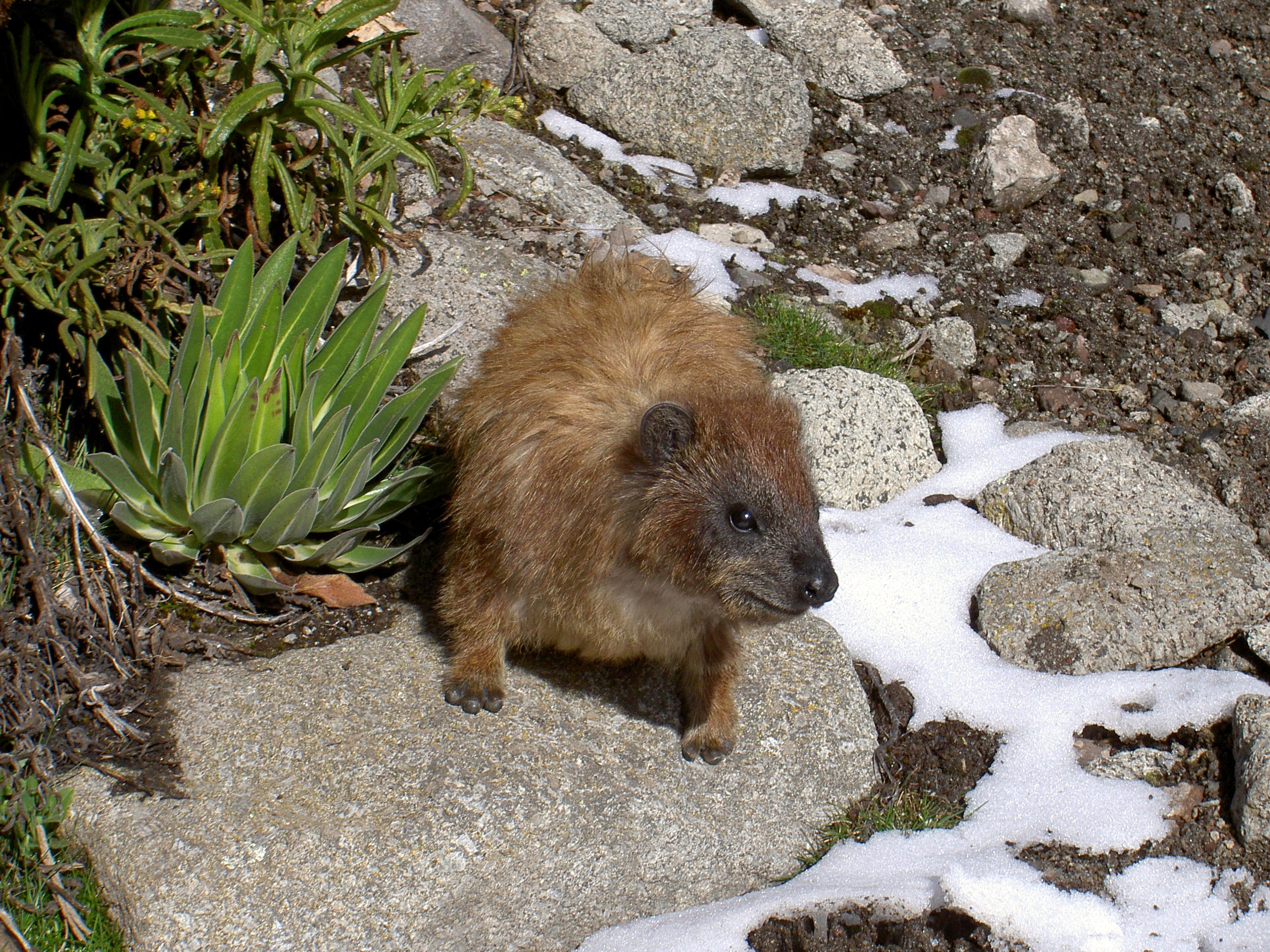
Hyrax can cope with a more extreme climate and are found up to the highest elevation.

=== Fauna ===
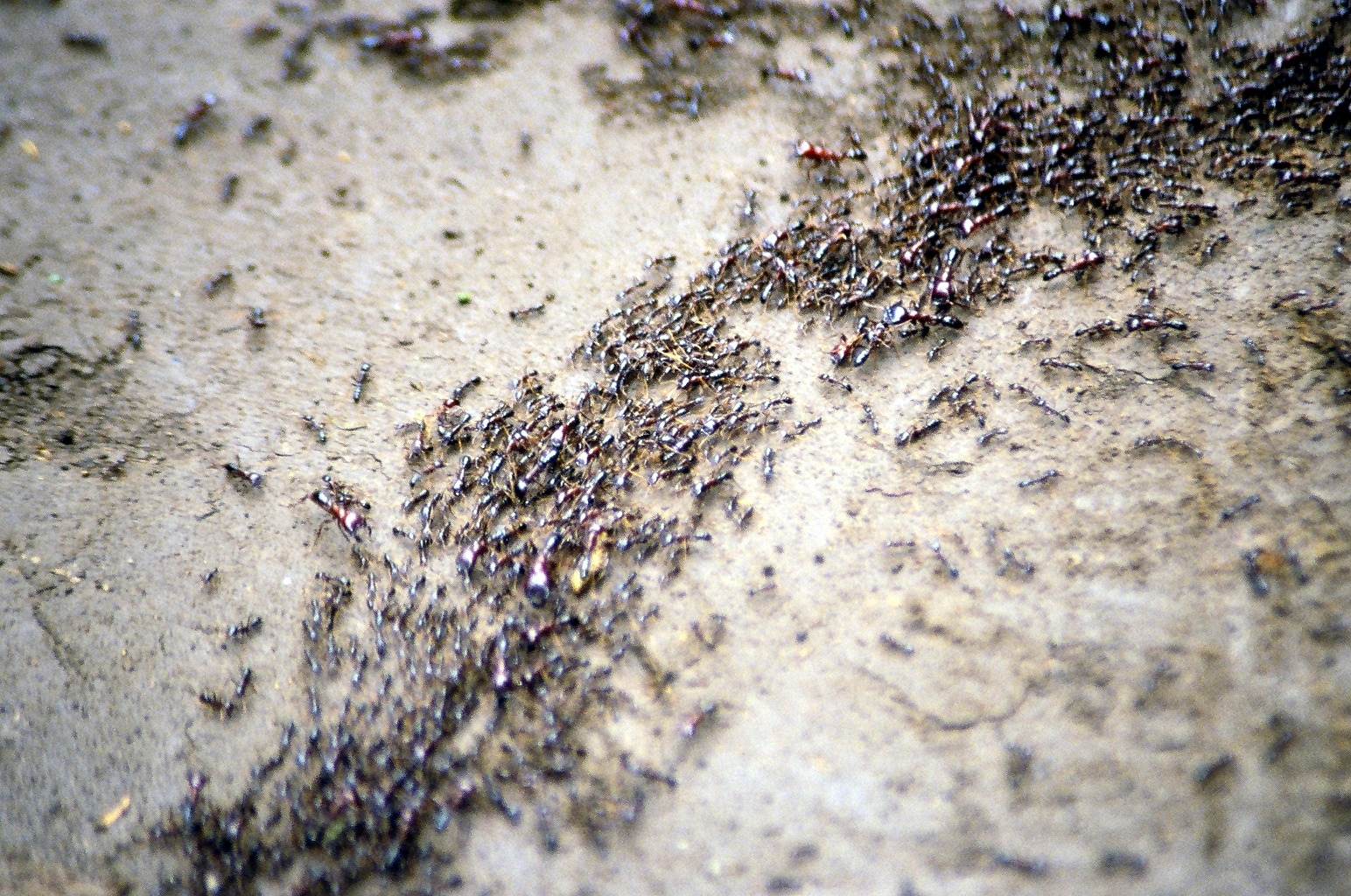
Safari ants swarm around the forest in long columns. They are easiest to see when they cross the tracks.

The majority of animals live lower down on the slopes of Mount Kenya. Here there is more vegetation and the climate is less extreme. Various species of monkeys, several antelopes, tree hyrax, porcupines, and some larger animals such as elephants and buffalo all live in the forest. Predators found here include hyenas and leopards, and occasionally lions.

There are fewer mammals found at high altitudes on Mount Kenya. The Mount Kenya hyrax and common duiker can live here, and are important to the ecosystem. Some smaller mammals, such as the groove-toothed rat, can live here by burrowing into the giant senecios and using their thick stem of dead leaves as insulation. The Mount Kenya mole-rat Tachyoryctes rex occurs at high altitudes, living in visible mounds. Leopards are resident in the alpine zone.

Other mammal species are only occasional visitors. Remains of elephants, monkeys, and bongo have been found high in the alpine zone, and other sightings are remembered in names such as Simba Tarn (simba means lion in Swahili).

Several bird species live in the Afro-alpine zone, including sunbirds, alpine chats and starlings and the raptors, augur buzzard, lammergeier and Verreaux's eagle, the latter of which specializes in hunting hyraxes. Birds are important in this ecosystem as pollinators.

== Climate ==
The climate of Mount Kenya has played a critical role in the development of the mountain, influencing the topography and ecology amongst other factors. It has a typical equatorial mountain climate which Hedberg described as winter every night and summer every day. Mount Kenya is home to one of the Global Atmosphere Watch's atmospheric monitoring stations.

=== Seasons ===
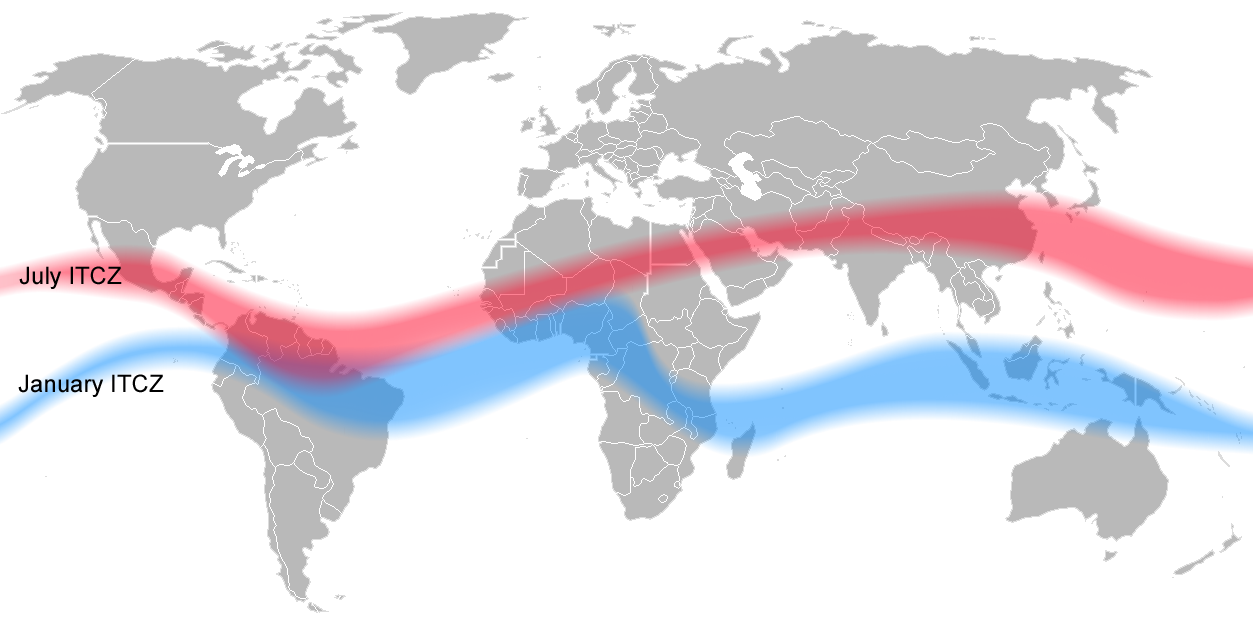
In January the Intertropical Convergence Zone is at its southern extreme over the Indian Ocean. In July it is at its northern extreme over Tibet and Arabia. As it passes over the equator, Mount Kenya experiences a wet season.

The year is divided into two distinct wet seasons and two distinct dry seasons which mirror the wet and dry seasons in the Kenyan lowlands. As Mount Kenya ranges in height from 1,374 to 5,199 m (4,508 to 17,057 ft), the climate varies considerably over the mountain and has different zones of influence. The lower, southeastern slopes are the wettest as the predominant weather system comes from the Indian Ocean. This rainfall supports dense montane forests on these slopes. High on the mountain most of the precipitation falls as snow. Combined, these water sources feed 11 glaciers.

The current climate on Mount Kenya is wet, but drier than it has been in the past. The temperatures span a wide range, which diminishes with altitude. In the lower alpine zone temperature usually do not go below 12 °C (54 °F). Snow and rain are common from March to December, but especially in the two wet seasons. The wet seasons combined account for 5/6 or 83% of the annual precipitation. The monsoon, which controls the wet and dry seasons, means that for most of the year there are south-easterly winds, but during January and February the dominant wind direction is north-easterly.

Mount Kenya, like most locations in the tropics, has two wet seasons and two dry seasons as a result of the monsoon. From mid-March to June the heavy rain season, known as the long rains, brings approximately half of the annual rainfall on the mountain. This is followed by the wetter of the two dry seasons which lasts until September. October to December are the short rains when the mountain receives approximately a third of its rainfall total. Finally from December to mid-March is the drier dry season when the mountain experiences the least rain.

=== Daily pattern ===
During the dry season, the mountain almost always follows the same daily weather pattern. Large daily temperature fluctuations occur which led Hedberg to exclaim winter every night and summer every day. There is variation in minimum and maximum temperatures day to day, but the standard deviation of the mean hourly pattern is small.

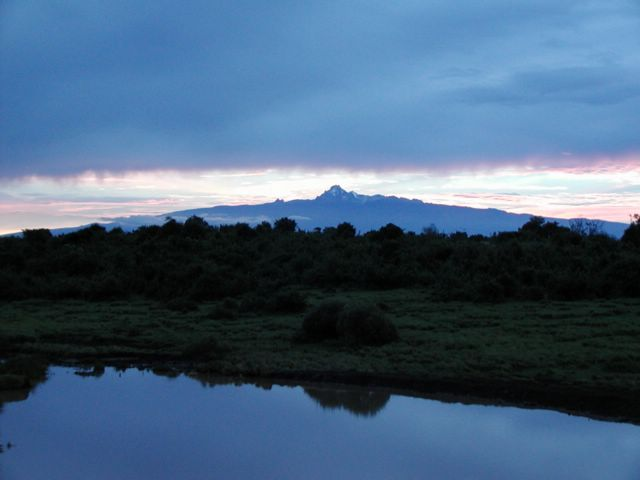
In the dry season, mornings are typically clear and cool, but the mountain is hidden in cloud by mid-day.

A typical day is clear and cool in the morning with low humidity. The mountain is in direct sunlight which causes the temperatures to rise quickly with the warmest temperatures occurring between 09:00 and 12:00. This corresponds to a maximum in the pressure, usually around 10:00. Low on the mountain, between 2,400 and 3,900 m (7,874 and 12,795 ft), clouds begin to form over the western forest zone, due to moist air from Lake Victoria. The anabatic winds caused by warm rising air gradually bring these clouds to the summit region in the afternoon. Around 15:00 there is a minimum in sunlight and a maximum in humidity causing the actual and perceived temperature to drop. At 16:00 there is a minimum of pressure. This daily cover of clouds protects the glaciers on the southwest of the mountain which would otherwise get direct sun every day, enhancing their melt. The upwelling cloud eventually reaches the dry easterly air streams and dissipates, leading to a clear sky by 17:00. There is another maximum temperature associated with this.

Being an equatorial mountain the daylight hours are constant with twelve-hour days. Sunrise is about 06:30 with the sun setting at 18:30 (both EAT = UTC+3). Over the year there is a one-minute difference between the shortest and longest days. At night, the sky is usually clear with katabatic winds blowing down the valleys. Above the lower alpine zone there is usually frost every night.

== Historical Inhabitants and Cultural Context ==
Mount Kenya is a central cultural and spiritual landmark. Although currently home to Central Bantu and some Nilotic peoples, the mountain's slopes have functioned as a historical crossroads for a diverse succession of linguistic and cultural groups over millennia.

=== Timeline of Human Habitation ===
The following table outlines the groups that have historically inhabited the Mount Kenya region.

Succession of Inhabitants around Mount Kenya
| Group | Period | Description and Legacy |
|---|---|---|
| Aboriginal Southern Nilotes (Okiek/Ogiek) | Pre-1000 BCE | The Okiek people, a subgroup of the Kalenjin, are the earliest documented hunter-gatherers of the montane forests. In the Kikuyu oral tradition, they are referred to as the Athi. Recognized as the region's original land custodians, their ongoing presence is marked by landmark legal victories, including the African Court on Human and Peoples' Rights ruling in 2017 (reaffirmed in 2022), which recognized their indigenous land rights in the forest water towers of the Mount Kenya and Aberdare ecosystems. They are officially characterized as Aboriginal people of Kenya. |
| Southern Cushites (Gumba, Yaaku) | c. 2000 BCE – 500 BCE | These early agro-pastoralists migrated from the Horn of Africa. Notable groups include the Gumba, remembered in oral history as skilled iron-smelters and potters who lived in pit dwellings, and the Yaaku (Mukogodo), who inhabited the northern slopes. They are credited with introducing livestock and early irrigation techniques before being largely assimilated by later Nilotic and Bantu populations. |
| Highland Nilotes (Kalenjin) | c. 500 BCE | The arrival of Southern Nilotes from the Nile Valley and Ethiopian Highlands reshaped regional societies by introducing age-set systems and circumcision rites, which were later adopted by Bantu groups. They shared a wealth of folklore and cultural traditions, including their reverence for the mountain they called Koilegen, meaning "White Mountain" or "Speckled Mountain" due to its snowy peaks. As the Bantu integrated these Nilotic influences into their own emerging traditions, the landmark became central to their spiritual identity as Kirinyaga, the "Mountain of Brightness." |
| Plain Nilotes (Maasai, Samburu) | c. 1000 CE | The Maasai, pastoralist groups who dominated the expansive plains surrounding the mountain, particularly in Laikipia, maintained a symbiotic yet volatile relationship with highland farmers, influencing regional trade and military tactics. They revered the peak as Ol Donyo Keri, an ancient name meaning "Mountain of Stripes" or "The Striped Mountain," referring to the distinct patterns of dark volcanic rock and white snow seen from the plains. To the Maasai, the mountain was one of the many homes of their deity, Enkai, and a sacred landmark where they believed their ancestors first descended from the heavens. This cultural reverence is still reflected in the naming of the mountain's highest peaks—Batian, Nelion, and Lenana—all named after famous Maasai Laibons (spiritual leaders). |
| Central Bantu (Kikuyu, Meru, Embu) | c. 1000 CE | Originating from the Nigeria-Cameroon borderlands in West-Central Africa, these agriculturalists migrated eastward across the Congo Basin. They reached the African Great Lakes before moving through the Taita Hills and the Mount Kilimanjaro corridor. Upon settling the fertile slopes of Mount Kenya, they developed a spiritual cosmology centered on the peaks, revering the mountain as Kirinyaga—the sacred "Mountain of Brightness" and the earthly throne of the deity Ngai. |

Map of the population around Mount Kenya

=== Cultural Significance ===
Mount Kenya serves as a profound cultural and spiritual anchor for a diverse mosaic of East African peoples. While it is primarily associated today with the Central Bantu most notably the Kikuyu, Meru, and Embu communities who revere the mountain as the dwelling of the deity Ngai—it is equally significant to Nilotic groups such as the Maasai, Okiek, and Samburu, who have historically utilized its slopes for grazing and spiritual ritual. This current cultural landscape is part of a deep historical succession; for several millennia, the mountain has been home to various linguistic groups, including ancient hunter-gatherer societies like the Gumba and Ogiek, whose presence predates the migration of modern agricultural and pastoralist communities.

== European documentation ==
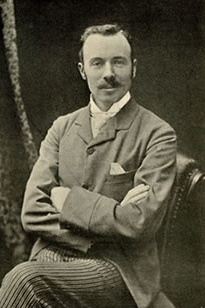
Joseph Thomson reached the foothills of Mount Kenya and confirmed Krapf's discovery.

The first European to report seeing Mount Kenya was Dr Johann Ludwig Krapf, a German missionary, from Kitui, a town 150 km (90 mi) away from the mountain. The sighting was made on 3 December 1849, a year after the first sighting of Mount Kilimanjaro by a European.

Krapf was told by the Embu people that lived around the mountain that they did not ascend high enough on the mountain because of the intense cold and the white matter that rolled down the mountains with a loud noise. This led him to infer that glaciers existed on the mountain. It was Krapf who gave the mountain the name "Kenya", but the derivation of this is not known with certainty.

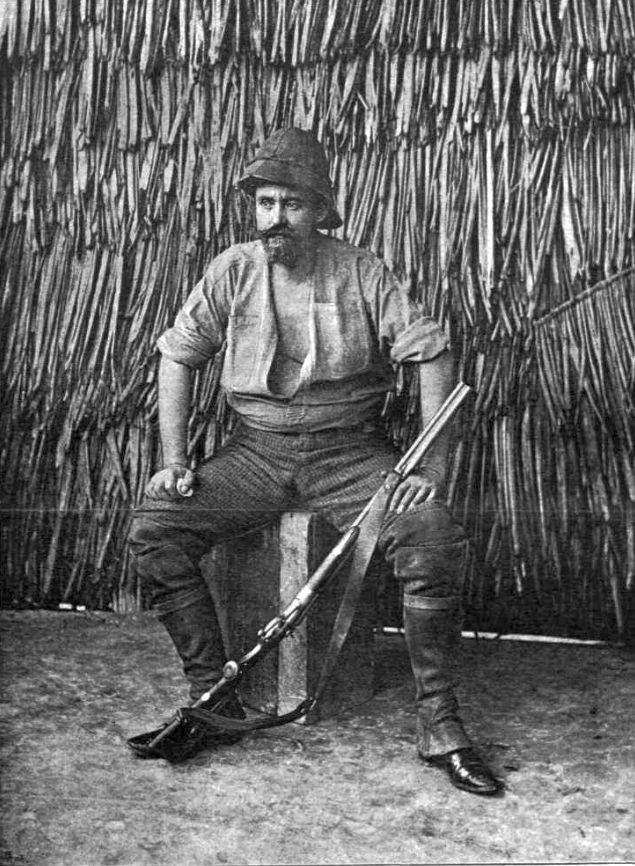
Count Sámuel Teleki was the first European to set foot on Mount Kenya. His expedition reached 4,350 m (14,270 ft).

Krapf also noted that the rivers flowing from Mount Kenya, and other mountains in the area, were continuously flowing. This was very different from the other rivers in the area, which swelled up in the wet season and completely dried up after the rainy season had ended. As the streams flowed even in the driest seasons he concluded that there must be a source of water up on the mountain, in the form of glaciers. He believed the mountain to be the source of the White Nile.

In 1851 Krapf returned to Kitui. He travelled 65 kilometres (40 mi) closer to the mountain, but did not see it again. In 1877 Hildebrandt was in the Kitui area and heard stories about the mountain, but also did not see it. Since there were no confirmations to back up Krapf's claim people began to be suspicious.

In 1883 Joseph Thomson passed close by the west side of the mountain and confirmed Krapf's claim. He diverted his expedition and reached 1,737 m (5,700 ft) up the slopes of the mountain but had to retreat because of trouble with local people. The first European exploration high onto the mountain was achieved in 1887 by Count Sámuel Teleki. He managed to reach 4,350 m (14,270 ft) on the southwestern slopes. On this expedition Teleki mistakenly believed he had found the crater of a volcano.

In 1892, Teleki and von Höhnel returned to the eastern side but were unable to get through the forest.

In 1893, an expedition managed to ascend Mount Kenya as far as the glaciers. This expedition was traveling from the coast to Lake Baringo in the Rift Valley and was led by Dr. John W Gregory, a British geologist. They managed to ascend the mountain to around 4,730 m (15,520 ft) and spent several hours on the Lewis Glacier with their guide. On his return to Britain, Gregory published papers and a narrative account of his achievements.

George Kolb, a German physician, made expeditions in 1894 and 1896 and was the first to reach the moorlands on the east side of the mountain. More exploration occurred after 1899 when the Uganda Railway was completed as far as the future site of Nairobi.

=== Mackinder's expedition ===
On 28 July 1899, Sir Halford John Mackinder set out from the site of Nairobi on an expedition to Mount Kenya. The members of the expedition consisted of 6 Europeans, 66 Swahilis, 2 Maasai guides, and 96 Kikuyu. The Europeans were Campbell B. Hausberg, second in command and photographer; Douglas Saunders, botanist; C F Camburn, taxidermist; Cesar Ollier, guide; and Josef Brocherel, guide, and porter. The expedition made it as far as the mountain but encountered many difficulties on the way. The country they passed through was full of plague and famine. Many Kikuyu porters tried to desert with women from the villages, and others stole from the villages, which made the chiefs very hostile towards the expedition. When they reached the base camp on 18 August, they could not find any food, suffered two of their party killed by the local people, and eventually had to send Saunders to Naivasha to get help from Captain Gorges, the Government Officer there.

Mackinder pushed on up the mountain and established a camp at 3,142 m (10,310 ft) in the Höhnel Valley. He made his first attempt on the summit on 30 August with Ollier and Brocherel up the southeast face, but they had to retreat when they were within 100 m (330 ft) of the summit of Nelion due to nightfall.

On 5 September, Hausberg, Ollier, and Brocherel made a circuit of the main peaks looking for an easier route to the summit. They could not find one. On 11 September Ollier and Brocherel made an ascent of the Darwin Glacier, but were forced to retreat due to a blizzard.

When Saunders returned from Naivasha with the relief party, Mackinder had another attempt at the summit with Ollier and Brocherel. They traversed the Lewis Glacier and climbed the southeast face of Nelion. They spent the night near the gendarme and traversed the snowfield at the head of the Darwin Glacier at dawn before cutting steps up the Diamond Glacier. They reached the summit of Batian at noon on 13 September 1899 and descended by the same route.

During the expedition, Mackinder ordered for 8 of the 90 African porters, who he had bought from a slave owner to carry his supplies, to be shot.

=== 1900–1930 ===
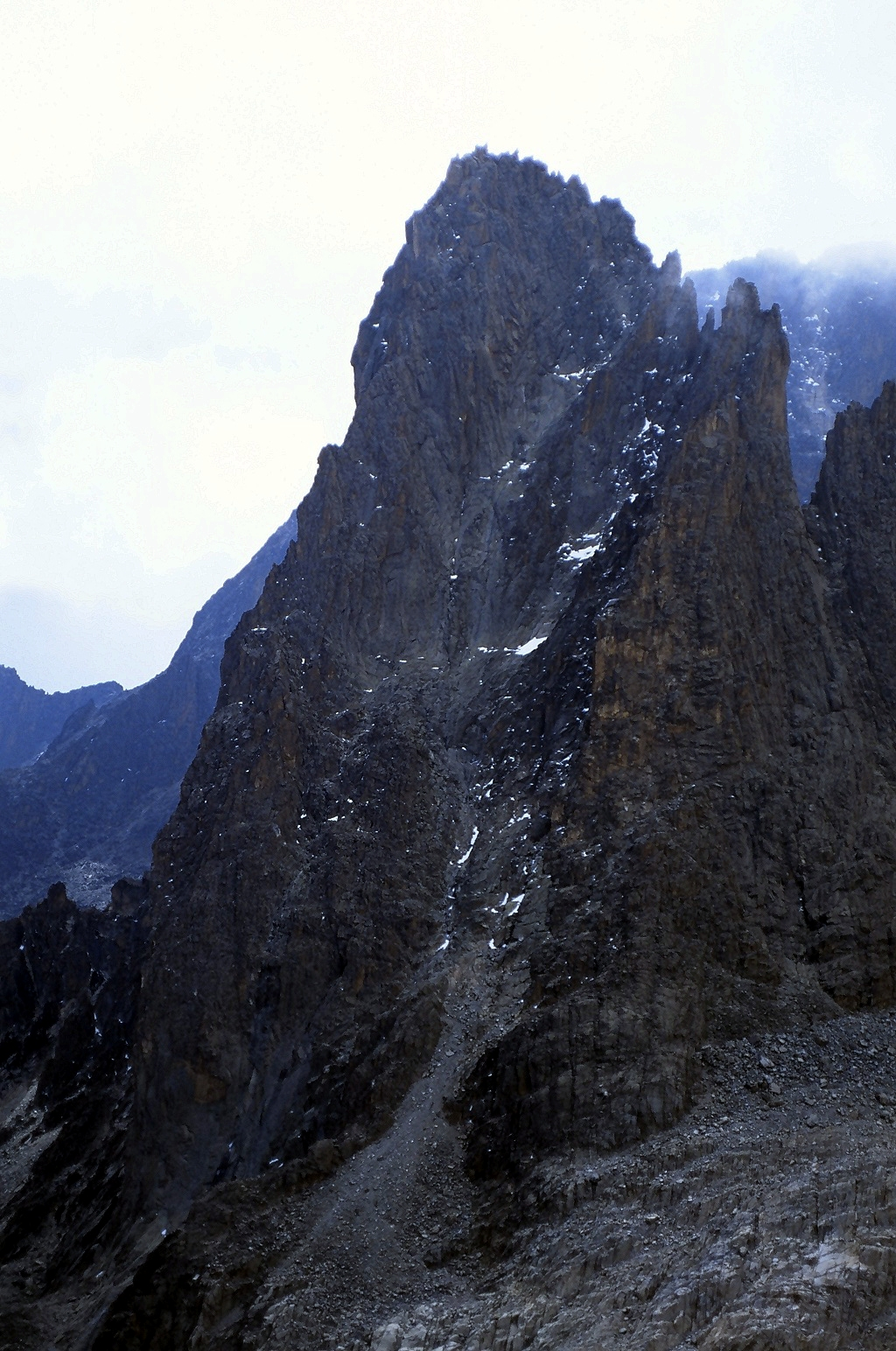
Shipton and Russell made the first ascent of Point John up the south-east gully in 1929

After the first ascent of Mount Kenya, there were fewer expeditions there for a while. The majority of the exploration until after the First World War was by settlers in Kenya, who were not on scientific expeditions. A Church of Scotland mission was set up in Chogoria, and several Scottish missionaries ascended to the peaks, including Rev Dr. J. W. Arthur, G. Dennis and A. R. Barlow. There were other ascents, but none succeeded in summitting Batian or Nelion.

New approach routes were cleared through the forest, which made access to the area of the peak far easier. In 1920, Arthur and Sir Fowell Buxton tried to cut a route in from the south, and other routes came in from Nanyuki in the north, but the most commonly used was the route from the Chogoria mission in the east, built by Ernest Carr. Carr is also credited with building Urumandi and Top Huts.

On 6 January 1929, the first ascent of Nelion was made by Percy Wyn-Harris and Eric Shipton. They climbed the Normal Route, then descended to the Gate of Mists before ascending Batian. On 8 January they reascended, this time with G. A. Sommerfelt, and in December Shipton made another ascent with R. E. G. Russell. They also made the first ascent of Point John. During this year the Mountain Club of East Africa was formed.

At the end of July 1930, Shipton and Bill Tilman made the first traverse of the peaks. They ascended by the West Ridge of Batian, traversed the Gate of Mists to Nelion, and descended the Normal Route. During this trip, Shipton and Tilman made the first ascents of several other peaks, including Point Peter, Point Dutton, Midget Peak, Point Pigott, and either Terere or Sendeyo.

=== 1931 to present day ===
In the early 1930s, there were several visits to the moorlands around Mount Kenya, with fewer as far as the peaks. Raymond Hook and Humphrey Slade ascended to map the mountain, and stocked several of the streams with trout. By 1938 there had been several more ascents of Nelion. In February, Miss C Carroll and Mtu Muthara became the first woman and African respectively to ascend Nelion, in an expedition with Noel Symington, author of The Night Climbers of Cambridge, and on 5 March Miss Una Cameron became the first woman to ascend Batian.

During the Second World War there was another drop in the ascents of the mountain. The most remarkable ascent during this period was by three Italians who were being held in a British POW camp at the base of the mountain in Nanyuki. They escaped from camp to climb the mountain's third peak, Point Lenana, before "escaping" back into camp. Felice Benuzzi, the team leader, retold his story in the book No Picnic on Mount Kenya (1946).

In 1949 the Mountain Club of Kenya split from the Mountain Club of East Africa, and the area above 3,400 m (11,150 ft) was designated a National Park. A road was built from Naro Moru to the moorlands, allowing easier access.

Many new routes were climbed on Batian and Nelion in the next three decades, and in October 1959 the Mountain Club of Kenya produced their first guide to Mount Kenya and Kilimanjaro. On Kenyan independence in 1963, Kisoi Munyao raised the Kenyan flag at the top of the mountain. He died in 2007 and was given a heroic funeral attended by the Kenyan president Mwai Kibaki. In the early 1970s the Mount Kenya National Park Mountain Rescue Team was formed, and by the end of the 1970s, all major routes on the peaks had been climbed.

On 19 July 2003, a South African registered aircraft, carrying 12 passengers and two crew, crashed into Mount Kenya at Point Lenana; nobody survived. This was not the first aircraft lost on the mountain; there is also the wreckage of at least one helicopter that crashed before 1972. In 2008, a Bell helicopter crashed during takeoff into Lake Michaelson and sank, killing one person.

In March 2012 a massive fire raged on Mount Kenya, devouring thousands of hectares of ancient forests and endangered wildlife.

== Mountaineering ==
Video from a hike on Mount Kenya

=== Climbing routes ===
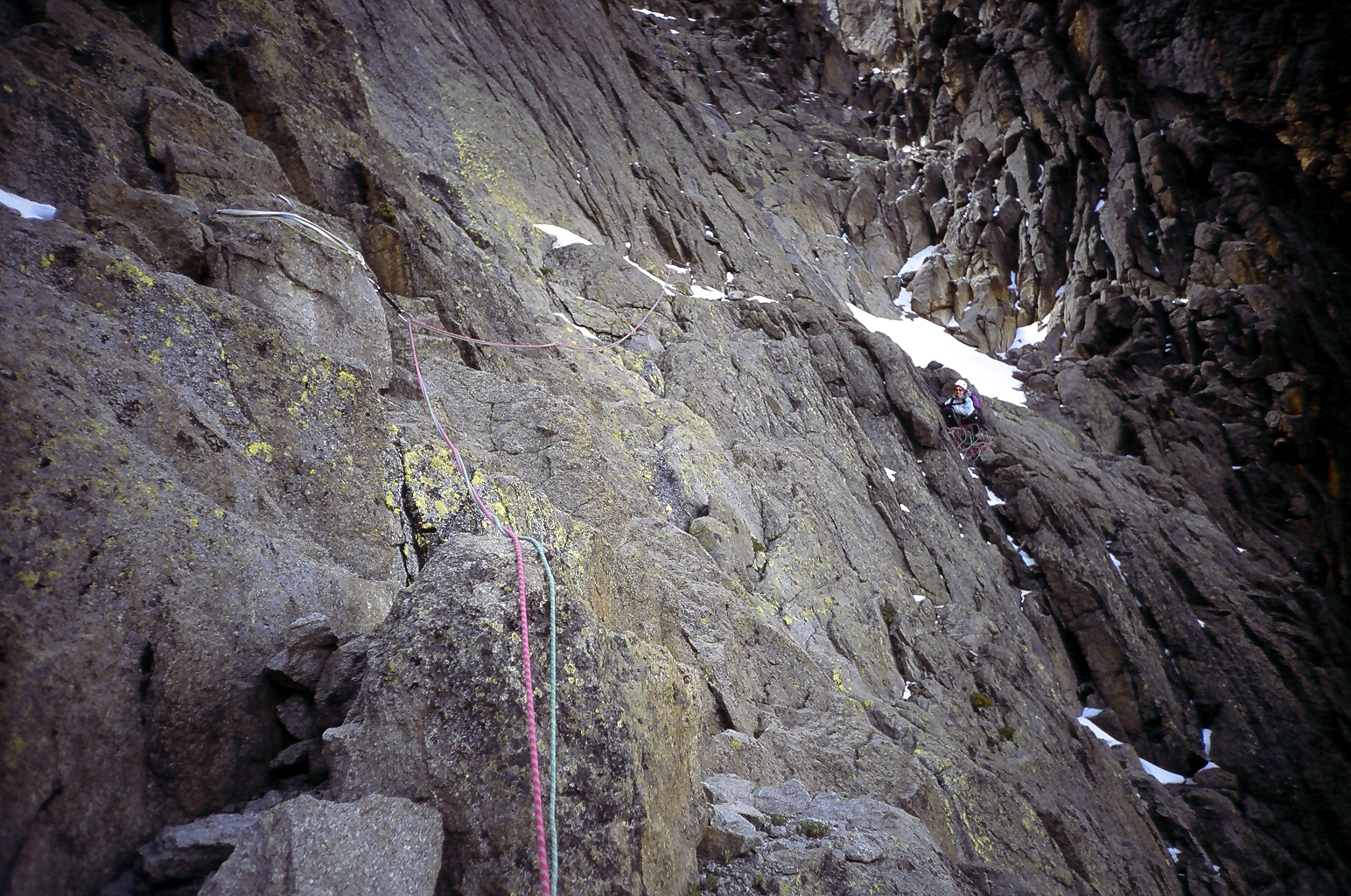
There are many peaks on Mount Kenya that require rock climbing.

Most of the peaks on Mount Kenya have been summited. The majority of these involve rock climbing as the easiest route, although some only require a scramble or a walk. The highest peak that can be ascended without climbing is Point Lenana, 4,985 m (16,355 ft). The majority of the 15,000 visitors to the national park each year climb this peak. In contrast, approximately 200 people summit Nelion and 50 summit Batian, the two highest peaks.

When ascended directly, Batian is usually climbed via the North Face Standard Route, UIAA grade IV+ (or 5.6+ YDS). The first recorded ascent of Batian was on 13 September 1899 by Sir Halford John Mackinder, Cesar Ollier, and Josef Brocherel. The Normal Route is the most climbed route up Nelion, and thence across to Batian. It was first climbed by Eric Shipton and Percy Wyn-Harris on 6 January 1929. It is possible to traverse between the two peaks, via the Gates of Mist, but this often involves spending a night in the Howell hut on top of Nelion. There is a bolted abseil descent route off Nelion.

Mount Kenya's climbing seasons are a result of its location only 20 km (12 mi) from the equator. During the northern summer, the rock routes on the north side of the peak are in good summer condition, while at the same time, the ice routes on the south side of the peak are in prime shape. The situation is reversed during the southern summer. The two seasons are separated by several months of the rainy season before and after, during which climbing conditions are generally unfavorable.

Mount Kenya is home to several good ice routes, the two most famous being the Diamond Couloir and the Ice Window route. Snow and ice levels on the mountain have been retreating at an accelerated rate in recent years, making these climbs increasingly difficult and dangerous. The Diamond Couloir, a steep ice couloir fed by the fusion of the upper Diamond Glacier, was first climbed by National Park staff Phil Snyder and Thumbi Mathenge in October 1973. A direct finish was pioneered in 1975 by Yvon Chouinard and Michael Covington The couloir was once climbable in summer or winter but now is virtually unclimbable in summer conditions and is seldom deemed in climbable condition even in winter. Last climbing reports describe the route very difficult, especially in the lower section. The route has changed into a modern ice climb with a very difficult 60m first pitch, starting with 8m of overhanging M7 dry tooling, followed by 50m of USA Grade V ice and by 6 pitches of moderate climbing on good ice and finally one pitch of water ice USA Grade IV+ ice at the headwall before getting to the Upper Diamond Glacier.

The satellite peaks around the mountain also provide good climbs. These can be climbed in Alpine style and vary in difficulty from a scramble to climbing at UIAA grade VI. They are useful for acclimatisation before climbing the higher peaks and as ascents in their own right.

=== Walking routes ===
Map showing the walking routes and huts around Mount Kenya

There are eight walking routes up to the main peaks. Starting clockwise from the north these are the: Meru, Chogoria, Kamweti, Naro Moru, Burguret, Sirimon, and Timau Routes. Of these Chogoria, Naro Moru, and Sirimon are used most frequently and therefore have staffed gates. The other routes require special permission from the Kenya Wildlife Service to use.

The Chogoria route leads from Chogoria town up to the peaks circuit path. It heads through the forest to the south-east of the mountain to the moorland, with views over areas such as Ithanguni and the Giant's Billiards Table before following the Gorges Valley past the Temple and up to Simba Col below Point Lenana. The Mountain Club of Kenya claims that Ithanguni and the Giant's Billiards Table offer some of the best hillwalking in Kenya.

The Naro Moru route is taken by many of the trekkers who try to reach Point Lenana. It can be ascended in only 3 days and has bunkhouses at each camp. The route starts at Naro Moru town to the west of the mountain and climbs towards Mackinder's Camp before joining the Peak Circuit Path. The terrain is usually good, although one section is called the Vertical Bog.

The Sirimon route approaches Mount Kenya from the northwest. The path splits on the moorlands, with the more frequently used fork following the Mackinder Valley and the quieter route traversing into the Liki North Valley. The paths rejoin at Shipton's Cave just below Shipton's Camp on the Peak Circuit Path.

The Peak Circuit Path is a path around the main peaks, with a distance of about 10 km (6 mi) and height gain and loss of over 2,000 m (6,600 ft). It can be walked in one day, but more commonly takes two or three. It can also be used to join different ascent and descent routes. The route does not require technical climbing.

Development is currently underway for a new route up the mountain starting from the Ragati conservancy and running up the ridge between the Naro Moru route and the old Kamweti trail.

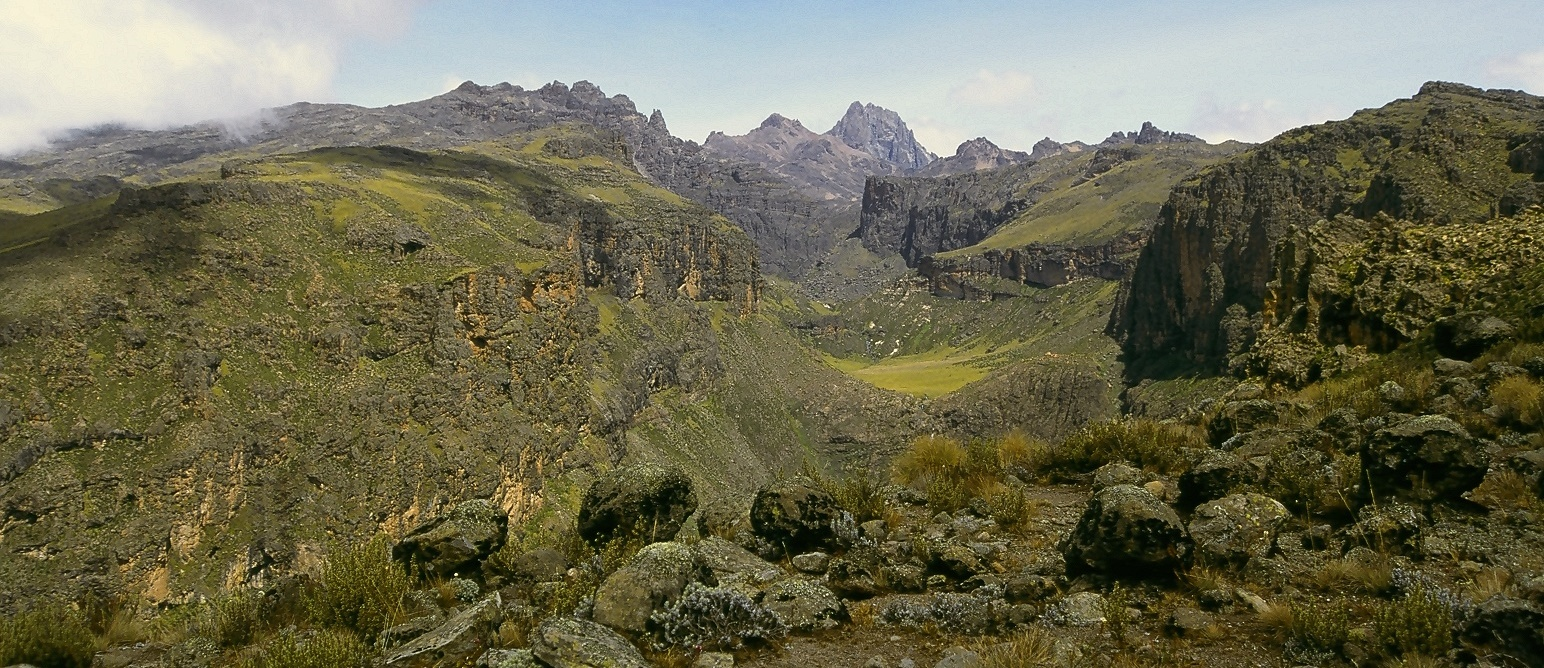
The Gorges Valley is a major feature on the Chogoria Route.

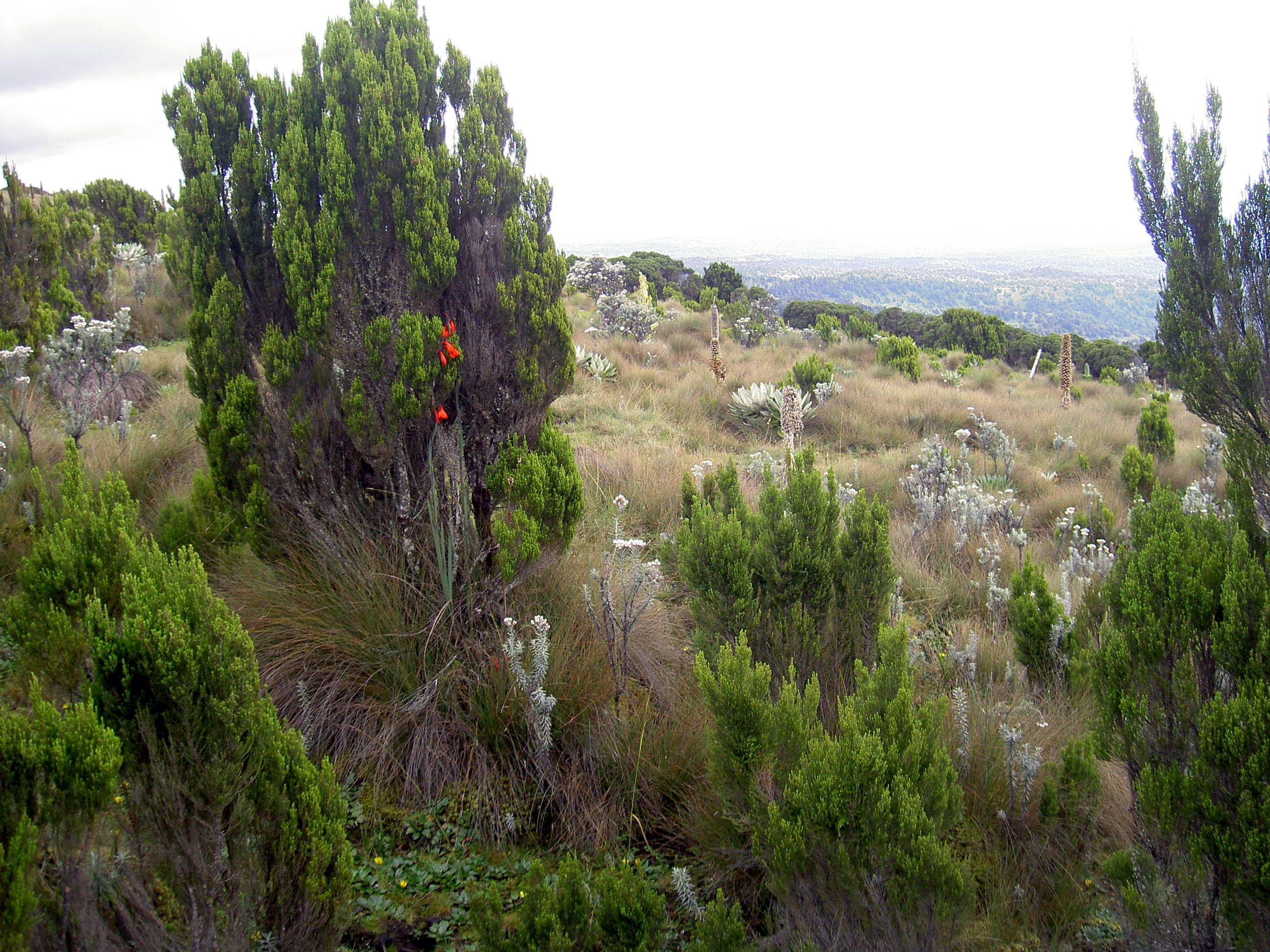
Vertical bog on Mount Kenya on the Naro Moru Route.

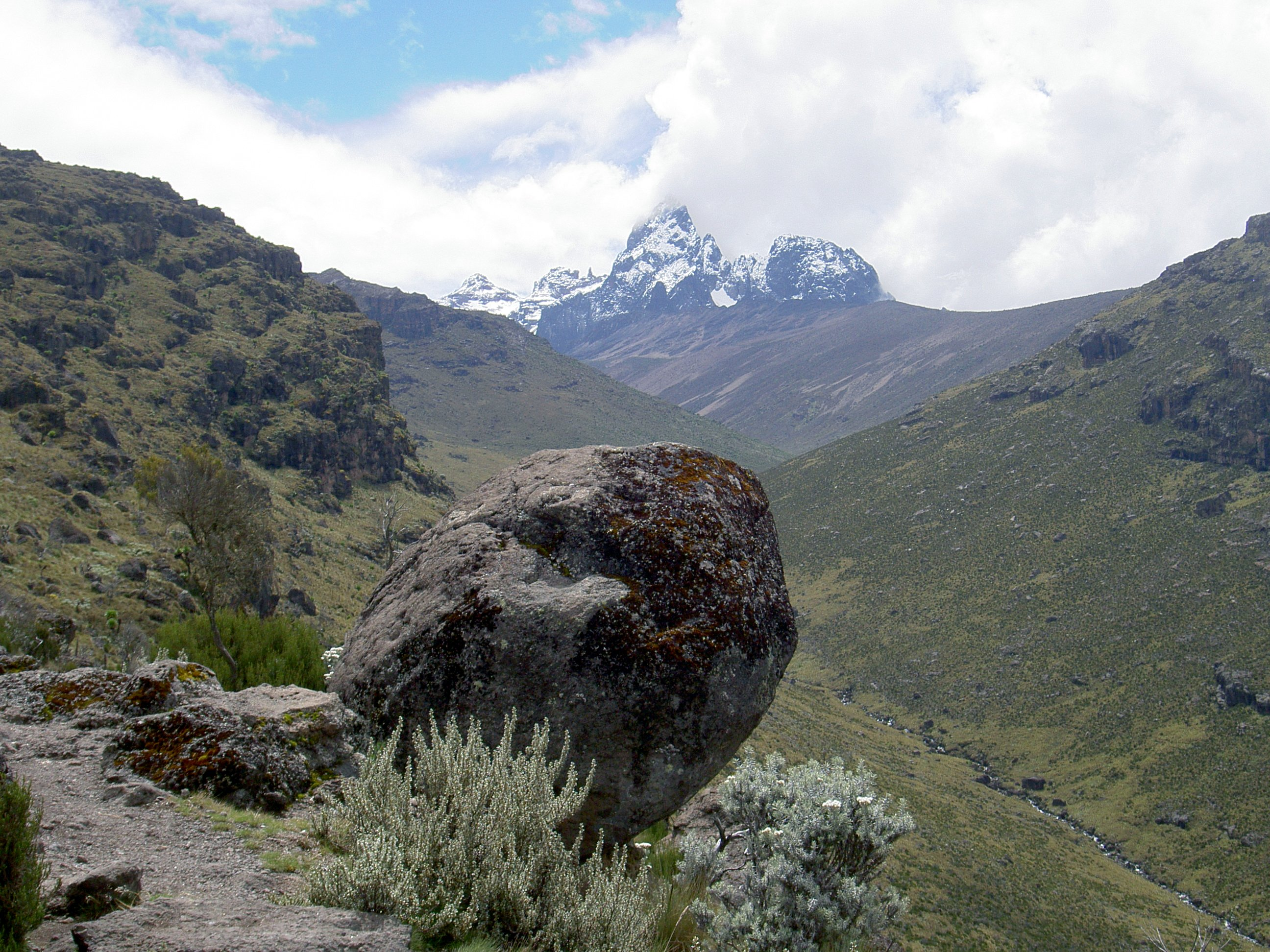
Looking towards the peaks up the Mackinder Valley on the Sirimon Route.
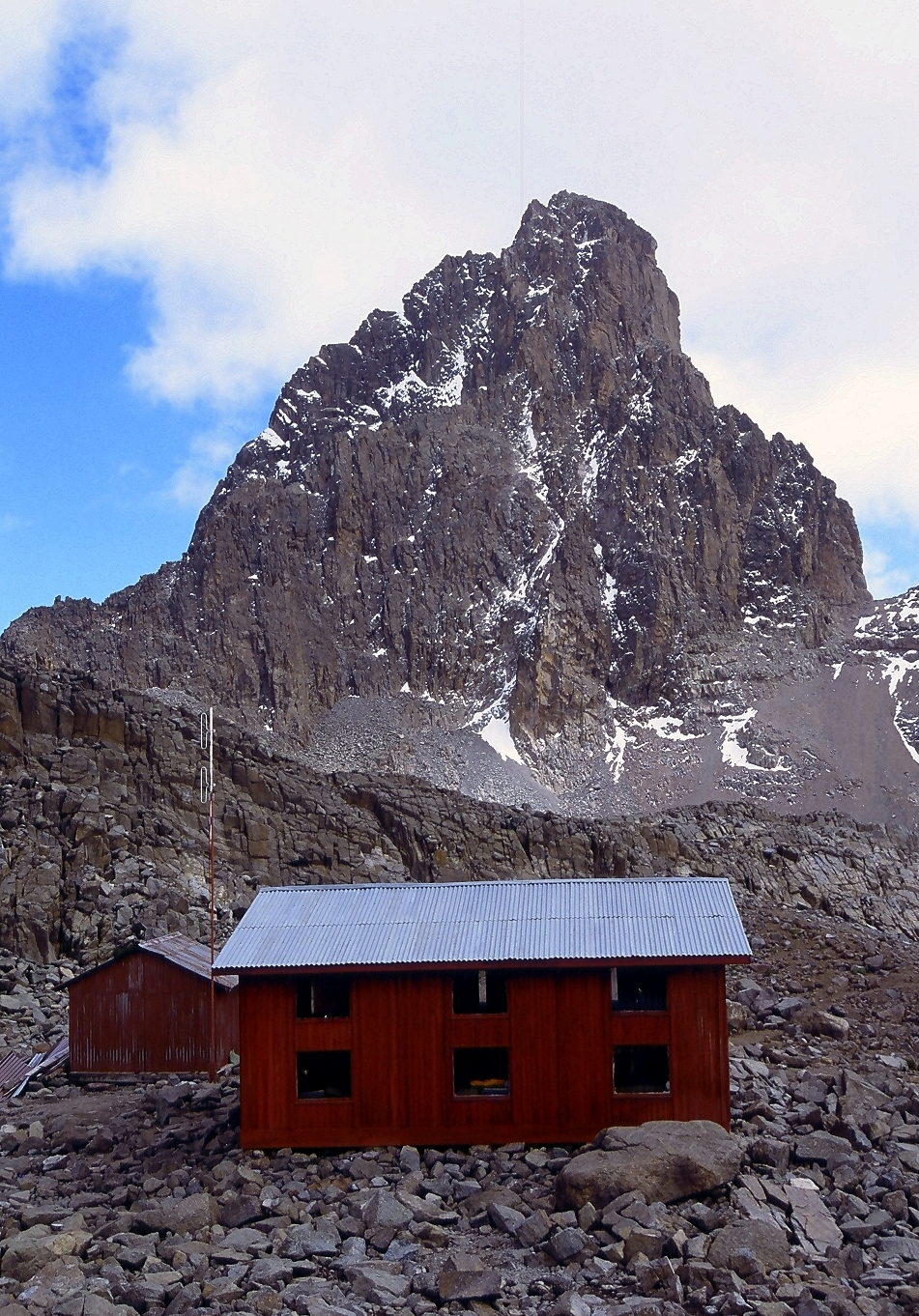
Austrian Hut is found near the Lewis Glacier on the slopes of Point Lenana. The hut sleeps 30 people, with Top Hut nearby for porters.

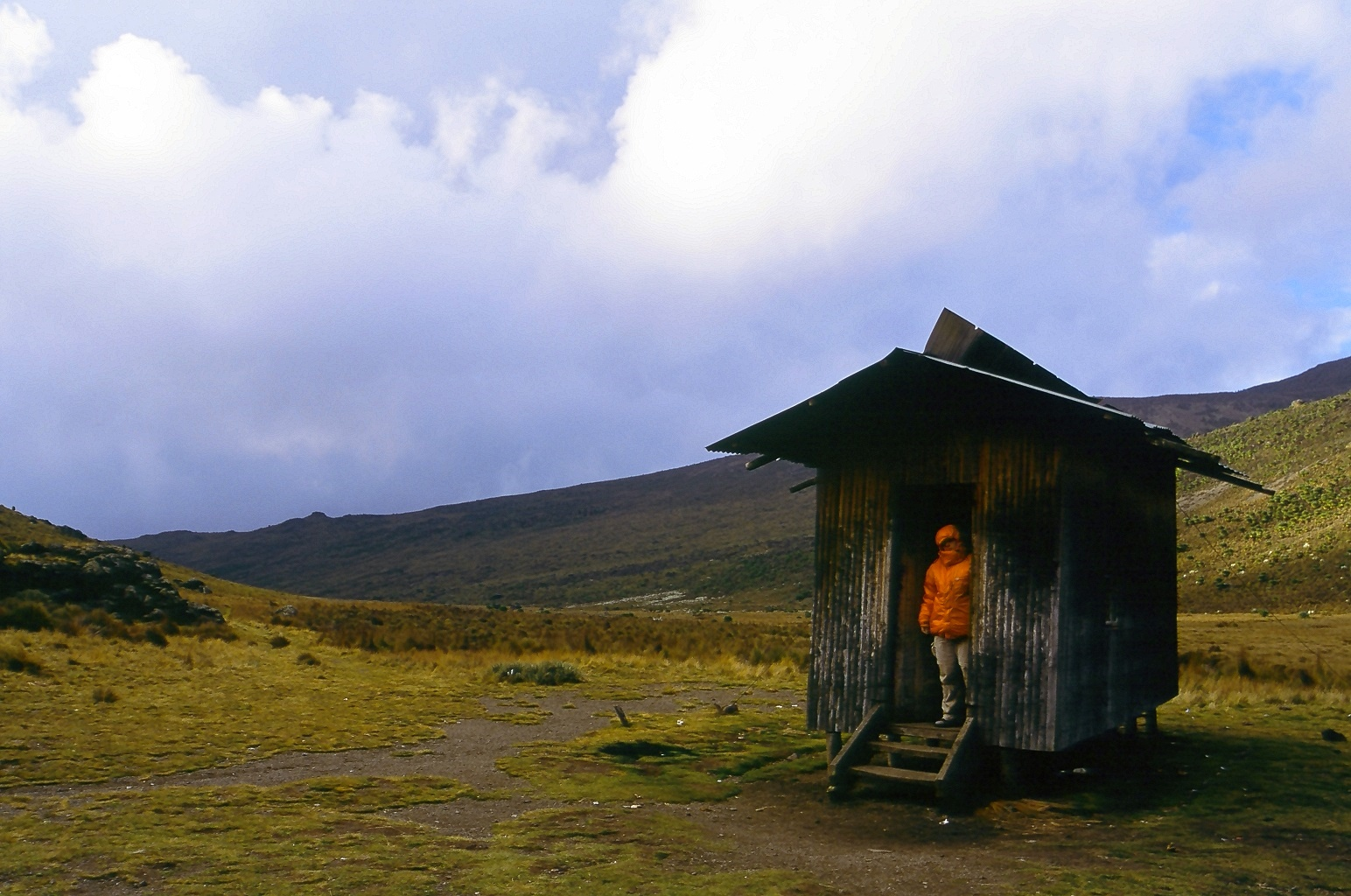
Liki North Hut is a small bothy in the Liki North Valley. It offers little more than shelter from the weather.

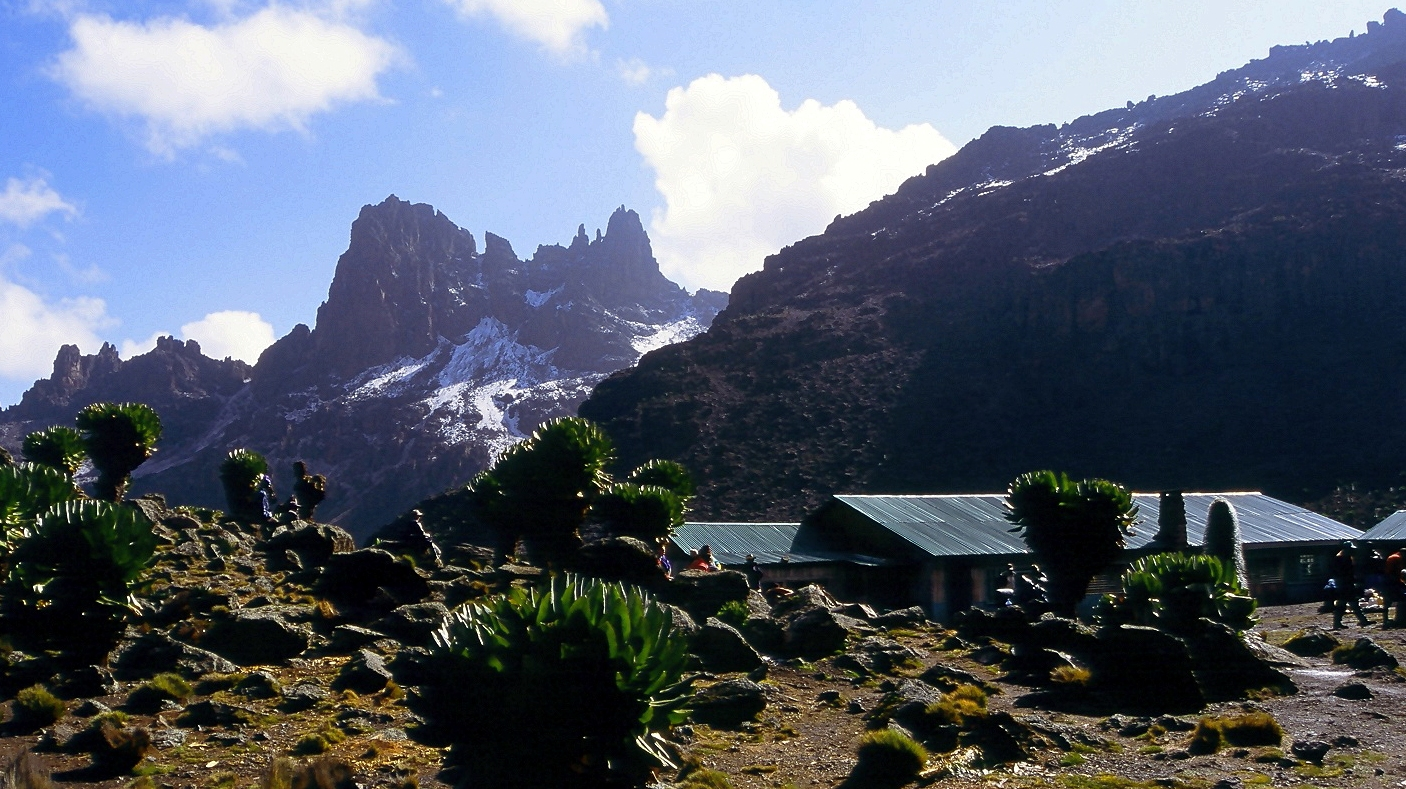
Shipton's Camp is at the top of the Sirimon Route. It has a large communal area and running cold water.

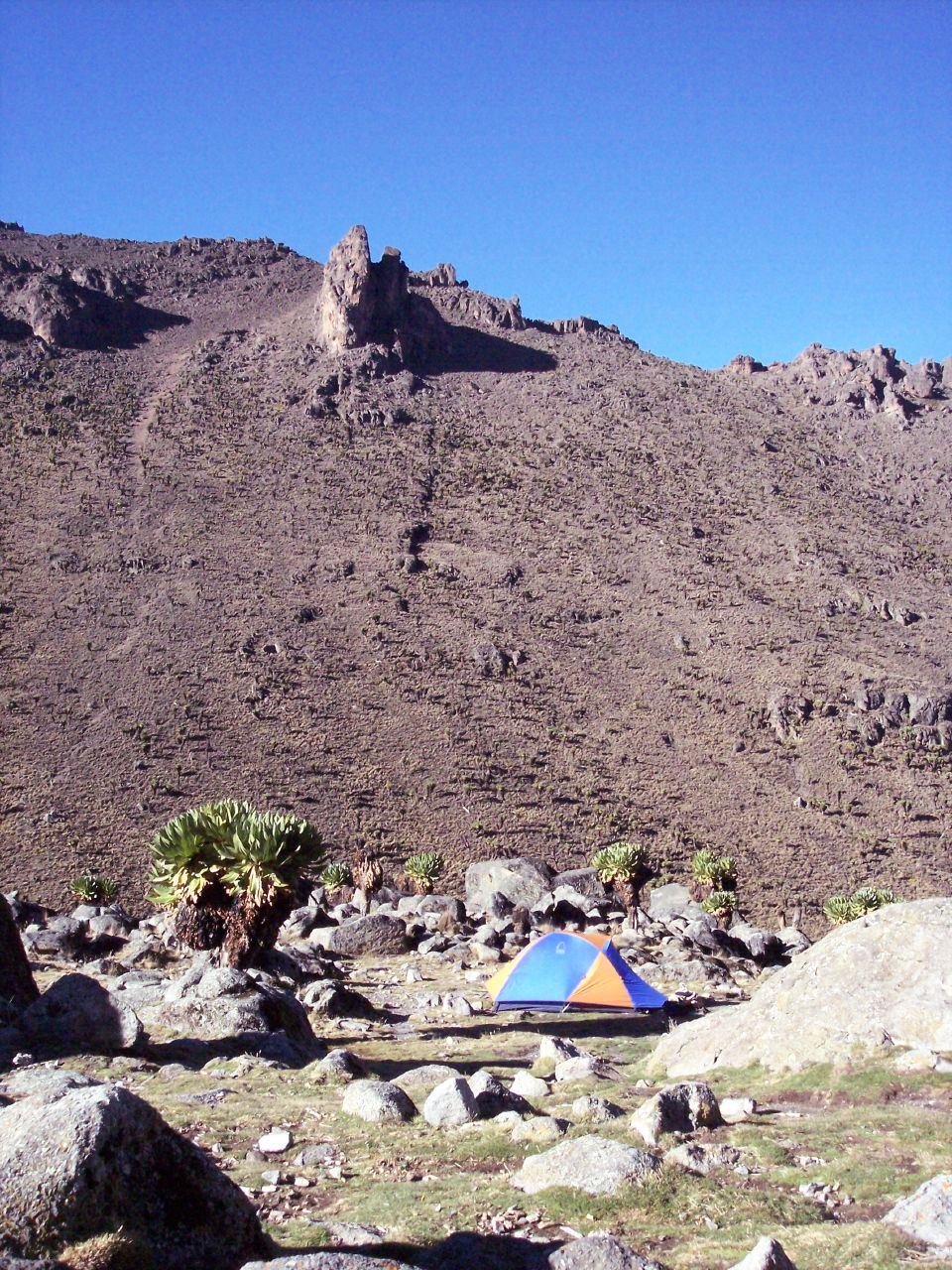
Camping is allowed anywhere within the National Park.

== Etymology ==
Kenya is a historic ethnolinguistic crossroads named after its highest peak, Mount Kenya. For centuries, the mountain served as a sacred landmark for diverse groups: the Kalenjin (Nilotic) called it Koilegen ("speckled rock"), the Maasai (Ol Donyo Keri), while the Kikuyu, Embu, and Kamba (Bantu) used variations like Kĩrĩnyaga or Kĩĩ-Nyaa ("mountain of whiteness" or "place of the ostrich"). While often interpreted as "God's resting place" due to its spiritual significance, the name is linguistically rooted in the visual contrast of the mountain's snow and dark rock. This convergence of Nilotic and Bantu identities at the mountain highlights Kenya's ancient status as a cultural meeting point in East Africa.

In the 19th Century, the German explorer, Ludwig Krapf, recorded the name as both Kenia and Kegnia, assumed by some to be a corruption of the Kamba version. Others however claim that this was on the contrary a very precise notation of the correct African pronunciation /ˈkɛnjə/. Wangari Maathai tells the following story about the naming: Krapf and Johannes Rebmann asked their guide (a member of the Kamba community who was carrying a gourd) what they called the mountain, and the guide (who assumed that the Germans were referring to the gourd) replied kĩĩ-nyaa, which became the name of the mountain and then the country. In any case, the name was for a long time pronounced by colonial-heritage Europeans as /ˈkiːnjə/. The European pronunciation has been abandoned in modern times, in favor of the African version.

=== Names of peaks ===
The peaks of Mount Kenya have been given names from three different sources. Firstly, several Maasai chieftains have been commemorated, with names such as Batian, Nelion, and Lenana. They commemorate Mbatian, a Maasai Laibon (Medicine Man), Nelieng, his brother, and Lenana and Sendeyo, his sons. Terere is named after another Maasai headman.

The second type of name that was given to peaks is after European climbers and explorers. Some examples of this are Shipton, Sommerfelt, Tilman, Dutton, and Arthur.

The remaining names are after well-known Kenyan personalities, except John and Peter, which were named by the missionary Arthur after two disciples. There is a group of four peaks to the east of the main peaks named after European settlers; Coryndon, Grigg, Delamere, and McMillan.

== See also ==
- Climate of Mount Kenya
- Mount Kenya region
- Mount Kenya National Park
- Natural history of Mount Kenya
- List of volcanoes in Kenya
- Volcanic Seven Summits
