= Rotundu =

Mountain peak in Kenya

Rotundu is a flat, heavily forested peak on the side of Mount Kenya. It's formed by a near-perpendicular wall raising from a height of approximately 3,100 metres (10,200 ft) above sea level and finally flattening 150 metres (490 ft) above the peak's base. The flat land on the peak also hosts Lake Rotundu (0.041242°S 37.463458°E. Some of the plants found on the peak are puzzling, as one would not expect to find them growing at that altitude.
