= Gendarme (mountaineering) =

Pinnacle of rock on a mountain ridge

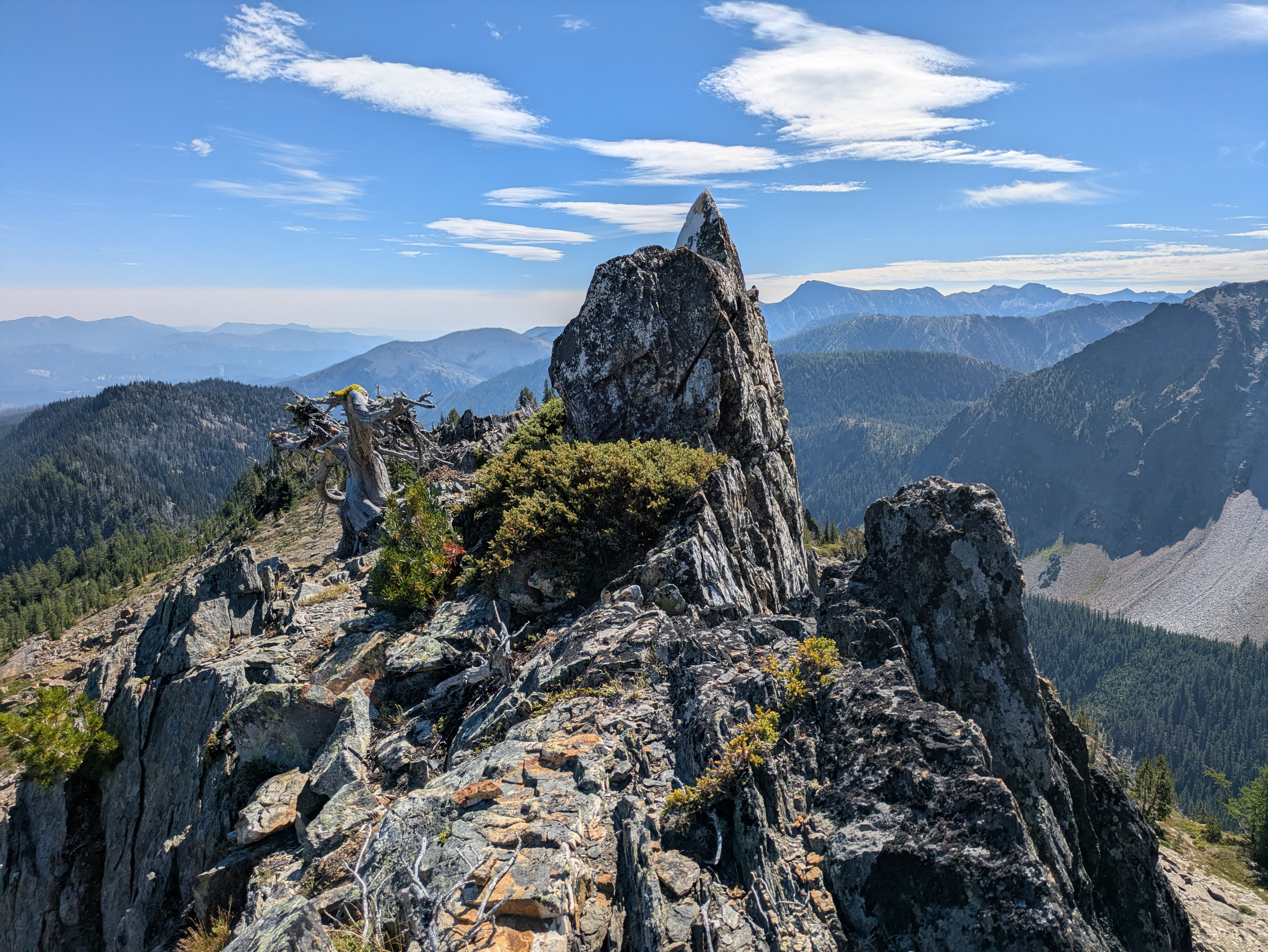
Gendarme on McCue Ridge in the Chiwaukum Mountains.

A gendarme is a pinnacle of rock on a mountain ridge. They are typical of alpine areas. Gendarmes often form on the intersection of two ridges due to the lower erosion of glaciers here. The name originates from the French Alps, where they were seen as resembling the gendarmerie police.
