= Archaeological Services Inc. =

ASI
- Industry: Archaeological and Cultural Heritage Consulting
- Founded: Toronto, Ontario, Canada (1980)
- Founders: Ronald F. Williamson
- Headquarters: Toronto and Burlington, Canada
- Number of locations: 3
- Area served: Ontario, Canada
- Key people: Partners Dr. Robert MacDonald, Dr. Katherine Hull, Lisa Merritt (MSc), Dr. Andrew Riddle, David Robertson (MA), and Rebecca Sciarra (MA)
- Services: Archaeological and cultural heritage consulting
- Number of employees: 52 full-time staff; 100 seasonal
- Website: asiheritage.ca

Archaeological Services Inc. (ASI) is the largest private archaeological and cultural heritage consulting company in Ontario (Canada), with offices in Toronto and Burlington. The company is a part of the Cultural Resource Management (CRM) industry.

== History ==
In Ontario, all land development projects, from urban condominiums and housing subdivisions, to highway expansions and infrastructure projects, require heritage assessment and mitigation of impacts before approvals are granted. Archaeological Services Inc. was established in 1980 to assist development proponents in meeting these requirements. The company was founded by chief archaeologist and managing partner, Dr. Ronald F. Williamson, with Debbie Steiss (MA), Dr. Robert MacDonald, Robert Pihl (MA) and Martin Cooper (MA) joining as partners in 2002.

The company began primarily with archaeological consultations but expanded to include a Cultural Heritage Division in the late 1990s; the services of that division now are: Built Heritage and Cultural Heritage Landscape Technical Services; Heritage Content Development and Planning; and Heritage Policy, Protocol, and Program Development. ASI's services include Environmental Assessment, Stage 1 and 2 Planning Act Assessment, Stage 3 and 4 Excavation, Geomatics, Predictive Modeling, Laboratory Services, Archaeological Management Plans and cemeteries.

The company ownership was transferred to a new generation of owners on October 1, 2016. The current managing partner is Dr. Robert MacDonald, who is joined by Dr. Katherine Hull, Lisa Merritt (MSc), Dr. Andrew Riddle, David Robertson (MA) and Rebecca Sciarra (MA) to form the leadership team. Dr. Ron Williamson and the original partners Martin Cooper, Robert Pihl and Deborah Steiss have retained an important advisory role within the company.

As of 2019, ASI employs approximately 67 full-time staff members and hires approximately 100 seasonal staff each field season. Most of the company's full-time archaeologists and many of the seasonal archaeologists are registered and licensed with the Ontario Ministry of Tourism, Culture and Sport, adhering to the ministry's licensing guidelines for consultant archaeologists.

== Public outreach ==
ASI is the only major Canadian archaeological consulting company to liaise on a regular basis with film and television producers, such as the History Channel, YAP Films and Ballinran Productions, for the production of popular historical documentaries, such as Death or Canada, Explosion 1812, Curse of the Axe, and Hangman's Graveyard, which feature ASI archaeological projects. ASI is also a major advocate for public outreach archaeology and works closely with Heritage Toronto, The City of Toronto, Royal Ontario Museum, Toronto Museum Project and The University of Toronto to engage the public in Ontario's heritage.

== Clients ==
ASI's clients have included the Federal Government of Canada, the Ontario Provincial Government, Regional and Municipal Governments, First Nations, Environmental and Engineering Consultants, Planning Consultants, Architectural and Legal Firms, Land Developers, Utilities and Museum and Heritage Organizations

== Major publications ==
- The Mantle Site: An Archaeological History of a Sixteenth Century Huron-Wendat Community (with Jennifer Birch), AltaMira Press (Series: Issues in Eastern Woodlands Archaeology, edited by Thomas Emerson and Timothy Pauketat), New York, 2012, 194p.
- Toronto: A Short Illustrated History of its First 12,000 Years. (editor and author of one chapter entitled Before the Visitors). Lorimer Press, 2008. 128p.
- The Archaeology of Bruce G. Trigger: Theoretical Empiricism. (Co-edited with Michael Bisson and co-author of Foreword and Introductory chapter), McGill-Queens University Press. 2006. Montreal, 291p.
- Bones of the Ancestors: The Archaeology and Osteobiography of the Moatfield Ossuary. (Co-edited with Susan Pfeiffer and co-author of five chapters), Mercury Series Paper No. 163, Canadian Museum of Civilization. 2003. 351p and CD ROM.
- Government on Fire: The History and Archaeology of Upper Canada's First Parliament Buildings. (Co-authored with Frank Dieterman) Toronto: eastendbooks, 2001. 118p.
- Taming the Taxonomy: Toward a New Understanding of Great Lakes Archaeology. (Co-edited with Chris Watts and author of the Introduction) Proceedings of the Joint Symposium of the 1997 Ontario Archaeological Society and the Midwest Archaeological Conference, North York, Ontario. Toronto: eastendbooks, 1999, 416p.
- The Archaeology of the Parsons Site: A Fifty Year Perspective. (Co-edited with David Robertson and co-author of three chapters). Ontario Archaeology, Volume 65/66, (edited volume), Toronto, 1998, 212p.
- Legacy of Stone: Ancient Life on the Niagara Frontier. (Co-authored with Robert I. MacDonald). Toronto: eastendbooks, 1998. 168p. Second Printing, 2000.
- The Myers Road Site (AiHb-13): A Prehistoric Iroquoian Village, Cambridge, Ontario, (editor and co-authored four chapters). Occasional Publication of the London Chapter, Ontario Archaeological Society, Number 7, London, 1998. 216p.
- Death at Snake Hill: The History and Archaeology of a War of 1812 Cemetery (with Paul Litt and Joseph Whitehorne). Toronto: Dundurn Press, 1993. 158p.
- Snake Hill: An Investigation of a Military Cemetery from the War of 1812 (co-edited with Susan Pfeiffer; authored Introduction and co-authored two additional chapters). Toronto: Dundurn Press, 1991. 443p.

== Major projects ==
- City of Toronto Archaeological Master Plan
- City of Toronto Central Waterfront
- The Don Jail Site (see: Hangman's Graveyard)
- Elmbank Cemetery
- The First Parliament Site
- Bishop's Block
- Fort York National Historic Site (See: Explosion 1812 Battle of York)
- Highway 407 Extension Project
- The Mantle Site (See: Curse of the Axe)
- The New Fort Site
- The Peace Bridge Site
- The Snake Hill Site
- South Kent Wind Project
- Toronto General Hospital (See: Death or Canada)
