= Hangman's Graveyard =

- Written by: Mick Grogan; Craig Thompson
- Directed by: Mick Grogan
- Narrated by: Brian O'Dea
- Theme music composer: Michael Vuscan
- Country of origin: Canada
- Original language: English

Production
- Producer: Daniel Thomson
- Cinematography: Michael Savoie; Decebal Dascau; Sabre Wallker
- Running time: 47 minutes

Original release
- Network: History Television
- Release: December 6, 2009

Hangman's Graveyard is a Canadian documentary film which was originally broadcast in Canada on History Television on December 6, 2009. A work-in-progress screening of the film was presented at the Ontario Archaeological Society's 36th annual symposium and as the opening film of DocFest Stratford in October 2009. The film follows an archaeological investigation at Toronto's old Don Jail beginning in September 2007. The archaeologists uncovered a cemetery behind the jail and began a process of identifying the remains. In total, 15 bodies were found, and all are thought to be remains of executed inmates. The archaeological team is led by Dr. Ronald Williamson of Archaeological Services Inc. Produced by Canada's Ballinran Productions, the company behind the Gemini and IFTA nominated documentary Death or Canada, the film follows the lives of three men found in the forgotten cemetery - George Bennett, Jan Ziolko and Frederick Davis - and examines the history of the Don Jail, capital punishment in Canada and the nation's most feared hangman, Arthur Ellis.

== Content ==
=== George Bennett ===
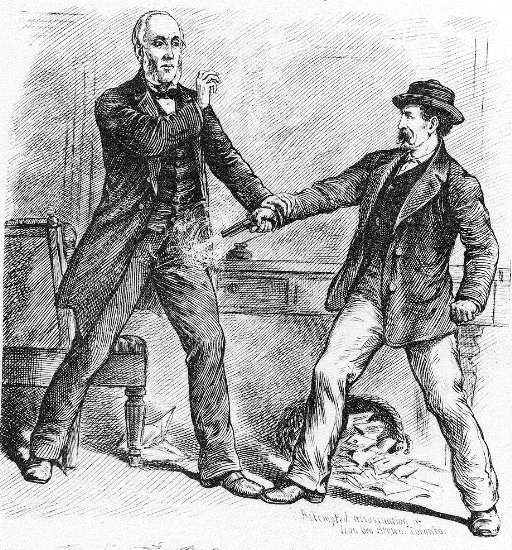
Attempted Assassination of George Brown, Toronto

George Bennett is the most notable inmate uncovered in the cemetery. Bennett was executed for the murder of George Brown, editor of The Globe newspaper and Father of Confederation. George Bennett was an employee of George Brown and worked in The Globe's engineering department. Initially Bennett was a model employee but eventually he descended into a downward spiral of drunkenness and debauchery. Bennett was ultimately fired for intemperance. In a drunken fit Bennett entered George Brown's office and demanded him to sign a letter of reference. Brown refused, Bennett insisted and a tussle ensued. Bennett was carrying a revolver in his pocket and the revolver was fired with a bullet entering George Brown's leg. Brown died several weeks later of implications from the wound. It was learnt later that Bennett was carrying a suicide note and had intended to shoot himself the very day of the murder. Bennett was convicted on June 22, 1880, and sentenced to hang on July 23, 1880. Before his execution Bennett gave a lengthy speech proclaiming his innocence to the very end.

He has gone to his death through an oversight on my part. It was a foolish thing for me to have drawn the revolver, but I was in liquor or I would have never done it. I could not control the event. I went there purely on a matter of business and my business was very simple and very plain. The result was as it was. I am prepared to die.

=== Jan Ziolko ===
Jan (John) Ziolko and his accomplice Tomas (John) Cekoski from Toronto Star article, April 13, 1915.

Jan - or John - Ziolko was a poor Polish immigrant who moved to Canada in 1914 to find a better life and support his wife and child, who remained in wartorn Poland. Like many immigrants, Ziolko lived in squalor in Toronto's infamous slum, The Ward. As New Year's Eve 1915 approached, Ziolko and an accomplice, countrymen Tomas (or John) Cekoski, murdered the Macedonian Borgio Trendo. The motive for the murder was robbery and Ziolko enticed Trendo with the promise of work to be had in the developing Toronto suburb, Moore Park. Walking along the Belt Line, an abandoned railway line, an argument broke out and Trendo was murdered, his head smashed in with a hammer. Ziolko and Cekoski were arrested following the murder. They were found with the murder weapon and $34 cash in their pockets. Both were sentenced to be hanged on April 13, 1915. While awaiting his death at Toronto's Don Jail Jan Ziolko confessed to his priest that he was the mastermind behind the robbery and murder and pleaded that Cekoski's life should be spared. Cekoski was eventually saved from the hangman's noose, and his sentence was commuted to twenty years. Jan Ziolko was executed at 8 am on the morning of April 13, 1915; his executioner was Arthur Ellis. His remains were buried in the yard outside the jail. On the morning of the execution he wrote a letter to his wife and sympathizers.

I am dying in a humiliating death, but very willingly ... I say goodbye to all my friends and to all those who expressed themselves for me. I sign myself, `Poor Sentenced-to-Death, John Ziolko.'

Jan Ziolko is portrayed by Matt Naporowski in the film.

=== Frederick Davis ===
Photo of Frederick Davis from Toronto Star article, May 9, 1922.

In the hot summer of 1920 near the shores of Lake Ontario, Davis raped and murdered Phillip Goldberg. Davis fled and nearly a year later was found serving time in Auburn State Penitentiary, New York. Davis had late stage syphilis including dementia and hallucinations. Davis was hanged despite being deemed mentally unsound by a physician.

The police circular read:

Issued September 20, 1920

"I am authorized to offer a reward of $1,000 for information leading to the arrest of the above mentioned man, who is wanted in this city on a charge of murdere [sic] on August 7 of this year (1920). Davis took a boy named Philip Goldberg to the outskirts of the city and after committing sodemy [sic] on the young lad, he cut his throat."

Description

"Description of Davis alias Davies. Nationality, U.S. : age, 43 but looks younger, 5 feet 5 inches, 115 pounds dark complexion, wears wig, has peculiar lips, one gold tooth. Was wearing dark blue suit and panama. Is a heavy drinker. This man is a machinist, toolmaker and die sinker. The above picture is the only one we could obtain of this man. Any information will be appreciated."

== Production ==
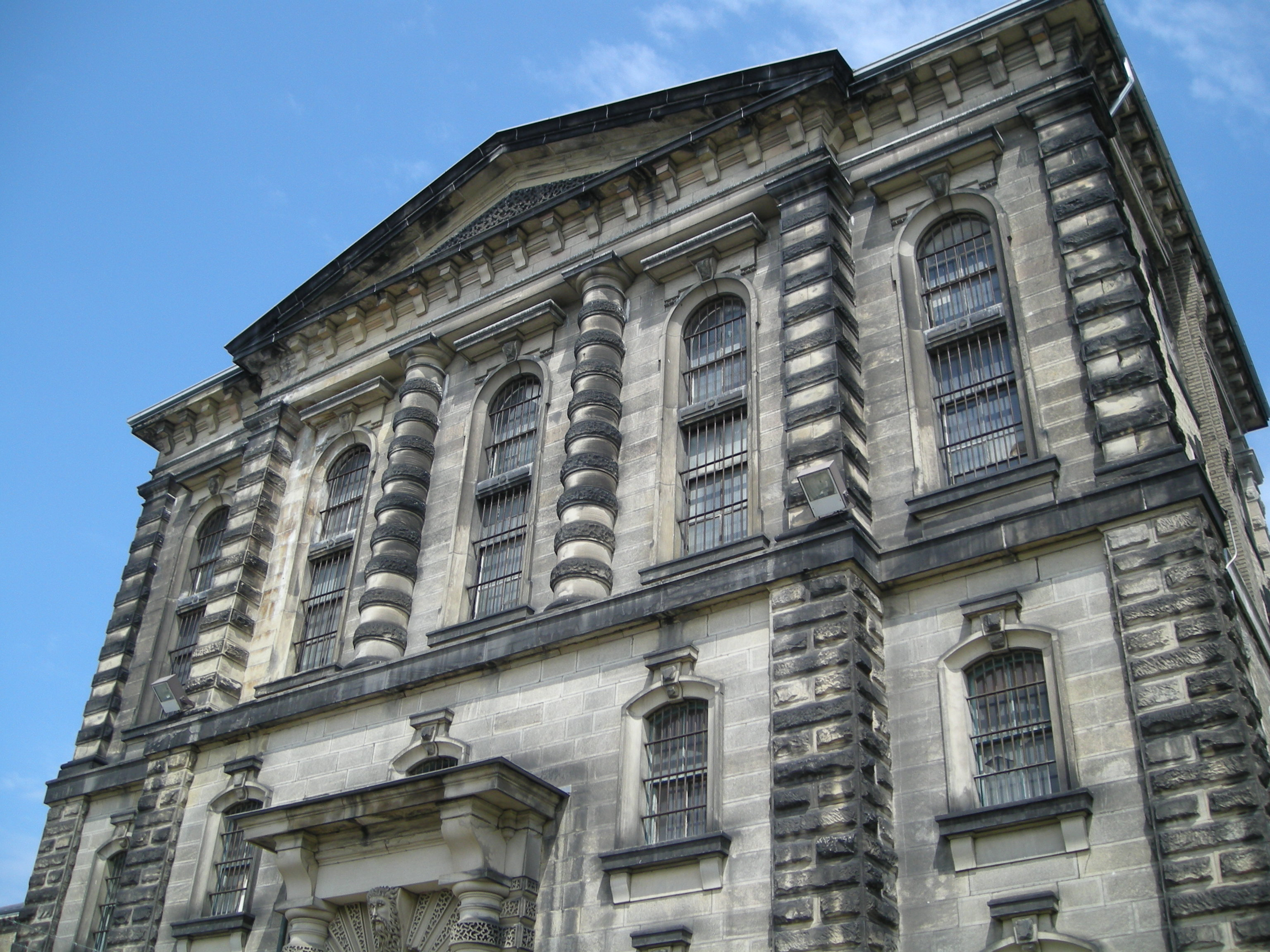
Historic Old Don Jail

Filming began in September 2007 as the filmmakers extensively followed the entire archaeological investigation, which ended with the reburial of the inmates in St. James Cemetery in Toronto. The remaining elements were filmed in the summer of 2009 and many of the dramatic scenes were filmed inside the Old Don Jail itself. The documentary is narrated by author and former drug smuggler Brian O'Dea.

== Reception ==
The film has been generally well received and enjoyed expansive media coverage prior to its release. Featured articles appeared in the Toronto Sun and Toronto Star as well as a featured report on Global News. The Globe and Mail selected it as a Critic's Pick and warned audiences to "Prepare to feel goose bumps while watching this snapshot of dark Toronto history." The Toronto Star claimed that the "Documentary `tingles the spine' with tale of 15 men executed at jail and buried there" and selected it as part of its TV tonight: Five Worth Watching series. Victoria Ahearn of the Canadian Press also selected the program as recommended viewing in her weekly Tube Talk article. Joe Warmington of the Toronto Sun wrote that the film unearths a "fascinating piece of T.O.'s past." The film's premiere screening on December 6, 2009, reached an audience of nearly 200 000 people.

=== Accolades ===
In March 2010 Hangman's Graveyard was nominated for a CSC Award (Canadian Society of Cinematographers) in the docudrama category. In May 2010 the film won a Public Communications Award from the Canadian Archaeological Association. On August 31, 2010, Producer Daniel Thomson and Researcher Nancy Carter were nominated for a Gemini Award for Best Editorial Research. On October 5, 2010 Hangman's Graveyard received an Award of Excellence from Heritage Toronto at their annual awards celebration. When handing out the award Heritage Toronto remarked that "this well-produced documentary, which aired on History Television, told a quintessential Toronto story – with the Don Jail itself being one of the most compelling 'characters'. The film unfolded like a mystery – with a mixture of history and forensic detective work – that held their attention." In January 2011 Hangman's Graveyard was officially selected to screen in competition at the 2011 edition of The Archaeology Channel's International Film and Video Festival in Eugene, Oregon.
