= Shinkichi Sakurada =

Executed Japanese-Canadian murderer and suspected serial killer

- Born: 1881; Empire of Japan
- Died: December 30, 1931 (aged 50); Oakalla Prison, British Columbia, Canada
- Status: Executed by hanging
- Conviction: Murder
- Penalty: Death

Details
- Victims: 1–20+
- Span of crimes: 1929–1931
- Country: Canada
- State: British Columbia
- Date apprehended: March 30, 1931

Shinkichi Sakurada (1881 – December 12, 1931) was a Japanese-Canadian murderer and suspected serial killer who, together with two accomplices, was convicted of killing a fellow immigrant in Vancouver in 1931. While there were speculations that he might have been responsible for the murders of multiple others, Sakurada was sentenced to death and subsequently executed for his sole conviction, along with one of his accomplices.

== Murder of Nakichi Watanabe ==
On March 30, 1931, the mutilated body of 49-year-old Japanese fisherman Nakichi Watanabe was found beside some railroad tracks near a plant for the American Can Company. His body had deep slashes on the throat, head and hands; some of his money had been stolen and he had been covered with a scarf and coat that did not belong to him. According to the testimony of Jimmy Yamashita, a colleague who had worked with Watanabe at the Hastings Mill, he had seen another Japanese man standing over the corpse, with what appeared to be a hatchet in hand.

Later that same day, three men were arrested - 50-year-old Shinkichi Sakurada, 48-year-old Tadao Hitomi and Bunshiro Fugino, who operated a "private hospital" on 629 East Cordova Street. The arrests came as a result of the coat being identified as belonging to Sakurada, as well as Yamashita identifying him as the man who stood over Watanabe's body. Further inquiries revealed Watanabe and Sakurada lived in the same rooming house and that the latter had been named as a beneficiary in a $2,500 life insurance policy. However, the authorities had insufficient evidence to charge them with murder until they found a canister submerged in False Creek, which contained bloodstained clothing and a hatchet which was identified as the murder weapon.

=== Inquiry into further murders ===
In the immediate aftermath of Sakurada and his accomplices' arrests, rumors spread among the local Japanese community that the three men had operated a "murder factory". These allegations were not without merit, as over the last two years, twenty or more of Sakurada's "patients" or people associated with him had either died under suspicious circumstances; from sudden illnesses such tuberculosis and undefined stomach ailments, or had simply vanished without a trace. Among them were three members of one family; the two children of a sailor and several people who were treated at the hospital. Because of this, authorities ordered the exhumations of multiple bodies dating back to 1929, focusing on those who had life insurance policies. An inspection of the establishment led to the seizure of what authorities believed to be morphine, cocaine and other illicit drugs used by Sakurada.

In the aftermath of the arrests, the city's license department was criticized for not shutting down the hospital sooner, with their response being that since the employees could not read Japanese, they had assumed it was just a normal household.

== Trial, sentence, and execution ==
Following preliminary questioning of witnesses, Fugino was freed after he agreed to testify against Sakurada and Hitomi. Their joint trial was scheduled to begin on April 28, 1931, and both were charged with Watanabe's murder. During the proceedings, the two defendants' original interpreter, H. Oda, had to be replaced with another one due to the 'hot pace' of the proceedings. By the end of the trial, Hitomi took the stand and described in gruesome detail how he and Sakurada carried out Watanabe's murder, claiming that he had been egged on by the former to keep striking him even when the wounded man was screaming in agony.

Due to the overwhelming amount of evidence against him, Sakurada was swiftly convicted and sentenced to death. In contrast to this, Hitomi's follow-up murder trial faced some complications, mostly consisting of arguments between his counsel and the prosecutors over the admissibility of certain evidence in the trial. Nevertheless, he was found guilty and also sentenced to death.

On December 30, 1931, Sakurada and Hitomi were hanged at the Oakalla Prison in Burnaby by executioner Arthur B. English. Neither man had final words, with Sakurada spending most of the night prior to his execution praying with his spiritual adviser while Hitomi spent his time sleeping. They were the first convicts to be hanged in the prison's renovated gallows.
