= Poral Stefoff =

Executed Macedonian murderer and suspected serial killer

- Born: 1860; Ottoman Empire
- Died: December 23, 1909 (aged 48–49); Don Jail, Toronto, Ontario, Canada
- Cause of death: Execution by hanging
- Status: Executed
- Conviction: Murder
- Penalty: Death

Details
- Victims: 1–4
- Span of crimes: 1904–1909
- Country: Canada, possibly United States
- States: Ontario, possibly Indiana and New York
- Date apprehended: April 21, 1909

Poral Stefoff (1860 – December 23, 1909) was a murderer and self-confessed serial killer. Convicted and sentenced to death for the robbery-murder of his second cousin in Toronto in 1909, Stefoff confessed to three additional murders committed in the United States just hours prior to his execution, for which he was never prosecuted.

== Murder of Evan Simoff ==
On April 21, 1909, the body of a young Macedonian immigrant named Evan Simoff was found inside a boarding house on Toronto's Eastern Avenue. An autopsy determined that he had been murdered with a hatchet, likely during a robbery, as all of his money had been stolen. Later that same day, a second cousin of the murder victim, Poral Stefoff, was arrested and charged with his murder after people noticed that he had human bloodstains on his boots and clothing. After being searched, policemen also found a bloody hatchet he was carrying with him.

In October of that year, Stefoff was put on trial for Simoff's murder, with multiple witnesses being brought forward to testify against him. The most important of these was a man named Babaroff, who was brought from Macedonia to testify against Stefoff. In his testimony, which was translated into English by an interpreter, Babaroff said that he was a friend of both Simoff and Stefoff and rejected that he had ever given a $100 bill to the latter, a claim made by Stefoff when he was first put under arrest. Due to the overwhelming amount of witness testimony and physical evidence against him, Stefoff was found guilty on all counts.

Later that same day, Stefoff was sentenced to death by Justice Riddell, who gave a long address to the convict which was translated to him via his interpreter. Stefoff himself remained stoic and indifferent throughout the proceedings, only requesting that he be able to talk to his younger brother and Rev. Atlas, his spiritual adviser, before his official sentencing phase.

== Imprisonment, confessions, and execution ==
In early December, one of Stefoff's spiritual advisers, William Ames, claimed that he had found a witness who could supposedly exonerate Stefoff – that man was William Irving, a foreman for the Canadian Northern Railway who claimed the convict had gone to apply for a job at his workplace when the crime was supposedly committed. Nothing came out of his claim, and the execution was allowed to proceed.

On December 23, 1909, Stefoff was hanged at the Don Jail in Toronto. Just an hour prior to his execution, he suddenly confessed to one of his advisers, John Kolesnikoff, that he was responsible for the murders of three other men committed in the United States. While he did not give him much details about them, he claimed in 1904, while living in either Terre Haute or Bedford, Indiana, he had shot an Englishman during a dispute at the boarding house they were living in, but was shielded by fellow Macedonians when authorities came to investigate. He then fled the country and spent some time travelling across Europe, but returned after two years to escape the authorities for crimes committed in his homeland. Not long after, he killed two fellow Macedonians in Akron, New York and left their bodies in a box car, before again fleeing the country and settling in Toronto. It was supposed that if his execution was stayed or he was found not guilty, he would likely be extradited to the U.S. to face murder charges there.

Described as calm and collected for most of his time on death row, Stefoff broke down when he realized that his sentence would not be commuted. On the day of his execution, he refused a last meal and only drank a glass of water. His final reported words, spoken in his native language, were: "I'm guilty. I murdered that man.", referring to the murder of Simoff.

== See also ==
- Capital punishment in Canada

== Bibliography ==
- Dale Brawn (July 6, 2013). Practically Perfect: Killers Who Got Away with Murder ... for a While. ISBN 9781459709720.
