= Bob Lambert (executive) =

American film studio executive

Bob Lambert (c. 1957 – September 7, 2012) was an American media executive with The Walt Disney Company for more than twenty-five years. Lambert is widely credited with championing the transition to computer animation (CGI) within Disney and the larger entertainment industry.

Lambert was born and raised in Roanoke, Virginia. He received his bachelor's degree from Virginia Tech.

Lambert, who was with Walt Disney Feature Animation at the time, developed the plan to transition Disney animated film production from hand-drawn, cel animation with CGI. Along with leaders at Pixar, Lambert spearheaded the development of Disney's Computer Animation Production System (CAPS), which earned an Academy Award for Technical Achievement in 1992.

In addition to his work with Disney, Lambert founded and chaired Digital Cinema Initiatives (DCI), a consortium encompassing six major film studios. Under Lambert, DCI aided movie theaters' transition to digital exhibition, including digital cinema. DCI established industry quality guidelines for theaters for digital content and film projection.

Lambert held more than thirty patents in media technologies. He was honored as a digital industry pioneer by ShoWest, which is now known as CinemaCon. In 2013, USC Entertainment Technology Center established the annual Bob Lambert Technology Leadership Award, and Chuck Dages (former executive vice president of emerging technologies at Warner Bros.) was the first recipient.

Bob Lambert died at his home in Glendale, California, on September 7, 2012, at the age of 55. He was survived by his wife, Cheryl Murphy; his brother Paul Lambert; and nephew Nathaniel Lambert.
