= Lorna M. Hughes =

Professor of digital humanities (born 1968)

Lorna M. Hughes MAE
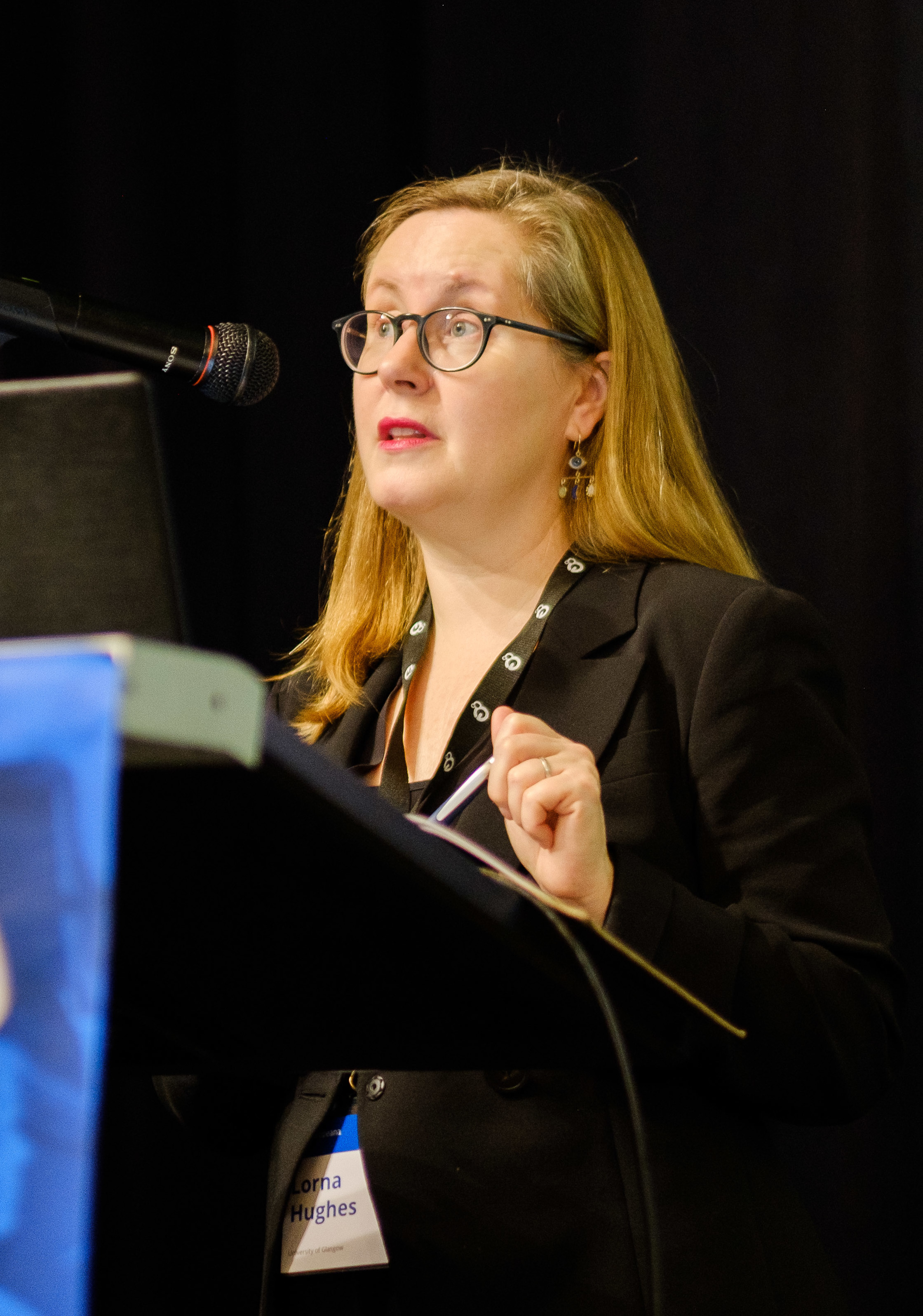
- Hughes in 2019
- Born: 1 May 1968 (age 58); England
- Education: University of Glasgow

Lorna MacLeod Hughes MAE (born 1 May 1968) is a digital humanities professor, and Professor of Digital Humanities at the University of Glasgow since 2015.

From 2016 to 2019, she oversaw the redevelopment of the Information Studies subject area (formerly known as HATII). The re-launch was marked by an international symposium at the University of Glasgow in 2017..

Hughes' research addresses the creation of digital cultural heritage and the use and re-use of digital collections in academic and public contexts, including the conceptualisation, development, implementation and categorisation of digital methods in the humanities and collaborations with scientific disciplines.

== Career ==
Hughes has worked on developing hybrid digital collections in memory institutions in the US and UK. In 2015, she was Chair in Digital Humanities at the School of Advanced Study, University of London. From 2011 to 2015, she held the University of Wales Chair in Digital Collections, based at the National Library of Wales. She has also held digital humanities posts at New York University, Oxford University, King's College London, and Arizona State University. She has made numerous media appearances, including BBC Radio 4's Today, discussing the sustainability of digital cultural heritage.{{citation needed}} Hughes was elected to the Academia Europaea (Academy of Europe) in 2020.

=== Publications ===
- Digitizing Collections: Strategic Issues for the Information Manager, published by Facet in 2004, and editor of Digital Collections: Use, Value and Impact, published by Facet in 2011.
- She is the co-editor of The Virtual Representation of the Past (with Mark Greengrass), published by Ashgate in 2008, and Cultural Heritage Infrastructures in Digital Humanities (with Agiatis Benardou, Erik Champion, and Costis Dallas. Her digital outputs include "Rhyfel Byd 1914-1918 a'r profiad Cymreig / Welsh experience of the First World War 1914-1918".
- National Library of Wales, and the digital archive and performance: "The Snows of Yesteryear: Narrating extreme weather", National Library of Wales/Aberystwyth University.

=== Collaborative research ===
In her inaugural lecture at the University of Glasgow, Hughes discussed the collaborative nature of digital humanities research and its connections across disciplines.

Hughes has participated in over twenty funded research projects as a primary or co-investigator, including The Snows of Yesteryear: Narrating Extreme Weather, the digital archive The Welsh Experience of the First World War; the EPSRC-AHRC Scottish National Heritage Partnership; the Living Legacies 1914-18 Engagement Centre, Listening and British cultures: listeners' responses to music in Britain, c. 1700-2018, and the EU DESIR project (DARIAH Digital Sustainability). With Alistair Dunning and Agiatis Benardou, Hughes established Europeana Research. Since 2015, she has been chair of the Europeana Research Advisory Board. She is also a member of the Governing Board of EuroScience where she became vice-president in 2018.

She was the Chair of the European Science Foundation (ESF) Network for Digital Methods in the Arts and Humanities, a former secretary of the Alliance of Digital Humanities Organizations (ADHO), and former president of the Association for Computers and the Humanities (ACH). Hughes has had visiting positions at the University of Graz and as a visiting scientist at the Digital Curation Unit, Athena Research Institute, Greece.

=== National Library of Wales ===
From 2011 to 2015, Hughes was Chair in Digital Collections at the University of Wales. This position, funded by the University of Wales, was based at the National Library of Wales, which included documentary heritage and material culture in Welsh collections. In parallel with her Chair based in NLW, Hughes held a fellowship at the University of Wales Centre for Advanced Welsh and Celtic Studies.

=== Cymru1914.org ===
One of the major projects Hughes developed at NLW was "Rhyfel Byd 1914-1918 a'r profiad Cymreig / Welsh experience of the First World War 1914-1918". This digital archive is an integrated collection of materials relating to the impact of the First World War on all aspects of Welsh life, from the archives and special collections of Wales. The project was funded by the Jisc e-content program as a mass digitization initiative, and launched by the Welsh Government Minister of Culture, John Griffith, in 2013. Hughes documented the development of the project as an open, co-produced digital resource via a blog and a process of participatory design, bringing digital humanities principles to the creation of a digital archive. She also worked with key communities to ensure that the archive would be reused – and therefore sustained – and that it played a key role in the Welsh First World War Centenary activities, working closely with Wales Remembers, the national program for the commemoration of the First World War. Cymru1914.org was one of the first projects announced by First Minister Carwyn Jones when he launched Wales Remembers in 2012.

The digital archive has been used extensively. Paul O'Leary at Aberystwyth University used the content to develop an Omeka-based digital exhibition on the Great War and the Valleys, exploring the impact of total war on civilians. It also enabled the artist Bedwyr Williams to create the sound and video installation Traw, commissioned as a public artwork by 14-18-NOW. The work contained images of unknown recruits and conscripts from Llandeilo and Ammanford, digitized from the D.C. Harries Collection of glass plate negatives held by the National Library of Wales. It has been used to visualize the references to Belgian Refugees in Wales from 1914 to 1918. The AHRC has also recently awarded funding to a project that will enable further linking of material in cymru1914.org with data from other archives relating to Belgian refugees.
