= Capital punishment in Canada =

Capital punishment in Canada dates to Canada's earliest history, including its period as first a French and then a British colony. From 1867 to the elimination of the death penalty for murder on July 26, 1976, 1,481 people had been sentenced to death, and 710 had been executed. Of those executed, 697 were men and 13 were women. The only method used in Canada for capital punishment of civilians after the end of the French regime was hanging. The last execution in Canada was the double hanging of Arthur Lucas and Ronald Turpin on December 11, 1962, at Toronto's Don Jail. The National Defence Act prescribed the death penalty for certain military offences until 1999, albeit no military executions had been carried out since 1946.

The death penalty was ended in practice in Canada in January 1963 and was abolished in two stages, in 1976 and 1999. Prior to 1976, the death penalty was prescribed under the Criminal Code as the punishment for murder, treason, and piracy. In addition, some service offences under the National Defence Act continued to carry a mandatory death sentence if committed traitorously, although no one had been executed for those offences since 1945. In 1976, Parliament enacted Bill C-84, abolishing the death penalty for murder, treason, and piracy. In December 1998, Parliament passed legislation to eliminate the death penalty for the military offences. The legislation came into force on September 1, 1999.

== History ==
=== New France ===
The post of executioner in New France was briefly held by André Bernard in 1645, but was not permanently occupied until 1648, when a military drummer stationed at the French garrison in Ville-Marie, New France, was sentenced to death for sodomy by the local Sulpician priests. After an intervention by the Jesuits in Quebec City, the drummer's life was spared on the condition that he accept the position of New France's first permanent executioner. As only the drummer was placed on trial, some historians have suggested that his sexual partner may have been a First Nations man who was not subject to French religious law. The drummer's real name has never been confirmed in historical records; however, in his 2006 book Répression des homosexuels au Québec et en France, historian Patrice Corriveau identified the drummer as René Huguet dit Tambour, although other historians have challenged this identification as no known historical records place a person of that name in New France any earlier than 1680.

With the role of executioner being unpopular, it was common in New France that a male criminal who had been sentenced to death could have his life spared if he agreed to take the job of executing others, while a female prisoner could have her life spared if the executioner agreed to marry her. Similar cases included Jacques Daigre, who was sentenced to death for theft in 1665 but managed to avoid being executed by agreeing to testify against and execute his associate, and Jean Corolère, who took the job in 1751 and simultaneously saved the life of fellow prisoner Françoise Laurent by marrying her.

=== British North America ===
In 1749, Peter Cartcel, a sailor aboard a ship in the Halifax harbour, stabbed Abraham Goodsides to death and wounded two other men. He was brought before a Captain's Court where he was found guilty and sentenced to death. Two days later he was hanged from the yardarm of the vessel as a deterrent to others. This is one of the earliest records of capital punishment in English-speaking Canada. It is difficult to accurately state numbers of capital punishment since there were no systematic efforts to accurately record names, dates, and locations of executions until after 1867, and many records have been lost because of fires, floods, or decay.

In 1837, Patrick Fitzpatrick was hanged in what is now Windsor, Ontario for allegedly raping a local innkeeper's underage daughter. His innocence was only discovered years later when another man, Maurice Sellers, admitted to the crime on his deathbed. This contributed to the abolition of capital punishment in Michigan across the river from Windsor.

=== Post-Confederation ===
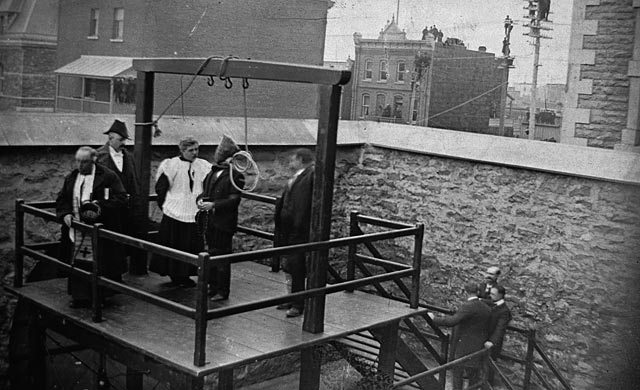
The execution of Stanislas Lacroix, March 21, 1902, Hull, Quebec. At top right, onlookers watch from telephone poles.

After Confederation, a revision of the statutes reduced the number of offences punishable by death to three: murder, rape, and treason. In 1868, Parliament also stated that the location of the execution was to be within the confines of the prison instead of public hangings. By the 1870s, the jails had begun to build the gallows 5 feet (1.5 m) from the ground with a pit underneath instead of the previous high scaffold, the platform of which was level with the prison wall.

In 1950, an attempt was made to abolish capital punishment. Ross Thatcher, at that time a Cooperative Commonwealth Federation Member of Parliament, moved Bill No. 2 in order to amend the Criminal Code to abolish the death penalty. Thatcher later withdrew it for fear of Bill No. 2 not generating positive discussion and further harming the chances of abolition. In 1956, the Joint Committee of the House and Senate recommended the retention of capital punishment as the mandatory punishment for murder, which opened the door to the possibility of abolition.

=== Limitations ===
Canada abolished the death penalty for rape in 1954, albeit nobody had been executed in a non-fatal rape case since Canadian Confederation in 1867. In 1927, William James McCathern, a 38-year-old black man, was sentenced to death for beating and raping his employer Alice McColl, a well-known and respected 81-year-old white woman, in Ontario on October 29, 1926. McCathern's death sentence was deemed too harsh by the Court of Appeal for Ontario and reduced to 20 years in prison plus 20 lashes. He was paroled in the 1930s and died on January 24, 1941, at age of 52, after being struck by a car.

McCathern's death sentence has been cited as a case of institutional racism in the judicial system. Although his guilt was not in question, his trial was held in a racist atmosphere and his sentence was seen as highly unusual, as nobody in Canada had been sentenced to death for rape since 1875. In contrast, in 1926, four white men had been spared death sentences after being convicted in the brutal gang rape of a 20-year-old white woman alongside a road in an isolated area near St. Catharines. The victim had gone for a car ride with a male friend when the four perpetrators, pretending to be police officers, stopped them under the pretense of searching the car for liquor. As one of the men stood talking to the girl's friend, the other three took the woman down the road and then took turns raping her. The judge sentenced three of the men to 15 years in prison and the fourth to 10 years in prison. The Court of Appeal for Ontario later ruled that the sentences for the three men who received 15-year sentences were too lenient and ordered that they also receive 20 lashes. In its ruling, the court stated: "It is almost impossible to imagine a worse case than that in which the four men took part." At the hearing, the defence for one of the men had asked, "Are you going to wreck the lives of these men?", to which Chief Justice Francis Robert Latchford replied, "The girl's life was pretty well wrecked." The prosecutor, who described the incident as "the most outrageous and horrible" rape case to ever occur in Ontario, said he would have asked for the death penalty had there been even "the smallest chance of having them hanged."

In July 1961, Canada adopted legislation to reclassify murder into capital and non-capital murder. A capital murder involved a planned and deliberate murder, murder during violent crimes, or the murder of a police officer or prison guard. Non-capital murder did not carry the death sentence, and juvenile offenders convicted of capital murder were to receive life sentences instead, thus officially raising the minimum execution age to 18. The last juvenile offender to be executed in Canada was Lloyd Wellington Simcoe, who was hanged on December 20, 1945, for a murder committed 17 days before his 18th birthday. The law went into effect on September 1, 1961. However, the only death sentences carried out after the reform were that of Turpin and Lucas. Turpin was hanged for murdering a police officer and Lucas was hanged for premeditated murder.

=== Abolition ===
Following the minority victory of Lester Pearson and the Liberal Party in the 1963 federal election, and through the government of Pierre Trudeau, the federal cabinet commuted all death sentences as a matter of policy. Hence, in practice the death penalty ceased to be used in Canada in 1963. On November 30, 1967, Bill C-168 was passed creating a five-year moratorium on the use of the death penalty, except for murders of police and corrections officers. On January 26, 1973, after the expiration of the five-year experiment, the Solicitor General of Canada continued the partial ban on capital punishment, which would eventually lead to the abolition of capital punishment. On July 14, 1976, Bill C-84 was passed by a narrow margin of 130:124 in a free vote, resulting in the abolition of the death penalty for murder, treason, and piracy. It was given royal assent on July 16 and came into force July 26, 1976.

Capital murder was replaced with first degree murder, which carries a mandatory life sentence without eligibility for parole until the person has served 25 years of the sentence. Non-capital murder was replaced with second degree murder, which carries a mandatory life sentence without eligibility for parole for at least 10 years and up to 25 years, at the discretion of the judge.

On June 30, 1987, a bill to restore the death penalty was defeated by the House of Commons in a 148–127 vote, in which Prime Minister Brian Mulroney, Minister of Justice Ray Hnatyshyn, and Minister of External Affairs Joe Clark opposed the bill, while Deputy Prime Minister Donald Mazankowski and a majority of Progressive Conservative MPs supported it.

Certain military offences under the National Defence Act (committed by members of the Canadian Armed Forces) continued to carry the death penalty (cowardice, desertion, unlawful surrender, and spying for the enemy), with mandatory death penalty if committed traitorously. Bill C-25 replaced those death penalties with life imprisonment, resulting in the complete legal abolition of the death penalty in Canada, effective September 1, 1999.

=== Last executions in Canada ===
The last two people executed in Canada were Ronald Turpin, 29, and Arthur Lucas, 54, convicted of separate murders, at 12:02 am on December 11, 1962, at the Don Jail in Toronto.

The last woman to be executed in Canada was Marguerite Pitre on January 9, 1953, at Bordeaux Prison in Montreal, for her role in the bombing of Canadian Pacific Air Lines Flight 108.

The last person sentenced to death was Mario Gauthier on May 14, 1976, for the murder of a prison guard in Quebec. He was reprieved when capital punishment was abolished for all Criminal Code offences on July 14 the same year.

Last executions in each province and territory
Province	Date	Inmate(s)	City/town
Alberta	November 15, 1960	Robert Raymond Cook	Fort Saskatchewan
British Columbia	April 28, 1959	Leo Anthony Mantha	Oakalla
Manitoba	June 17, 1952	Henry Malanik	Winnipeg
New Brunswick	December 11, 1957	Joseph Pierre Richard	Dalhousie
Newfoundland and Labrador	May 22, 1942	Herbert Augustus Spratt	St. John's, Dominion of Newfoundland
Northwest Territories	June 1, 1954	Fredrick Cardinal	Fort Smith
Nova Scotia	December 15, 1937	Everett Farmer	Shelburne
Nunavut	N/A	None	N/A
Ontario	December 11, 1962	Arthur Lucas and Ronald Turpin	Toronto
Prince Edward Island	August 20, 1941	Earl Lund and Fredrick Phillips	Charlottetown
Quebec	March 11, 1960	Ernest Côté	Montreal
Saskatchewan	February 20, 1946	Jack Loran	Regina
Yukon	March 10, 1916	Alexander Gogoff	Whitehorse

=== Military executions ===
During World War I, 25 Canadian soldiers were executed. Most were shot for service offences such as desertion and cowardice, but two executions were for murder. For details of these see List of Canadian soldiers executed during World War I.

During World War II, one Canadian soldier, Private Harold Pringle, was executed by firing squad for murder. Another six Canadian soldiers, including August Sangret, were executed for murder in Britain after being tried by civilian courts under English law. After World War II, four German war criminals were executed by the Royal Canadian Air Force for crimes against Canadian POWs following investigations by Canadian War Crimes Investigation Unit. On 15 April 1946, Wilhelm Jung and Johann Georg Schumacher were executed by firing squad for the murder of a Canadian prisoner. On 11 May 1946, Robert Hölzer and Walter Weigel were executed by firing squad for the murder of three Canadian prisoners. These were the last executions by firing squad by Canada.

Five German POWs convicted of the murders of other POWs were executed in Canada in 1946. Four of them were among the five executed in Canada's last mass execution on 18 December 1946. However, their trials and executions took place under Canadian civil, rather than military, law and authority.

=== Executioners ===
==== John Radclive ====
John Radclive was Canada's first professional executioner, placed on the federal payroll as a hangman by a Dominion order-in-council in 1892, on the recommendation of the justice minister Sir John Thompson. Radclive is often described as having trained under British hangman William Marwood although there is no documentary proof for this. He can be shown to have hanged at least 69 people in Canada, although his life total was likely much higher. At his death, the Toronto Telegram said he had 150 executions. He died of alcohol-related illness in Toronto on February 26, 1911, at the age of 55.

==== Arthur Ellis ====
Arthur Ellis was the pseudonym of Arthur B. English, a British man who became Canada's official hangman in 1913, after Radclive's death. Ellis worked as a hangman in Canada until the botched execution of Thomasina Sarao in Montreal in 1935, in which she was decapitated. He died in poverty in Montreal in July 1938.

The Arthur Ellis Awards—named after this pseudonym—is an annual literary award presented by the Crime Writers of Canada. Ellis is featured in the 2009 documentary Hangman's Graveyard.

==== Camille Branchaud ====
The executioner who worked as Camille Branchaud, a pseudonym, succeeded Ellis. Branchaud was on the Quebec government payroll as a hangman, and executed people elsewhere in the country on a piecework basis. The hangman was traditionally based in Montreal, where between 1912 and 1960 the gallows at Bordeaux Prison saw more executions (85) take place than any other correctional facility in Canada.

Branchaud carried out many executions (for which he was not paid) in the postwar period in Canada, such as the double hanging of Leonard Jackson and Steven Suchan of the Boyd Gang at the Don Jail in 1952, and Robert Raymond Cook's execution in Fort Saskatchewan, Alberta, in 1960.

== Methods ==
The first official method of hanging for executions in Canada was "hoisting" in which a rope would be thrown over a beam and the convicted person would then be hoisted into the air by others pulling on the rope. The slip knot would then tightly close around the neck until strangulation. A variation of this included the person with a rope around the neck to stand on a cart and then it would be pushed from under him. This led to the development of suspension in which "the drop" caused by jerking something from underneath the offender became the main component of the execution. Executioners experimented with the length of the rope for the drop. They discovered new ways of causing instant unconsciousness and quick death upon hanging. In 1872, the length of a drop extended to nearly five feet (1.5 m), which dislocated the neck perfectly. Almost one year later, the length of the drop was extended to seven feet (2.1 m).

The majority of offenders put to death by Canadian civilian authorities were executed by long-drop hanging developed in the United Kingdom by William Marwood. This method ensured that the prisoner's neck was broken instantly at the end of the drop, resulting in the prisoner dying of asphyxia while unconscious, which was considered more humane than the slow death by strangulation which often resulted from the previous short-drop method. The short drop sometimes gave a period of suffering before death finally took place.

Early in his career, John Radclive persuaded several sheriffs in Ontario and Quebec to let him use an alternative method in which the condemned person was jerked into the air. A gallows of this type was used for the execution of Robert Neil at Toronto's Don Jail on February 29, 1888:

The old plan of a "drop" was discarded for a more merciful machine, by which the prisoner is jerked up from a platform on the ground level by a weight of 280 lb [130 kg], which is suspended by an independent rope pending the execution … At the words "Forgive us our trespasses," the executioner drove his chisel against the light rope that held the ponderous iron at the other end of the noose, and in an instant the heavy weight fell with a thud, and the pinioned body was jerked into the air and hung dangling between the rough posts of the scaffold.

The hanging of Reginald Birchall in Woodstock, Ontario, in November 1890, seems to be the last time a device of this kind was used. Radclive had first been exposed to executions as a Royal Navy seaman helping with shipboard hangings of pirates in the South China Sea, and it is possible he was trying to approximate something similar to hanging a man on a ship's yardarm. After Birchall's hanging, Radclive used the traditional long drop method, as did his successors.

While hanging was a relatively humane method of execution under ideal conditions with an expert executioner, mistakes could and did happen. Condemned prisoners were decapitated by accident at Headingley Jail in Manitoba and Bordeaux Jail in Montreal, and a prisoner at the Don Jail in Toronto hit the floor of the room below and was strangled by the hangman.

Some Canadian jails—such as those in Toronto, Whitby and Ottawa, Ontario; Headingley, Manitoba; and Fort Saskatchewan, Alberta—had permanent indoor execution facilities, but more typically offenders were hanged on a scaffold built for the occasion in the jail yard.

Military prisoners sentenced to death under Canadian military law were shot by a firing squad.

== Public opinion ==
Although reintroducing the death penalty in Canada is extremely unlikely, (Note: Any attempt to reintroduce capital punishment in Canada is likely to be found unconstitutional under the Canadian Charter of Rights and Freedoms.) support for capital punishment is similar to its support in the United States, (Note: A 2023 survey found 54% of Canadians favoured reinstating capital punishment for murder convictions, with support highest amongst Conservative voters and those over age 55.) where it is carried out regularly in some states and is on the books in most states and on the federal level. While opposition to the death penalty increased in the 1990s and early 2000s, in recent years, Canadians have moved closer to the American position; in 2004, only 48 percent of Canadians favoured death for murderers compared to 62 percent in 2010. According to one poll, support for the death penalty in Canada is approximately the same as its support in the United States, at 63 percent in both countries as of 2013. A 2012 poll by the Toronto Sun found that 66 percent of Canadians favoured capital punishment, but only 41 percent would actually support its re-introduction in Canada. A 2023 poll by Research Co. found that 54 percent of Canadians are in favour of reinstating the death penalty for murder. A 2024 poll found 57 percent of Canadians support reinstating the death penalty.

Since abolition, only two parties were known to have advocated to bringing it back: the Reform Party of Canada (1988–2000) and the National Advancement Party of Canada (since 2014).

Among the reasons cited for banning capital punishment in Canada were fears about wrongful convictions, concerns about the state taking people's lives, and uncertainty about the death penalty's role as a deterrent for crime. The 1959 conviction of 14-year-old Steven Truscott, who was sentenced to death and whose conviction was later overturned, was a significant impetus toward the abolition of capital punishment. Truscott was sentenced to death for the murder of a classmate. His sentence was later commuted to a life sentence, and in 2007, he was acquitted of the charges (although the appeal court did not state that he was in fact innocent).

== Policy regarding foreign capital punishment ==
In the 1990s, Canada extradited a criminal, Charles Ng to the United States, even though he appealed to the authorities, as he did not want to potentially face execution.

The Supreme Court of Canada, in the case United States v. Burns, (2001), determined that Canada should not extradite persons to face trial in other countries for crimes punishable by death unless Canada has received an assurance that the foreign state will not apply the death penalty, essentially overruling Kindler v. Canada (Minister of Justice), (1991). This is similar to the extradition policies of other nations such as Germany, France, the Netherlands, Spain, Italy, the United Kingdom, Israel, Mexico, Colombia and Australia, which also refuse to extradite prisoners who may be condemned to death. Extradition where the death penalty is possible was ruled a violation of the European Convention of Human Rights in the case of Soering v United Kingdom outlawing the practice in member states of the Council of Europe, of which all of the European Union member states are part.

In November 2007, Canada's minority Conservative government reversed a longstanding policy of automatically requesting clemency for Canadian citizens sentenced to capital punishment. The ongoing case of Alberta-born Ronald Allen Smith, who has been on death row in the United States since 1982 after being convicted of murdering two people and who continues to seek calls for clemency from the Canadian government, prompted Canadian Public Safety Minister Stockwell Day to announce the change in policy. Day stated that each situation should be handled on a case-by-case basis. Smith's case resulted in a sharp divide between the Liberals and the Conservatives, with the Liberals passing a motion declaring that the government "should stand consistently against the death penalty, as a matter of principle, both in Canada and around the world". However, an overwhelming majority of Conservatives supported the change in policy.

In a 2011 interview given to Canadian media, Prime Minister Stephen Harper affirmed his private support for capital punishment by saying, "I personally think there are times where capital punishment is appropriate."

== See also ==
- Canadian Coalition Against the Death Penalty
- List of revoked death sentences in Canada
