= Brian O'Dea =

Canadian drug smuggler (born 1948)

- Born: September 1, 1948 (age 77); St. John's, Newfoundland
- Education: Memorial University of Newfoundland (attended)
- Occupations: Entrepreneur; Television personality Author
- Known for: Mid-1980s multinational marijuana smuggling enterprise
- Spouse(s): Eleanor "Ellie" Miller (m. 1972–1973, div.); Suzi Foreman (m. 1977–1988, div.) Susannah Lewis (m. 1993)
- Children: 3
- Relatives: John R. O'Dea (father); Fabian O'Dea (uncle)

Brian O'Dea (born September 1, 1948) is a Canadian businessman, author, television personality, and former drug smuggler. He is best-known for a large marijuana smuggling enterprise he masterminded in the mid-1980s. Set up to move marijuana in bulk from Southeast Asia to the Pacific Northwest and California, between 1986 and 1988, O'Dea's organization successfully smuggled 76 tons of marijuana worth about $300 million into Washington, transported it to California, and distributed it throughout the United States.

After suffering a cocaine-induced heart attack in 1988, O'Dea quit smuggling and using illegal drugs and became a substance abuse counselor. A long U.S. federal investigation of his marijuana smuggling operation resulted in O'Dea's arrest in 1990.

O'Dea pleaded guilty in 1991 and received a ten year sentence. After beginning his prison term in California, in 1992 he was transferred to a prison in Canada. Released on parole in 1993, O'Dea later built a career as a television commentator, narrator, and producer, in addition to authoring a memoir.

== Early life ==
O'Dea was born in St. John's, Newfoundland on 1 September 1948, one of five children born to John R. O'Dea and Madeleine "Maddy" Connolly. His family was prominent in Newfoundland business and politics; his uncle Fabian O'Dea served as lieutenant governor of Newfoundland in the 1960s. O'Dea's father was president of Newfoundland Brewery and founded Atlantic Brewing Company. He also served in Newfoundland's provincial assembly and as president of the St. John's metro board.

O'Dea attended the parochial schools of St. John's including Winterton School and Saint Bonaventure's College. According to his memoir, as an eleven year old at Saint Bonaventure's he was sexually molested by a member of the Christian Brothers who was serving on the faculty. In the fall of 1965, O'Dea began attendance at Memorial University of Newfoundland in St. John's. While in college, O'Dea worked as the host of a CJON (now CJYQ) radio call in show that dealt with current events, and sold advertising for the college radio station and newspaper, CHMR and The Muse. In addition, O'Dea also began dealing in marijuana, traveling to Toronto to buy the drug from suppliers, then returning to St. John's to resell it at a profit. His drug business expanded to include the sale and production of MDA, a precursor to MDMA (ecstasy).

== Drug dealer ==
After leaving the university without graduating, O'Dea continued to deal drugs and became an importer of marijuana to Canada from the United Kingdom. In 1972, he was arrested for possession of hashish, marijuana, and cocaine with intent to distribute. He was convicted and sentenced to nineteen months in prison. He served twelve months before being released.

After leaving prison, O'Dea traveled to Colombia to re-establish a connection with an acquaintance he had met in Montreal before going to prison. He used this relationship to establish himself as a cocaine smuggler, and developed a regular routine of picking up shipments in Colombia and carrying them into Canada, where he broke down the packages into smaller amounts for individual resale.

Following the success of his smuggling trips, O'Dea renewed the acquaintance of several individuals living in Toronto whom he had known in Newfoundland. The group agreed to have O'Dea establish a presence in Jamaica, where he could use his Colombian contacts to bring in cocaine. Other members of the organization would be responsible for transporting the cocaine from Jamaica to Canada and selling it. The relationship soon soured, and O'Dea developed new Jamaican contacts that enabled him to continue smuggling.

In 1975, O'Dea and a Chicago-based partner agreed to smuggle marijuana from Colombia by boat to the United States. When this venture proved unsuccessful, O'Dea and his partner in Chicago made an arrangement with smugglers based in Florida and Georgia to move the marijuana from Colombia by air and purchased a Douglas DC-6 transport plane for the purpose. This venture failed when mechanical failure caused O'Dea and the pilot to ditch the plane, resulting in the loss of both plane and cargo.

== Move to California ==
Having lost most of his money in the unsuccessful attempt to smuggle marijuana by airplane, in 1976, O'Dea re-established contact with a Los Angeles-based attorney he had met in Jamaica. He moved to California, where he became a courier for a group of individuals who moved money for wealthy clients. O'Dea's function was to circulate among the banks of Los Angeles exchanging cash for cashier's checks made payable to overseas companies. He would then return the checks to his employers, who would deposit them in foreign banks. He also re-established himself as a cocaine smuggler, using a small network of couriers to carry the drugs from Colombia to one of the Caribbean islands, including Saint Martin, Guadeloupe, and Martinique. O'Dea would then repackage the shipments for transport to Los Angeles and resale.

In the late 1970s, O'Dea met Bill and Chris Shaffer, wealthy brothers who had interests in both legal and illegal businesses. O'Dea began to work for Bill Shaffer, including distributing marijuana. In addition, O'Dea operated for Shaffer a crew of couriers who helped move money to overseas banks using the same method of exchanging cash for cashier's checks that O'Dea had used when working as a courier.

== Entrepreneur ==
O'Dea was periodically involved in legitimate business ventures, several of which proved successful. While living in California in the late 1970s and early 1980s, his wife and he had an antique store. His wife was a hairdresser, and O'Dea recognized the potential of Tri, the brand of haircare products she used when she cut his hair. He established a business relationship with Tri's sales manager, John Paul DeJoria, which led to O'Dea becoming the product's Canadian distributor. When DeJoria was fired, O'Dea loaned him $15,000 to help start the Paul Mitchell hair products line.

O'Dea declined DeJoria's offer to join him in the Paul Mitchell venture because he felt obligated to honor his agreement with the makers of Tri. He successfully retailed Tri in Vancouver, and planned to expand into more cities, but abandoned the venture when Canadian authorities who suspected him of involvement in illegal drugs accused him of avoiding customs duties. To avoid a prison term, he pleaded guilty and paid a $25,000 fine, and his business was closed.

O'Dea developed a cocaine addiction and spent time in a rehabilitation clinic. After his release, he resolved to stay sober and leave the drug business. With two acquaintances, he developed a plan to market as jewelry agatized dinosaur bones found in Utah. The Shaffers agreed to finance the enterprise, and it was this business O'Dea was promoting when he became involved in the large-scale marijuana smuggling venture for which he is best known.

== Southeast Asia connection ==
In 1986, a Canadian involved in selling illegal drugs who was also acquainted with O'Dea told O'Dea about the opportunity to import tons of marijuana from Southeast Asia. Lured by the possibility of large profits, the Shaffers agreed to finance the operation, and O'Dea agreed to manage it. Using a commercial vessel, they transported shiploads of marijuana from Vietnam and Thailand to the coast of Alaska. Crews working for O'Dea transferred the marijuana to their commercial fishing boats and repackaged it in fish boxes. They then sailed to their home port in Anacortes, Washington, where the fish boxes containing marijuana were moved to trucks owned by a company O'Dea controlled. The trucks transported the cargo to California for distribution and sale throughout the United States.

Between 1986 and 1988, O'Dea's Pacific Northwest enterprise successfully smuggled 76 tons of marijuana worth about $300 million. The individual who brought O'Dea into the arrangement drew attention to himself through ostentatious behavior including cocaine-fueled parties, so O'Dea removed him from the operation while promising to pay him after the marijuana was sold. This individual became an informant, and during their final shipment, O'Dea's crew succeeded in transporting the marijuana despite being under surveillance by the Drug Enforcement Administration.

== Arrest and imprisonment ==
O'Dea had relapsed into occasional drug use following his first attempt at rehabilitation. After the transport of the Pacific Northwest venture's last marijuana shipment, he fell into constant cocaine use. Following a heart attack brought on by a cocaine overdose, in 1988 he quit drugs and became a volunteer drug and alcohol addiction counselor.

While volunteering as a counselor, O'Dea became friendly with psychologist Dave Richo and made use of his entrepreneurial skills to sell Richo's book Letting the Light Through by making calls on bookstores throughout Southern California. Later, he began to record and sell copies of lectures Richo presented to adult learning students at Santa Barbara City College.

The DEA had continued investigating O'Dea's Pacific Northwest operation, and in 1990 he was arrested. He pleaded guilty in 1991 and was sentenced to ten years in prison. He served a year at Federal Correctional Institution, Terminal Island, and in 1992 was transferred to the Springhill Penitentiary in Canada.

== Later career ==
In 1993, O'Dea was paroled and he became a venture capitalist in Toronto. He attracted media attention in 2001 when he published an advertisement in the National Post through which he attempted to obtain employment by highlighting aspects of his drug smuggling endeavors, including his personnel and logistics management skills. He also began to appear on television as a commentator for U.S. and Canadian news programs, frequently providing his views on marijuana legalization, prison reform, and other topics.

As he attempted to establish himself in a post-prison career, O'Dea also began volunteering to give speeches about his life in the drug business. He appeared at schools and parent groups throughout Canada to deliver a presentation called "The Consequences of Choice" in which he used his experiences to dissuade others from following the same path. His efforts resulted in public recognition for his community service from the Royal Canadian Mounted Police.

O'Dea went on to become a television and film producer. His credits include the show Creepy Canada, which aired on the OLN and Destination America networks. In 2003, O'Dea's drug smuggling enterprise was featured on the television series Masterminds in an episode titled "A Smuggler Supreme".

In 2006, O'Dea published a memoir, HIGH: Confessions of a Pot Smuggler. HIGH was well-received, and was the winner of the 2007 Arthur Ellis Award for Best True Crime Book.

O'Dea narrated the 2009 documentary Hangman's Graveyard. In 2012, he appeared as Kevin O'Leary's advisor on the CBC Television Reality TV Show Redemption Inc. O'Dea told his story of smuggling drugs, getting caught, and changing his life in the September 27, 2012 "Trust Me" segment of the Snap Judgment radio show.

With U.S. states and Canadian provinces legalizing recreational marijuana beginning in 2012, in recent years celebrities and business people desiring to market marijuana under their brand names, including Ghostface Killah and Kurupt have turned to O'Dea to broker arrangements between them, suppliers, and retailers. In 2018, O'Dea was reported to be living in Montecito, California, where he continued to work as a broker for legal marijuana entrepreneurs and his neighbors included Oprah Winfrey and Jeff Bridges. In January 2018, O'Dea and his family narrowly escaped a mudslide that inundated his hometown. His house was spared, but those of several neighbors sustained significant damage.

In July 2021, O'Dea was a guest on the Crime & Entertainment podcast, during which he discussed his smuggling career and subsequent efforts to promote prison reform and reform of drug laws. In March 2022, he was a guest on the Black & White podcast hosted by author and diversity consultant Stephen Dorsey. During their discussion, O'Dea continued his advocacy of criminal justice reform and marijuana legalization. In the summer of 2022, O'Dea obtained financing for a film about the Russian invasion of Ukraine, and traveled to Ukraine with photographer and videographer Frank Vilaca to document events in the war zone.

== Family ==
In 1972, O'Dea married Eleanor "Ellie" Miller. They divorced in 1973, during his first prison term. While living in California in 1977, he married Suzi Foreman, with whom he had two children, daughter Cherokee and son Cheyenne. They divorced in 1988, and in 1993 O'Dea married Susannah Lewis, whom he met while living in California. They are the parents of a son, Rufus.

== Bibliography ==
- O'Dea, Brian (2006). High: Confessions of an International Drug Smuggler. Toronto, Canada: Random House Canada. ISBN 978-1-59051-331-6 – via Google Books.
