= Death or Canada =

Canadian–Irish television docudrama

- Also known as: Fleeing The Famine
- Created by: Ballinran Productions/Tile Films
- Written by: Craig Thompson
- Directed by: Ruán Magan
- Narrated by: Brian Dennehy; Ruán Magan
- Music by: Chris Dedrick
- Countries of origin: Canada, Ireland
- Original language: English
- No. of episodes: 2

Production
- Producers: Craig Thompson; Stephen Rooke; Dave Farrell; Patricia Phillips
- Cinematography: Colm Whelan
- Editor: Bruce Annis

Original release
- Network: RTÉ One (Ireland); History Television (Canada); The History Channel UK (United Kingdom)
- Release: 25 November – 2 December 2008

The screen shot used by RTÉ to describe Death or Canada

Death or Canada is a two-part Canadian–Irish docudrama which was broadcast in Ireland on RTÉ One in November/December 2008. In the UK on The History Channel UK in January and February 2009 as Fleeing The Famine. The film was also featured as part of the celebrations for Toronto's 175th anniversary.

Narrated by Brian Dennehy, the film follows the Protestant Willis family from the west of Ireland as they flee to Canada in the Spring of 1847 at the height of the Great Famine, ultimately arriving in Toronto, The story is intercut with commentary from historians and other experts.

It was directed by Ruán Magan.

The title of the film comes from the research of one of the main contributors, Mark McGowan, Principal of St. Michael's College, University of Toronto. He says that "The title, Death or Canada, was something that I discovered in archives in Limerick, Ireland, in a newspaper where the locals were writing about the choices that had to be made in 1847. They said: 'During the Cromwellian period, it was to hell or Connaught, and now that's being writ large in our own time as death or Canada.' "

== Cast ==
- Narrator:Brian Dennehy
- John Willis: Tony Murphy
- Mary Willis: Rose Conway

== Contributors ==
- Peter Gray, Queen's University Belfast
- Robert Kearns, Ireland Park Foundation
- Donald Low, Mt. Sinai Hospital Toronto
- Mark McGowan, University of Toronto
- John Waters

== Episodes ==
=== Episode one ===
Set in early 1847, it follows the doomed Willis family, who were forced to leave their home in southwest Ireland to set out on a journey to Canada. The Willis' are Protestant and demonstrate that it wasn't only Catholics who were victims of the Great Famine. Professor Peter Gray of Queen's University Belfast opines: "People think that Irish Catholics have the monopoly on famine suffering, when in fact it crossed the religious divide. 30% of those who went to Canada were Protestant."

The episode investigates the impact of the Famine on North America. In summer 1847, Toronto, then a small city in the British colony of Canada, was swamped by an influx of 40,000 famine refugees from Ireland. Toronto's Bishop Michael Power, who following a visit to Ireland in 1847, endeavoured to warn the City Council of the human tsunami of Irish that were about to arrive on its shores. The programme follows the archaeological excavations recently undertaken by Toronto-based Archaeological Services Inc., on the site of the future headquarters of the Toronto International Film Festival, to find the remains of the so-called "fever sheds" in which emaciated immigrants were treated or died. The programme ends with the Willis family arriving at the Grosse Île quarantine station outside of Quebec City at the narrowing of the Saint Lawrence River. The Willis' story is inter-cut with Robert Kearns, chairman of Toronto's Ireland Park, touring the island, which is now an Irish Memorial and National Historic Site.

=== Episode two ===
The second episode was broadcast on RTÉ One on 2 December 2008 at 22:15. It follows the epic journey and tragic story of the Willis family who travel from the West of Ireland in the hopes of starting over in Canada. The program features interviews with William Clay Ford, Jr., whose ancestors came through Toronto in 1847 en route to Dearborn, Michigan, Professor Mark McGowan of the University of Toronto, Dr Peter Grey of Queen's University, Belfast, Microbiologist Dr. Donald Low of Toronto's Mt. Sinai Hospital and with Robert Kearns. Reflections on the famine are provided by John Waters.

The Willis family continue their journey to Toronto, while the eastern ports and cities of British North America were overwhelmed by typhus-infested refugees who caused health crises wherever they went. The programme also looks at the heroes of the young city of Toronto as they absorb the famine refugees. Portrayed in the film are Dr. George Grassett, who was the Chief Medical Officer at Toronto's Fever Sheds, Toronto's Emigrant Agent, Edward McElderry, Nurse Susan Bailey, who also worked in the Fever Sheds and Bishop Michael Power who is the chief hero of Toronto's summer of sorrow in 1847 – responsible for building the fever sheds and hospital that saved thousands of the refugees – and finally dying himself from Typhus – contracted from his time in the fever sheds.

== Production ==
Death or Canada is a Canada-Ireland Treaty Co-Production, produced by Canada's Ballinran Productions, and by Ireland's Tile Films. The interviews and dramatic recreations were filmed in Canada and Ireland. Irish locations included Achill Island and Cobh in April 2008. Production shifted to Canada in May 2008 where locations included Discovery Harbour, Black Creek Pioneer Village and St. Michael's Cathedral standing in for Toronto of 1847.

Casting for the parts of the Willis Family – John, Mary and their five children – took place in Westport, County Mayo. The Canadian cast was pulled together from the Toronto area and all of the background actors are from the communities close to the filming locations. Toronto's Acme Pictures created the CGI scenes, which include the chaos at Limerick Docks in 1847, the arrival of the famine ships in Grosse Île and the dozens of steamers and barges arriving with thousands of refugees at Toronto harbour. CGI scenes were also required for the fever sheds and the Toronto hospital where the sick and dying Irish were cared for that summer. Both episodes were edited and sound mixed in Toronto. The music for the film was composed by film and television composer Christopher Dedrick and also features a performance from the St. Michael's Choir School.

== Reception ==
Death or Canada was broadcast in Ireland on RTÉ One in November/December 2008, in the UK on The History Channel UK in January and February 2009 as Fleeing The Famine, and in Canada on History Television on 16 March 2009. The film also had a limited theatrical release in Canada, and was featured as part of the celebrations for Toronto's 175 anniversary.

In Ireland it garnered a 26% share of the audience, placing second only to Desperate Housewives, and in Canada it attracted a total viewership of 370,000 during its transmission on 16 March 2009.

Bill Harris of Sun Media hailed it as an "excellent and emotional docu-drama" that "documents the exact moment when the fates of the two nations became intertwined. Neither place ever would be the same." John Doyle of The Globe and Mail said it was an "excellent docudrama" and a "profoundly disturbing...powerful story of what happened in Toronto that summer" and that it was "the true, searing story of an entire people surviving against the odds, overcoming extraordinary horror and transforming true despair into hope." Kevin Plummer of The Torontoist wrote that the film "represents an important collaboration crossing the boundaries between the academic and popular history...with producers like [Craig] Thompson, who thoughtfully integrate academic history into their projects without diluting it."

A senior executive for History Television said "We have a great sense of pride when Canadian productions and coproductions find a wide and engaged audience. Death or Canada found popular and critical acclaim in Canada and Ireland and more importantly honoured and enriched our shared history through documentary and active investigation."

== Awards ==
Death or Canada was nominated for a 2009 Irish Film and Television Award on 8 January 2009 in the Best Documentary Series category. The film was nominated for four Gemini Awards on 25 August 2009 in the following categories: Best History Documentary Program; Best Photography in a Documentary Program or Series; Best Sound in an Information/Documentary Program or Series; Best Original Music Score for a Documentary Program or Series. In 2010 it was selected as the closing film of The Archaeology Channel's International Film and Video Festival in Eugene, Oregon. The film won two awards at the festival: Honorable mention for Special Effects by jury; Honorable mention in Audience Favorite competition. In September 2010 Death or Canada was nominated for a 2010 Heritage Toronto Award in the Media category.

== Book ==
Book cover for Death or Canada

Contributor Mark McGowan, wrote a companion book Death or Canada: The Irish Famine Migration to Toronto, 1847. McGowan told the Canadian Press that, for most Canadians, the Great Famine of Ireland is a period quite remote; for some, it is completely unknown and he hopes that "while this volume focuses on just one year, in one city, its intent is to encourage further social study of the Irish experience in Canada, while putting faces and voices to the bare statistics that have come to distinguish 'Black '47' from the other phases of Irish migration." The book is published by the Canadian publishing company Novalis. In September 2010 the book Death or Canada along with the film was nominated for a 2010 Heritage Toronto Award in the Book category.
