= John Robert Radclive =

Professional Canadian executioner

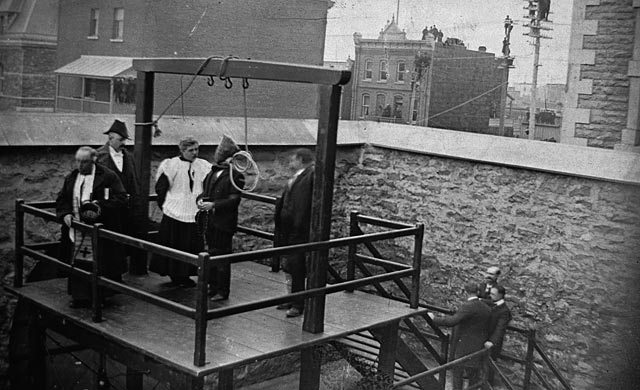
The execution of Stanislas Lacroix by Radclive on March 21, 1902, at Hull, Quebec, said to be the last public execution in Canada. Onlookers can be seen observing the gallows from surrounding rooftops and telegraph poles.

John Robert Radclive (19th century - February 1911, also known as Ratcliffe) was Canada's first professional hangman, serving from 1892 until the early 20th century.

Placed on the federal payroll as a hangman by a Dominion order-in-council in 1892, on the recommendation of the justice minister Sir John Thompson: Radclive had trained under British hangman William Marwood. He is known to have hanged at least 69 people in Canada, although his life total was probably much higher. At his death, the Toronto Telegram said he had 150 executions. He died of alcohol-related illness in Toronto on February 26, 1911, at the age of 55.

Radclive was described as a humane and genial Englishman who regarded himself as a public benefactor.

He was considered to be a competent executioner and was known for the speed of his executions.

He is considered to be one of Canada's best known executioners.

== Early life ==
Radclive spent his early life in the Royal Navy, where he hanged pirates in the South China Sea. He later apprenticed under the English executioner William Marwood, who had invented the table of height and weight that was used to determine the length of rope for a hanging. In 1890, Radclive immigrated to Toronto with his family where he passed along testimonials of his work to local sheriffs. When not serving as a hangman, Radclive worked as a steward under the alias Thomas Rately at the Sunnyside Boating Club, a rowing club in Parkdale, Toronto. However, his identity was accidentally disclosed by an inspector from the North-West Mounted Police.

== Hangman ==
Following an interview with Radclive, Hector Willoughby Charlesworth recorded in his notebook, the Candid chronicles, why Radclive became a hangman:

I once had occasion to interview Radclive on a matter unconnected with his profession and found him a very genial Englishman, who regarded himself as a public benefactor. He said: "If there 'as to be 'angin's the only merciful thing is to do 'edm right!" Asked where he learned his trade he said, "I used to be a sailor on the China seas, and we common seamen was often detailed to 'ang Chinese pirates from the yard-arm. I was sorry for the poor blighters, they used to struggle and suffer so, so I figured out 'ow to do it quick and mercifullike. When I took the Birchall job I was 'ard- up. He seemed a pleasant sort of man, and I figured that it was kinder for me to do the job than to 'ave it bungled by one of them farm 'ands up there, like lots of cases that used to 'appen. All the time he was talking he was busy packing tools and ropes; and apologized for the discourtesy, by saying that he had to catch a train to go and hang an Indian in the West. He explained his technique.

== Hangings ==
=== Cordelia Viau and Sam Parslow ===
Cordelia Viau and her paramour, Sam Parslow, were to be executed on March 9, 1899.

=== St. Scholastique hanging ===
The preparations for the hanging on an elderly man at St. Scholastique, Quebec in 1899 had gone well, when the man, while standing on the trap, already hooded, noosed, and pinioned, suddenly fell lifelessly into Radclive's arms. The presiding physician quickly determined that the man was indeed dead. A quandary thus presented itself in that the man that was to be killed had died prior to being hanged and there was no legal precedent. Although Radclive believed that justice had thus been served, the presiding local sheriff, who was the legal authority at the execution, thought otherwise. The sheriff, referring to the language of the death warrant issued under the imprimatur of His Majesty the King, which unequivocally stated "I do now direct you the said sheriff of the said county to cause execution of the said sentence to be done," argued that the man was to be hanged until dead, and the fact that the subject had expired prior to being hanged was an unanticipated contingency. Thus, the sheriff instructed that Radclive "get a chair", and subsequently the corpse was hung, with the neck snapping audibly. Radclive was deeply distraught by this display of justice that pursued the sentence of death beyond the grave and was offended by this burlesque of his profession.

Following the St. Scholastique hanging, Radclive drank heavily, consuming a bottle of brandy after every execution.

=== Port Arthur, Ontario - Oliver Prevost ===
Radclive arrived in Port Arthur, Ontario for the execution of Oliver Prevost, a convicted murderer, on March 15, 1899. This was the first hanging to take place at the Lakehead (now Thunder Bay, Ontario. A testament to Radclive's skill, Prevost was dropped through the trap door and his neck cleanly broken. When the autopsy was undertaken, it was determined that there had been no suffering on the part of the condemned and he had died instantly. So quickly had he expired, in fact, that he did not have time to drop the bible he had been holding and it was still clutched in his hands after death.

=== Hilda Blake ===
Emily Hilda Blake was the last official Canadian execution of the 19th century, executed by Radclive on December 27, 1899, at Brandon, Manitoba.

The hanging was described by Frank W. Anderson, a criminologist, in his publication A Concise History of Capital Punishment in Canada.

After pinioning her arms to her waist with two leather straps, Radclive escorted her to the scaffold with extreme gentleness. As she reached the bottom of the steps, she asked him to raise her skirt so that she could put her foot on the bottom step. Her former guardian, Mr. Stewart, tears streaming down his face, stood on the bottom step the whole time ... Hilda attempted to delay stepping on the fatal trap as long as possible, but was urged gently forward by the hangman. She smiled as Radclive strapped her feet and placed the black hood over her head. As the Lord's Prayer was said, she was seen to sway slightly, but she died with composure.

== Later life ==
Radclive also subsequently suffered from perpetration-induced traumatic stress; describing his psychological torment:

And so I pacified by conscience in that way for many years, but of late it is killing me. I suffered agony of mind that was terrible, and began to feel as if iron bars tightened around me. The remorse which comes over me is terrible and my nerves give out until I have not slept until days at a time. I used to say to condemned persons as I beckoned with my hand, "Come with me." Now at night when I lie down, I start up with a roar as victim after victim comes up before me. I can see them on the trap, waiting a second before they face their Maker. They haunt me and taunt me until am nearly crazy with uneartly fear. I am two hundred times a murderer, but I won't kill another man.

Despite serving as a hangman, he later reversed his stance on capital punishment, stating:

I had always thought capital punishment was right, but not now. I believe the Almighty will visit the Christian nations with dire calamity if they don't stop taking the lives of their fellows, no matter how heinous the crime. Murderers should be allowed to live as long as possible and work out their salvation on behalf of the State.

== Hangings ==
- March 10, 1899 at Montreal – Cordeliau Viau and her paramour Sam Parslow

Preceded by	Canadian office of hangman 1892–1911?	Succeeded by Arthur B. English (Arthur Ellis)
