= Canadian Coalition Against the Death Penalty =

Canadian nonprofit organization

- Founded: 1998, Toronto, Ontario, Canada
- Purpose: Human Rights
- Region served: Global
- Method: Activism, Lobbying, Research, Outreach
- Website: www.ccadp.org

The Canadian Coalition Against the Death Penalty (CCADP) is a not-for-profit organization which was co-founded by Tracy Lamourie and Dave Parkinson of the Greater Toronto Area. The couple formed the CCADP to speak out against the use of capital punishment around the world, to educate and encourage fellow Canadians to resist the occasional calls for a renewal of the death penalty within their own country (Canada abolished the death penalty in 1976), and to urge the Canadian government to ensure fair trials and appeals, as well as adequate legal representation, for Canadians convicted of crimes abroad. The CCADP website also quickly evolved into a space where death row inmates and their supporters could post their stories and seek contact with the outside world.

Since its creation in 1998, the CCADP has been involved in speaking with policy makers and media from around the world on the issue of capital punishment and has also helped raise awareness for death row inmates, by distributing pamphlets, managing defence funds, researching legal information on their behalf, and offering support to inmates and their families.

== History ==
=== Origins ===
Tracy Lamourie and Dave Parkinson formed the CCADP in May 1998 after researching the death penalty in the US as well as the conditions of some of the country's prisons. Already long time human rights activists, Lamourie and Parkinson were especially inspired to form the coalition after learning of the plight of death row inmate Jimmy Dennis. After further research into the state of capital punishment in the US, they also took on the cause of Canadian citizen Stan Faulder, who was convicted of murder and was awaiting execution in the state of Texas.

We searched for a group in Canada fighting against the continued use of the death penalty in the USA. We felt that it was shameful that there was no active group in Canada giving a strong voice against the death penalty, and that since Canada and the US have such close relationship, our silence, especially in light of strong European initiatives against the death penalty in the US, was allowing Canada to collude with the US in state murder.

— Tracy Lamourie, Greenwich Village Gazette, December 17, 1999

=== Campaign for Jimmy Dennis ===
Jimmy Dennis, a citizen of Philadelphia, Pennsylvania, was convicted and sentenced to death for the 1991 shooting of 17-year-old Chedell Williams. Dennis has been on death row since 1992 and as of 2008 his case is still on appeal.

The CCADP, along with other advocates around the world, have rallied around Dennis's cause. After having studied the evidence in the case against Dennis, his supporters believe that he has been wrongly accused of this crime, much of which has been outlined on a website created to promote his cause.

Criticisms of his conviction include discrepancies between eye-witness accounts and Dennis's physical appearance, the fact that the witnesses were not shown a photo line-up until several days after the crime took place, a witness against Dennis who has since recanted his testimony and that the angle of the bullet wound which suggested that the murderer was as tall as or taller than the victim (Chedell Williams was 5'10"; Jimmy Dennis is 5'4"). Dennis's supporters also point out that he lacked a motive for robbery and murder, given that he was looking forward to the birth of his daughter and was a member of an up-and-coming musical group called Sensation.

Stories about Jimmy Dennis's situation have appeared in media around the world, as well as on websites in several different languages.

=== Campaign for Stan Faulder ===
In 1977 Stan Faulder, a Canadian citizen, was convicted in the state of Texas for the beating and stabbing death of 75-year-old Inez Phillips. Faulder never denied his involvement in the crime, but his supporters argued that his rights were violated because he was never informed by state officials that he was allowed to contact Canadian consular officials. Also contrary to international law, the Canadian government had not been advised that the Canadian citizen had been sentenced to death.

The CCADP made headlines in 1998 after proposing a tourist boycott of Texas in reaction to Faulder's pending execution. The CCADP also joined an international delegation of concerned citizens, whose ranks included Rubin "Hurricane" Carter, Canadian Liberal foreign affairs minister Lloyd Axworthy and US Secretary of State Madeleine Albright, who asked then Texas Governor George W. Bush to grant a 30-day reprieve and a full clemency review of Faulder's case.

In reaction to this call-to-action, Bush was quoted by the Associated Press as saying "No one is going to threaten the governor of the state of Texas." Bush also said he saw "no new evidence that questions the jury's verdict that he is guilty of this crime," and refused to use his authority to grant a clemency review. Fauder was eventually executed in 1999.

== CCADP website ==
Along with the creation of the CCADP came the launch of their website. The site not only addresses the issues of capital punishment but also provides a space where death-row inmates and their supporters can post their stories as well as personalised items such as photos, artwork and poetry. Their site also assists inmates to remain in touch with friends and family who may not be able to accept collect telephone calls and by supplying them with stamps for written correspondence. Prisoners can also solicit for pen pals. In most states, inmates do not have Internet or email access. For many, the site is their only link to the outside world.

As of 2005 the site had hosted over 500 death row inmate pages.

The site currently (on 7 November 2017) redirects to CCADP's YouTube channel.

=== Criticisms ===
The coalition has received criticisms from grieving victims and their families as well as other death-penalty proponents who do not agree with giving assistance to those convicted of crimes worthy of the death penalty. Some of these critics include:

- Ted Hires, founder of the Justice Coalition, a victims' right group in Jacksonville, Florida, once stated that the existence of websites such as ccadp.org "inflicts cruel and unusual punishment on the victims' families."
- East Baton Rouge Assistant District Attorney John Sinquefield, who has prosecuted death penalty cases stated that he believed that the creators of ccadp.org were "just misguided individuals," and that they were "intervening in something that's not really their business." Sinquefield added: "I think they should stay in Canada. I'm sure there's plenty of criminals up there to keep them busy."
- Anthony Nunnciato of Laurel Lake, New Jersey, was quoted as saying "It's amazing that these people want to give these free Web pages to convicted murderers... I wonder if they'd feel the same way if it was their wife or their mother who had their brains blown out." Nunnciato's brother, Wilmington gun shop owner Thomas Smith, was shot to death in a 1996 robbery.

In 2005 the CCADP website was once again in the news when it was reported that the coalition had posted a web site for convicted killer Scott Peterson. During August of that year, both Lamourie and Parkinson were busy making appearances on various television and radio programmes across North America, including Catherine Crier Live on Court TV, The Abrams Report on MSNBC, and The BIG Story and Fox News Live on the Fox News Channel.

In various interviews, Lamourie and Parkinson have stated that the CCADP "doesn't concern itself with questions of guilt or innocence, only the humane treatment of people." They have also pointed out that the CCADP is not promoting the causes of all convicted felons, and that they are only concerned with those on death row. The CCADP has no web pages for people doing life, nor, for example, for any convicts in their own country (Canada) since Canada has no death penalty.

The CCADP co-founders have also stated in interviews that they understand the grief that their site might cause for victims as well as their friends and family, and that inmates who have pages posted on their site may very well be guilty of the crimes for which they were imprisoned; Lamourie was also quoted by the Associated Press as saying that she was "sorry for any added stress or pain (ccadp.org) causes victims."

=== Overturning of Arizona House Bill 2376 ===
In December 2002, with the assistance of the ACLU, the CCADP was successful in overturning legislation that prevented prisoners in Arizona from using a third party to post information on the internet about their cases on the basis that such a law infringed on the prisoners' First Amendment rights.

"They're sentenced to death, they're not sentenced to silence," said CCADP co-founder Tracy Lamourie.

== See also ==
- Capital punishment debate
- Use of capital punishment by nation
- Wrongful execution
