= Ronald Turpin =

Criminal executed in Canada (1933–1962)

Ronald Arthur Turpin
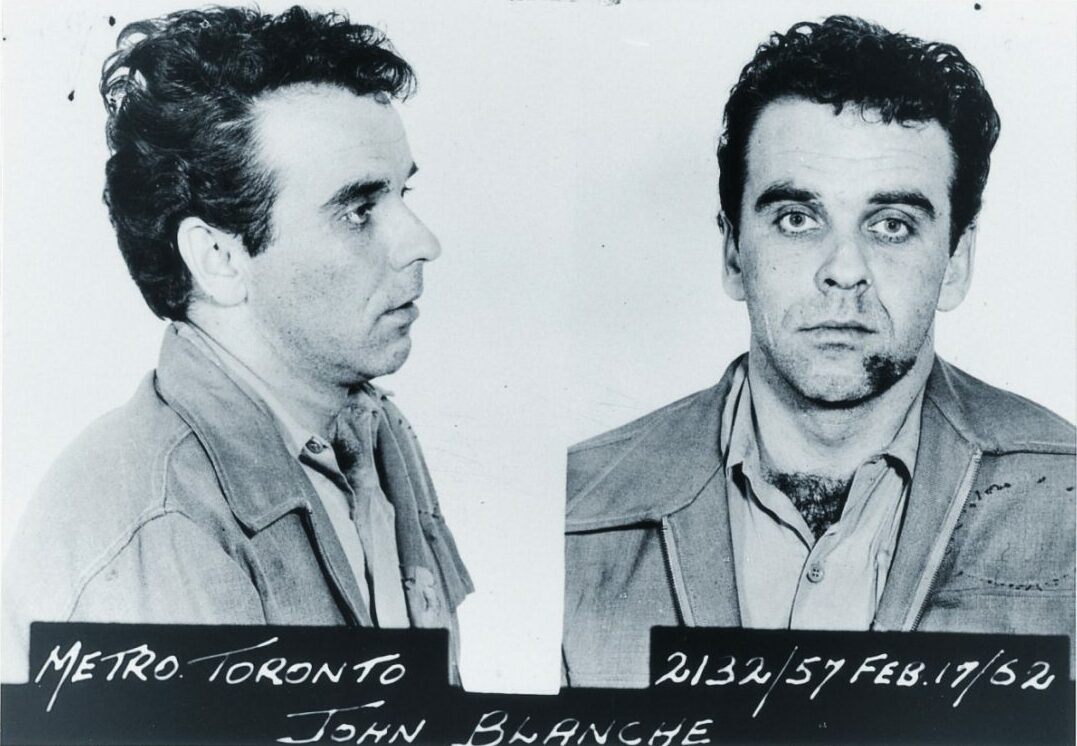
- Turpin in 1962
- Born: 29 April 1933; Ottawa, Ontario, Canada
- Died: 11 December 1962 (aged 29); Don Jail, Ontario, Canada
- Status: Executed by hanging
- Motive: To avoid arrest
- Convictions: Capital murder Auto theft Mail theft Escaping lawful custody (3 counts)
- Penalty: Death

Details
- Victims: Lorne Gibson (suspected); Frederick Nash, 31
- Date: 26 October 1960 (suspected); 12 February 1962
- Country: Canada
- Location: Toronto, Ontario

Ronald Arthur Turpin (29 April 1933 – 11 December 1962) was one of the last two people to be executed in Canada. Turpin had been convicted of the February 1962 murder of Metropolitan Toronto police officer Frederick "Jack" Nash, 31.

== Early life ==
Turpin was born Donald Arthur Neumann in Ottawa, Ontario, Canada, on 29 April 1933. His parents were separated at the time of his birth, and were divorced by 1935. His mother's second marriage was to Emil Turpin, from whom he took his last name; as a teenager, he began calling himself Ronald instead of his given name Donald, for reasons unknown.

From an early age, Turpin was often placed in the care of various relatives by his alcoholic mother, and was sexually abused by several of them. He was placed in foster homes by the age of 11, from which he routinely ran away. As a teenager, he was sent to a reformatory school after a string of petty thefts. At sixteen years of age in 1949, he was convicted in Ottawa of shopbreaking with intent, and theft. By the time of his mid-twenties, living in various locales in southern Ontario and the northern United States, Turpin had served jail sentences for auto theft (eighteen months); for mail theft at FCI Danbury and USP Lewisburg (two years); and for evading lawful custody (six months).

Moving to Toronto circa 1960, Turpin worked for a time as a rental agent for furnished apartments. In 1961, he went to trial for assaulting his landlord, but was found not guilty. Also in 1961, he was identified as a person of interest in the unsolved murder of small-time local criminal Lorne Gibson (a murder which remains unsolved to this day) in October 1960, as well as a suspect in a non-fatal shooting incident that happened at the apartment of Della Burns (his sometime girlfriend) on Wellesley Street East in October 1961. Turpin spent some time in Buffalo, New York in late 1961 and early 1962 while the police visited Burns' apartment on a near-daily basis trying to find and capture Turpin. By January 1962, he had returned to Toronto. Fearful of capture by the police, he stayed with a series of friends, seldom remaining in the same place for more than a day or two.

== Murder of Frederick Nash ==
In the early morning hours of 12 February 1962, Turpin was driving a battered 1954 Pontiac sedan delivery truck, returning from an after-hours burglary of the Red Rooster restaurant on Kingston Road in Scarborough, Ontario. Toronto police officer Frederick "Jack" Nash, patrolling alone in a vehicle near the corner of Danforth Avenue and Dawes Road in Toronto's east end, pulled Turpin over for a broken taillight. After pulling him over, Nash recognized Turpin from an earlier police bulletin concerning an apartment shooting on Toronto's Wellesley Street East in October 1961. Nash then ordered Turpin out of his truck. Concealed under the front seat of Turpin's vehicle was just over $600 in cash (from the just-completed burglary) as well as a gun.

Though there was some variance in the testimony of eyewitnesses, a point of agreement was that while leaving the vehicle, Turpin grabbed his gun and the two men got into a shootout. Nash suffered a fatal gunshot wound to the abdomen. Turpin was hit twice, once in the arm and once in the face, giving him a scar on his left cheek.

Nash, a father of four, died shortly after being rushed to Toronto East General Hospital from the scene. Turpin was arrested soon after.

== Trial and aftermath ==
Before 1961, murder carried a mandatory death sentence in Canada. In July 1961, the Canadian government adopted a law establishing two degrees of murder: capital murder and non-capital murder. Capital murder carried a death sentence, while non-capital murder carried a life sentence with parole eligibility after 10 years. Turpin was charged with capital murder since the victim was a police officer.

Turpin did not deny he had shot Nash; numerous witnesses also saw the shooting and testified to that effect. His defence lawyers argued that Turpin was in fear for his life at the time of the incident, as he believed the police were trying to frame him for the Wellesley Street apartment shooting, and that Turpin had received threats on his life from police officers who would "shoot him on sight". This defence was unsuccessful, and Turpin was found guilty and sentenced to death after a 15-day trial.

The method of execution was hanging, and the sentence was carried out at the Don Jail. The other prisoner simultaneously executed was Arthur Lucas, who had been convicted of an unrelated murder. The CBC reports that when both men were informed that they would likely be the last people ever to hang in Canada, Turpin said, "Some consolation." Alternatively, the Toronto Star reports Turpin to have said in his final hours "If our dying means capital punishment in this country will be abolished for good, we will not have died in vain."

Despite the death of Nash, Toronto police authorities continued to send out one-man cruisers on overnight shifts, even though two-man cruisers were the norm in many other North American cities, and the norm in Toronto during daylight hours. Costs were cited as the reason. Police unions and other interested parties took the matter to court, citing Nash's death (among other incidents) as one of the motivating factors. Ontario courts finally ordered two-man cruisers to be used on all shifts starting in 1974.

Capital punishment for murder was officially removed from Canada's Criminal Code in 1976, although it could still be used under the National Defence Act until 1999. Despite being on the books as a potential penalty for many years after the 1962 simultaneous executions of Turpin and Lucas, these remained the final instances of capital punishment in Canadian history.
