= Arthur Lucas =

Criminal executed in Canada (1907–1962)

- Born: December 18, 1907; Cordele, Georgia, U.S.
- Died: December 11, 1962 (aged 54); Toronto, Ontario, Canada
- Status: Executed by hanging
- Motive: Witness elimination
- Convictions: Capital murder Armed robbery Mail fraud Pandering
- Penalty: Death

Details
- Victims: Therland Crater, 44; Carolyn Newman, 20
- Date: 17 November 1961
- Country: Canada
- Location: Toronto, Ontario

Arthur Lucas (December 18, 1907 – December 11, 1962), a black man originally from the U.S. state of Georgia, was one of the last two people to be executed in Canada, on December 11, 1962. Lucas had been convicted of the murder of 44-year-old Therland Crater, a drug dealer and police informant from Detroit. He is also assumed to have killed 20-year-old Carolyn Ann Newman, Crater's common-law wife, but was never tried in her death. Crater was shot four times, while Newman was nearly decapitated. The murders took place at a hotel in Toronto on 17 November 1961.

A ring belonging to Lucas was found in a pool of Newman's blood. When Lucas was arrested, he was found to have recently cut his nails, and blood was found underneath one of them. He also had gunpowder embedded in his hand. There were bloodstains found in the car used by Lucas to travel to Toronto, which matched that of Crater and Newman. The car in question was found to have been owned by the individual against whom Crater was supposed to testify: a drug dealer named Saunders.

Before 1961, murder carried a mandatory death sentence in Canada. In July of that year, the Canadian government adopted a law establishing two degrees of murder: capital murder and non-capital murder. Capital murder carried a death sentence, while non-capital murder carried a life sentence with parole eligibility after 10 years. Lucas was charged with capital murder since the crime was premeditated.

A 1963 investigation by Canadian journalist Betty Lee expressed doubt over Lucas's guilt. Lee conceded that Lucas, a career criminal with prior convictions for armed robbery, mail fraud, and pimping, was an unsavory figure. However, she said Lucas had no blood on his clothes and that the case against him had relied heavily on the testimony of a potentially unreliable witness, Morris Thomas, a drug addict and convicted drug dealer. The defense also argued that the prior actions of Lucas, whom federal authorities in the United States had described as having "dull normal intelligence", were unfitting of that of someone charged with premeditated murder. Above all, Lucas had registered at the hotel under his own name and with his correct address.

Lucas, along with fellow prisoner Ronald Turpin (who had been convicted of an unrelated murder), was executed at the Toronto (Don) Jail by hanging, the only form of civilian capital punishment ever used in post-Confederation Canada, although the military employed execution by firing squad. In 1976, capital punishment for murder was removed from Canada's Criminal Code, but could still be used under the National Defence Act until 1998.

Chaplain Cyril Everitt attended the double hanging and in 1986, shortly before his death, he revealed that Lucas's head had been "torn right off" because the hangman had miscalculated the man's weight and that his head was hanging "by the sinews of his neck".

In an interview with the Toronto Star shortly before the 50th anniversary of the hangings, Everitt's son, Bramwell Everitt, said Lucas had made a confession to his father on the night of his execution. Lucas maintained that he was framed for the murders of Crater and Newman, but also that "he'd done many other terrible things in his so-called career that it was just catching up with him."

== See also ==
- Capital punishment in Canada
- List of botched executions
