= Oakalla Prison =

Prison farm in British Columbia, Canada 1912–1991

- Interactive map of Oakalla Prison
- Location: Burnaby, British Columbia, Canada; 49.2321°N 122.9855°W
- Security class: Maximum security
- Population: 150 (1912); ~1,000 (1950–1991)
- Opened: 1912
- Closed: 1991

The Oakalla Prison Farm (also known as the Lower Mainland Regional Correctional Centre or LMRCC) was a model prison farm on 185 acres (75 ha) of land next to Deer Lake, Burnaby, British Columbia, Canada. The Oakalla Prison Farm opened in 1912 and was initially designed to hold 150 men and women.

In 1916, the women's section officially opened, and in 1942 the woman's unit, being a whole separate facility opened on the grounds. This was renamed to the "Lakeside Correctional Centre for Women" in 1979. The original woman's unit was expanded in 1953, and consisted of two cottage style buildings.

By the 1950s, the population was well over 1000. As a working farm, the prison had its own dairy, vegetable gardens and livestock. Executions in British Columbia were primarily carried out in Oakalla, with it being the only location after 1919. with 44 prisoners hanged at Oakalla between 1919 and 1959. In 1959 the last execution in British Columbia took place at Oakalla, with former sailor Leo Mantha aged 33 being hanged.

Oakalla was also one of the locations that undertook the experiment of performing cosmetic surgery on inmates to remove deformities that made prisoners "more likely to offend". The experiment was led by Dr. Edward Lewison, and continued into the mid 1960s. Procedures were conducted on 450 inmates, voluntarily. Of the population of inmates who received surgery, the recidivism rate was 42 percent, against the 72 percent of the general population. These findings led to the rise of more programs being started around Canada and the United States. However Dr. Lewison later stated that the validity may be flawed as he did not have a control group of "disfigured inmates who had not received surgery", and also stated that the process for selection of inmates to have surgery performed on them may have been flawed. There have been studies recently showing that "good looking" people are more likely to be paid more as well as more likely to get lesser sentences for criminal acts they perform, which may give some legitimacy to the former study.

The farm portion of the prison, providing work for the inmates and food in the prison, closed in 1979 and 64 acres of land were transferred to the city of Burnaby, British Columbia. This land was included in the existing Deer Lake Park that was adjacent to the prison.

Following a riot in 1983 and a mass escape in 1987, Oakalla was closed down in 1991 and was developed into a new residential housing development and an expansion of the park. Prisoners from Oakalla were then moved to various other Correctional Facilities in British Columbia, consisting of but not limited to, Surrey Pretrial Services Centre (SPSC), Vancouver Pretrial Services Centre (VPSC), Fraser Regional (FRCC), Alouette Regional Correctional Centre (ARCC) (Later Alouette Correctional Centre for Women).

== Sexual assault ==
According to a British Columbia Supreme Court ruling, a boy was 14 years old in the late 1970s when he was sentenced to probation for a breaking and entering offence. As a probation condition, he was required to tour the Oakalla prison, where the court found he was sexually assaulted after a corrections officer directed him into a cell with five inmates.

=== Roderic David MacDougall ===
Roderic David MacDougall was an officer at Oakalla from 1976 to 1990. He was accused of sexually assaulting over 200 inmates across multiple facilities, with many incidents at Oakalla involving coercion and extortion of young prisoners. Reports started in 1980, but he continued working until resigning in 1997. In 2000, MacDougall was convicted of multiple counts of sexual assault and indecent assault. he served 3 years and 7 months in prison. His sentence drew some criticism in the public for being lenient. Civil claims have alleged provincial negligence.

== Executions conducted at the prison ==
- Shinkichi Sakurada and Tadao Hitomi - murdered a fisherman in Vancouver in 1931. Both were later hanged in that same year, and were the first convicts to be executed on the prison's renovated gallows.

== Bibliography ==
Notes

References

- Azpiri, Jon (31 Aug 2018). "How a bloody riot and massive prison break brought down Oakalla, B.C.'s most notorious jail". Global News. Corus News.
- BC Farm Museum (2018). "Oakalla Prison". BC Farm Museum.

Prison Doctor, Richmond, Dr. Guy. (1975) New Westminster, British Columbia: Nunaga Publishing. ISBN 0-919900-08-9
