= Everett Farmer =

Last person to be executed in Nova Scotia, Canada

Everett Farmer (1902 in Shelburne, Nova Scotia – December 15, 1937 in Shelburne) was the last person in Nova Scotia to be executed.

== Background ==
On the evening of August 1, 1937, Farmer shot and killed his half-brother Zachariah with a 12 gauge shotgun.The killing took place in the outskirts of Shelburne, Nova Scotia. Zachariah's wife was reportedly present at the time of the shooting.

Shortly after midnight on August 2nd, Farmer walked into town and turned himself in to police. Farmer said that the killing had been in self-defence, claiming that after a drunken argument, Zachariah had refused to leave Farmer's home, and had threatened to kill him. A post-mortem examination revealed that Zachariah's neck was broken by the force of the shot.

Since Farmer was unable to afford legal representation, and the province of Nova Scotia had no legal aid system at the time, Vincent Pottier was appointed to represent Farmer free of charge.

The trial began on September 28, 1937, with Justice William F. Carroll presiding.

At the conclusion of the trial, the jury deliberated for less than two hours before finding Farmer guilty.

On December 15, 1937, Farmer was hanged from a gallows that had been constructed in the Shelburne County Courthouse where his trial had taken place.

== Aftermath ==
George Elliot Clarke has described the case as "suspect", in terms of how the prosecution, conviction and execution of Farmer may have been influenced not only by Farmer's inability to afford proper legal representation, but by the fact that he was black.

In 2005, Farmer's case served as the basis for Louise Delisle's play The Days of Evan.
