= Heritage Toronto =

Toronto municipal government heritage agency

Heritage Toronto is an agency of the Municipal Government of Toronto that seeks to promotes public awareness, understanding, and appreciation of Toronto's cultural, architectural, archaeological, and natural heritage. It is located in St. Lawrence Hall.

== Governance ==
Heritage Toronto was established as the Toronto Historical Board by the former Toronto City Council in 1960. In 1999, the name was changed to Heritage Toronto.

Heritage Toronto is governed by a board of 23 members, appointed by City Council. The Board is made up of 21 public members, including one member from the Aboriginal community, one City Council member, and the Mayor or Council member-designate. The Board elects the Chair and Vice-chair among its own members.

== Programming ==
=== Tours ===
From late Spring through October, Heritage Toronto offers walking, bicycle and bus tours around the city. These tours travel over hundreds of kilometers and explore parks, well-known landmarks, and historical neighborhoods through Toronto. Tours are driven by volunteers, community partners, and an annual cohort of Emerging Historians.

=== Historical Plaques ===
Seeking to educate and enlighten the public about Toronto's past, Heritage Toronto's Historical Plaques tell stories of people, places, or events that monumental to Toronto's history. Anyone may apply for a Heritage Toronto plaque so long as the applicant can secure funding for the plaque. They also sell plaques for Century Houses - homes that are over 100 years old.

=== Heritage Toronto Awards ===
Beginning in 1974, the Heritage Toronto awards have been held annually to celebrate individuals, organizations, and the projects they create. Nomination categories include the Book Award, for first edition non-fiction books related to Toronto's shared past and peoples' lived experiences; the Build Heritage Award, dedicated to heritage conservation and adaptive reuse on historical property or architecture; and the Public History Award, awarded to projects that promote Toronto's history. Previous winners of the Public History Award have included documentary films, digital exhibitions, public art, and walking tours.

=== Equity Heritage Initiative ===
In 2025, Heritage Toronto launched the Equity Heritage Initiative, which seeks to provide mentorship and paid work to emerging historians from under-represented communities, as well as supporting new programming and community partnerships.

=== Lectures ===
Year	Lecturer	Lecture Title
1996	Robert Fulford	The Invention of Toronto – A City Defined by its Artists
1997	John Ralston Saul	Toronto and the Idea of the Public Good
1998	Ursula Franklin	Citizen Politics: Advocacy in the Urban Habitat
1999	George Baird	Needed: An Urban Vision for Toronto, Again
2000	Robert Fung & Michael Kirkland	Our Last Best Chance: Realizing a Century Old Dream
2001	N/A	No lecture this year
2002	David Crombie	The Idea of Toronto
2003	Sean Conway	Toronto as a Capital: Fence Posts and Fingerprints, the Growth of our Democracy
2004	Adrienne Clarkson	Green Thoughts in a Green Shade: The Making of a Good City
2005	John Honderich	Creative Toronto: Isn't It About Time?
2006	Bruce Kuwabara	Toronto's Cultural Renascence: Revival or Survival
2007	David Mirvish	The Night of Nights: The History of Theatre in Toronto
2008	John Campbell	A Shore Thing: The Future of Toronto's Waterfront
2009	Albert Schultz	The Great Toronto Roast
2010	Peter Oundjian	"Notes" on Toronto
2011	Cameron Bailey	Toronto in Focus: A City of Festivals
2012	Chief Bryan Laforme	A Layered City
2013	Gail Dexter Lord	Building Heritage With Innovation
2014	Jack Diamond	Toronto 1974-2014: A Challenge from the Field
2015	Rahul K. Bhardwaj	On Being Nice: Turning Compassion into Our Competitive Advantage
2016	Steven High	Our Industrial Heritage

=== Special projects ===
==== Sounds Like Toronto ====
Sounds Like Toronto was an online exhibit launched in 2021, and was largest digital project by Heritage Toronto. It consisted of 35 stories featuring artists and venues that epitomized Toronto's music history, and combined exclusive audio and video interviews, 3D objects, and interactive tours, hoping to impart a better understanding of the city's shared music heritage and the broader social issues that have defined Canadian cultural history.

==== State of Heritage Report ====
Released every four years to coincide with Toronto municipal elections, the State of Heritage Report provides a picture of the current state of heritage in Toronto, lays out goals for strengthening the heritage sector and provides recommendations to the Mayor, City Council, senior staff and decision makers to improve heritage management. Prior to the release of the State of Heritage Report, Heritage Toronto hosts the Heritage Matters Mayoral Candidates Debate.
