= Don Jail =

Jail in Toronto, Canada (1864–2013)

Coordinates: 43.66618°N 79.353972°W

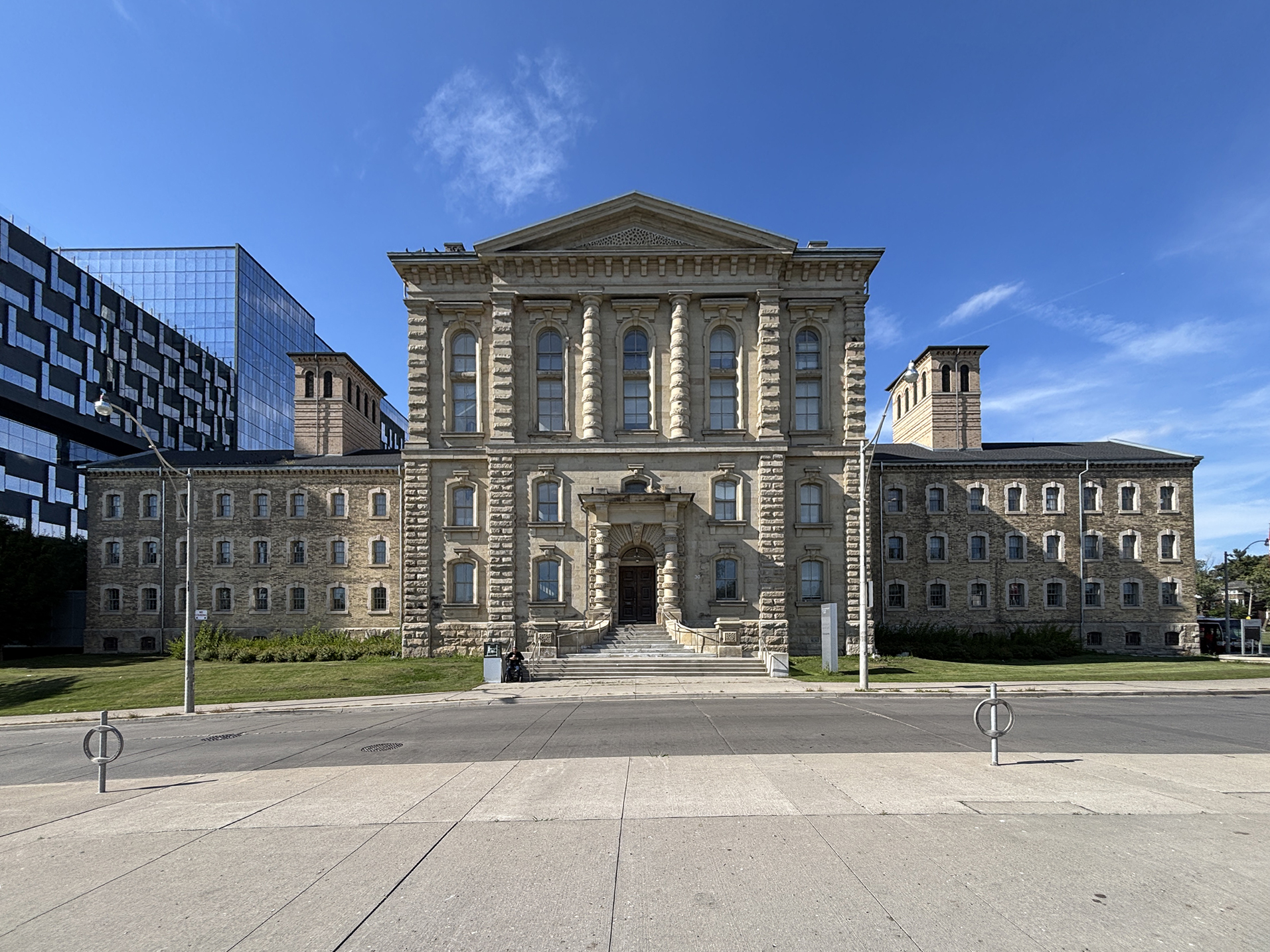
- The restored facade of the Don Jail building in 2025
- Interactive map of Don Jail
- Location: Toronto, Ontario, Canada
- Status: Closed
- Security class: Short Term (Remand)
- Capacity: 550
- Opened: 1864 (original jail); 1958 (east wing)
- Closed: 1977 (original jail); 2013 (east wing)
- Governor: George L. Allen (1864–1872)

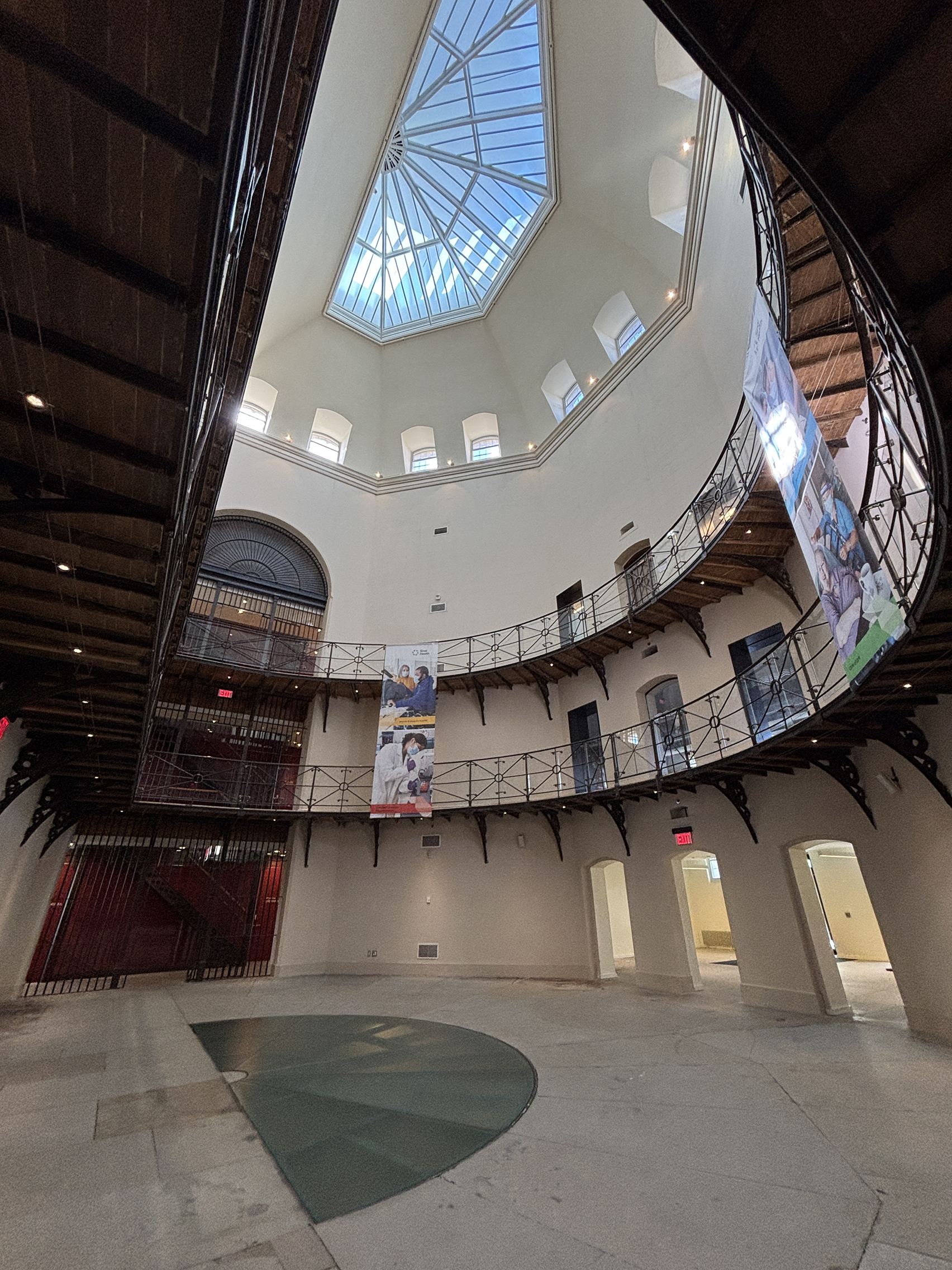
Rotunda of the jail

The Don Jail was a jail in Toronto, Ontario, Canada, located to the east of the Don River, on Gerrard Street East in the Riverdale neighbourhood. The original building was completed in 1864 and was reopened in 2013 to serve as the administrative wing of Bridgepoint Active Healthcare, a rehabilitation hospital located adjacent to the jail. Prior to its adaptive reuse as part of a healthcare facility, the building was used as a provincial jail for remanded offenders and was officially known as the Toronto Jail. The jail originally had a capacity of 184 inmates, and it was separated into an east wing for the men and a west wing for the women.

== History ==
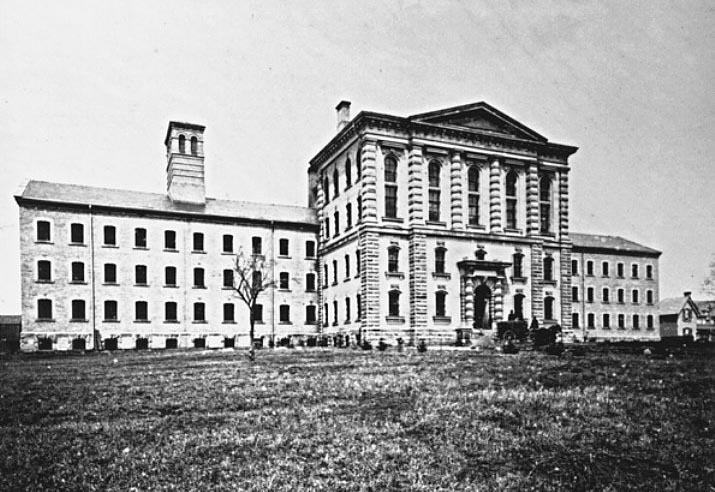
The Don Jail shortly after completion in the 1860s

The 'Don Gaol' was built between 1858 and 1864, with a new wing being built in the 1950s. Designed by architect William Thomas in 1852, it was constructed with a distinctive facade in the Italianate style, with a pedimented central pavilion and vermiculated columns flanking the main entrance portico. It is one of the oldest pre-Confederation structures that remains intact in Toronto.

The Don Jail is the only jail to have been officially designated the Toronto Jail, yet has rarely been referred to as such outside official circles, with the facility more commonly known as the Don Jail or 'The Don'. The first King Street Gaol, the second King Street Gaol and the Toronto Central Prison were all colloquially known as the Toronto Jail, and the Don Jail likely earned its unofficial name to distinguish it from these other facilities.

In 1952, the jail was the subject of the first ever television news report on the CBC Television English-language network when the Boyd Gang, a notorious group of bank robbers, broke out of the facility for the second time. The news anchor was future Bonanza star Lorne Greene. In 1974, James J. Benko was the youngest bank robber to escape from the Don Jail at age 16.

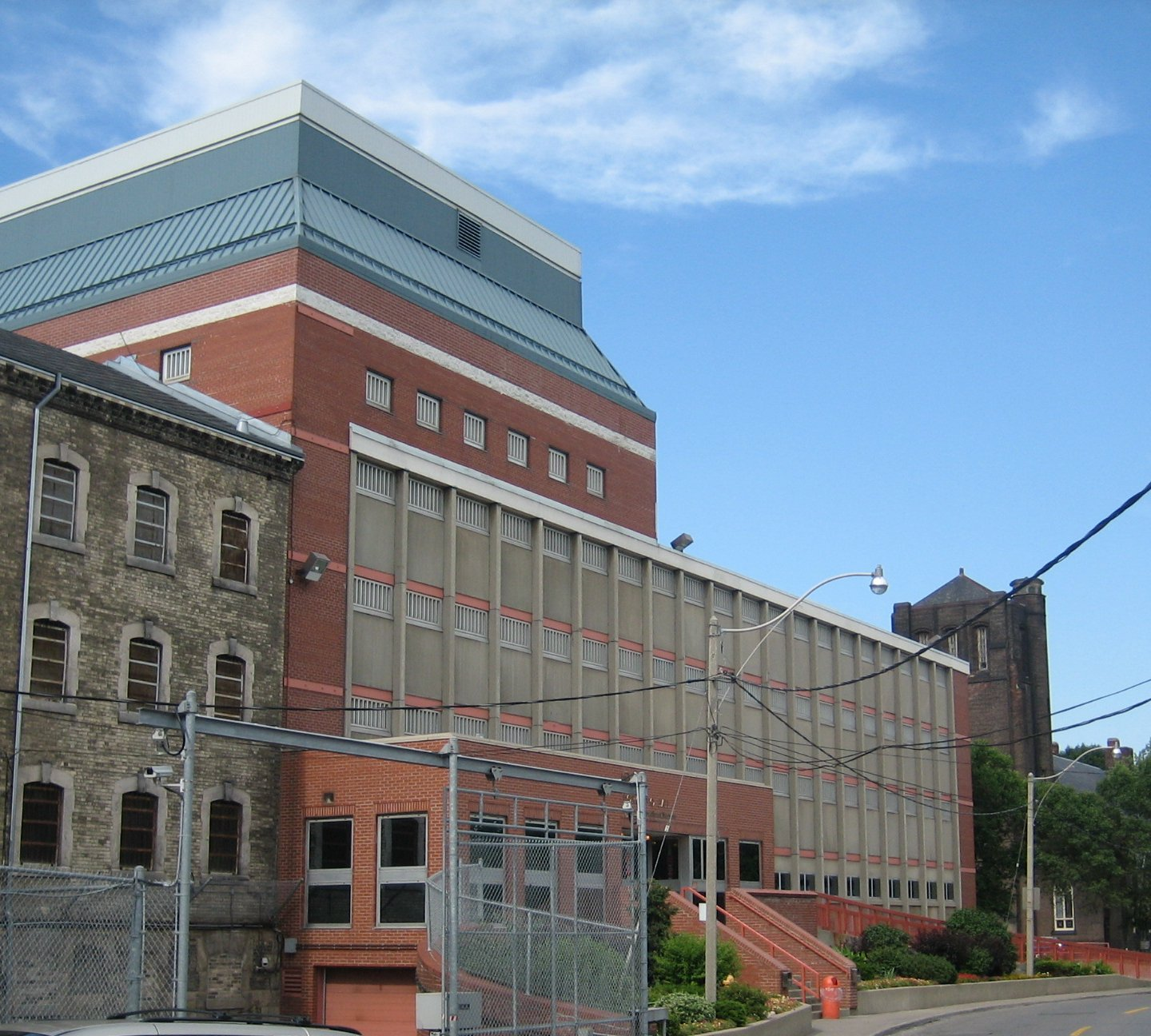
The Don Jail east wing in 2007, six years before its demolition

An adjoining, modernist east wing was built in 1958. When the original Don Jail building ceased to be used for housing offenders in 1977, the east wing remained in operation as the Toronto Jail (retaining the Don Jail moniker). The east wing continued to serve as a jail until December 31, 2013, when a new facility, the Toronto South Detention Centre, was completed on the site of the former Mimico Correctional Centre.

=== Living conditions ===
Originally designed as a reform prison, and once dubbed the "Palace for Prisoners" because of its progressive approach to the wellness and living conditions of inmates, the reputation of the Don Jail soured over the years due to overcrowding and other factors. The jail's bad reputation contributed to the closure of the historic jail building in 1977.

The east wing was constructed to house 276 prisoners, but at the end of its service its "rated capacity" was 550, and its average prisoner load was about 620. In addition, as a "short-term" jail, it was not designed with adequate visitor facilities, exercise areas, telephones, lawyer meeting rooms, showers, or even laundry facilities. However, the average stay was 30–90 days, and many prisoners were kept there for months. It was often overburdened by a large number of arrested persons awaiting arraignment.

Courts took judicial notice of the deplorable conditions at the Don Jail. In R. v. Smith [2003] O.J. No. 1782, Justice Richard Schneider set a precedent in this regard by crediting persons serving time in the facility awaiting trial with three days against their sentence for every day spent in the facility, as opposed to the "2-for-1" pre-trial custody credit typically given during criminal sentencing in Canada at the time. In R. v. Permesar [2003] O.J. No. 5420, the same judge noted that the prison failed to meet the Standard Minimum Rules for the Treatment of Prisoners set by the United Nations. These conditions were also brought to light by a controversial article appearing in the Toronto Star after journalist Linda Diebel was smuggled into the prison by Dave Levac, a sympathetic Ontario MPP. Mr. Levac faced censure by the Integrity Commissioner for bringing in the reporter, whom he led Jail officials to believe was a member of his staff, as part of his entourage.

=== Capital punishment ===
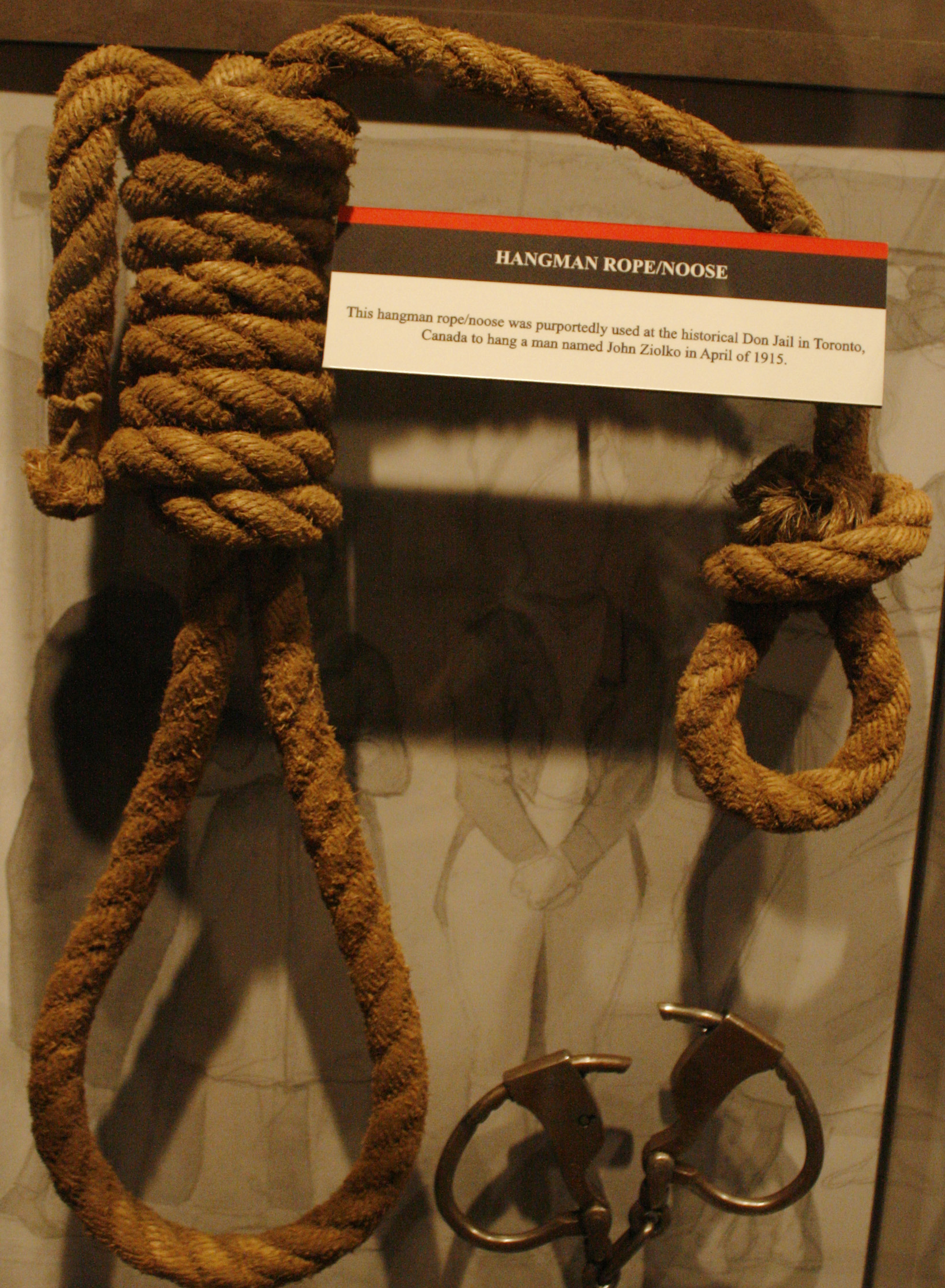
A hangman noose purportedly used in the Don Jail to hang Jan Ziolko in April 1915, as displayed at the National Museum of Crime & Punishment

Before capital punishment was abolished in Canada, the Toronto Jail was the site of a number of hangings. Starting with the execution of John Boyd in January 1908, hangings at the jail took place in an indoor chamber, which was a converted washroom, at the northeast corner of the old building. Previously, condemned men had been hanged on an outdoor scaffold in the jail yard. The indoor facility was seen as an improvement because outdoor executions were quasi-public (at the hanging of Fred Lee Rice on July 18, 1902, crowds had lined surrounding rooftops to see something of the spectacle) and because the condemned didn't have to walk as far.

The best-known Canadian hangmen, such as John Radclive, Arthur Ellis and Camille Blanchard, hanged men at the Toronto Jail. The Toronto-based hangman Samuel Edwards, who worked during the Great Depression, carried out his first execution there in July 1931.

Twenty-six men were hanged on the jail's indoor gallows. The jail saw three double hangings: Roy Hotrum and William McFadden in August 1921; Leonard Jackson and Steven Suchan in December 1952; Ronald Turpin and Arthur Lucas on 11 December 1962. Turpin and Lucas had each been convicted in separate murders, and their executions were Canada's last before capital punishment was abolished.

In 2007, human remains were found on the jail's grounds during an archaeological assessment.

=== Transformation into a hospital facility ===
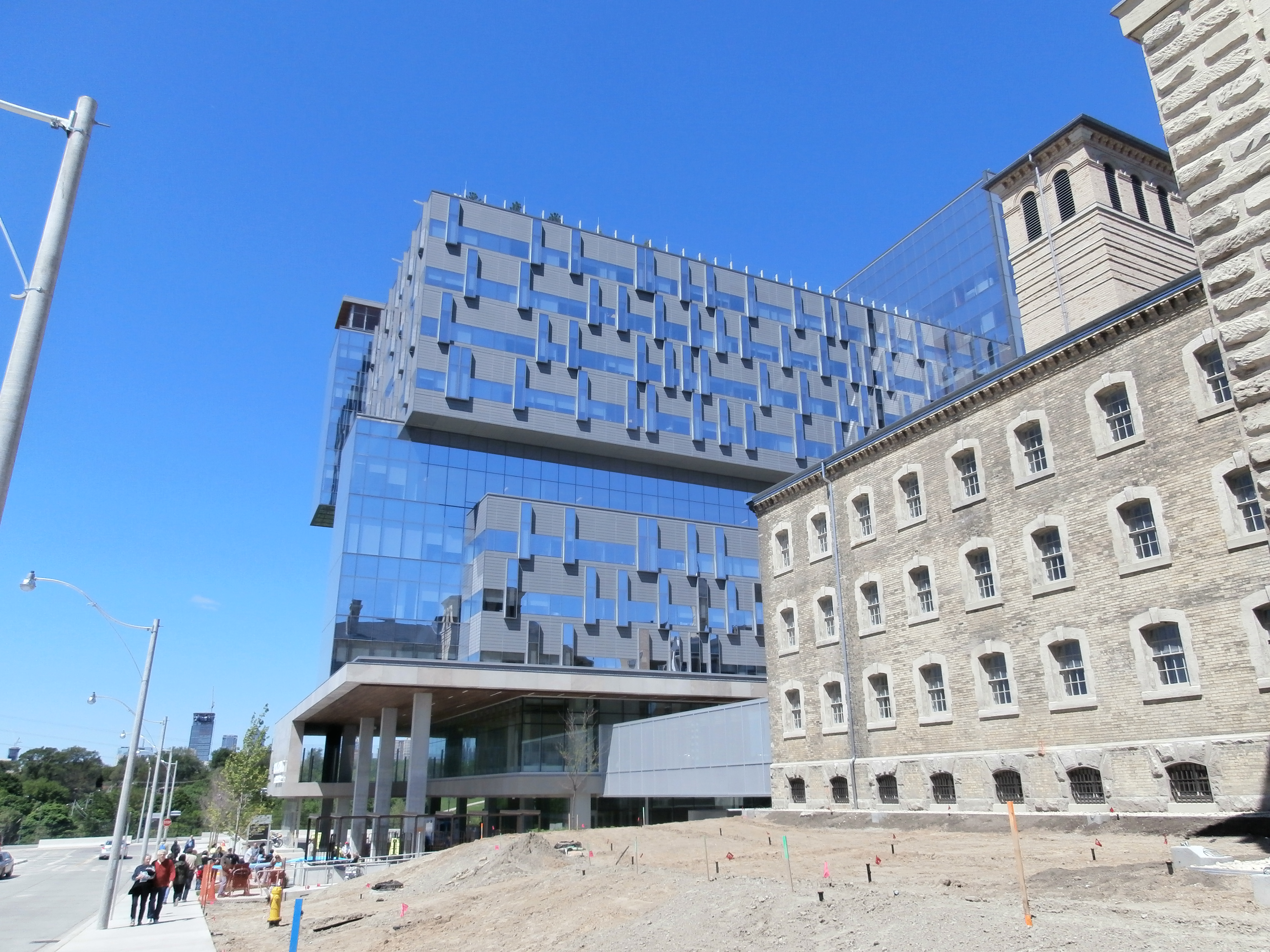
The Don Jail being renovated in 2013, with the new Bridgepoint Health hospital immediately to the west

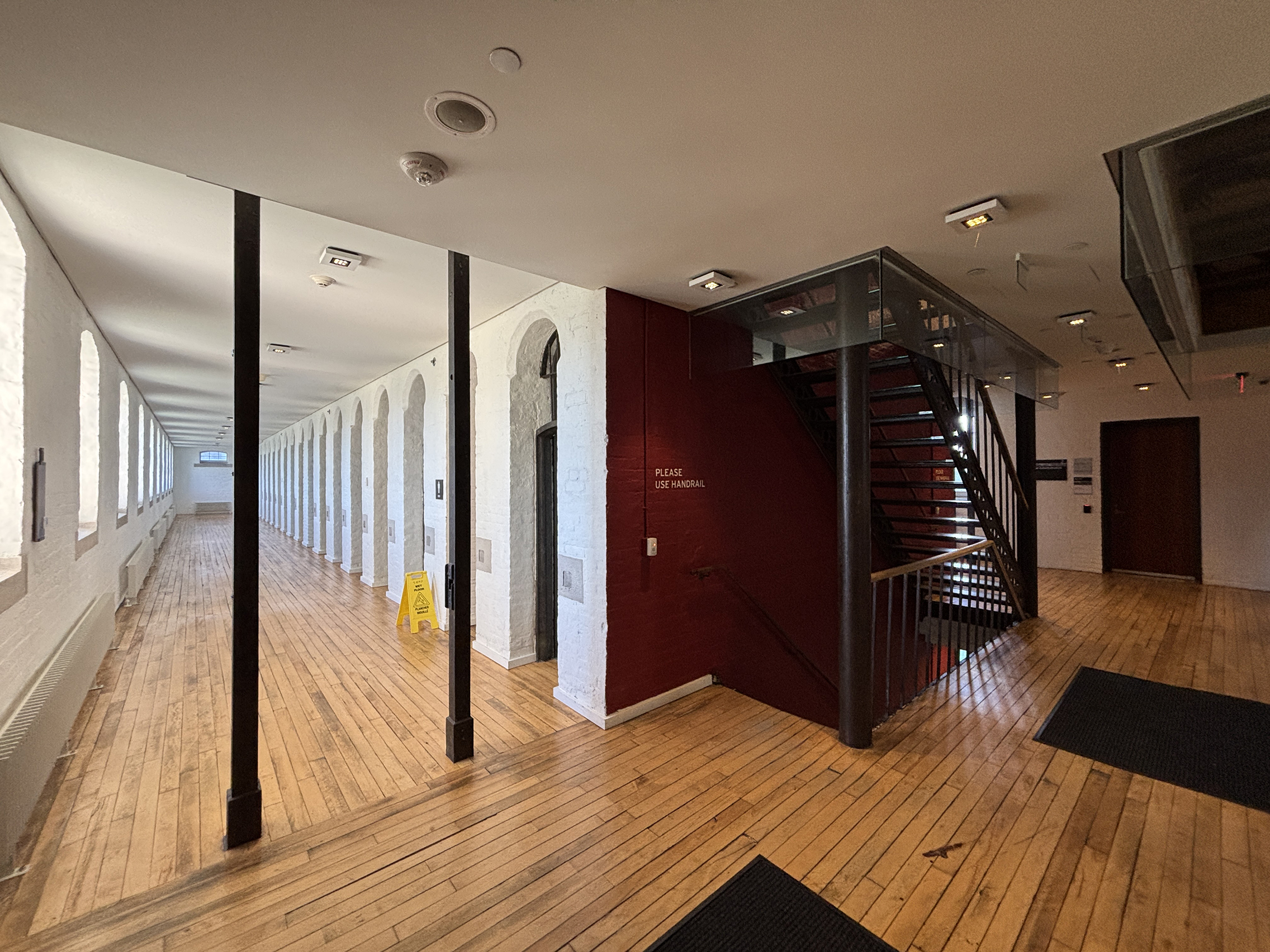
Interior space become office

The Don Jail has long shared its site with a hospital. The original House of Refuge was built in 1860 on the same property as a home for "vagrants, the dissolute, and for idiots". The House of Refuge became the Riverdale Isolation Hospital in 1875 during a smallpox epidemic, and later evolved into a hospital for those with chronic ailments and/or needing rehabilitation.

When the newly named Bridgepoint Health (now Hennick Bridgepoint Hospital) demolished the 1950s-era Riverdale Hospital building to replace it with a new 10-storey facility, the historic Don Jail building was extensively renovated to serve as the administrative wing for the hospital, a process which included the removal of "150 years worth of grime" from the exterior. About 20 per cent of the former jail's heritage interior was preserved, including the centre block's half-octagonal rotunda featuring clerestory windows, as well as original iron railings and balconies supported by griffin and serpent cast-iron brackets. The punishment and death row cells, and the former gallows tower (where an outline of the timber framing remains on the interior walls), were also preserved, to remain behind closed doors except for occasions such as Doors Open.

In 2008, the City of Toronto's heritage preservation staff and some Councillors wanted Bridgepoint Health to retain the steel bars on all of the old jail's windows. Fearing that the barred windows were incompatible with the hospital's objectives of openness and well-being, Bridgepoint Health was able to convince City Council to only require that grilles be maintained on the windows not serving patient rooms or staff offices.

The east wing was formally decommissioned on January 6, 2014, at which point it too was transferred to Bridgepoint Health and demolished in March and April of that same year. The site of the former east wing will become landscaped open space and will potentially be used for a future expansion of the hospital facilities.

The grounds of the former jail are being landscaped into a city park to be named Hubbard Park after William Peyton Hubbard. The former Don Jail Roadway has been extended and renamed Jack Layton Way after Jack Layton, the late leader of the New Democratic Party of Canada and former Member of Parliament for the area.

The prison and hospital also served as the location of the fictional Dyad institute in the Canadian TV show Orphan Black. The rotunda of the jail was also used as a set for The Cell Block bar in the movie Cocktail (1988).

== See also ==
- List of oldest buildings and structures in Toronto
- List of correctional facilities in Ontario
- Capital punishment in Canada
- Hangman's Graveyard
