= Ontario Archaeological Society =

- Founded: 1958
- Website: https://ontarioarchaeology.org

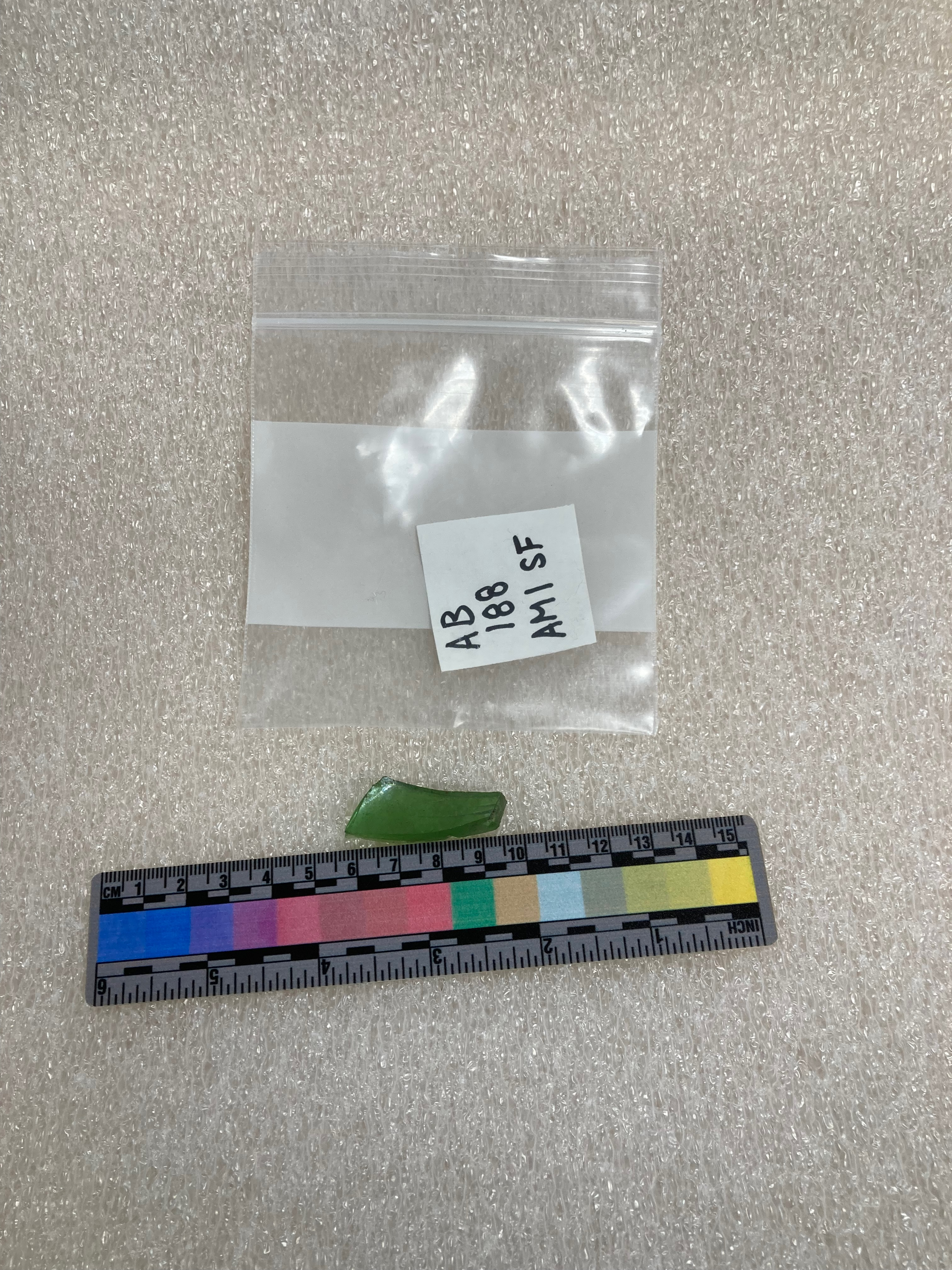
This is a shard or fragment of a glass bottle from the Auburn excavation site in Peterborough, which was a thorough excavation into the historical house from the 1820s. The Shard is an example of the type of archaeological finds that are possible to find in Ontario, and that are studied from a historical context.

The Ontario Archaeological Society is a registered charitable organization promoting the ethical practice of archaeology within the province of Ontario, Canada. It is a public and professional society formed in 1958.

The Society produces a peer-reviewed journal Ontario Archaeology. Headquarters were previously located in the Ashbridge Estate in the east end of Toronto, but are now located in London, Ontario. The Society supports regional chapters throughout province.

== History ==
The Ontario Archaeological Society was founded in 1958.

== Publications ==
The OAS publishes the peer-reviewed journal Ontario Archaeology. The journal historically published twice a year but in recent years the society has only published annually.

The journal focuses on relevant archaeological events in Ontario, and any surrounding regions. The goal of the journal is to amass Ontario archaeologically relevant material.

The journal is one of the oldest traditions and processes within the archaeological community in the province, and helping to date the founding of the Ontario Archaeological Society to 1958. It was John Norman Emerson who helped to produce the first of the Ontario Archaeology journals.

== See also ==
- History of Ontario
