= Digital exhibition =

Digital Exhibition includes both the projection technologies, such as High Definition, and delivery technologies of a film to a movie theater. Delivery technologies include disk drives, satellite relay, and fiber optics. This can save money in distribution but is usually more expensive overall due to maintenance and standardization of technology. However, there are benefits to digital exhibition, for example it requires less assembly by the exhibitor and can contain the trailers that the distributor wishes.
