= List of 1994 films based on actual events =

This is a list of films and miniseries released in 1994 that are based on actual events. All films on this list are from American production unless indicated otherwise.

== 1994 ==
- 8 Seconds (1994) – contemporary Western biographical drama film about American rodeo legend Lane Frost, focusing on his life and career as a bull riding champion
- A Burning Passion: The Margaret Mitchell Story (1994) – biographical drama television film about the early life of Pulitzer Prize-winning novelist Margaret Mitchell, who rose to fame after publishing Gone with the Wind
- A Friend to Die For (1994) – crime drama television film based on the real-life murder of Kirsten Costas, who was killed by her classmate, Bernadette Protti, in 1984
- A Soul Haunted by Painting (Chinese: 画魂) (1994) – Chinese biographical drama film loosely based on the life of Pan Yuliang, a former prostitute turned painter
- A Time to Heal (1994) – drama television film based on the true story of a young mother's painful recovery from a stroke
- Against the Wall (1994) – action drama television film based on the true story of the Attica Prison uprising of 1971
- Amelia Earhart: The Final Flight (1994) – biographical adventure television film depicting events in the life of Amelia Earhart, focusing on her final flight and disappearance in 1937, with her exploits in aviation and her marriage to publisher George P. Putnam being revealed in flashbacks
- And Then There Was One (1994) – drama television film about a true story of a family dealing with AIDS
- Andre (1994) – comedy drama film telling the true story of how a seal named Andre befriended a little girl named Toni and her family in 1962
- Armed and Innocent (1994) – drama thriller television film loosely based on actual events of an 11-year-old boy who was left home alone and killed two intruders in self defense
- The Ascent (1994) – war adventure film based on Felice Benuzzi's Italian war memoir, No Picnic on Mount Kenya, about a series of events that took place at Camp 354 near Nanyuki, Kenya
- Assault at West Point: The Court-Martial of Johnson Whittaker (1994) – thriller drama television film about Johnson Chesnut Whittaker, one of the first black cadets at West Point, and the trial that followed an assault he suffered in 1880
- The Babymaker: The Dr. Cecil Jacobson Story (1994) – drama television film based on the true story of Cecil Jacobson, who used his own sperm to impregnate patients, without informing them
- Backbeat (1994) – British-German biographical drama film following The Beatles through their pre-fame Hamburg days when Stuart Sutcliffe, the band's bassist, meets German photographer Astrid Kirchherr.
- Bandit Queen (Hindi: दस्यु रानी) (1994) – Indian Hindi-language biographical action film based on the life of Phoolan Devi
- The Burning Season (1994) – biographical drama television film chronicling environmental activist Chico Mendes' fight to protect the Amazon rainforest
- Carl, My Childhood Symphony (Danish: Min fynske barndom) (1994) – Danish biographical drama film about the childhood of the Danish composer Carl Nielsen
- Cobb (1994) – biographical sport drama film about Al Stump who was hired as a ghostwriter for Ty Cobb and discovers just how dark the baseball legend's real story is
- Col. Billy Bibit, RAM (1994) – Filipino biographical action film based on the life of the late colonel Billy Bibit
- Cries from the Heart (1994) – drama television film about a seven-year-old autistic boy who has trouble with verbalization but a real talent for technology, who uses a computer to plead for help after being molested at school, based on a true story
- Cries Unheard: The Donna Yaklich Story (1994) – thriller drama television film telling the story of Donna Yaklich who hired assassins to kill her husband
- The Day the Sun Turned Cold (Mandarin: 天国逆子) (1994) – Hong Kong crime drama film about a real life murder investigation
- The Diary of Evelyn Lau (1994) – Canadian biographical drama television film about Evelyn Lau, a teenager who runs away from home and becomes a drug-addicted prostitute
- Doomsday Gun (1994) – action drama television film dramatizing the life of Canadian supergun designer Dr. Gerald Bull and his involvement in Project Babylon, Saddam Hussein's plan to build a supergun with a range of over 500 miles (800 km)
- Ed Wood (1994) – biographical comedy drama film concerning the period in Ed Wood's life when he made his best-known films as well as his relationship with actor Bela Lugosi
- Farinelli (1994) – biographical drama film centring on the life and career of the 18th-century Italian opera singer Carlo Broschi, known as Farinelli, considered the greatest castrato singer of all time; as well as his relationship with his brother, the composer Riccardo Broschi
- The Fatima Buen Story (1994) – Filipino biographical crime drama film based on the actual case of Fatima Buen, a woman jailed for illegal recruitment
- For the Love of Aaron (1994) – Canadian drama television film based on the true story of Margaret Gibson, a noted Canadian writer who suffered from bipolar disorder, dramatizing her custody battle for her son Aaron after her divorce
- For the Love of Nancy (1994) – drama television film based on a true story of a woman suffering from anorexia nervosa
- Frank and Jesse (1994) – biographical Western drama film based on the story of Jesse James
- Getting Gotti (1994) – crime drama television film centring on an Assistant United States Attorney named Diane Giacalone, and her attempts to build a Racketeer Influenced and Corrupt Organizations Act (RICO) case against John Gotti and the Gambino crime family
- The Glass Shield (1994) – crime drama film based on a true story about the first black cop to be assigned to a California sheriff's department
- Heavenly Creatures (1994) – New Zealander biographical psychological drama film based on the notorious 1954 Parker–Hulme murder case in Christchurch
- I Can't Sleep (French: J'ai pas sommeil) (1994) – French drama film loosely inspired by the murders committed by Thierry Paulin
- Immortal Beloved (1994) – biographical drama film narrating the life of composer Ludwig van Beethoven
- In the Best of Families (1994) – crime drama miniseries about the North Carolina family murders from 1984 to 1985
- It Could Happen to You (1994) – comedy romantic drama film about a police officer who promises to share his lottery ticket with a waitress in lieu of a tip, inspired by a real-life news story
- Jacob (1994) – Christian drama television film based on a biblical account from the Book of Genesis about Jacob
- Joan the Maid (French: Jeanne la pucelle) (1994) – French historical drama film chronicling the life of Joan of Arc from the French perspective
- Kabloonak (1994) – Canadian adventure drama film about the making of Nanook of the North, a 1922 film about an Inuk called Nanook and his family in the Canadian Arctic
- Ladybird, Ladybird (1994) – British drama film depicting an account of an abused working-class woman whose six children are taken away by the social services, one of them almost immediately after delivery in hospital, based on a true story
- Lakota Woman: Siege at Wounded Knee (1994) – drama television film based on Mary Crow Dog's autobiography Lakota Woman, wherein she accounts her troubled youth, involvement with the American Indian Movement, and relationship with Lakota medicine man and activist Leonard Crow Dog
- Lies of the Heart: The Story of Laurie Kellogg (1994) – crime drama television film about Laurie Kellogg, who was accused of murdering her husband Bruce in May 1992
- Life with Billy (1994) – Canadian drama television film about Jane Hurshman who shot her common-law husband, Billy Stafford, in his sleep
- The Madness of King George (1994) – British historical comedy drama film telling the true story of British King George III's deteriorating mental health, and his equally declining relationship with his eldest son, the Prince of Wales, particularly focusing on the period around the Regency Crisis of 1788–89
- Madonna: Innocence Lost (1994) – biographical drama television film about the early years of Madonna's career
- The Maggie dela Riva Story: God... Why Me? (1994) – Filipino crime drama film dramatizing the case of actress Maggie de la Riva's ordeal in 1967
- Menendez: A Killing in Beverly Hills (1994) – crime drama television film about Lyle and Erik Menendez, who murdered their parents in 1989
- Mesmer (1994) – Austrian-Canadian-British-German biographical drama film about Franz Anton Mesmer and his radical new ways as a pioneering physician
- Mindbender (1994) – American-Israeli biographical drama film about the life of Uri Geller
- Mrs. Parker and the Vicious Circle (1994) – biographical drama film depicting the members of the Algonquin Round Table, a group of writers, actors and critics who met almost every weekday from 1919 to 1929 at Manhattan's Algonquin Hotel
- Murder or Memory? (1994) – crime drama television film about a mother who fights to prove her 14-year-old son is innocent of a murder he confessed to under hypnosis, based on a true story
- Nostradamus (1994) – biographical drama film recounting the life and loves of the physician, astrologer, and famed prognosticator, Nostradamus
- Octobre (1994) – Canadian French-language drama film depicting a version of the October Crisis from the point of view of the Chénier Cell, the FLQ terrorist cell who in 1970 kidnapped and murdered Quebec minister and Deputy Premier Pierre Laporte
- Of Love and Shadows (Spanish: De amor y de sombra) (1994) – Chilean-Argentine-American thriller drama film inspired by journalistic accounts taken from magazines, newspapers, and interviews that Isabel Allende gathered both working as a journalist in Chile before her exile and during her later career as a writer in Venezuela
- One of Her Own (1994) – drama television film based on a true story of a rookie policewoman who was raped by a fellow officer
- Out of Darkness (1994) – biographical drama television film about a paranoid schizophrenic woman who finds treatment to her mental illness after 18 years of suffering, based on a true story
- Pentathlon (1994) – action drama film inspired by the true story of Olympic athlete, Lutz Eigendorf, who escapes East Germany and is tracked down allegedly by Stasi and murdered
- The Postman (Italian: Il Postino) (1994) – Italian-French-Belgian comedy drama film about Chilean poet, Pablo Neruda
- Princess Caraboo (1994) – historical comedy drama film based on the real-life 19th-century character Princess Caraboo, who passed herself off in British society as an exotic princess who spoke a strange foreign language
- The Quality of Mercy (German: Hasenjagd – Vor lauter Feigheit gibt es kein Erbarmen) (1994) – Austrian war drama film dramatizing the events surrounding the Mühlviertler Hasenjagd, a Nazi war crime that took place near Linz, in the Mühlviertel region of Upper Austria, just before the end of the Second World War
- Queen Margot (French: La Reine Margot) (1994) – historical romantic drama film based on the life of Margaret of Valois
- Quiz Show (1994) – historical mystery drama film dramatizing the Twenty-One quiz show scandals of the 1950s
- Rise and Walk: The Dennis Byrd Story (1994) – biographical sport drama television film telling the true story of Dennis Byrd, his football career, his terrible accident, and his miraculous recovery and rehabilitation
- Road to Eilat (Egyptian Arabic: الطريق إلى إيلات) (1994) – Egyptian war drama film about the Egyptian raids on the Israeli port of Eilat during the War of Attrition in 1969
- The Road to Wellville (1994) – comedy drama film telling the story of the doctor and clean-living advocate John Harvey Kellogg and his methods employed at the Battle Creek Sanitarium at the beginning of the 20th century
- Roswell (1994) – mystery drama television film based on a supposedly true story about the Roswell UFO incident, the alleged U.S. military capture of a flying saucer and its alien crew following a crash near the town of Roswell, New Mexico, in July 1947
- The Sex Life of the Belgians (French: La Vie sexuelle des Belges 1950–1978) (1994) – Belgian biographical comedy film depicting a semi-autobiography of the first 28 years of the director, the Flemish anarchist Jan Bucquoy
- Sister My Sister (1994) – British thriller drama film based on a true incident in Le Mans, France in 1933 called the Papin murder case, where two sisters brutally murdered their employer and her daughter
- Snowbound: The Jim and Jennifer Stolpa Story (1994) – drama television film based on a true story of Jim and Jennifer Stolpa and their infant son Clayton who were 500 miles from their home in Castro Valley, California, when they lost their way and were stranded in an endless wilderness of deep snow in northern Nevada, east of Cedarville, California
- Squanto: A Warrior's Tale (1994) – historical action adventure film loosely based on the actual historical Native American figure Squanto, and his life prior to and including the arrival of the Mayflower in 1620
- Tarzan of Manisa (Turkish: Manisa Tarzanı) (1994) – Turkish biographical drama film about Ahmet bin Carlak, also known as the "Tarzan of Manisa"
- Terror in the Night (1994) – drama thriller television film about a fugitive killer posing as a policeman who arrests two campers in the Arizona mountains, based on a true story
- Thicker Than Blood: The Larry McLinden Story (1994) – biographical drama television film based on a true story of a Californian custody battle
- Tom & Viv (1994) – American-British biographical romantic drama film about the early love life of American poet T. S. Eliot
- Tonya and Nancy: The Inside Story (1994) – biographical sport drama television film focusing on the 1994 Cobo Arena attack on Nancy Kerrigan and the extensive media coverage surrounding the infamous incident
- Ultimate Betrayal (1994) – drama television film based on a true story about two sisters who sue their father for incest and child abuse
- White Mile (1994) – thriller drama television film loosely based on a rafting accident, on 1 August 1987, on the White Mile rapids in the Bidwell Canyon section of the Chilko River, in the Central Interior of British Columbia, Canada
- Wing Chun (Cantonese: 詠春) (1994) – Hong Kong martial arts film about Yim Wing-chun
- Wyatt Earp (1994) – epic Western adventure film covering the lawman of the same name's life, from an Iowa farmboy, to a feared marshal, to the feud in Tombstone, Arizona that led to the O.K. Corral gunfight
- Wyatt Earp: Return to Tombstone (1994) – Western biographical adventure television film about American lawman and gambler in the American West, Wyatt Earp
