= Edwin Boyd =

Edwin Boyd may refer to:

- Edwin Alonzo Boyd (1914–2002), Canadian criminal
- Citizen Gangster, originally titled Edwin Boyd, a 2011 Canadian film
- Edwin Alonzo Boyd (book), a book by Brian Vallée
