= The War on Women (book) =

War on Women
- Original edition cover
- Author: Brian Vallée
- Language: English
- Published: 2007 Key Porter
- Publication place: Canada
- Media type: Print
- ISBN: 1-55263-828-6

The War on Women is a non-fiction book written by Brian Vallée that was published in 2007. Focused on domestic violence this book continues the conversations Vallée previously engaged about domestic abuse in his books Life with Billy and Life After Billy. This is the last book Vallée completed prior to his death in July 2011. The foreword of the book was written by Stephen Lewis.

== Synopsis ==
This is a non-fiction work focused on domestic violence, abusive relationships, and Canada's legal response to domestic abuse. The book was inspired by the experience of Canadian country music promoter Elly Armour who contacted Brian Vallée years after her experience living with domestic abuse and her eventual decision to shoot her abusive husband, Vernon Ince. Armour was charged with murder but was acquitted by a jury when her case went to trial. Armour's experience was very similar to that of Jane Hurshman who Vallée wrote about previously in Life with Billy.

The War on Women brings together the experience of Armour, Hurshman, and other survivors of domestic abuse. The book also connects these individual cases of violence to larger societal problems around gender, class, and the Canadian legal system.
