= The Ascent (1994 film) =

- Theatrical poster
- Directed by: Donald Shebib; Rick Ridgeway; Mark Haber
- Written by: David Wiltse
- Based on: No Picnic on Mount Kenya; 1946 novel by Miklós László
- Produced by: Njeri Karago; (executive producers): Robert Halmi, Jr.; Thomas Molito; Robert Bantle
- Starring: Vincent Spano; Ben Cross; Tony Lo Bianco; Rachel Ward
- Cinematography: David Connell
- Edited by: Ron Wisman
- Music by: Irwin Fisch
- Production companies: RHI Entertainment in association with; Cabin Fever Entertainment
- Release date: September 1994 (TIFF)
- Running time: 96 minutes
- Country: United States
- Language: English

The Ascent is a 1994 American war adventure film directed by Donald Shebib. The film is an adaptation of a memoir by a then Italian prisoner of war in 1942 British East Africa who challenges his English captor in a climb of Mount Kenya.

== Plot ==
During the 1942 African Campaign of the Second World War, an isolated British East African POW camp sits on a dusty plain in the shadow of Mount Kenya, said to be one of the most difficult mountains in the world to climb. The camp is staffed mainly by African subjects overseen by a few British soldiers and their commander, the stiff-lipped Major David Farrell (Ben Cross), who lost both his wife and child to the war. One of the Major's preoccupations has been attempting to ascend one of Kenya's forbidding southern approaches, but he has been frustrated, his failure a joke amongst the mostly Italian prisoners, including his nemesis Franco Distassi (Vincent Spano), a world-class climber who has attempted escape five times.

Succeeding on his sixth breakout attempt, Franco steals a jeep and makes his way through the Kenyan countryside to a small village, crashing the jeep to avoid hitting another truck stuck in the road. After an initial misunderstanding with the occupants, an industrialist and his daughter, Patricia (Rachel Ward), Franco fixes their truck and stays for lunch. He resembles Patricia's late husband, and his intelligence and charm leave an impression on her.

When the British catch up with him, Franco goes quietly. Standing before the Major, he taunts the commander for failing to conquer the mountain, further vexing him. Franco is put into solitary confinement. The demoralized commanding officer of the Italians, Enzo (Tony Lo Bianco), devises a scheme to regain his and the others' honor: a select band will escape to climb Mount Kenya with the aim of reaching the 16,300 ft Point Lenana and planting the Italian flag there before returning to the camp, a feat that will also humiliate their captors. Franco agrees with the proviso that he makes his own descent from the other side into Italian-occupied Somalia. Gear is produced by artisan prisoners, including the German Kist (Rico Vanden Hurck), who trades his compass for a place on the three-man climbing team.

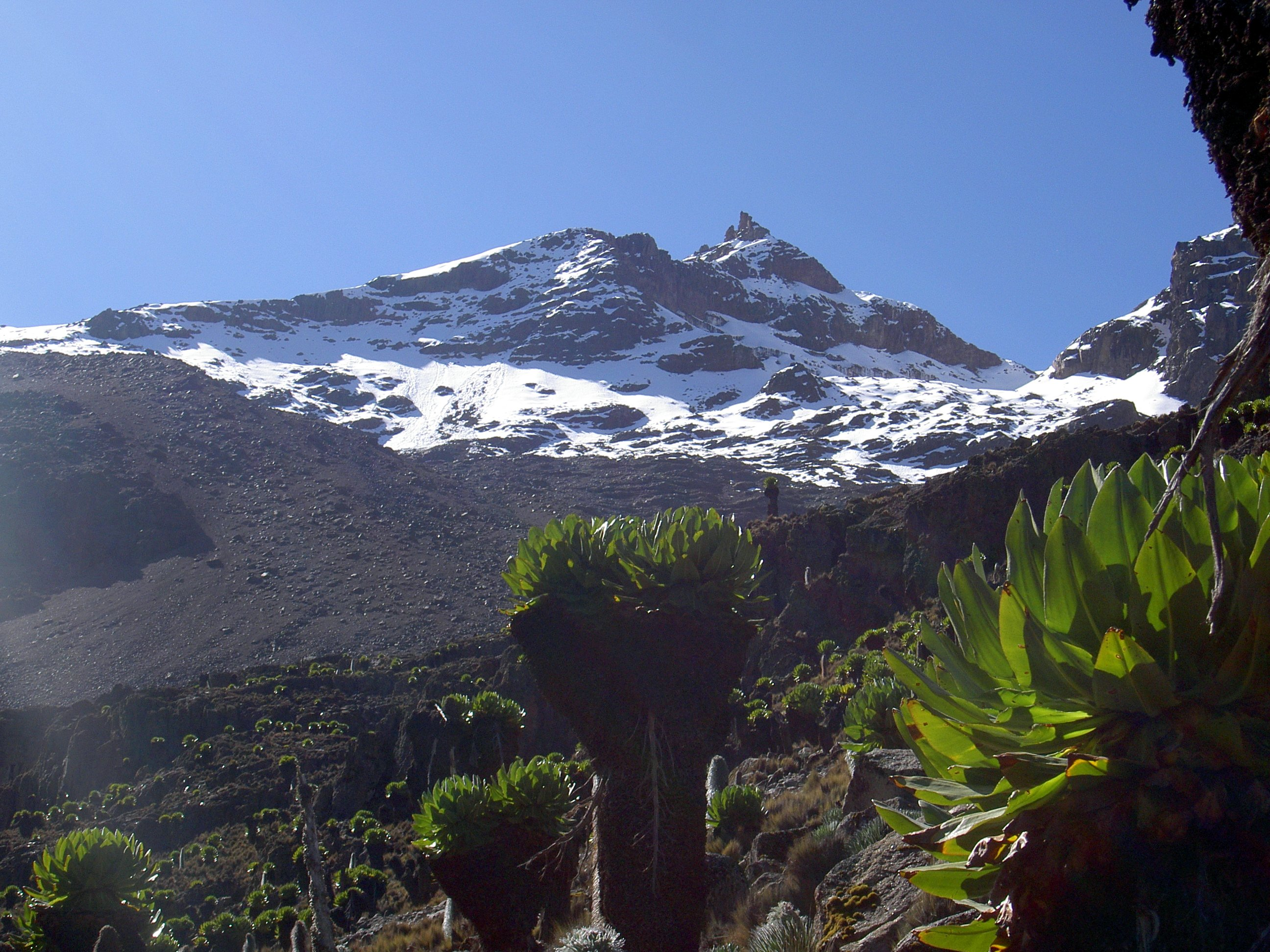
Point Lenana, Mount Kenya

Franco is away from the camp after he agrees to repair the industrialist's antiquated sawmill, where he and Patricia share a romantic interlude in the hayloft. When the Major, who had pressed his own unsuccessful suit with her, finds out, his ensuing rage pushes the POWs to put their plan in motion immediately, with Franco, Enzo, and Kist making good their escape. Once over the wire, however, Kist betrays the Italians and flees but is quickly captured, revealing their plan to the Major, who prepares to give chase up the mountainside.

Mountain sickness leaves Enzo unable to continue, so Franco proceeds alone for days, sometimes catching a glimpse of the Major across the canyons. At night they engage in shouted banter with one another, inflaming the Major's envy of Franco's mountaineering skill and jealousy over Patricia. At the summit, the Major has Franco in his sights and implores him to halt. Franco buries the flag and surrenders, returning to the camp a hero.

== Cast ==
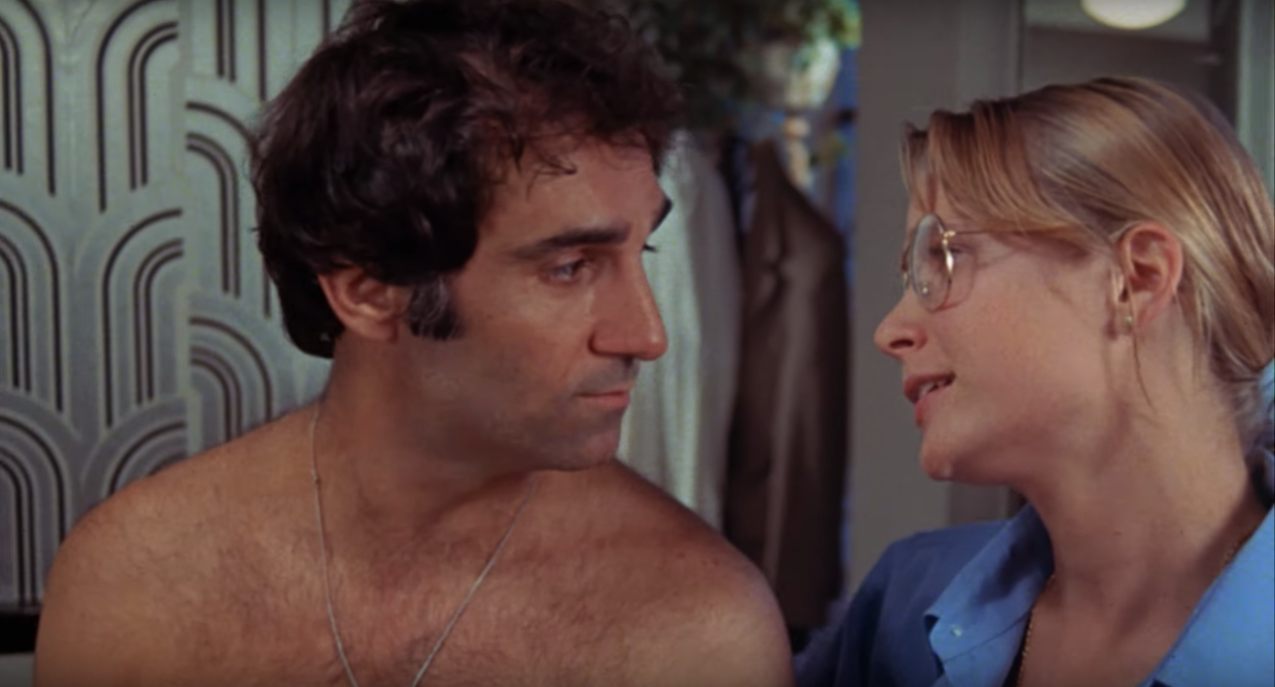
Tony Lo Bianco called the film Wop on Top

=== Main ===
- Vincent Spano • Franco Distassi
- Ben Cross • Major David Farrell
- Tony Lo Bianco • Enzo
- Rachel Ward • Patricia

=== Supporting ===
- Mark Ingall • Sergeant Thomas
- John De Veillers • Major Quinn
- Joe Valadez • Guido
- Jon Freeman • Paulo
- Rico Vanden Hurck • Kirst
- Kenneth Mason • Stewart
- Nigel Kynaston • Carlo
- Rodrigo S. Lacruz • Francesco
- Leslie Cardillo • Ugo
- Rory McGuinness • Andrew
- Asiba Asiba • Kimbo
- Oby Obyerodhyambo • Mathew
- Simon Thomas Kenyon • Geoffrey Stewart
- Philip Chege • African Hunter

Four askari are played by Titi Wainaina, Jacob Otieno, Konga Mbandu, Lenny Juma.

== Themes and inspiration ==
Donald Shebib described The Ascent as being about Italian honor, "a person caught between personal good and the common good."

A lot of it was inspired by that joke about Italy having the thinnest book of war heroes. The Germans were always bailing them out and had no respect for the Italian soldiers. The Italians were tired of being made to feel inferior by both the British and the Germans. Tony Lo Bianco called the film "Wop on Top."

== Production ==
=== Background and development ===
The Ascent is based on Felice Benuzzi's Italian war memoir, No Picnic on Mount Kenya, about a series of events that took place at Camp 354 near Nanyuki, Kenya. The story was adapted for television in 1953 as an episode of Robert Montgomery Presents. Njeri Karago is a native of Kenya who earned master's degrees from UCLA in film studies and human resource management before becoming a producer at RHI (later Hallmark Entertainment). The film is among the first to be produced in association with Cabin Fever Entertainment, which announced its setting up of a film production subsidiary in November 1993.

A climber himself, Canadian director Donald Shebib had made a mountaineering film once before, The Climb (1986), also an adaptation of a book. Shebib acknowledged that David Wiltse's script added or changed events as presented in Benuzzi's memoir.

=== Filming and marketing ===
The Ascent was shot entirely on location in Kenya. Njeri Karago "had a place" near the main location.

Principal photography took place over nineteen days, with ten days on Mount Kenya out of an intended twelve, getting up to "about 15,000 feet [5,000 meters]", Shebib remarking that he had to train and get into shape before he could direct the film. One of the crew, Rick Ridgeway, wrote the introduction for a recent edition of No Picnic on Mount Kenya. Ridgeway, a mountaineer "of international reputation" who climbed K2, the world's second-highest peak, was responsible for the alpine scenes. One of the crew died on the first day on the mountain:

Mount Kenya is 17,000 feet [5,600 meters]. It's easy to get up to 12,000 [4,000 meters] or 15,000 feet [5,000 meters], but you have to do it in three or four days, you can't just do it all in one day. You get mountain sickness and die. The guy who died was a local, so he should have been more climatized, but he went up too quickly. Vincent got mountain sickness.

Scenes with wild animals, such as the zebras, were filmed with the animals in their natural habitat, and with minimal contact with humans or technology.

The Ascent was billed as the "highest altitude film ever made."

== Release and reception ==
The Ascent was reported in the Los Angeles Times as having a premiere date set for September 15, 1994 at the Toronto International Film Festival, but Todd McCarthy's review gives the date as "Sept. 13." A third source gives September 9.

=== Home media and streaming ===
The Ascent was released on VHS, but does not appear to have had a DVD or Blu-ray release.

The film is available for streaming in the US on the mountaineering and climbing films website mntnfilm.com and Apple TV.

=== Critical response ===
VideoHound's Golden Movie Retriever gives The Ascent 2.5 stars out of 5.

Todd McCarthy reviewed the film in Variety after its Toronto premiere: "Donald Shebib has mounted the proceedings in presentable fashion and the performances are agreeable enough, but it's the unbeatable locations that provide the greatest diversion here", going on to fault the national stereotype-laden script as "devoid of ironies or complexity", the sort of "passable but instantly forgettable wartime" action film that was once reasonable double-bill fodder but for which there is no room in the modern theatrical marketplace: "mid-range fare, spelling a video/cable/TV fate", with the possible exception of the Italian market where it might do well theatrically.

TV Guide's review similarly finds the film "efficiently directed and often gorgeous to look at," but with an "ultra-traditional narrative, easy masculine camaraderie, and uncomplicated wartime bonding," like some "artifact of simpler, less cynical times." The Ascent is a reasonable, if anachronistic, simulation of the "great POW epics of the past" like The Great Escape and The Bridge on the River Kwai but contemporary American audiences no longer have the patience for this kind of "muscular, relatively innocent, wartime adventure."
