= Boyd Gang =

20th-century criminal gang based in Toronto, Ontario, Canada

The Boyd Gang was a notorious criminal gang based in Toronto, Ontario, Canada, named for member Edwin Alonzo Boyd. The gang was famous in the media at the time because of their actions, which included bank robberies, jail breaks, relationships with women, gun fights, manhunts, and captures.

== Formation ==
Edwin Boyd had committed a variety of crimes in his youth and served time in Saskatchewan's Prince Albert Penitentiary at the age of 22. After returning from service in the Second World War, Boyd robbed a Toronto branch of the Bank of Montreal with a German Luger on September 9, 1949, while drunk and escaped with US$3,000 (equivalent to $40,594 in 2025) With others, he committed six more robberies before he was caught and imprisoned in the Don Jail. There he met Willie Jackson and Lenny Jackson (not related) and together they broke out of jail with a hacksaw concealed in Lenny's artificial leg. After their escape, they were joined by Valent Lesso (a.k.a. Steve Suchan) and committed four more robberies in four months for US$75,000 (equivalent to $1,003,631 in 2025). Although Lenny Jackson, a hairdresser from Niagara Falls, led the group, Boyd's charms and good looks led the media to label them the "Boyd Gang".

== Death of a policeman ==
On March 6, 1952, Detective Sergeant Edmund Tong and his partner, Sergeant Roy Perry stopped a vehicle containing two men; these two men turned out to be Lennie Jackson and Steve Suchan. As Tong approached the vehicle, Suchan drew a .455 pistol and shot him and Sergeant Perry in the police car, wounding the latter in the arm. Tong died of his wounds on March 23, 1952.

Both Jacksons and Suchan were arrested in Montreal after a shootout with police that left Lennie and Steve wounded. Both men were convicted and sentenced to death by hanging for the murder of the policeman. Boyd was arrested separately, in Toronto.

== Second escape ==
All four men were placed in side-by-side cells in the Don Jail. On Sept. 8, 1952, they managed to escape for a second time with the help of another saw blade, and a blank key smuggled in by a lawyer. They used a tactic where William Jackson, dehydrated himself enough to reduce his skin elasticity. Willy pressed the key on the palm of his hand, making a mark in the shape of the key. Using the new saw, they cut the blank key in the shape of the mark. That night, the Canadian Broadcasting Corporation's first television newscast, anchored by Lorne Greene and produced by Harry Rasky, detailed the escape.

The jail's warden was suspended, and a $26,000 reward was offered for information leading to their arrest.

== Recapture ==
Ten days later, they were discovered hiding in a barn about a mile north of Sheppard Avenue and Leslie Street after Willie Jackson went to Yonge Street and Sheppard in North York to buy food and cigarettes. Lennie Jackson and Steve Suchan were quickly tried for murder. Although they were defended by prominent lawyers Arthur Maloney and John Josiah Robinette (respectively), both men were found guilty and sentenced to death. While Jackson had not fired a shot at Tong, he essentially confessed on the stand, which undoubtedly hurt their case. They were executed in a double hanging at the Don Jail in December 1952.

Edwin Boyd, who had not been present at the murder, was defended by Frederick Joseph McMahon, and sentenced to eight life terms plus 27 years concurrently. Willie Jackson was sentenced to 31 years. Both served their terms in Kingston Penitentiary. Jackson was released on parole in 1966. Boyd was released earlier, in 1962, but returned to prison for four more years after parole violations. He then moved to the west coast of Canada where he changed his name and remarried. He died in 2002.

== Unsolved murder ==
Journalist Brian Vallée, who interviewed an ageing Edwin Boyd for Edwin Alonzo Boyd, has alleged that Boyd was also responsible for the unsolved 1947 murder of George Vigus and Iris Scott in Toronto's High Park.

== Popular culture ==
The 2011 film Citizen Gangster depicts the life of Edwin and the gang. It premiered at the 2011 Toronto International Film Festival and its theatrical release was in May 2012. The movie changes the identity of the detective whose death is described above and materially changes the circumstances of the shooting.

There is also a play written by John Roby and Ray Storey based on the events called "Girls in the Gang".

== Bibliography ==
- The Boyd Gang by Marjorie Lamb and Barry Pearson. Toronto, Peter Martin Associates, 1976.
