= Evelyn Dick =

Canadian criminal (born 1920)

- Born: Evelyn MacLean; October 13, 1920; Beamsville, Ontario, Canada
- Status: Unknown
- Spouse: John Dick (m. 1945, died)
- Children: 2
- Status: Paroled
- Convictions: Murder (overturned); Manslaughter
- Penalty: Death (overturned); Life imprisonment

Evelyn Dick (née MacLean, born October 13, 1920) was a Canadian socialite suspected of killing her husband and son although she never confessed to either crime. She served time for manslaughter from 1947 to 1958 and subsequently disappeared. She was issued a pardon under the royal prerogative of mercy in 1985. Her trials remain among the most sensationalized events in Canadian criminal history.

== Background and case ==
Evelyn MacLean was born in Beamsville, Ontario to Scottish immigrants Donald and Alexandra MacLean. A year after her birth, her family moved to 214 Rosslyn Avenue South, Hamilton, Ontario. Her father was an abusive alcoholic who collected firearms. He worked as a streetcar conductor for the Hamilton Street Railway (HSR) and was later found to have stolen $200,000 from them.

At the age of 24 MacLean married John Dick, a 39 year-old man from a Mennonite family who migrated to Canada to escape the Russian Revolution. John, who also worked for the HSR, threatened to expose Donald MacLean's fraud. Evelyn began a sexual relationship with a new boyfriend, Bill Bohozuk, days after her marriage and separated from John within three months. John Dick disappeared after another three months.

After John was reported missing, a human torso was found on the Hamilton Mountain near Albion Falls by five local children, Faith Reid, David Reid, Fred Weaver, Jim Weaver and Bob Weaver. A cyst on the torso’s posterior and an undescended testicle allowed the victim to be identified as John. John's head and limbs had been sawn from his body and — as later evidence revealed — were disposed of in the furnace of Evelyn's home at 32 Carrick Avenue. Evelyn, Donald MacLean and Bill Bohozuk were subsequently charged with murder. Bohozuk was cleared of wrongdoing despite attempts by Dick to place blame on him.

Evelyn and her father were put on trial in 1946. The event drew large crowds due to the grim nature of the crime and the revelation that Dick kept a black book with a record of all her sexual encounters. Dick estimated that she had had sex with 150 men, most of whom were more wealthy than her husband. In court, she stated that one of those men was the judge's son. J.J. Sullivan defended Dick unsuccessfully and the jury convicted her and sentenced her to death by hanging. With the help of a new lawyer, J.J. Robinette, Dick appealed her case and won an eventual acquittal. MacLean was found guilty of being an accessory after the fact and was sent to prison for four years. As part of the investigation, a partly mummified body of a male infant was found in Dick's attic, encased in cement in an old suitcase.

Dick had given birth three times and invented a man named "Norman White" to conceal the identity of each baby's father. Her children were Peter David White, Heather Maria White and a second daughter who was stillborn. The body in Dick's attic was identified as that of Peter David White, sparking a second murder trial. This began in 1947 and Dick was sentenced to life in prison but paroled in 1958 after serving only eleven years in Kingston's Prison for Women. With a new identity and job, Evelyn Dick disappeared from public view and her file was permanently sealed after her 1985 pardon.

== In the media and popular culture ==
A well known school yard song, (with a double entendre) at the time of the murders went as follows:

You cut off his legs...
You cut off his arms...
You cut off his head...
How could you Mrs Dick?
How could you Mrs Dick?

The Forgotten Rebels used these lyrics for the song "Evelyn Dick" on their (Untitled) album in 1989. "How Could You Mrs Dick" became the title of a 1982 CBC Radio special written by Douglas Rodger and narrated by Eddie Greenspan. It was subsequently turned into a 1989 play which ran at Hamilton venues in 1991, 1999 and 2004.

In 2001 Canadian author Brian Vallée authored The Torso Murder: The Untold Story of Evelyn Dick a book focusing on Dick's murder trial and subsequent disappearance. A 2002 television film, Torso: The Evelyn Dick Story, suggests Dick protected her parents, who were also viable suspects in the murder of her baby and husband, and that she was sexually abused by her father and exploited by both parents (especially by her mother) to provide them a higher standing and income. The movie was originally scheduled to be aired on September 11, 2001, but was delayed until March 18, 2002 due to the terrorist attacks on the original air date.

Hamilton author James King listed the Evelyn Dick story as partial inspiration for his 2000 novel Blue Moon. The case was also the subject of the 2005 film noir musical, Black Widow. In 2014, designer Chris Farias released a line of merchandise including clothing and kitchen items themed around Dick. This was met with protests by the men's rights group Canadian Association for Equality.
