= Edwin Alonzo Boyd (book) =

Edwin Alonzo Boyd: The Story of the Notorious Boyd Gang
- First Edition Cover
- Author: Brian Vallée
- Language: English
- Genre: Non-fiction
- Published: 1997 Doubleday Canada
- Publication place: Canada
- Media type: Print
- ISBN: 978-0-385-25827-2

Edwin Alonzo Boyd: The Story of the Notorious Boyd Gang is a non-fiction book written by Brian Vallée. It was published in 1997 by Doubleday Canada. This work revolves around the life of notorious Canadian bank robber Edwin Alonzo Boyd and his role in the Boyd Gang. Vallée worked closed with Boyd in the writing of this book and spent considerable time interviewing Boyd about his memories of his criminal career.

== Adaptations ==
In addition to writing Edwin Alonzo Boyd: The Story of the Notorious Boyd Gang, in 2002 Brian Vallée helped produce the CBC documentary on Boyd, Unmaking the Myth: The Life and Times of Edwin Alonzo Boyd. In 2011 the film Citizen Gangster, depicting the life of Edwin and the gang, premiered at the 2011 Toronto International Film Festival. It won the Toronto International Film Festival Award for Best Canadian First Feature Film.
