= John Josiah Robinette =

Canadian lawyer

- Born: November 20, 1906; Toronto, Ontario
- Died: November 18, 1996 (aged 89)
- Education: University of Toronto, Osgoode Hall Law School
- Occupation: Lawyer
- Awards: Order of Canada; Order of Ontario

John Josiah Robinette, CC OOnt QC (November 20, 1906 – November 18, 1996) was a Canadian lawyer who was one of Canada's premier legal authorities and litigators.

Born in Toronto, Ontario, he attended the University of Toronto Schools. In 1926, he received a B.A. in political science from the University of Toronto, where he was a member of the Beta Theta Pi fraternity. He graduated from Osgoode Hall Law School and was called to the bar in 1929.

He joined the Toronto firm of McCarthy & McCarthy (now McCarthy Tetrault) in 1949 and stayed until his retirement in the early 90s.

He became renowned as a barrister and was lead counsel in a number of prominent cases. In 1947, he appealed and eventually won the case of Evelyn Dick after her conviction for murder in 1946. In 1952 he unsuccessfully defended the notorious bank robbers, The Boyd Gang. He was lead counsel in the Patriation Reference before the Supreme Court of Canada. Robinette was also hired by opponents of the cancelled Spadina Expressway in 1971 to make their case at the Ontario Municipal Board.

He was appointed King's Counsel in 1944.

From 1958 until 1962 he was treasurer of the Law Society of Upper Canada.

In 1973 he was made a Companion of the Order of Canada. He served as Chancellor of Trent University from 1984 to 1987.

Academic offices
Preceded by Margaret Laurence	Chancellor of Trent University; 1984–1987	Succeeded by Kenneth Hare
