= Life After Billy =

- 1993 hardcover edition
- Author: Brian Vallée
- Language: English
- Genre: Nonfiction, crime
- Publisher: Seal Books
- Publication date: 1993
- Publication place: Canada
- Media type: Print
- ISBN: 0-770-42622-0

Life After Billy is a nonfiction book written by Brian Vallée published in 1993. Life After Billy is a sequel to Vallée's acclaimed book Life With Billy. Life After Billy focuses on the long-term impacts of domestic violence and life after leaving an abusive partner. The book continues to follow the experiences of Jane Hurshman whom Vallée wrote about in Life With Billy

== Summary ==
Life After Billy picks up where the Life With Billy book by Vallée concluded. This book continues to focus on domestic violence through the lens of Jane Hurshman's experience. In 1982 Hurshamn shot and killed her common-law partner, Billy Stafford. Jane was found not guilty of murder and was sentenced for manslaughter. Her case set precedents in Canada for cases involving battered women syndrome. Life After Billy focuses on Hurshman's experience following the non-guilty verdict and her work as a fighter against domestic abuse. Hurshman died by suicide in 1992, ten years after Stafford's death. Vallée addresses her death through Life After Billy and uses it as a focal point for discussing the long-term impacts of abusive relationships.

== Versions ==
The print run of Life After Billy was produced by Seal Books in 1993. This original hardcover edition is long out of print and can no longer be purchased.

In 1995 a second version of Life After Billy was released as a paperback. Published by Seal Books - McClellan-Bantam Inc., this version of the book is currently out of print. Limited copies are still in circulation.

In 1998 Life and Death With Billy was published by Seal Books. This edition marked the first timeLife with Billy and Life After Billy were published as one volume.
