= No Picnic on Mount Kenya =

1946 book by Felice Benuzzi

- 1953 First Edition USA
- Author: Felice Benuzzi
- Original title: Fuga sul Kenya
- Language: English
- Genre: Narrative history
- Media type: Hardback and Paperback
- Pages: 239

This image of Mount Kenya on an Oxo tin provided the three escapees with information on the unseen south face of the mountain.

No Picnic on Mount Kenya (Italian: Fuga sul Kenya) by Felice Benuzzi is a mountaineering classic recounting the 1943 attempt of three escaped Italian prisoners of war to reach the summit of Mount Kenya. It was first published in 1946 in English and 1947 in Italian. The 1994 film The Ascent is based on this book.

== Synopsis ==
Detained at POW Camp 354 near Nanyuki, Kenya, Felice Benuzzi from Trieste, together with two fellow-prisoners Dr. Giovanni ('Giuàn') Balletto from Genova and Vincenzo ('Enzo') Barsotti from Lido di Camaiore, escaped in January 1943 and climbed Mt Kenya with improvised equipment and meagre rations, two of them reaching a point on the north face of the Petit Gendarme, at about 5000 metres, high up the NW ridge. After an eventful 18-day period on the mountain (24 January – 10 February), and to the astonishment of the British camp commandant, the three adventurers broke back into Camp 354. As reward for their exploit, they each received 28 days in solitary confinement, commuted to 7 days by the camp commandant in acknowledgement of their "sporting effort".

From the flyleaf of the 1952 William Kimber edition of the book:

"One of the most unusual adventures of the war years has now been written by the man who led it, and who has the ability to tell his story with the accuracy and vividness that compels the readers to live through it with him. Felice Benuzzi was housed at a British administered a POW camp facing Mount Kenya (5,199 m – 17,058 ft). The depressing tedium of camp life and the fascination of the mountain combined to inspire him with a plan. He first put the prospect of escaping to climb it to a fellow POW who was a professional mountaineer. The expert told him that the idea was mad, that they would need six months' training on first-class food and porters to carry equipment to a base camp. But Benuzzi was not to be put off. Eventually he got two others to conspire with him, a doctor and a sailor. Surreptitiously they improvised scant equipment and saved what food they could from rations. Their only 'map' of the mountain was a sketch of it on the label of an Oxo tin.

"And then they escaped, and went to climb the mountain. The sailor was ill immediately after break-out but decided to carry on. The lower reaches of Kenya are jungle and forest infested with big game. They were unarmed, and their encounters with the animals are some of the most exciting passages in the story. But Benuzzi writes with a simplicity and vigour that take you with him every yard of the way. At the foot of the highest peak the sailor was too ill to go further, and Benuzzi and the doctor went forward to the climax of their adventure. Their way back was as hazardous as the ascent, and the tension never relaxes until they at last break back into the P.O.W. camp from which they had escaped and give themselves up to the British Commandant."

== Publishing history ==
Benuzzi, of Italian-Austrian parentage, initially wrote his account in both English and Italian from 1943 to 1946, while still in POW camps. The Italian version, with a marginally more detailed text, was first published in 1947 as Fuga sul Kenya – 17 giorni di libertà [:Escape on Kenya – 17 days of liberty] (L'Eroica, Milano). The Italian edition has as an Appendix (headed 'L'ignoto') a fuller version of the English Chapter 4, 'The Unknown', a digression that gives background historical information on the mountain. It also includes three sketches in black & white and four maps by Benuzzi, including a map of the peaks area showing his route up the NW ridge. The Italian version was translated into French and published in 1950 as Kenya, ou la Fugue Africaine [:Kenya, or the African Escape] (Arthaud, Paris; with black & white illustrations, including Benuzzi's sketch of the trio's base-camp in the Hausberg Valley, with the peaks in the background and the ascent-route marked). The 2nd Italian edition (Tamari, Bologna, 1966) has on the front cover, in colour, a reproduction of Benuzzi's watercolour of the mountain seen through the camp fence. 'Fuga' and 'Fugue' may also carry a secondary meaning, referring to the 'music' of the giant heather described in the book. The French edition helped inspire Roland Truffaut's August 1952 expedition to Mt Kenya, described in From Kenya to Kilimanjaro (London, 1957), during which the home-made crampons and other equipment of Benuzzi and Balletto were retrieved from Hausberg Col. These were later donated, with Benuzzi's permission, to the Musée de La Montagne, Chamonix. (Benuzzi's flag and message-bottle left on Lenana had been retrieved by English climbers; they were returned to Benuzzi who donated them to the Museo della Montagna, Torino.)

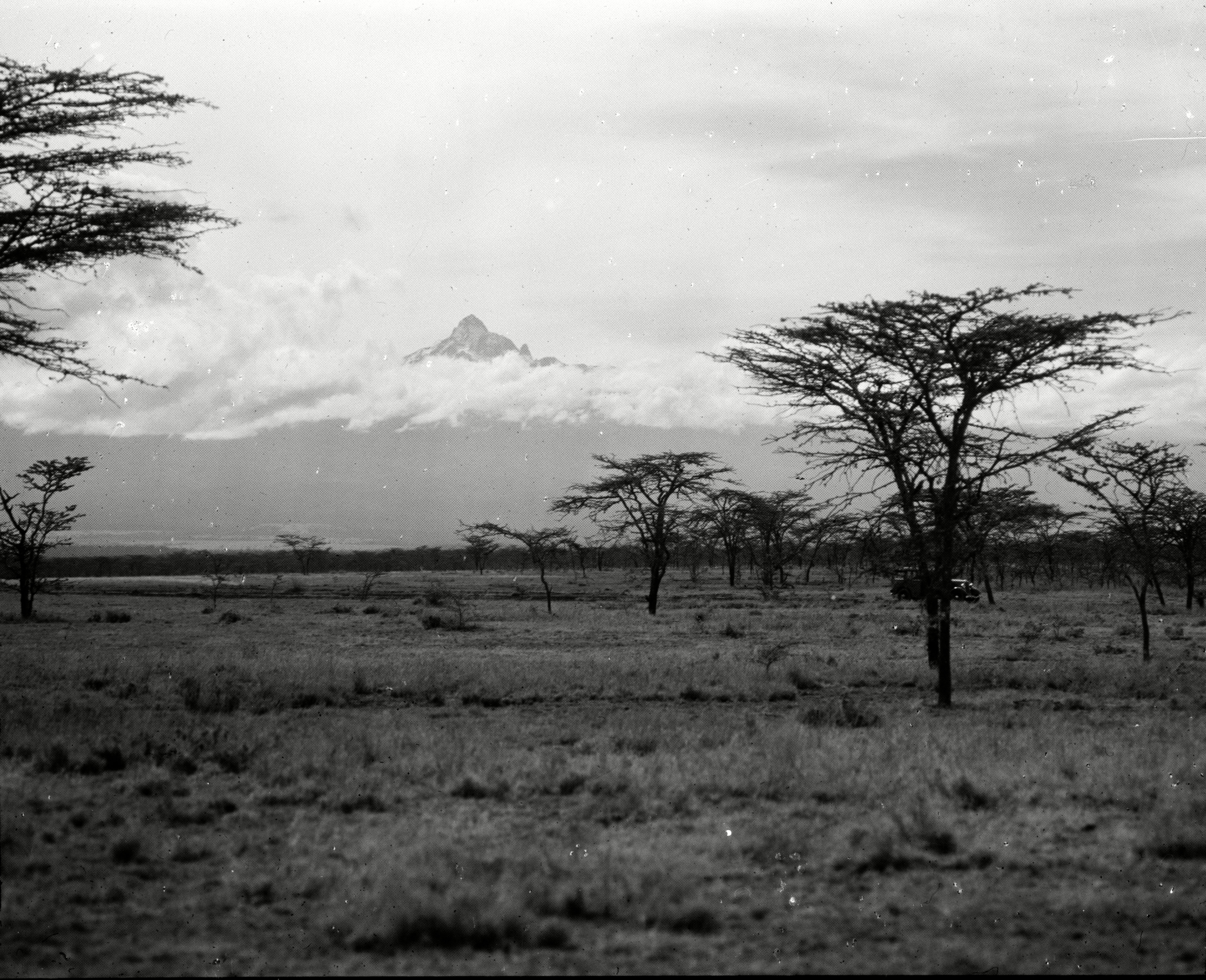
The NW face of Mount Kenya seen from the Nanyuki area, 1936: the view that inspired the adventure

The English version was published in February 1952 as No Picnic on Mount Kenya (William Kimber, London), with the subtitle The Story of Three P.O.W.s' Escape to Adventure. "No expedition on the mountain was ever a picnic" Vivienne de Watteville had written in her book Speak to the Earth (1935) about her 1929 visit to Mount Kenya. Benuzzi's English title, perhaps suggested by this line of de Watteville's, refers to the expression 'It was no picnic', meaning 'It was hard going', but with an ironic allusion to the climbers' meagre POW rations. There have been at least eighteen English impressions, some published without the subtitle. The Readers Union edition (1953), and the 'concise' version (ed. S. H. Burton) brought out by Longmans and Green in their 'Heritage of Literature Series' for schools (1960), helped popularise the book. The dust-cover of the English 2nd edition (Kimber, London, 1974) gives a 1970s' photograph of Benuzzi, Balletto and Barsotti and biographical updates; the 3rd English edition (Patrick Stephens Ltd, Wellingborough, 1989, Introduction by Rick Ridgeway), updates the biographical information. In 1999 Lyon Press republished the book with the subtitle A Daring Escape, a Perilous Climb. In 2015 MacLehose Press brought out a new edition, with some twenty of Benuzzi's own watercolours from the expedition (all, for the first time, in colour), two contemporary photos of the Nanyuki POW camp, and a full translation of 'L'ignoto' (see above) from the Italian original.

In 1953 No Picnic on Mount Kenya was translated into German under the title Gefangen vom Mount Kenia : gefährliche Flucht in ein Bergsteigerabenteuer, and in 2002 a new German edition was released with the new title Flucht ins Abenteuer : 3 Kriegsgefangene besteigen den Mount Kenya. The book has also been translated into Swedish.

This contrast of the freedom of the mountains against the oppression of man is the leitmotif of Benuzzi's book. Perhaps more than any climbing story, No Picnic on Mount Kenya captures that strong underpinning of revolt common to most mountaineers. The men and women I know drawn to the hills are mavericks whose principal loyalty is to the individual's right to take his own risks and discover his own truths, and as much as anyone, Benuzzi applauds that right and condemns those who might curtail it.

— Rick Ridgeway

== About the author ==
Felice Benuzzi was born in Vienna on 16 November 1910 and grew up in Trieste, doing his early mountaineering in the Julian Alps and Dolomites. He studied law at Rome University and represented Italy as an international swimmer in 1933–1935. He married in 1938 and had two daughters, one of whom, Daniela, married American diplomat Alan Ford. Benuzzi entered the Italian Colonial Service in 1938 and served in Italian-occupied Abyssinia, where he was captured by Allied forces when the country was liberated in 1941. He was imprisoned in Kenya (Nanyuki and Gilgil). Repatriated in August 1946, he entered the Italian Diplomatic Service in 1948, serving in Paris, Brisbane, Karachi, Canberra, West Berlin, and (as Head of Delegation) at the United Nations, before his appointment in 1973 as ambassador in Montevideo. Benuzzi retired to Rome (Via Nepi, 13), serving in retirement as Head of the Italian Delegation for the Antarctic. He died in Rome in July 1988. The col between Point Dutton and the Petit Gendarme on Mount Kenya has been named Benuzzi Col in his honour.

== Adaptations ==
In 1953 an episode of Robert Montgomery Presents was based on an adaptation of this book starring George Chandler. A film adaptation The Ascent was made in 1994, written by David Wiltse and directed by Donald Shebib.

== See also ==
- Mountaineering on Mount Kenya
