= A Marriage Minuet =

Play by David Wiltse

A Marriage Minuet is a two-act serio-comic play by David Wiltse. It revolves around the lives and relationships of two married couples: Douglas and Lily Zweig, and Rex and Violet Franklin. There are several other bit parts, all of which are portrayed by one woman (these parts are listed simply as Girl in the cast list).

There are several unique aspects of A Marriage Minuet, including graphics to indicate the locations of each scene, numerous soliloquies directed towards the audience, and the replacement of generic dialogue with descriptions thereof (such as "Egregious encomiums for under-cooked fish and over-cooked string beans.").
