= The Torso Murder =

2001 true crime book by Canadian author Brian Vallée

The Torso Murder: The Untold Story of Evelyn Dick
- Torso Murder book cover
- Author: Brian Vallée
- Language: English
- Genre: Non-fiction
- Published: 2001 Key Porter
- Publication place: Canada
- Media type: Print
- ISBN: 1-55263-340-3

The Torso Murder: The Untold Story of Evelyn Dick is a non-fiction book written by Brian Vallée. It was published in 2001 by Key Porter. The book focuses on the Evelyn Dick murder trial and the subsequent disappearance of Dick. The 1946-1947 murder trials of Dick are among the most publicized events in criminal history in Canada.

== Adaptations ==
On March 18, 2002 Torso: The Evelyn Dick Story a made-for-TV film aired on Canadian television. In 2002 Brian Vallée also assisted in the production of The Notorious Mrs. Dick a Real to Reel Productions documentary for CTV.
