= Brian Vallée =

Canadian author (1940–2011)

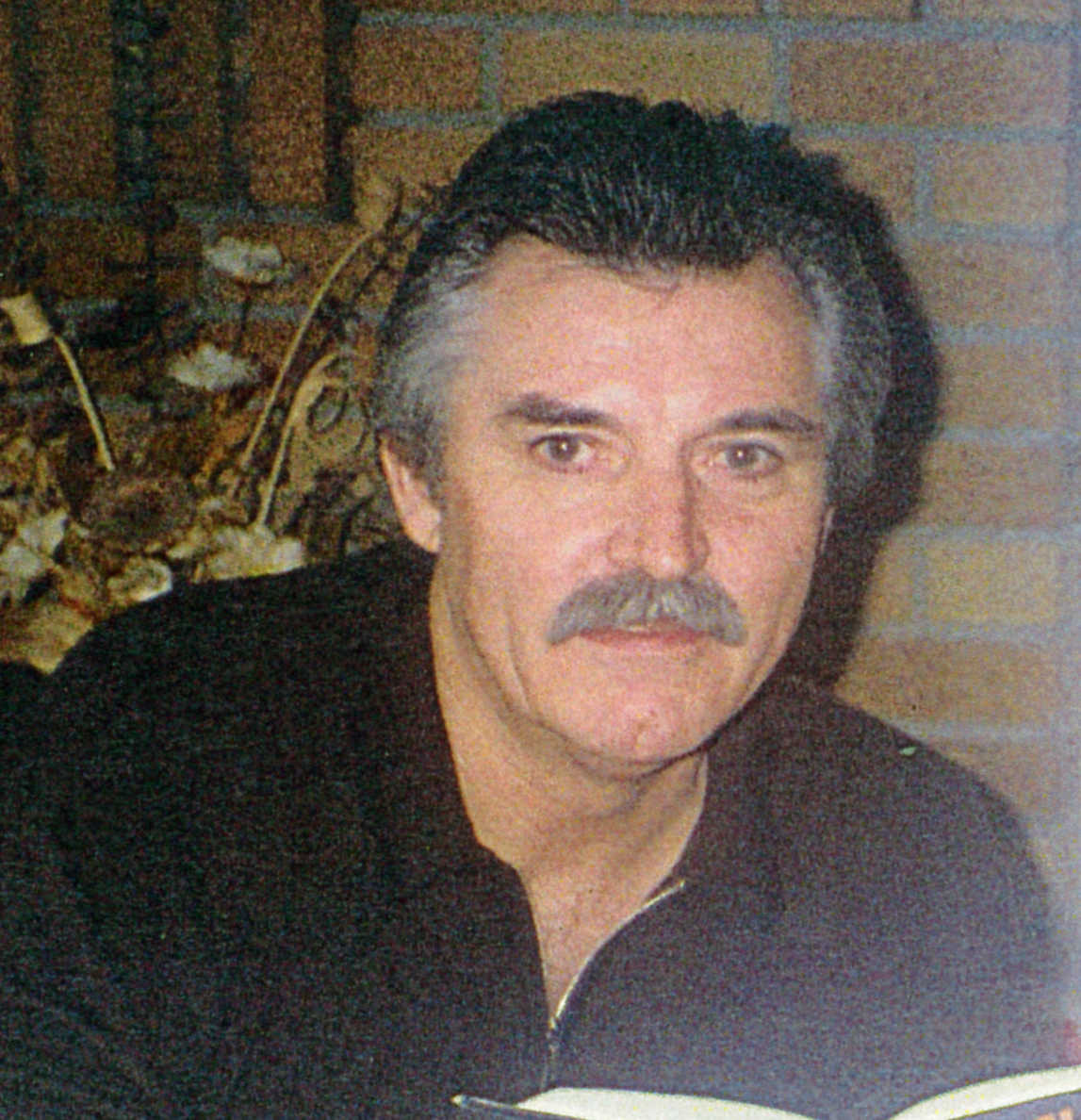
- Brian Vallée at book signing, 1998.
- Born: Brian Michael Vallée; 1940; Sault Ste. Marie, Ontario, Canada
- Died: July 22, 2011 (aged 70–71); Toronto, Ontario, Canada
- Education: Michigan State University
- Occupations: writer, journalist, television producer
- Writing career
- Genres: non-fiction, Canadian literature, fiction
- Notable work: Life With Billy
- Website: www.brianvallee.ca

Brian Michael Vallée (1940–2011) was a Canadian author, journalist, documentary film producer, screenwriter, and public speaker. He is best known for his work reflecting on domestic violence and his role with CBC's award-winning documentary program The Fifth Estate. His first non-fiction book, Life With Billy focused on the life of Jane Hurshman, an abused wife whose legal case resulted in battered wife syndrome becoming a legal defense in Canadian courts.

== Life and career ==
Brian Michael Vallée was born in Sault Ste. Marie, Ontario, in 1940. Vallée got his start in journalism as a staff writer for his hometown paper The Sault Star, where he reported on local news from the fall of 1962 until the spring of 1970. In 1967, he graduated from Michigan State University with a B.A. in journalism. In the spring of 1970 he began work as a reporter for the Windsor Star. In 1974, he moved to Toronto and began working at the Toronto Sun where he was employed for 14 months. As a journalist he worked for newspapers in England, the United States, and Canada.

In 1978, he went on to work for ten years as a producer with the CBC's documentary program The Fifth Estate.

In 2005, he and fellow Sault Ste. Marie-native Les Payette founded West End Books, a small publishing company named for the part of the city where both grew up.

In 2010, he donated his records to Algoma University in Sault Ste. Marie.

Vallée died on July 22, 2011, in St. Michael's Hospital, Toronto.

== Awards and honours ==
Vallée's work has received considerable critical acclaim. A television movie based on his Life With Billy book won three Gemini Awards in 1995. Two of his CBC documentaries won ACTRA Awards for the fifth estate and he was an associate producer for the one-hour documentary Cruel Camera, which won an Audubon Society award. In 2012, he was inducted into the Sault Ste Marie, Ontario Walk of Fame.

== Advocacy ==
Brian Vallée was a long time advocate for awareness around domestic violence. Some of his most notable works including Life with Billy, Life After Billy, and The War on Women all focus on bringing the issue of domestic abuse and battered women to the forefront of Canadian consciousness. Many of Vallée's speaking engagements, conference talks, and documentary projects focused on battered women and the need for increased public awareness about the lives of women living with abuse.

His 2011 obituary requested that voluntary donations be made to Women in Crisis (Algoma), a non-profit organization providing support services for women experiencing abuse and violence.

== Works ==
=== Literary ===
- Life With Billy (1986) ISBN 0-7704-2239-X
- Un Femme en Enfer (1986) ISBN 2-7242-4303-X
- Pariah (1991) ISBN 0-7704-2351-5
- Life After Billy (1995) ISBN 0-770-42622-0
- Edwin Alonzo Boyd: The Story of the Notorious Boyd Gang (1997) ISBN 978-0-385-25657-5
- The Torso Murder: The Untold Story of Evelyn Dick (2001) ISBN 1-55263-340-3
- The War on Women (book) (2007) ISBN 1-55263-828-6

=== Television and film ===
- Just Another Missing Kid Associate producer (1982, went on to win an Academy Award)
- Life with Billy Writer (1994 Canadian television film, winner of three Gemini Awards)
- Behind the Mask series (1998 Life and Times (TV series) documentary on artist Ken Danby)
- Unmaking the Myth: The Life and Times of Edwin Alonzo Boyd (2002)
- The Notorious Mrs. Dick Writer and researcher (2002 TV documentary)
- Prince of Pot: The U.S. vs. Marc Emery Researcher (2007)
