= Mountaineering on Mount Kenya =

Climbing Kenya's highest mountain

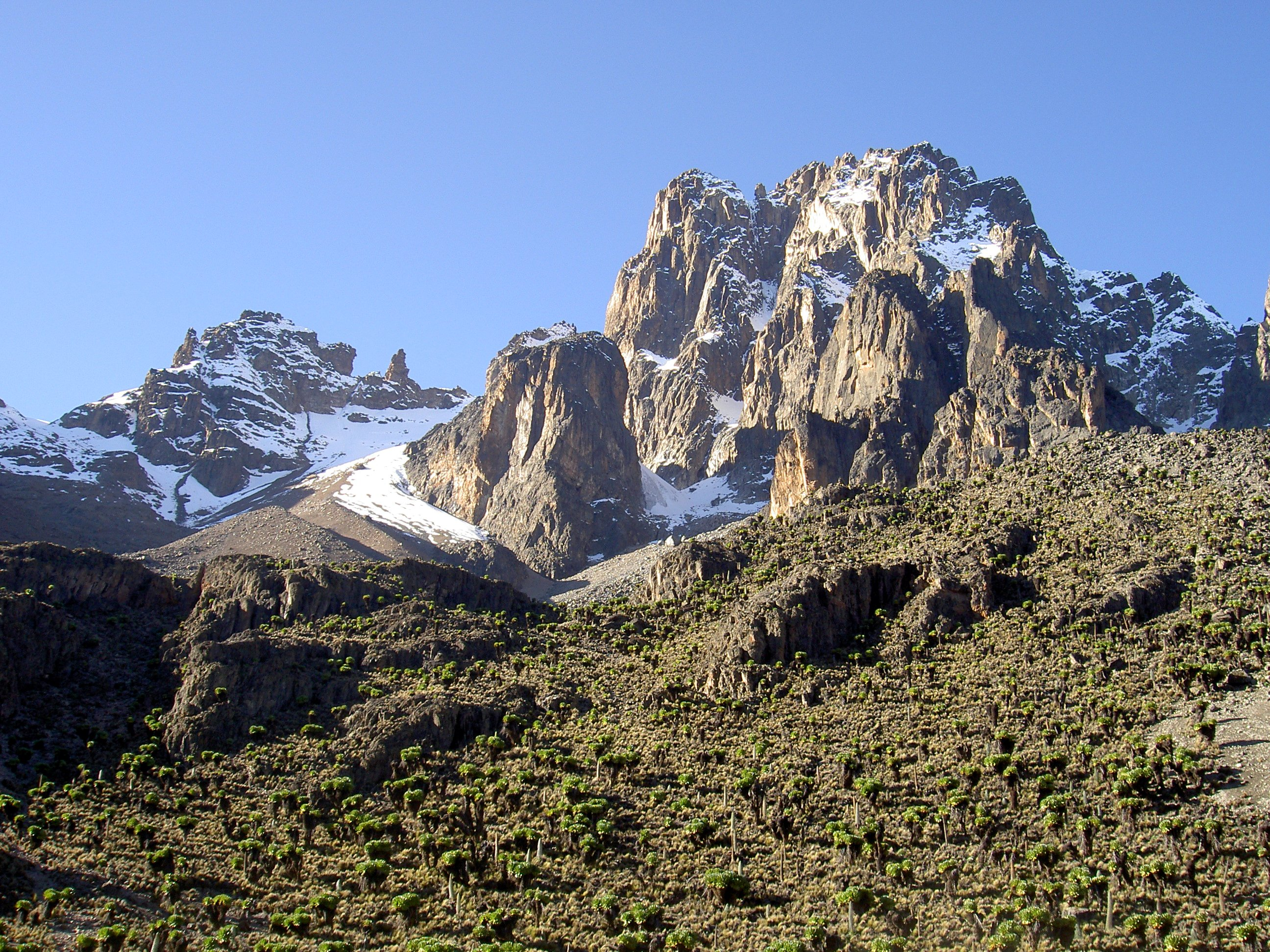
The central peaks of Mount Kenya are volcanic plugs that have resisted glacial erosion. (Left to right: Point Thompson (4955m), Batian (5199m) and Nelion (5188m))

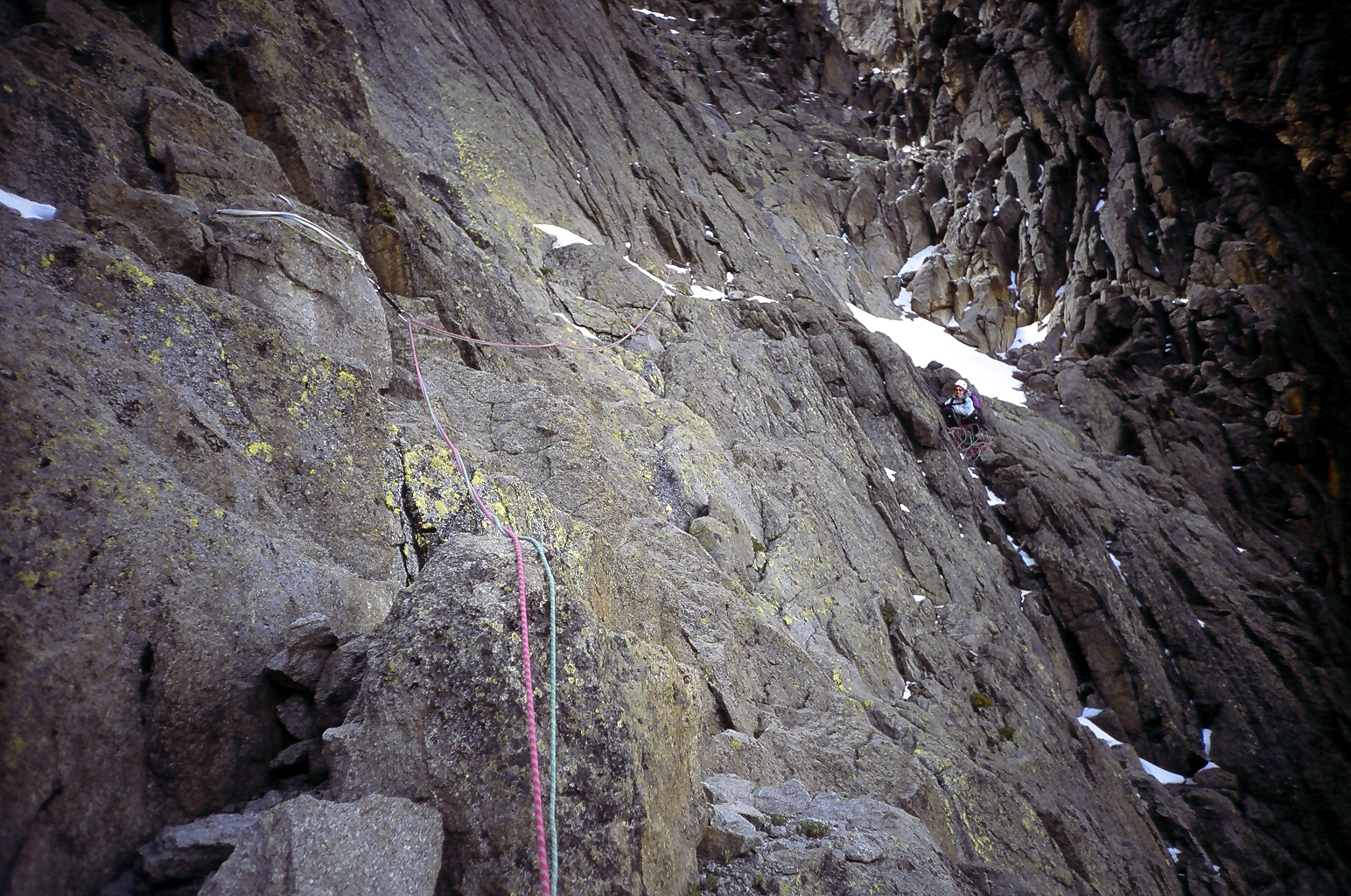
There are many peaks on Mount Kenya which require rock climbing.

Most of the peaks on Mount Kenya have been summited. The majority of these involve rock climbing as the easiest route, although some only require a scramble or a walk. The highest peak that can be ascended without climbing is Point Lenana, 4,985 metres (16,355 ft). The majority of the 15,000 visitors to the national park each year climb this peak. In contrast, approximately 200 people summit Nelion and 50 summit Batian, the two highest peaks.

Mount Kenya's climbing seasons are unique as a result of its location only 10 miles from the equator. During the northern summer the rock routes on the north side of the peak are in good summer condition, while at the same time the ice routes on the south side of the peak are prime shape. The situation is reversed during the southern summer. The two seasons are separated by several months of rainy season before and after, during which climbing conditions are generally unfavorable.

== Walking routes ==
Map showing the walking routes and huts around Mount Kenya

There are eight walking routes up to the main peaks. Starting clockwise from the north these are the: Meru, Chogoria, Kamweti, Naro Moru, Burguret, Sirimon and Timau Routes. Of these Chogoria, Naro Moru and Sirimon and used most frequently and therefore have staffed gates. The other routes require special permission from the Kenya Wildlife Service to use.

=== Meru Route ===
This route leads from Katheri, south of Meru, to Lake Rotundu following the Kathita Munyi river. It does not lead to the peaks, but up onto the alpine moorland on the slopes of the mountain.

=== Chogoria Route ===
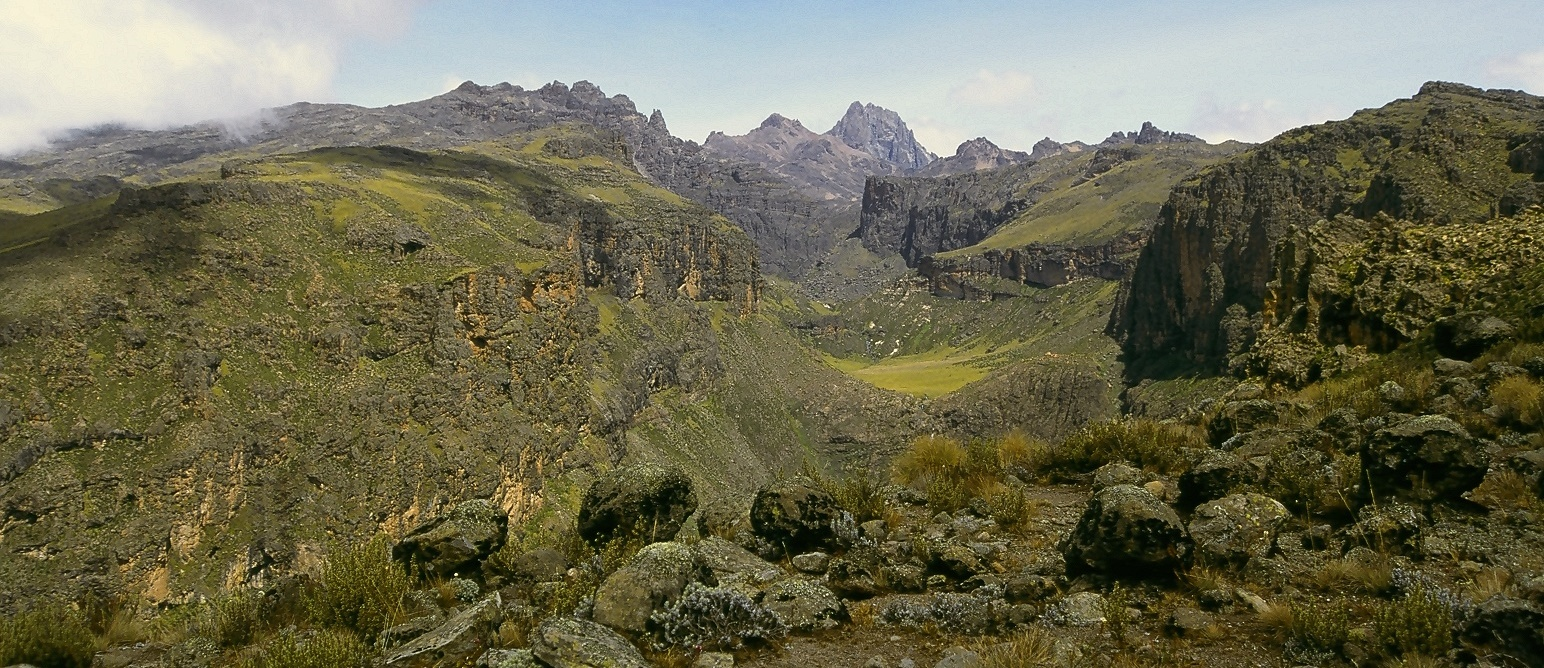
The Gorges Valley is a major feature on the Chogoria Route.

This route leads from Chogoria town up to the peaks circuit. The 32 kilometres (20 mi) from the forest gate to the park gate are often done by vehicle, but it is also possible to walk. There is much wildlife in the forest, with safari ant columns crossing the track, monkeys in the trees, and the potential for seeing elephant, buffalo and leopard. The road is not in good condition, and requires careful driving and walking. Near the park gate the bamboo zone starts, with grasses growing to 12 metres (39 ft) high.

Once in the park the track passes through rosewood forests, with lichens hanging from the branches. At one point the path splits, with the smaller track leading to a path up the nearby Mugi Hill and across to Lake Ellis.

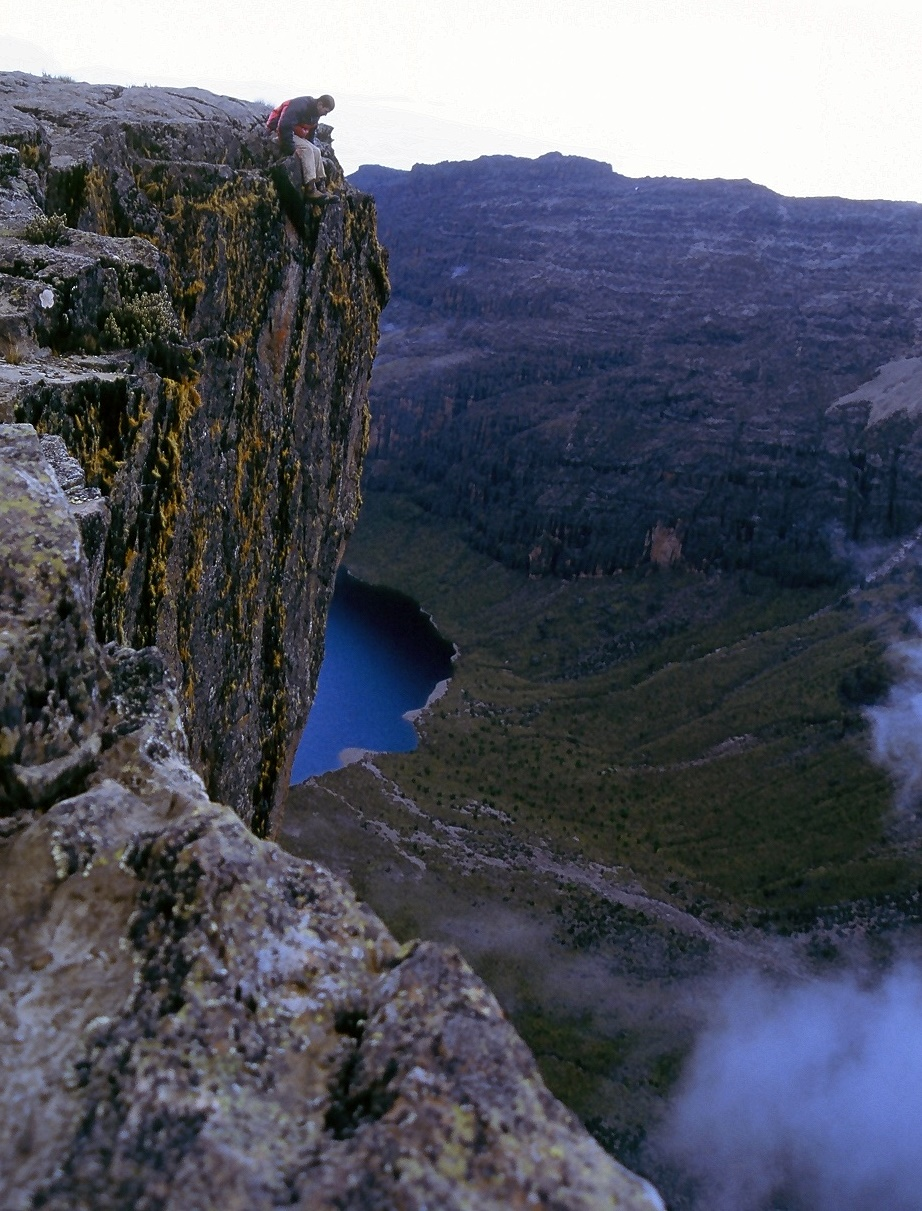
Top of large overhanging buttress overlooking Lake Michaelson, close to Hall Tarns.

Near the trackhead a small bridge crosses the Nithi stream. (Following the stream down-river a few hundred metres leads to The Gates Waterfall.) The path heads up a ridge above the Gorges Valley, with views to the peaks, Lake Michaelson, The Temple, and across the valley to Delamere and Macmillan Peaks. Hall Tarns are situated right on the path and above a 200 metres (660 ft) cliff directly above Lake Michaelson.

As the path carries on it crosses the flat head of the Nithi River and then the slope steepens. The path splits, heading west to Simba Col, and south west to Square Tarn. These are both on the Peak Circuit Route.

=== Kamweti Route ===
This is the longest route in to the peaks and follows the Nyamindi West River. It is a restricted route, but is still used occasionally.

=== Naro Moru Route ===
This route is taken by many of the trekkers who try to reach Point Lenana. It can be ascended in only 3 days and has bunkhouses at each camp so a tent is not necessary.

The terrain is usually good, although one section is called the Vertical Bog.

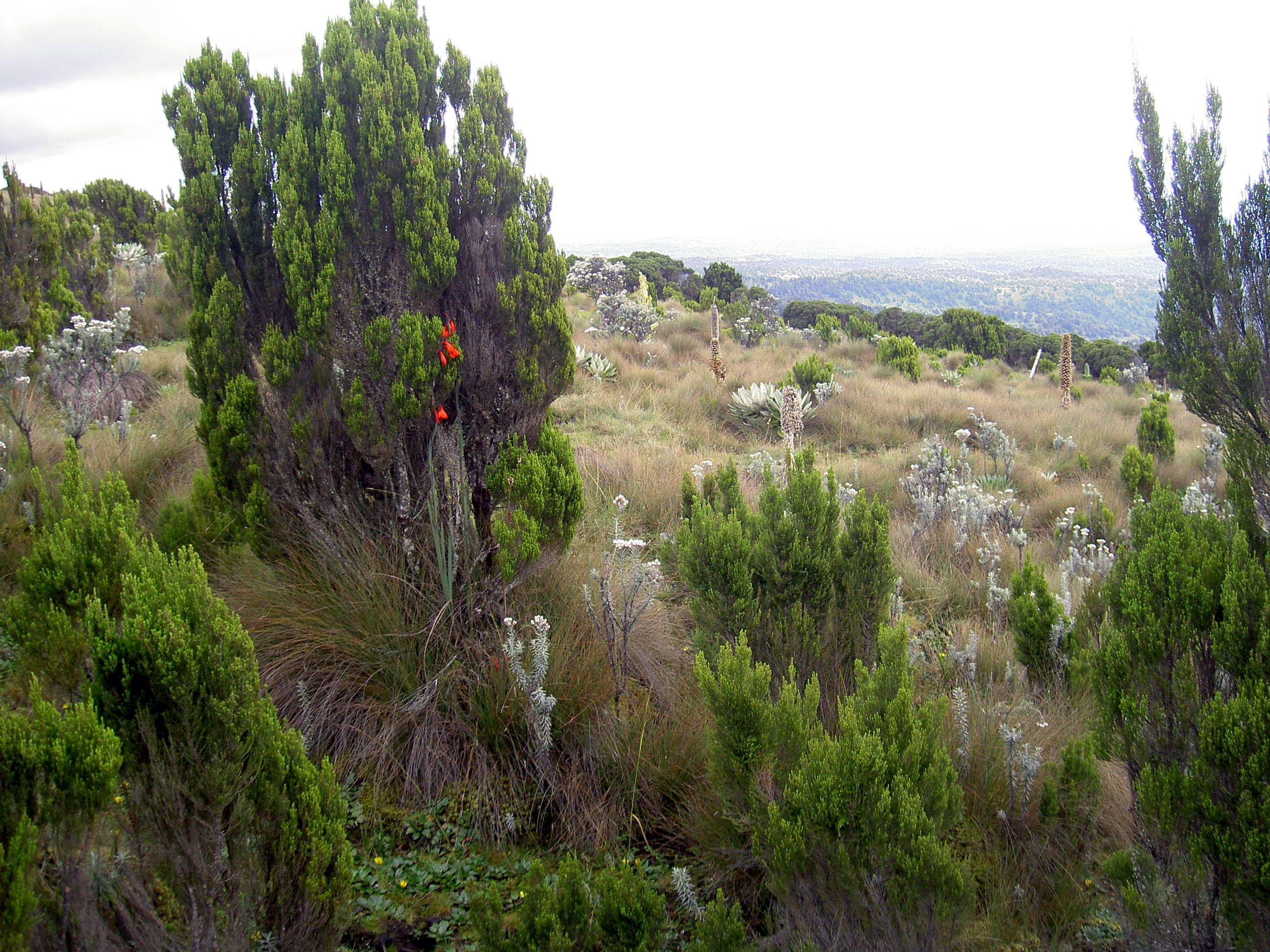
Vertical bog on Mount Kenya on the Naro Moru Route

The track starts in Naro Moru town and heads past the Park Headquarters up the ridge between the Northern and Southern Naro Moru Rivers. At the roadhead is the Meteorological Station, to which it is possible to drive in the dry season. The route drops down into the Northern Naro Moru Valley to Mackinder's Camp on the Peak Circuit Path.

=== Gathiuru Route ===
It starts in Gathiuru, and mainly follows the North Burguret River, then continues up to Hut Tarn on the Peak Circuit Path. It is the shortest route to Peak Lenana. It is managed by the Gathiuru Community Forest Association. The locals in the areas have for a long time suffered human-wildlife conflict. They had to wake up to the reality that God has endowed them with a great mountain and wildlife from which they can earn a living. They came together and formed the Gathiuru Community Forest Association which was aimed at conserving the two great natural resources as they make a living. To access the route tourists will have to pass through the Mt Kenya Royal Cottages for payment and facilitation. This is a lodge situated opposite the Nanyuki airstrip and has entered into a partnership with the association to help market the route for the locals so that the community benefits. The Gathiuru Route boasts of great fauna and flora, wildlife and great scenery.

=== Sirimon Route ===
This route starts 15 km (9.3 mi) east around the Mount Kenya Ring Road from Nanyuki. The gate is 10 km (6.2 mi) further along the track, which can be walked or driven by four-wheel drives.

The track climbs up through the forest. On the northern side of the mountain there is no bamboo zone, so the forest gradually turns into moorland covered with giant heather. The track ends at Old Moses Camp and becomes a path. This continues up the hill before splitting into two routes. To the left, the least used path goes around the side of the Barrow, to Likii North Hut. The vegetation becomes more sparse, with giant lobelia and groundsels dotted around. The path climbs over a ridge, before rejoining the main path ascending the Mackinder Valley. Shipton's Cave can be found in the rock wall to the left of the steep path just before reaching Shipton's Camp.

From Shipton's Camp, it is possible to ascend the ridge directly in front of the camp to the site of Kami Hut, which no longer exists, or follow the river up to Lower Simba Tarn and eventually to Simba Col. These are both on the Peak Circuit Path.

=== Timau Route ===
This is a restricted route. It starts very close to the Sirimon Route, at Timau Village, and skirts around the edge of the forest for a considerable distance. It used to lead to the highest point on the mountain to which it was possible to drive, but has not been used for many years. From the trackhead it is possible to reach Halls Tarns in a few hours, then follow the Chogoria Route to the Peak Circuit Path.

=== Peak Circuit Path ===
This is a path around the main peaks, with a distance of about 10 kilometres (6 mi) and height gain and loss of over 2,000 metres (6,600 ft). It can be walked in one day, but more commonly takes two or three. It can also be used to join different ascent and descent routes. The route does not require technical climbing.

== Climbing routes ==
Most of the peaks on Mount Kenya have been summited. The majority of these involve rock climbing as the easiest route. The grades given are UIAA alpine climbing grades.

Peak	Altitude	Route Name	Grade	Climbing Season*	First Ascent
Batian	5,199 metres (17,057 ft)	North Face Standard Route	IV+	Summer	A.H. Firmin and P. Hicks, 31 July 1944
Batian	5,199 metres (17,057 ft)	South-West Ridge Route	IV	Winter	A.H. Firmin and J.W. Howard, 8 January 1946
Nelion	5,188 metres (17,021 ft)	Normal Route	IV−	Summer/Winter	E.E. Shipton and P.W. Harris 6 January 1929
Batian/Nelion	-	Ice Window Route	V−	Summer	P. Snyder, Y. Laulan and B. LeDain 20 August 1974
Batian/Nelion	-	Diamond Couloir	VI	Summer	P. Snyder and T. Mathenge 4–5 October 1973
Pt Pigott	4,957 metres (16,263 ft)	South Ridge	III+	Summer/Winter	W.M. and R.J.H. Chambers February 1959
Thomson's Flake	4,947 metres (16,230 ft)	Thomson's Flake	VI	Summer/Winter	L. Herncarek, W. Welsch and B. Cliff 9 September 1962
Pt Dutton	4,885 metres (16,027 ft)	North-East Face and Ridge	IV	Summer/Winter	S. Barusso and R.D. Metcalf 4 August 1966
Pt John	4,883 metres (16,020 ft)	South-East Gully	III	Summer	E.E. Shipton and R.E.G. Russel 18 December 1929
Pt Melhuish	4,880 metres (16,010 ft)	South-East Face	IV+	Summer/Winter	R.M.Kamke and W.M. Boyes December 1960
Pt Peter	4757 m (15,607 ft)	North-East Gully and Ridge	III	Summer/Winter	E.E. Shipton and H.W. Tilman July 1960
Pt Peter	4757 m (15,607 ft)	Window Ridge	VI, A1	Summer/Winter	F.A. Wedgewood and H.G. Nicol 8 August 1963
Midget Peak	4,700 metres (15,420 ft)	South Gully	IV	Summer/Winter	E.E. Shipton and H.W. Tilman August 1930

* Climbing Season refers to northern hemisphere summers and winters.

== Huts ==
Caretakers are present at most huts, but not all.

The huts range from very basic (Liki North) with little more than a roof, to luxurious with log fires and running water (Meru Mt Kenya Lodge). Most huts have no heat or light, but are spacious with dormitories and communal areas. They also offer separate accommodation for porters and guides. The communal areas of the huts can be used by campers wishing to retreat from the weather or to store food away from the hyaena and hyraxes.

=== Around the Peak Circuit Path ===
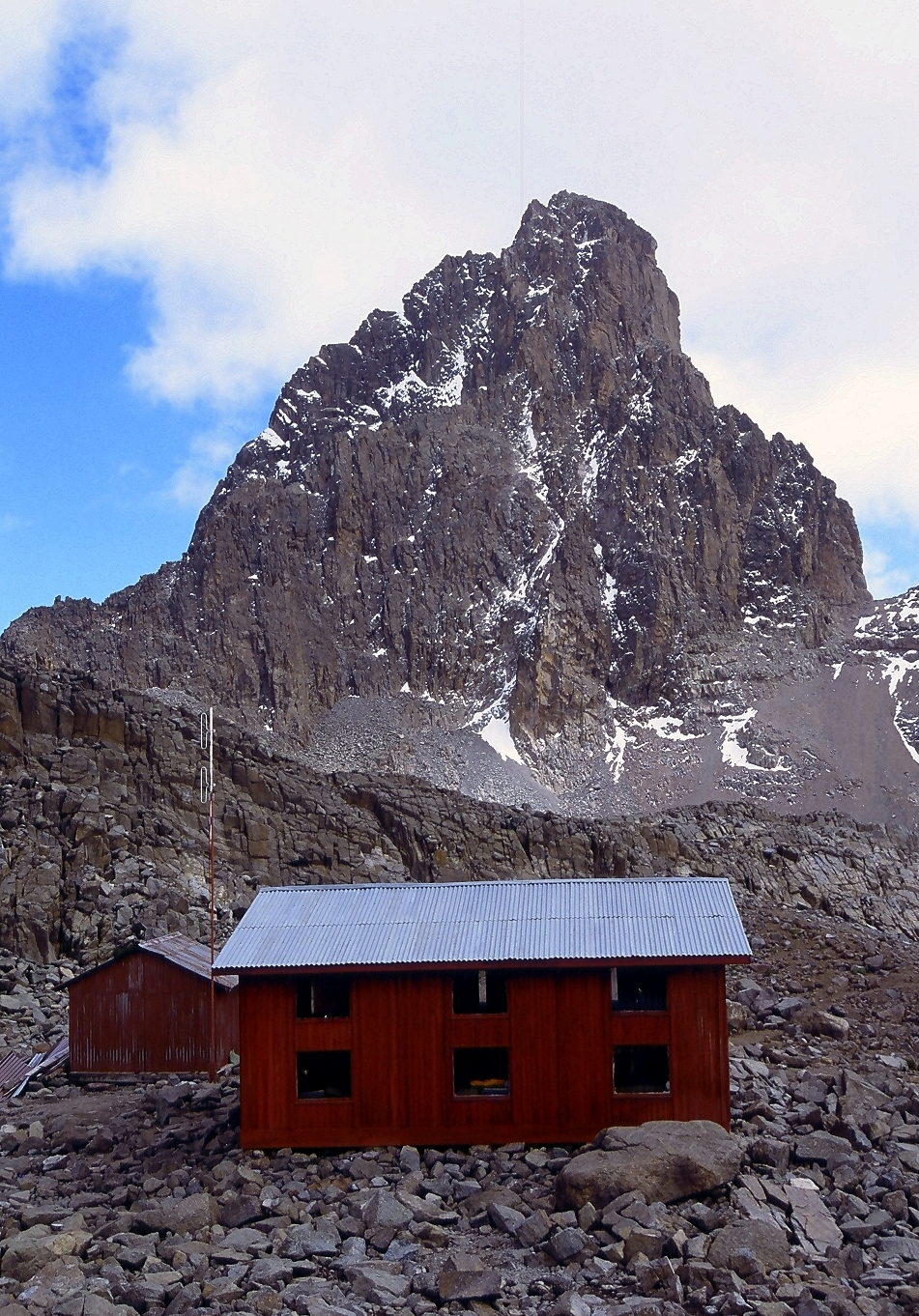
A view of the Austrian Hut on Mt Kenya with Nelion (5,188 metres (17,021 ft)) in the background. The Normal Route up Nelion can be seen, but is not highlighted.

- Austrian Hut/Top Hut (4,790 metres (15,715 ft))

Austrian Hut is the highest hut on Mount Kenya, with the exception of Howell Hut on Nelion. It is a good base for the ascent of Lenana, or for exploring the surrounding area. Peaks that can be ascended with Austrian Hut as a base camp include Point Thompson, Point Melhuish and Point John. It is also the starting point for the Normal Route up Nelion, as well as other routes up to the summits.
The hut was built with Austrian funding, following the rescue of Gerd Judmeier.

- Two Tarn Hut (4,490 metres (14,731 ft))

Two Tarn Hut is located on Two Tarn Col beside a lake. It is often used before ascending Batian from the southern and western routes.

- Kami Hut (site of) (4,439 metres (14,564 ft))

Kami Hut was constructed in 1963 and was used by climbers of the north face of Batian until the local Kami Tarn became too polluted.

=== Huts on Chogoria Route ===
- Meru Mt Kenya Lodge (3,017 metres (9,898 ft))

This is a privately owned lodge on the edge of the national park. Park fees have to be paid. The lodge is about 500 m from the park gate, and consists of several log cabins, each with a bedroom, kitchen, bathroom and living area with log fireplace. There is hot running water in the cabins, which sleep 3–4 people. The campsite is located at the park gate, and has running water.

- Urumandi Hut (site of) (3,063 metres (10,049 ft))

This hut was built in 1923 and is no longer used.

- Minto's Hut (porters only) (4,290 metres (14,075 ft))

Minto's Hut sleeps 8 porters, and is situated near Hall Tarns. There is a campsite nearby. Water is taken directly from the tarns. The tarns have no outflow and so the stagnant water needs to be filtered or boiled before use.

=== Huts on Naro Moru Route ===
- The Warden's Cottage (2,400 metres (7,874 ft))

This was home to the park's senior wardens until 1998. There are two bedrooms, a bathroom, a kitchen and a living area with veranda and log fire. There is running hot water. The cottage is inside the national park, so park fees must be paid.

- Meteorological Station (3,050 metres (10,007 ft))

The Met Station is administered by Naro Moru Lodge. There are several bunkhouses here as well as a campsite.

- Mackinder's Camp (4,200 metres (13,780 ft))

Mackinder's Camp is also administered by Naro Moru Lodge. There is a large bunkhouse and plenty of space for camping.

=== Huts on Sirimon Route ===
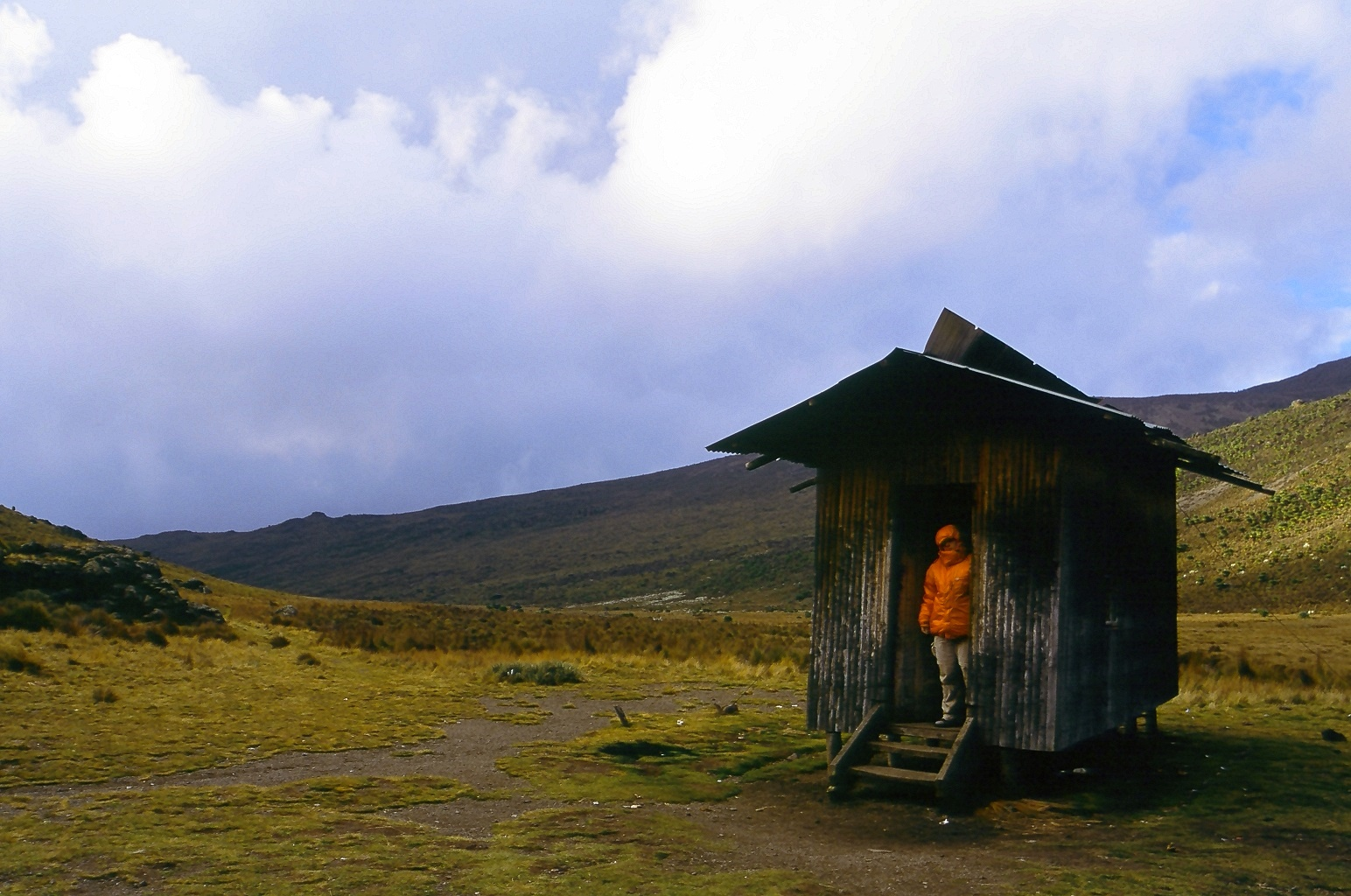
Likii North Hut is a small bothy that sleeps eight and provides little more than shelter.

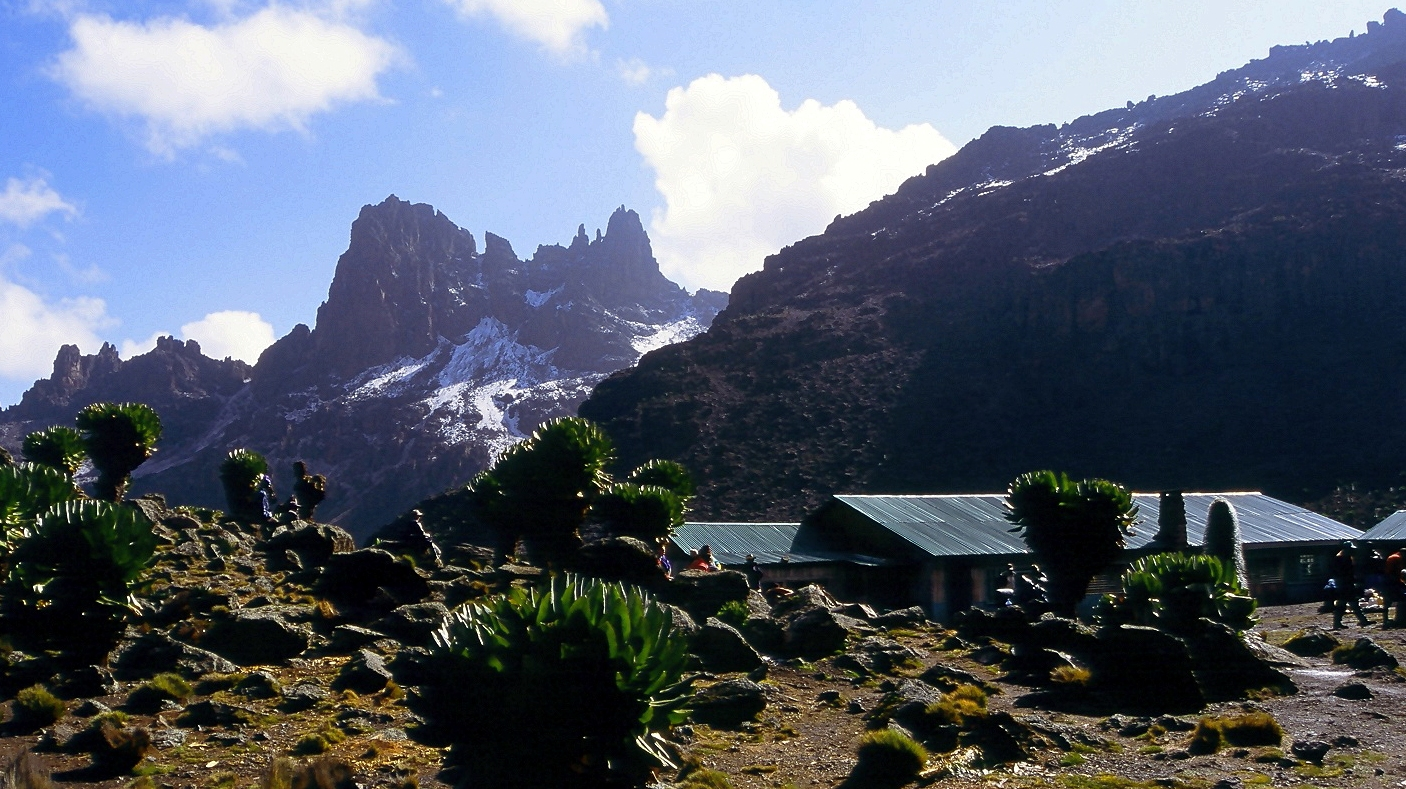
Shipton's Camp is one of the larger huts on the mountain. It is close to the little climbed Terere and Sendeyo, which are seen in the background.

- Sirimon Bandas (2,650 metres (8,694 ft))

Sirimon Bandas are located at Sirimon Gate, just inside Mt Kenya National Park. The bandas each have two bedrooms, a kitchen, a dining room, a bathroom and a veranda. There is hot running water. The surrounding area contains much wildlife, including hyaena, zebra, many antelope, baboons and many species of birds. Park fees have to be paid, although the bandas are situated just outside the gates.
There is a campsite next to the bandas, with running water and long drops.

- Old Moses Camp (3,400 metres (11,155 ft))

Old Moses Camp is administered by Bantu Utamaduni Lodge. It has dormitories and a large campsite, as well as accommodation for guides and porters.

- Liki North Hut (3,993 metres (13,100 ft))

Liki North Hut was little more than a shed to keep the weather off, but now it has lost its roof so provides no shelter any more. However there is space to camp, a basic toilet and a river nearby for water. It is on the lesser used path between Old Moses and Shipton's Camps and can by used as a base for climbing Terere and Sendeyo or to stop off on the way to Shipton's Camp.

- Shipton's Camp (4,236 metres (13,898 ft))

Shipton's Camp is administered by Bantu Utamaduni Lodge. It is home to many rock hyrax, as well as striped mice, many types of sunbirds and Alpine Chats. Mountain Buzzards fly overhead. The vegetation is dominated by giant groundsel, but there are many flowers and lobelia as well. On the skyline is a view of Points Peter and Dutton, with Batian overshadowing them. Also in view are Thompson's Flake and Point Thompson, with Point Lenana on the other side of the Gregory Glacier. In front of the main peaks is the Krapf Rognon, with the Krapf Glacier behind.

=== Huts on Nelion ===
- Howell Hut (5,188 metres (17,021 ft))

This hut, on top of Nelion, was built by Ian Howell in February 1970. The corrugated iron for the hut was dropped onto the Lewis Glacier by helicopter; Howell then carried it to the summit in thirteen solo ascents and built the hut.

=== Other huts around the mountain ===
- Bantu Utamaduni Lodge

The lodge is situated north of Naro Moru and offers rooms, tented accommodation and a campsite. It administers the Old Moses and Shipton's Camps on the Sirimon Route.

- Naro Moru River Lodge

This lodge is situated near Naro Moru, and offers facilities from bird watching to equipment hire and guided climbs of the mountain. It also administers the bunkhouses at the Met Station and Mackinder's Camp on the Naro Moru Route.

- The Serena Mountain Lodge

This luxury hotel is found on the western slopes of the mountain, at around 2,200 metres (7,200 ft). It has its own waterhole and offers guided walks, trout fishing and luxury climbs up the mountain, as well as conference facilities.

- Naro Moru Youth Hostel

The youth hostel is situated between Naro Moru and Naro Moru Gate, and is a renovated farmhouse. It has dormitories and a campsite, with hot water, a kitchen and equipment hire.

- Castle Forest Lodge

This lodge was built by the British in the late 1920s as a retreat for royalty. It is on the southern slopes of the mountain in the forest at about 2,100 metres (6,900 ft).

- Rutundu Log Cabins

This luxurious lodge is on the northern slopes of the mountain at about 3,100 metres (10,200 ft).

- Mount Kenya Royal Cottages

The lodge is situated opposite the Nanyuki airstrip. It is the official lodge for the Gathiuru Route.

== History ==
=== European sighting ===
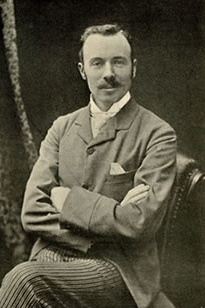
Joseph Thomson reached the foothills of Mount Kenya and confirmed Krapf's discovery.

The first European to report seeing Mount Kenya was Dr Johann Ludwig Krapf, a German missionary, from Kitui in 1849, a town 160 kilometres (100 mi) away from the mountain. The sighting was made on 3 December 1849, a year after the first sighting of Mount Kilimanjaro by a European.

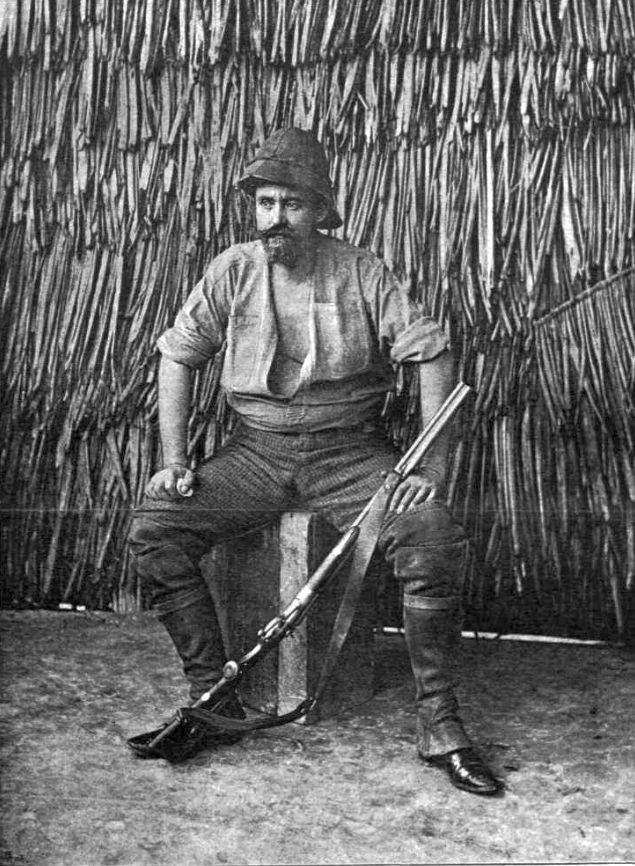
Count Sámuel Teleki was the first European to set foot on Mount Kenya. His expedition reached 4,350 metres (14,270 ft).

Dr Krapf also noted that the rivers flowing from Mt Kenya, and other mountains in the area, were continuously flowing. This was very different from the other rivers in the area, which swelled up in the wet season and completely dried up after the rainy season had ended. As the streams flowed even in the driest seasons he concluded that there must be a source of water up on the mountain, in the form of glaciers. He believed the mountain to be the source of the White Nile.

In 1851 Krapf returned to Kitui. He travelled 65 kilometres (40 mi) closer to the mountain, but did not see it again. In 1877 Hildebrandt was in the Kitui area and heard stories about the mountain, but also did not see it. Since there were no confirmations to back up Krapf's claim people began to be suspicious.

Eventually, in 1883, Joseph Thomson passed close by the west side of the mountain and confirmed Krapf's claim. He diverted his expedition and reached 1,737 metres (5,700 ft) up the slopes of the mountain but had to retreat because of trouble with local people. However, the first European exploration high onto the mountain was achieved in 1887 by Count Sámuel Teleki and Ludwig von Höhnel. He managed to reach 4,350 metres (14,270 ft) on the south western slopes. On this expedition they (mistakenly) believed they had found the crater of a volcano.

In 1892, Teleki and von Höhnel returned to the eastern side, but were unable to get through the forest.

Finally, in 1893, an expedition managed to ascend Mount Kenya as far as the glaciers. This expedition was travelling from the coast to Lake Baringo in the Rift Valley, and was led by Dr John W Gregory, a British geologist. They managed to ascend the mountain to around 4,730 metres (15,520 ft), and spent several hours on the Lewis Glacier with their guide. On his return to Britain, Gregory published papers and a narrative account of his achievements.

George Kolb, a German physician, made expeditions in 1894 and 1896 and was the first to reach the moorlands on the east side of the mountain. More exploration occurred after 1899 when the railway was completed as far as the site of Nairobi.

=== Mackinder's expedition ===
On 28 July 1899, Sir Halford John Mackinder set out from the site of Nairobi on an expedition to Mt Kenya. The members of the expedition consisted of 6 Europeans, 66 Swahilis, 2 tall Maasai guides and 96 Kikuyu. The Europeans were Campbell B. Hausberg, second in command and photographer, Douglas Saunders, botanist, C F Camburn, taxidermist, Cesar Ollier, guide, and Josef Brocherel, guide and porter.

The expedition made it as far as the mountain, but encountered many difficulties on the way. The country they passed through was full of plague and famine. Many Kikuyu porters tried to desert with women from the villages, and others stole from the villages, which made the chiefs very hostile towards the expedition. When they reached the base camp on 18 August, they could not find any food, had two of their party killed by the local people, and eventually had to send Saunders to Naivasha to get help from Captain Gorges, the Government Officer there.

Mackinder pushed on up the mountain, and established a camp at 3,142 metres (10,310 ft) in the Höhnel Valley. He made his first attempt on the summit on 30 August with Ollier and Brocherel up the south east face, but they had to retreat when they were within 100 metres (110 yd) of the summit of Nelion due to nightfall.

On 5 September, Hausberg, Ollier and Brocherel made a circuit of the main peaks looking for an easier route to the summit. They could not find one. On 11 September Ollier and Brocherel made an ascent of the Darwin Glacier, but were forced to retreat due to a blizzard.

When Saunders returned from Naivasha with the relief party, Mackinder had another attempt at the summit with Ollier and Brocherel. They traversed the Lewis Glacier and climbed the south east face of Nelion. They spent the night near the gendarme, and traversed the snowfield at the head of the Darwin Glacier at dawn before cutting steps across the Diamond Glacier. They reached the summit of Batian at noon on 13 September, and descended by the same route.

=== 1900–1980 ===
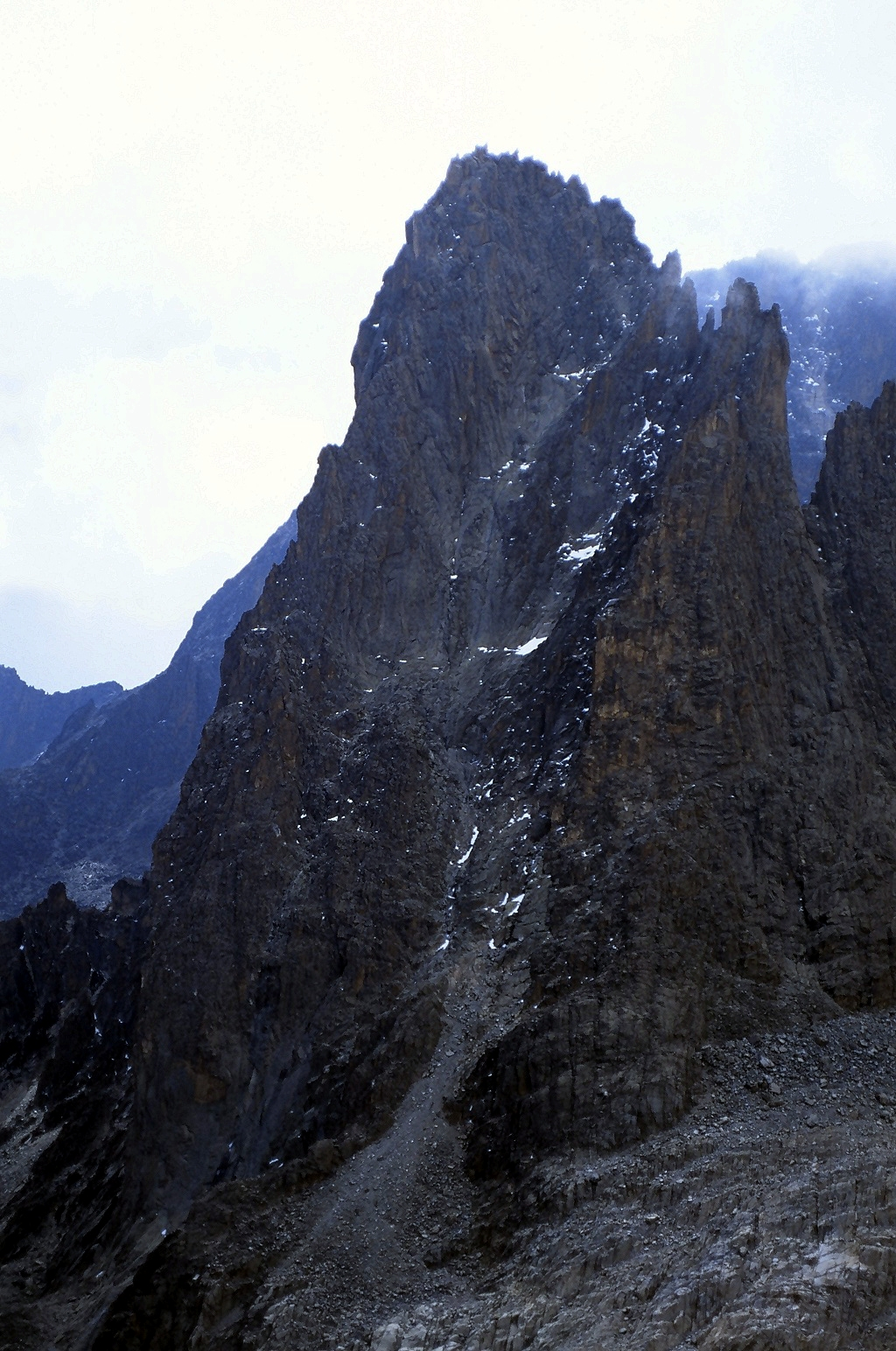
Shipton and Russell made the first ascent of Pt John up the south-east gully in 1929

After the first ascent of Mt Kenya there were initially only occasional attempts to climb it. The majority of the exploration until after the First World War was by settlers in Kenya. A Church of Scotland mission was set up in Chogoria, and several Scottish missionaries ascended to the peaks, including Rev Dr. J. W. Arthur, G. Dennis and A. R. Barlow. There were other ascents, but none succeeded in summitting Batian or Nelion.

New approach routes were cleared through the forest, which made access to the peaks area far easier. In 1920, Arthur and Sir Fowell Buxton tried to cut a route in from the south, and other routes came in from Nanyuki in the north, but the most commonly used route was that from the Chogoria mission in the east, built by Ernest Carr. Carr is also credited with building Urumandi and Top Huts.

It was not until 6 January 1929 that the first ascent of Nelion was made by Percy Wyn-Harris and Eric Shipton. They climbed the Normal Route, then descended to the Gate of Mists before ascending Batian. On 8 January they reascended, this time with G. A. Sommerfelt, and in December Shipton made another ascent with R. E. G. Russell. They also made the first ascent of Point John. During this year the Mountain Club of East Africa was formed.

At the end of July 1930, Shipton and Bill Tilman made the first traverse of the peaks. They ascended by the West Ridge of Batian, traversed the Gate of Mists to Nelion, and descended the Normal Route. During this trip, Shipton and Tilman made first ascents of several other peaks, including Point Peter, Point Dutton, Midget Peak, Point Pigott and either Terere or Sendeyo.

In the early 1930s there were several visits to the moorlands around Mt Kenya, with fewer as far as the peaks. Raymond Hook and Humphrey Slade ascended to map the mountain, and stocked several of the streams with trout. By 1938 there had been several more ascents of Nelion. In February Miss Carol W. Carroll and Ayub Mtu Muthara became the first woman and African respectively to ascend Nelion, in an expedition with Noel Symington, author of The Night Climbers of Cambridge, and on 5 March Miss Una Cameron became the first woman to ascend Batian.

During the Second World War there was another drop in ascents of the mountain. Perhaps the most notable of this period is that of three Italian Prisoners of War, who were being held in Nanyuki, and escaped to climb the mountain before returning to the camp and "escaping" back in. No Picnic on Mount Kenya tells the story of the prisoners' exploit.

In 1949 the Mountain Club of Kenya split from the Mountain Club of East Africa, and the area above 3,400 metres (11,150 ft) was designated a National Park. A road was built from Naro Moru to the moorlands allowing easier access.

Many new routes were climbed on Batian and Nelion in the next three decades, and in October 1959 the Mountain Club of Kenya produced their first guide to Mount Kenya and Kilimanjaro. On Kenyan Independence Day in 1963, Kisoi Munayo raised the Kenyan flag at the top of the mountain. He died in 2007 and was given a heroic funeral attended by the Kenyan president Mwai Kibaki. In the early 1970s the Mount Kenya National Park Mountain Rescue Team was formed, and by the end of the 1970s all major routes on the peaks had been climbed.

== See also ==
- Mount Kenya
- Mount Kenya National Park
- Natural history of Mount Kenya
