= Life with Billy =

1994 Canadian television drama film

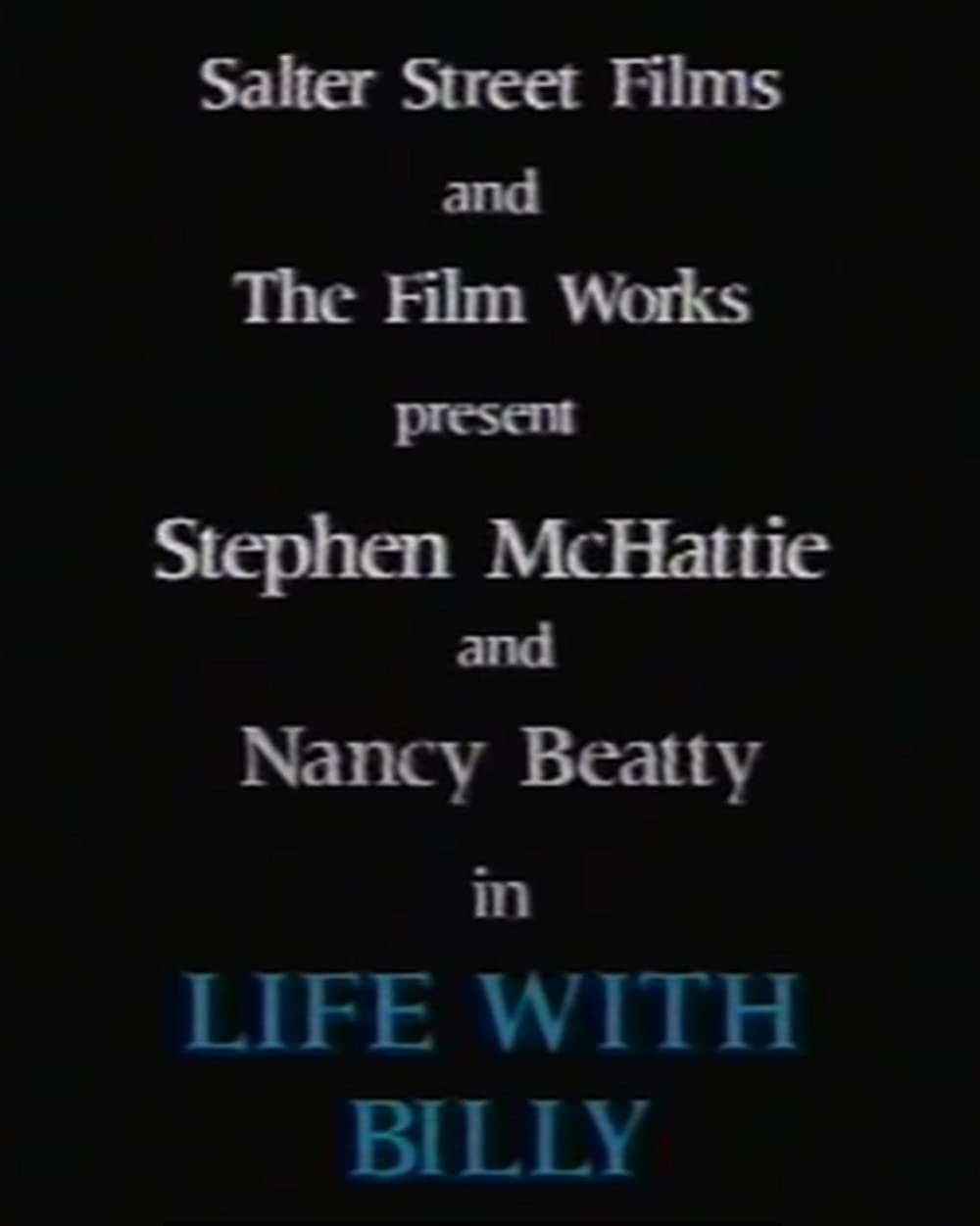
- Movie poster
- Genre: Drama
- Based on: Life with Billy by Brian Vallée
- Screenplay by: John Frizzell; Judith Thompson
- Directed by: Paul Donovan
- Starring: Stephen McHattie; Nancy Beatty; Ted Dykstra; Matthew Ferguson
- Theme music composer: Marty Simon
- Country of origin: Canada
- Original language: English

Production
- Producers: Michael Donovan; Eric Jordan; Alan MacGillivray; David M. York

Original release
- Network: Canadian Broadcasting Corporation
- Release: November 7, 1993

Life with Billy is a 1993 Canadian television film based on the non-fiction book of the same name by Brian Vallée. The film was nominated for five Gemini Awards, and won three.

The film begins with Jane Hurshman (Beatty) shooting her common-law husband Billy Stafford (McHattie) in his sleep, and then shows the resulting police investigation and trial, interspersed with flashbacks showing the domestic abuse that Stafford inflicted on Hurshman over the course of their relationship for 5 years.

== Cast ==
- Nancy Beatty as Jane Hurshman
- Stephen McHattie as Billy Stafford
- Deb Allen as Mandy
- Glenn Wadman as Ronnie Wamboldt
- Matthew Ferguson as Allan Whynot
- Joadi Newcomb as Dini Harrison
- Nancy Marshall as Bernice Wamboldt
- Tony Quinn as Cpl. Lawson
- Richard Donat as Constable Snow

== Awards ==
=== Won ===
- Gemini Award for Best Direction in a Dramatic Program or Mini-Series - Paul Donovan
- Gemini Award for Best Performance by an Actor in a Leading Role in a Dramatic Program or Mini-Series - Stephen McHattie
- Gemini Award for Best Performance by an Actress in a Leading Role in a Dramatic Program or Mini-Series - Nancy Beatty

=== Nominations ===
- Gemini Award for Best TV Movie - Eric Jordan & Michael Donovan
- Gemini Award for Best Writing in a Dramatic Program or Mini-Series - John Frizzell & Judith Thompson

== Read also ==
- Vallée, Brian (1998). Life and Death with Billy. Toronto: Seal Books. ISBN 0-7704-2818-5.
