= David Wiltse =

American dramatist

David Wiltse is an American novelist and playwright. He is the author of 12 novels, 14 plays and numerous screenplays and teleplays, including the CBS series "Ladies Man".

== Career ==
In 1986, his thriller Home Again was published by Macmillan Publishers.

In 2005, Wiltse's play A Marriage Minuet had its premiere at Florida Stage in Manalapan. The run was interrupted by Hurricane Wilma but continued after a brief hiatus.

== Selected works ==
=== Books ===
- Home Again (Macmillan; 1986)

=== Stage plays ===
- A Marriage Minuet (premiered at Florida Stage, Manalapan; 2005)
