= Citizen Gangster =

2013 Canadian film by Nathan Morlando

- Film poster
- Directed by: Nathan Morlando
- Written by: Nathan Morlando
- Produced by: Daniel Bekerman; Allison Black; Helen Du Toit
- Starring: Scott Speedman; Kelly Reilly; Kevin Durand; Joseph Cross
- Cinematography: Steve Cosens
- Edited by: Richard Comeau
- Music by: Max Richter
- Production company: Euclid 431 Pictures
- Distributed by: Entertainment One
- Release date: 10 September 2011 (TIFF)
- Running time: 105 minutes
- Country: Canada
- Language: English

Citizen Gangster is a 2011 Canadian biographical drama film directed and written by Nathan Morlando. Scott Speedman stars as Canadian gangster and alleged murderer Edwin Alonzo Boyd.

The film originally premiered at the 2011 Toronto International Film Festival under the title Edwin Boyd, but was retitled Citizen Gangster in general release.

== Plot ==
A veteran of World War II, Edwin Boyd (Scott Speedman) is disillusioned and barely getting by as a Toronto bus driver. With his wife Doreen (Kelly Reilly), whom he met in England during the war, and two young children to support, he finds it increasingly difficult to make ends meet. Adding to his dissatisfaction, Boyd has deep, unfulfilled dreams of making it as a star in Hollywood, a desire frowned upon by his retired policeman father (Brian Cox).

In a moment of desperation, Boyd grabs an old pistol, disguises his face with theatrical grease paint, and goes out to rob a bank; this sets off a series of events leading to one of Canada’s most infamous crime sprees.

Boyd forms a gang, known as the 'Boyd Gang', which includes Lenny Jackson (Kevin Durand), Ann Roberts (Melanie Scrofano), and Val Kozak (Joseph Cross). Jackson is also a veteran of WWII, and with his muscular build is the picture of a hardened criminal. There is an uneasy relationship between him and Boyd, given the attention lavished on the latter by the media; yet the two of them, both war vets, have a deep, unspoken brotherly bond. Val Kozak (Joseph Cross) is in a similar bind as Boyd, with a young wife and a desperate need to support his family. But he also has an affair with Mary Mitchell (Charlotte Sullivan), a fur-coat-wearing, flashy blonde party girl, whose flamboyant facade reveals a woman with past hurts and a deep-seated need for love and attention.

The foil to the gang’s mayhem is Detective Rhys (William Mapother). A somber family man who takes his work seriously, Rhys is the face of law enforcement in the movie, constantly on the gang’s trail.

Boyd's marriage grows increasingly strained. Despite the fact that Boyd’s initial motivation was a bid to provide for his young family and prove himself as a man, the nature of his lifestyle proves too much for her to handle.

== Cast ==
- Scott Speedman as Edwin Boyd
- Kelly Reilly as Doreen Boyd
- Kevin Durand as Lenny Jackson
- Joseph Cross as Val Kozak
- Brendan Fletcher as Willie 'The Clown' Jackson
- Charlotte Sullivan as Mary Mitchell
- Melanie Scrofano as Ann Roberts
- Brian Cox as Glover
- William Mapother as Detective David Rhys
- Christian Martyn as Billy Boyd
- Steven McCarthy as Jail Reporter

== Production ==
Filming began February 17, 2011, in Sault Ste. Marie, Ontario.

== Release ==
Citizen Gangster premiered at the 2011 Toronto International Film Festival. IFC Films distributed it in the United States.

== Reception ==
As of June 2020, the film holds a 53% approval rating on Rotten Tomatoes, a review aggregator, based on 15 reviews with an average rating of 5.5 out of 10. Metacritic rated it 56/100 based on 9 reviews. Linda Barnard of the Toronto Star rated it 3/4 stars called it a "carefully crafted, sympathetic examination of Canada's most notorious bank robber". Joe Leydon of Variety called it "generally low-key but sporadically exciting". Jeannette Catsoulis of The New York Times wrote, "Citizen Gangster is a good-looking but passionless affair that remains stubbornly aloof from its audience." Gary Goldstein of the Los Angeles Times called it a stylish but overly familiar film whose main draw is Speedman's performance.

The film won the award for Best Canadian First Feature Film at the 2011 Toronto International Film Festival.

The film garnered three Genie Award nominations at the 2012 Genie Awards: Best Actor (Speedman), Best Supporting Actor (Durand) and Best Supporting Actress (Sullivan).
