= Edwin Alonzo Boyd =

20th-century Canadian bank robber and leader of the Boyd Gang

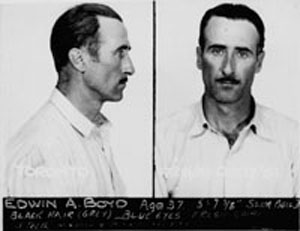
- Boyd in 1952
- Born: April 2, 1914; Toronto, Ontario, Canada
- Died: May 17, 2002 (aged 88); British Columbia, Canada
- Occupations: Infantryman, actor, bus driver
- Spouse: Doreen
- Children: 3
- Status: Deceased
- Allegiance: Boyd Gang
- Conviction: Bank robbery
- Penalty: Eight life sentences

Edwin Alonzo Boyd (April 2, 1914 – May 17, 2002) was a Canadian bank robber and leader of the Boyd Gang. His career made him a notorious Canadian folk hero.

== Early life ==
Edwin Alonzo Boyd was born on April 2, 1914, four months before the British Empire, of which Canada was part, entered World War I. His father, Glover Boyd, joined the army in August 1915 and did not return home from the war until a few years later. The apartment the family lived in was then too small, so they soon moved to a duplex on Bee Street in Todmorden, an area beyond the Don Valley, in East York.

Soon after, Edwin's mother Eleanor became pregnant again, so Glover Boyd took a job at the Toronto Police Department. Edwin was enrolled in school in the year 1921–22 , but due to an incident there, he did not remain for very long and during his first year of schooling his family had moved again. He then switched to Gledhill Public School to finish out the semester. In September 1923, Glover moved the family a few blocks north and Ed switched to Secord Public School for a brief period of time before being transferred back to Gledhill Public School.

The Boyds soon moved again, this time to Glebemount Avenue, and Boyd transferred to yet another new school, this time to Earl Beatty Public School, and it was here that Boyd became more of his own person, joining the school's soccer team so that for years his picture hung in the hall of the school. Boyd also then joined the YMCA marching band where he mastered the mouth organ and accompanied the band when they won a world championship at the Canadian National Exhibition.

In early 1930, his brothers, Gord and Norm Boyd, contracted scarlet fever and while taking care of them, Eleanor Boyd became sick herself and died from the disease. In 1933, Edwin had his first brush with the law when he was picked up for vagrancy by the Royal Canadian Mounted Police.

=== World War II ===
A few years later, Boyd joined the Royal Canadian Regiment, First Division. In June 1940, his regiment crossed the Channel to France. When his regiment was posted to Reigate, Surrey, Boyd met his first wife, Doreen Mary Frances Thompson. On August 20, 1941, almost nine months to the day after Boyd and Thompson married, she gave birth to a son, Edwin Alonzo Boyd, Jr. The baby was two days old when an air raid siren sounded; the bombing resulted in the baby suffering a cerebral hemorrhage from which he died. He was buried on August 30 in a York cemetery.

In early 1941, Doreen went to York and joined the Auxiliary Territorial Service but was too short to be a truck driver, so she became a motorcycle driver to join her husband in the war. Boyd was transferred to the Canadian Provost Corps on July 27, 1942, because he was displeased with the army. Soon after that, his wife discovered that she was pregnant again and this time they had twins on December 21, 1943. Boyd was officially discharged from the war effort on May 24, 1945, 16 days after Victory in Europe Day (VE Day) May 8, 1945.

== Crimes ==
Upon his return from the war, Boyd failed to find adequate permanent employment and turned to crime to provide for his wife and two children. On September 9, 1949, Boyd robbed a North York branch of the Bank of Montreal. Between September 1949 and October 1951, Boyd pulled at least six bank heists.

He joined up with another local thief, Howard Gault, and together they carried out several daring bank robberies. Edwin had a reputation for jumping over counters, moving quickly, and carrying a gun. Howard was caught and confessed to the robberies and identified Edwin as his accomplice. Edwin and Howard both went to the Don Jail in Toronto. While Boyd and his partner were robbing banks, another more violent gang was also doing the same thing. Lennie Jackson, a member of that gang, was caught at the same time as Boyd, and they began swapping notes while in jail. Soon another experienced bank robber, Willie Jackson (no relation to Lennie), alias The Clown, arrived at the Don Jail awaiting transfer to the Kingston Penitentiary for a seven-year sentence. Lennie Jackson had lost a foot in a railway accident and had a wooden foot in which he stored several hacksaw blades.

== The Boyd Gang ==
On November 4, 1951, Boyd and the Jacksons hacksawed the bars at the Kingston penitentiary, went over the prison wall and escaped. They met a friend, Valent Lesso from Cochrane, one of the violent members of Lennie Jackson’s original gang, and the four became a team. Lesso was a talented musician who couldn’t find work; he changed his name to Steve Suchan and became a bank robber. They soon pulled off a series of robberies, including the biggest one in Toronto history. The newspapers dubbed the new group "the Boyd Gang," seeing Boyd himself as the brains behind the operation. Willie Jackson was arrested and sent to the Don Jail. Boyd went into hiding with his wife Doreen.

== Arrest and release ==
The police received numerous calls from residents in West Ferris and Powassan, Ontario, and from a pharmacist in North Bay, but they did not pan out. After ten days, men were seen at a barn in the Don Valley and all members of the Boyd Gang, except Edwin Boyd himself, were captured without incident.

With Boyd the only gang member left to be captured, Detective Adolphus 'Dolph' Payne kept Boyd's brother Norman under surveillance and discovered that he had rented a flat on Heath Street, but had not moved in yet. He secured a key to the back door from the owner and watched, from a neighbour's house, as Boyd moved into the flat. Wanting to avoid a shootout, he waited until he was sure everyone was asleep. At the crack of dawn on March 15, 1952, the police crept inside the house and captured Boyd and his wife while they were still in bed. Boyd's brother, who was sleeping in another room, was also apprehended. The Toronto Nugget reported the event by stating "Edwin Alonzo Boyd, Canada’s Public Enemy Number One, surrendered meekly with his henchmen to two suburban detectives, ending the greatest criminal man hunt in the Dominion’s history."

Steve Suchan and Lennie Jackson were executed for killing Detective Tong.

Boyd received eight life sentences and Willie Jackson thirty years. Both were released on parole in 1962 after serving 10 years in Kingston Penitentiary for bank robbery.

Ex Bandit Boyd Calls For Police. Edwin Alonzo Boyd, who has spent much of his life dodging police, asked for their assistance last night to arrest his wife and her companion. He set up housekeeping in a west-central house for himself and his children. Last night Boyd sent a hurried call for help to Markham St. station when a man and woman arrived at his home and battered down the front door. The woman said she wanted to pick up clothing. Booked on charges of being drunk were Doreen Boyd and Kenneth Caustan, 40. In court today she pleaded guilty and was fined $5. She was returned to the cells until she could raise the money.

— Toronto Star, December 14, 1962

Boyd, under the name John, went to Victoria, British Columbia, where he drove a bus for disabled people and after divorcing Doreen married a disabled woman whom he met on the bus. He took care of her for the next 35 years, until they went into a retirement home.

== Death ==
Two months prior to his death, Boyd told a CBC producer that he had once killed a couple and left their bodies in the trunk of a car in High Park, Toronto, years before his notoriety as a bank robber. The crime fits the September 11, 1947, murders of Iris Scott and George Vigus.

Before a formal investigation into his confession could commence, on May 17, 2002, after a visit from his wife and his son, and a phone call from his former war bride and the mother of his three children, Edwin Alonzo Boyd died at age 88.

== Legacy ==
Two books have been written on the Boyd Gang, and one was made into a successful movie. Girls in the Gang, a musical written by Raymond Storey and Jon Roby, was based on the story of the Boyd gang. It debuted in 1987 at Toronto's Factory Theatre, produced by Dian English, and won a Dora Mavor Moore award for best musical.

In 1998 Boyd was profiled in a documentary on CBC Television's Life and Times, wherein he admitted that he had committed many more robberies than he had been charged with. A fictionalized film on Boyd's life, Citizen Gangster, was released in 2011; Scott Speedman plays the part of Boyd.

The episode "Scheherazade" of Law and Order: Special Victims Unit may have partially been based on Boyd's last days. In it, a former bank robber (Brian Dennehy) confesses to a murder shortly before dying.
