= List of World War II prisoner-of-war camps in Kenya =

British Prisoner of War Camps in East Africa during World War II

Part of Lists of Prisoner-of-War Camps section in the Prisoner-of-war camp article.

The following list is an attempt to create the most complete list of British POW Camps in East Africa during World War II.

Camp Number	Camp Name	Location	Near
351	Nairobi	Kenya	
352	Naivasha	Kenya	
353	Gilgil	Kenya	
354	Nanyuki	Kenya	
356	Eldoret	Kenya	
357	Mitubiri	Kenya	
358	Makindu	Kenya	
359	Burguret	Kenya	
360	Ndarugu	Kenya	
361	Namanga	Kenya	
362	Thika	Kenya	
365	Londiani	Kenya	
	Nyeri	Kenya	
	Nakuru	Kenya	
	Athi River	Kenya	
	Kajiado	Kenya	
	Mariakani	Kenya	
	Mombasa	Kenya	
	Kilindini	Kenya	
366	Jinja	Uganda	
	Kampala	Uganda	
	Soroti	Uganda	
	Longido	Tanganyka	
	Tabora	Tanganyka	

Table was retrieved from https://www.christies.com/en/lot/lot-407848 and from a map from II WW UK archives

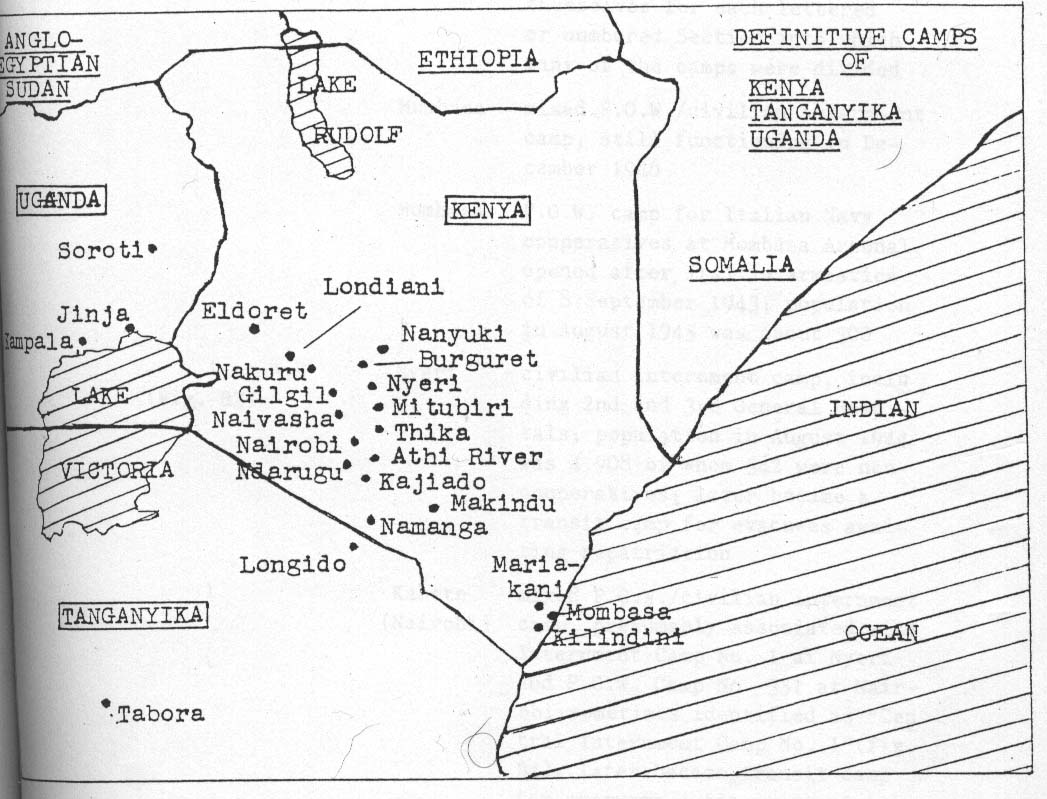
Definitive Camps in Kenya, Uganda, Tanganyka

Italian POW camps were mentioned in literature, i.e. Gilgil, Naivasha, Nyeri and Londiani., Ndarugu There was also an Italian POW camp at Mackinnon Road (60 miles from Mombasa). In 1950 it still had at least three 'prisoners' there who refused to leave! Roy Ashworth

Camp No. 360 at Ndarugu, that held some 10,000 prisoners, has miraculously escaped sub-division and new constructions. It was “discovered” by Mr. Aldo Manos in 2007, with the church and the monument built by the prisoners almost intact. In 2011 they were gazetted by the Government as “monuments of the history of Kenya”.

== See also ==
Reference to Camp 354 in No Picnic on Mount Kenya
