= Jane Hurshman =

Canadian Advocate for victims of domestic violence (1949–1992)

- Born: January 25, 1949; Brooklyn, Queens County, Nova Scotia
- Died: February 22, 1992 (aged 43); Halifax, Nova Scotia
- Body discovered: Halifax waterfront
- Other names: Jane Stafford, Jane Whynot
- Education: Lunenburg Regional Vocational School
- Occupations: nursing assistant, women's advocate
- Known for: killing her husband and being acquitted

Jane Hurshman Corkum (January 25, 1949 – February 22, 1992) was a Canadian woman best known for having killed her abusive ex-husband Lamont William "Billy" Stafford on the evening of March 11, 1982, and for being acquitted of his murder.

The Crown appealed, concerned with the legal precedent, and Corkum pleaded guilty to manslaughter, receiving a six-month sentence. She was released after two months.

On February 23, 1992, her body was found in a car on the Halifax waterfront, dead from a single gunshot wound.

== In media ==
- A made-for-television film, Life with Billy was produced in 1994.
- The song Waltz For Jane by Denis Ryan's 5 Pound Spent.

== See also ==
- Jane Hurshman Memorial Fund
- Battered person syndrome

== Sources ==
- Vallée, Brian (1998). Life and Death with Billy. Toronto: Seal Books. ISBN 0-7704-2818-5.
- Vallée, Brian (1995). Life after Billy : Jane's story : the aftermath of abuse. Toronto: Seal Books. ISBN 978-0-7704-2622-4. OCLC 1310744409.
