= Natural history of Mount Kenya =

A map showing the vegetation zones around Mount Kenya.

The flora and fauna of Mount Kenya are diverse, due to the variation in altitude, rainfall, aspect and temperature. The mountain slopes can be divided into vegetation zones, with each zone having different dominant plant species. Although many plants on Mount Kenya have local (Kikuyu, Meru, Embu) names, here they are reported only with their English and scientific names.

Weather on the mountain mostly comes from the Indian Ocean, to the east and south-east. Consequently, these slopes are wettest. The wetter slopes can support thicker forests and more bamboo, as well as plants that require more water. The eastern and south-eastern slopes have more biodiversity than the northern and western slopes.

The vegetation zones on Mount Kenya are more or less distinct. The relatively flat land surrounding the mountain are too dry for forest, and were once savanna grasslands, now often converted to agriculture or are used for grazing with more of the native flora intact. The lower slopes are covered in montane forest, which has also been largely cleared for cultivation, being more intact along the Chogoria Track to the southeast. Above this forest are large tracts of bamboo, especially in the east and south-east. The upper montane forest is dominated by Podocarpus trees. Above this is the timberline forest, characterized by Hagenia (rosewood). Directly above the treeline are heathland (on the wetter aspect) and subalpine chaparral (on the drier aspects). Higher up the mountain the vegetation becomes more specially adapted to the cold in the Afro-alpine zone, and the largely unvegetated area that has until recently been glaciated is known as the nival zone.

There are plant species typical of each zone, with those at higher altitudes often exhibiting striking specializations. Approximately three-quarters of Afro-alpine vegetation is endemic. Vertebrate animals move between different vegetation zones.

== Zones ==
=== Lowlands surrounding the mountain ===
The area surrounding the mountain is around 2,000 metres (6,600 ft) in elevation. The climate is warm and dry, and the natural vegetation is mainly grassland and thorny scrub.

Many types of grasses grow here, and the trees and bushes in this area are used by the local people in a variety of ways. The shrubs Euphorbia tirucalli (Kik. kariaria) and non-native Lantana camara are planted as hedges.

There are patches of native woodland, with the dominant native trees being in the genera Acacia and Combretum. Eucalyptus and fruit trees have been introduced.

=== Cultivated zone ===
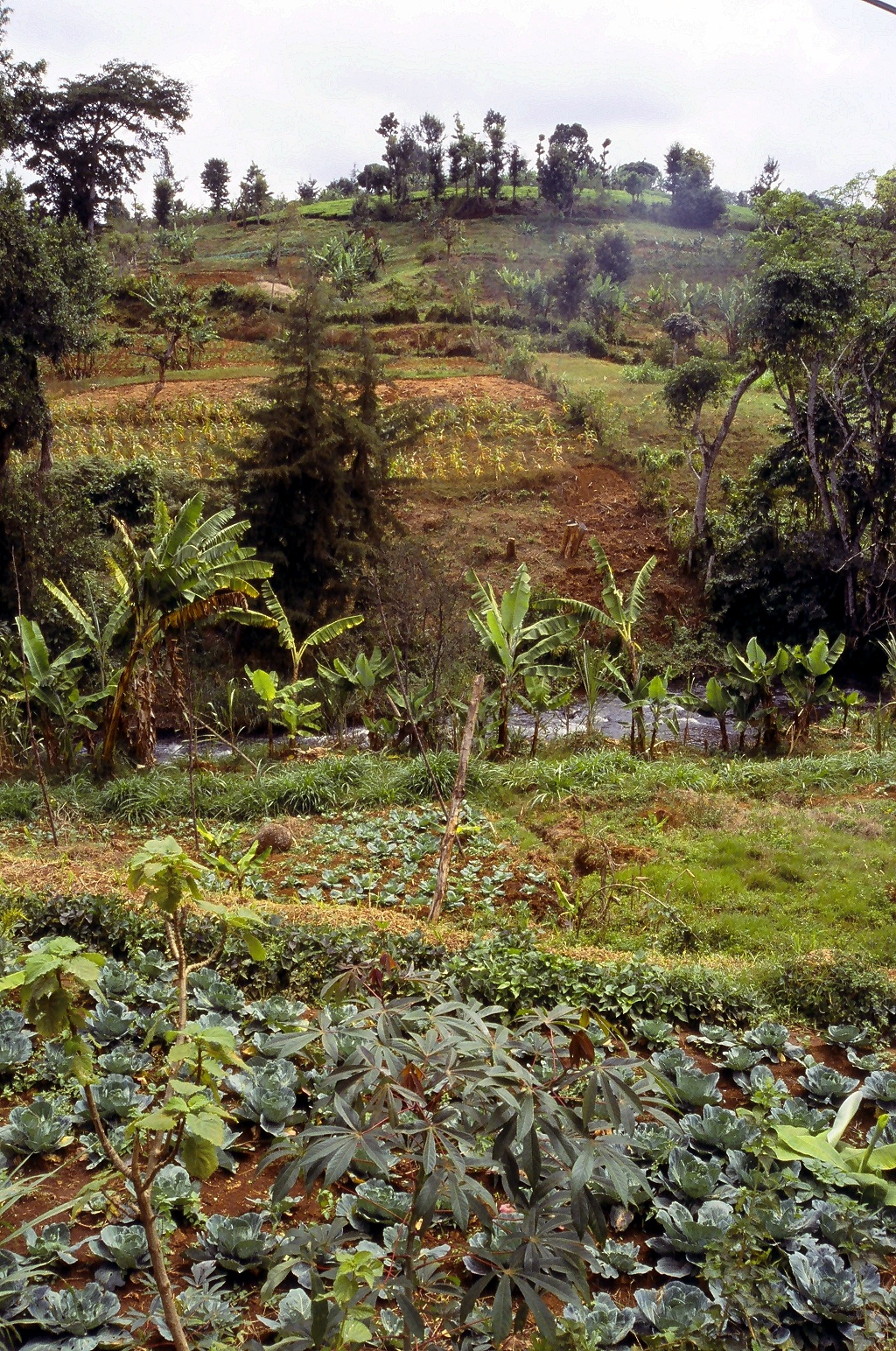
The lower slopes of Mount Kenya are very fertile and the area is heavily cultivated

The soils are moist and fertile due to past volcanic activity.

Most of the area that is now cultivated on the slopes of Mount Kenya used to be forest. During the deforestation to provide land for crops and grazing some trees were left standing. From these trees it is possible to get an idea of trees that used to exist in the forests. However, it is not at all representative since trees were usually felled or retained for specific reasons. Sacred and useful trees were often standing, and other trees that were more frequently retained were those that grow well alongside food crops as well as species that provide shade for grazing animals. Fig trees are considered sacred by the Kikuyu, so can frequently be seen standing on their lands. As well as selectively retaining native trees, plantations of exotic trees can also found, such as those of pine, eucalyptus and cypress. For these reasons one must be careful when inferring the original composition of the forests.

The crops that are grown around Mount Kenya have changed since the arrival of Europeans and the increase in trade. The people who lived around the mountain in the late 19th century grew crops such as millet, sorghum, beans and yams, but new species have now been introduced.

Crops that are frequently grown are tea, coffee, beans, maize, bananas, potatoes, rice, citrus fruits, mangoes and vegetables. The crops grown on different aspects of the mountain vary due to the significant differences in the amount of rainfall between the northern and southern slopes. The southern slopes are much wetter, so are ideal for growing tea and coffee, whereas the northern slopes are too dry for these crops. A few large scale farms grow wheat and barley. Livestock are often kept in the drier areas, particularly cows for their milk. A system of irrigation has been developed which has increased productivity in the drier regions. However, many people in Kenya are dependent on the rainfall on the mountain, and cultivation and more recently extensive illegal irrigation is reducing the amount of water that gets to more distant areas, causing drought there.

Between 1,800 metres (5,900 ft) and 2,500 metres (8,200 ft) there is sub-montane forest, which is exploited by forest-based industries, such as sawmills, furniture and construction, despite official restrictions on forest cutting.

Before 1900 there were many wild animals found in the lower regions of Mount Kenya. Buffalo, rhinoceros, lion and many species of antelopes were common, as were hippopotamus and crocodiles around the rivers. Since 1900 many of these animals have been greatly reduced.

forest

=== Bamboo zone ===
The bamboo zone is found in the middle of the forest zone. It is natural, and not the result of deforestation or other disturbances. Bamboo Yushania alpina (Kik. mũrangi) is restricted to areas of higher rainfall. For this reason it is sparse and often stunted on the northern slopes of the mountain, and in some places absent entirely. In the western and southwestern slopes the bamboo can grow up to 9 metres (30 ft), and in the wetter south-eastern slopes it can grow as high as 15 metres (50 ft). Bamboo suppresses other vegetation, but there are scattered trees in this zone, including juniper, podocarpus, and witch-hazel, plus varieties of flowers, ferns and mosses.

Adult bamboo is not palatable to most animals, and the fauna is reduced here. However, there are many tracks through the bamboo made by large animals such as buffalo and elephant on their way between the lower and upper forests.

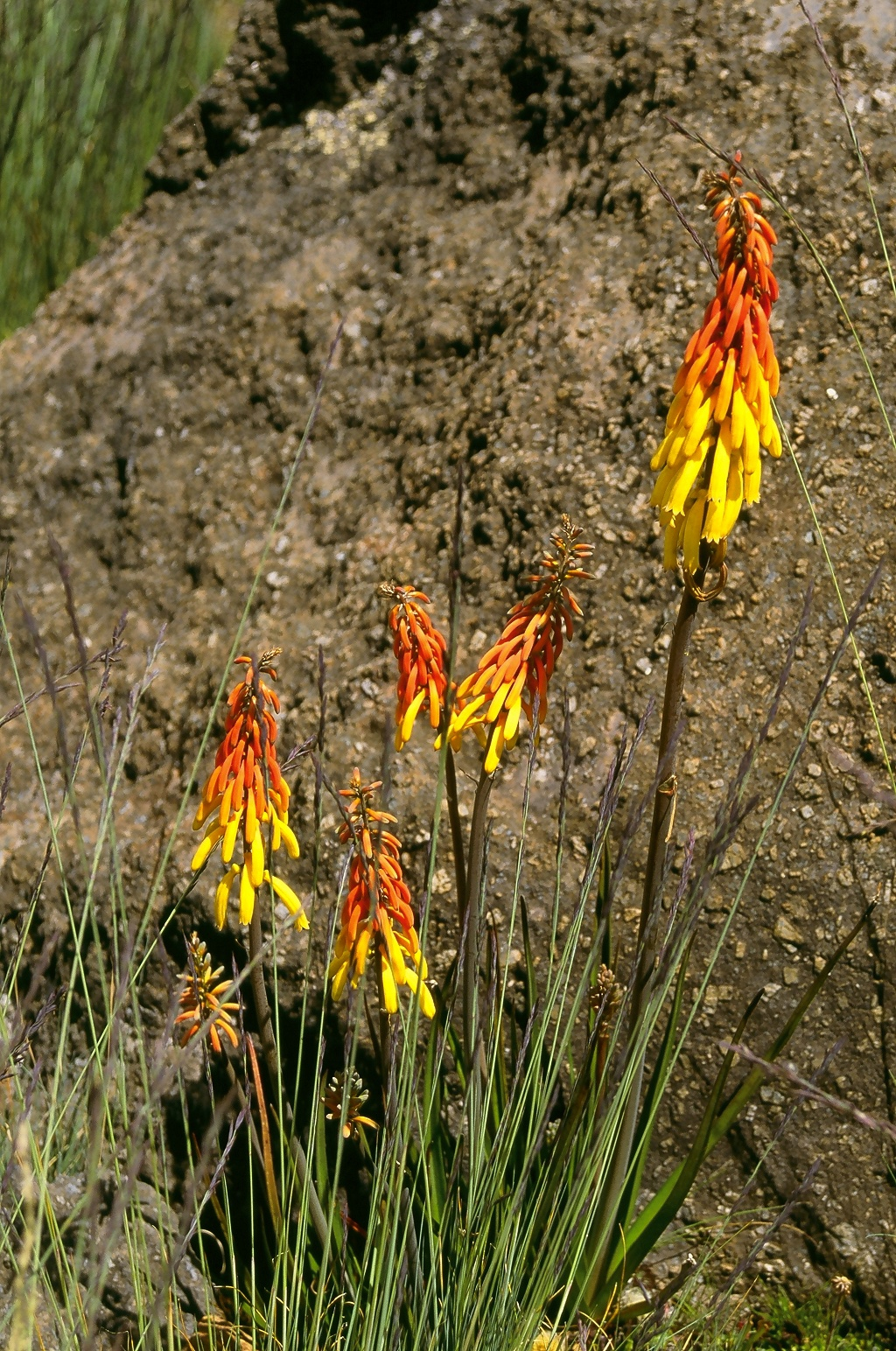
Red-hot poker is one of the flowers found in timberline forest and lower heathland zones.

=== Timberline forest ===
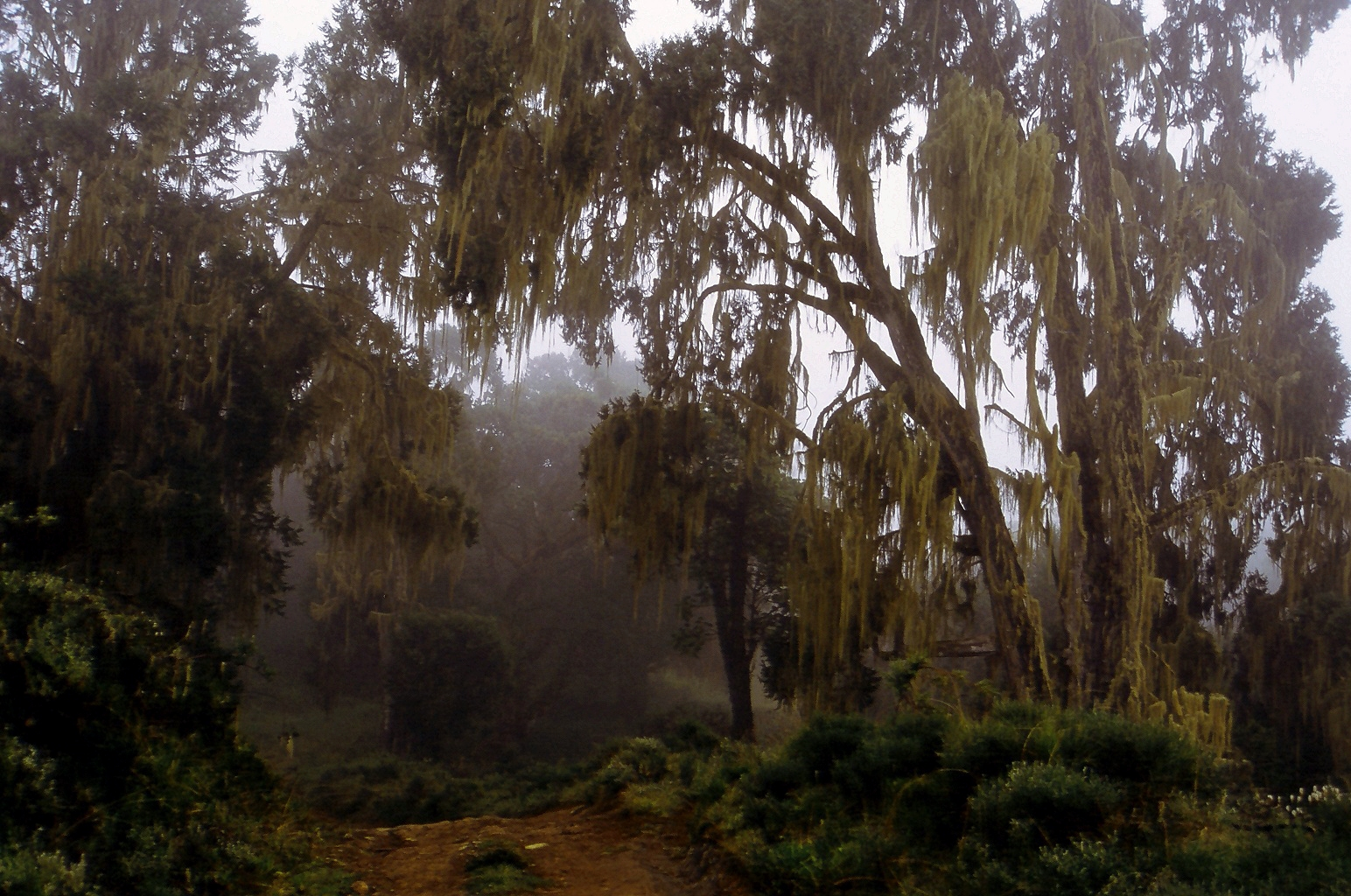
Mosses are common in the timberline forest.

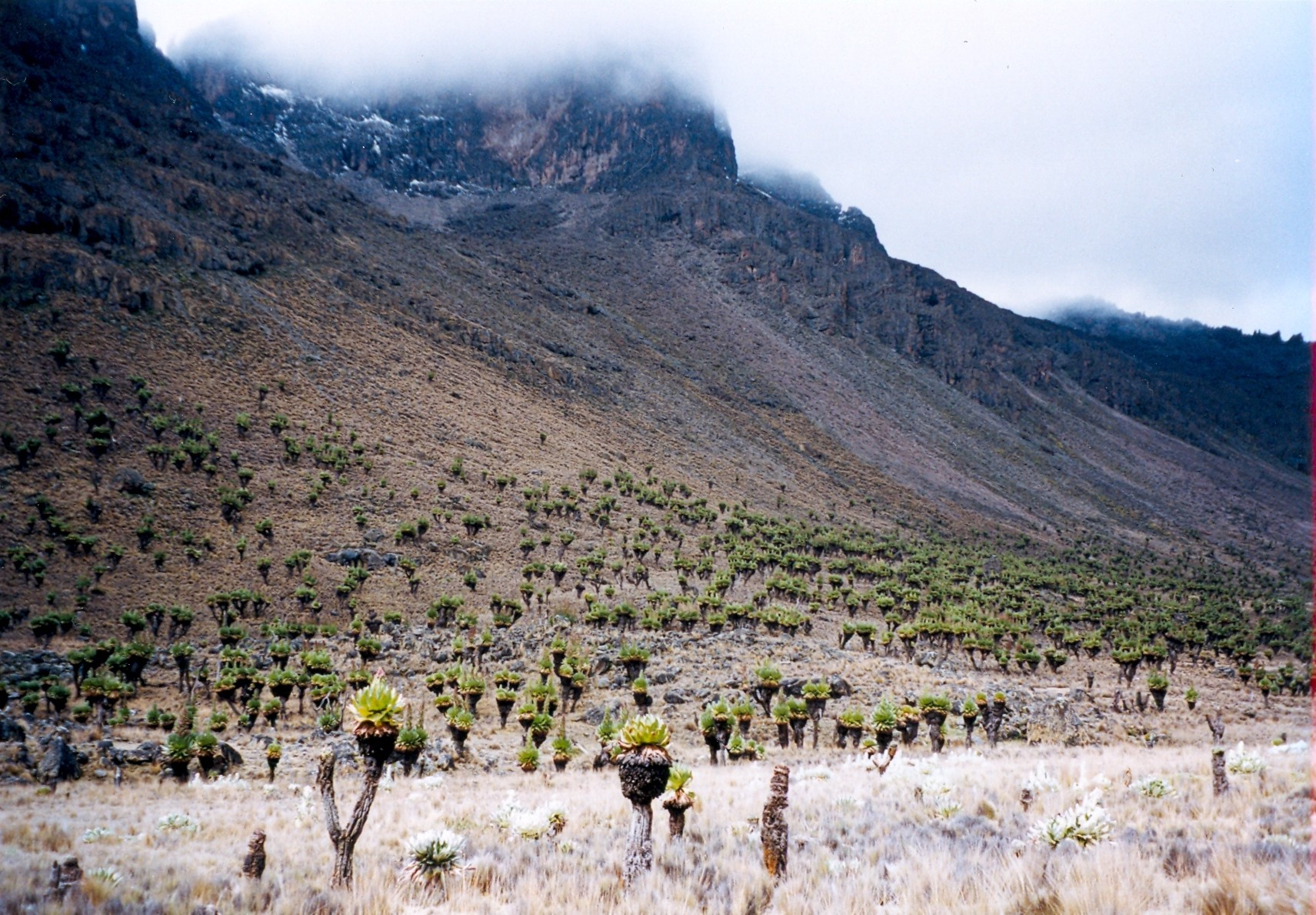
Giant groundsels in the Mackinder Valley

The timberline forest is usually found between 3,000 metres (9,800 ft) and 3,500 metres (11,500 ft), although it extends to lower altitudes on the drier slopes. Smaller trees dominate in the timberline forest, and the characteristic trees are African rosewood (Hagenia abyssinica, Kik. mũmondo, mũthithikũ) and giant St. John's wort (Hypericum). The common flowers are red-hot poker (Kniphofia thomsonii), violets (Viola spp.), and giant forest lobelias (Lobelia bambuseti and Lobelia giberroa (Kik. mũhehe)).

=== Heathland and chaparral ===
Heathland and chaparral are found between 3,200 metres (10,500 ft) and 3,800 metres (12,500 ft). Heathland is found in the wetter areas, and chaparral is found in the drier areas. Most of the plants in these areas are shrubs with small leaves. The dominant plants in the heathland areas are Erica and Phillipia, which can grow to over 10 metres (33 ft) tall. In chaparral the plants are often shrubbier and more aromatic, such as African sage (Artemisia afra) and sugarbush (Protea kilimanjaro). These habitats may be prone to fire.

Herbs found in the heathland and chaparral zone are gentians (Swertia spp.) and large tussock sedges (Carex spp.), with alpine species living higher up in the zone.

Animals in this zone are a mixture of forest and alpine species. There are few resident large animals in this zone, but rats, mice and voles live at this altitude, and their predators, the eagles, buzzards and kites, are present. Herds of eland are sometimes found, and occasional lions, but there are no longer rhino on Mount Kenya.

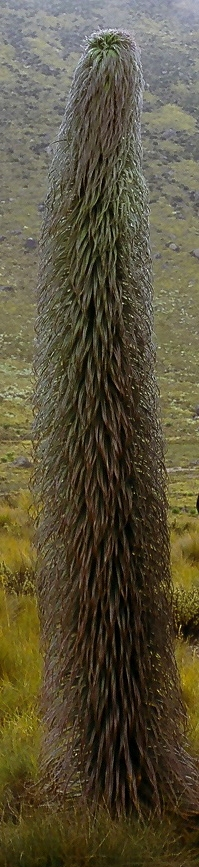
The inflorescence of Lobelia telekii can grow up to 3 metres (10 ft) tall

=== Afro-alpine zone ===
The Afro-alpine zone starts at about 3,500 metres (11,500 ft). It is characterised by cold temperatures, thin dry air, and large daily temperature fluctuations. Plants are subject to solifluction, where needle ice is produced every night in wetter soils. This ice uproots seedlings and can damage roots. Some plants have evolved to live without roots, such as lichens and moss-balls. Giant lobelias Lobelia deckenii have small reservoirs of water between their leaves where water can freeze every night without damaging the plants. When these plants are subjected to temperatures above 15 °C (59 °F), photosynthesis is considerably reduced.

There are three genera of giant rosette plants; Carduus, Dendrosenecio and Lobelia. Carduus keniensis, the giant thistle, is endemic to Mount Kenya and the Aberdares. Giant groundsels, Senecio spp. (or Dendrosenecio), are only found on East African mountains. They have leaves up to 1 metre (3 ft) long, and some species have arborescent (treelike) stems.

Dendrosenecio keniodendron is endemic to Mount Kenya. It is a giant rosette plant, and can grow up to 6 metres (20 ft) tall. It tends to grow in dense groups of even-sized plants, and flowers every 5–20 years, often in synchrony across the population.

The two giant groundsel species, Dendrosenecio keniodendron and Dendrosenecio keniensis are separated by altitude and topography. D. keniodendron occurs more frequently with increasing elevation above 3,900 metres (12,800 ft) and up to 4,500 metres (14,800 ft), whereas D. keniensis occurs mainly below 4,000 metres (13,100 ft) and very rarely above 4,200 metres (13,800 ft). At intermediate elevations, D. brassica occurs mainly on the wetter valley bottoms, and D. keniodendron mostly on the drier slopes. Where the two species come in close proximity, hybrids are not uncommon.

Also present are Carex monostachya, Agrostis trachyphylla, Carduus platyplyllus, Arabis alpina, Senecio keniophytum and Lobelia telekii.

There are giant grass tussocks - Festuca pilgeri in wetter areas and Pentaschistis minor in drier areas.

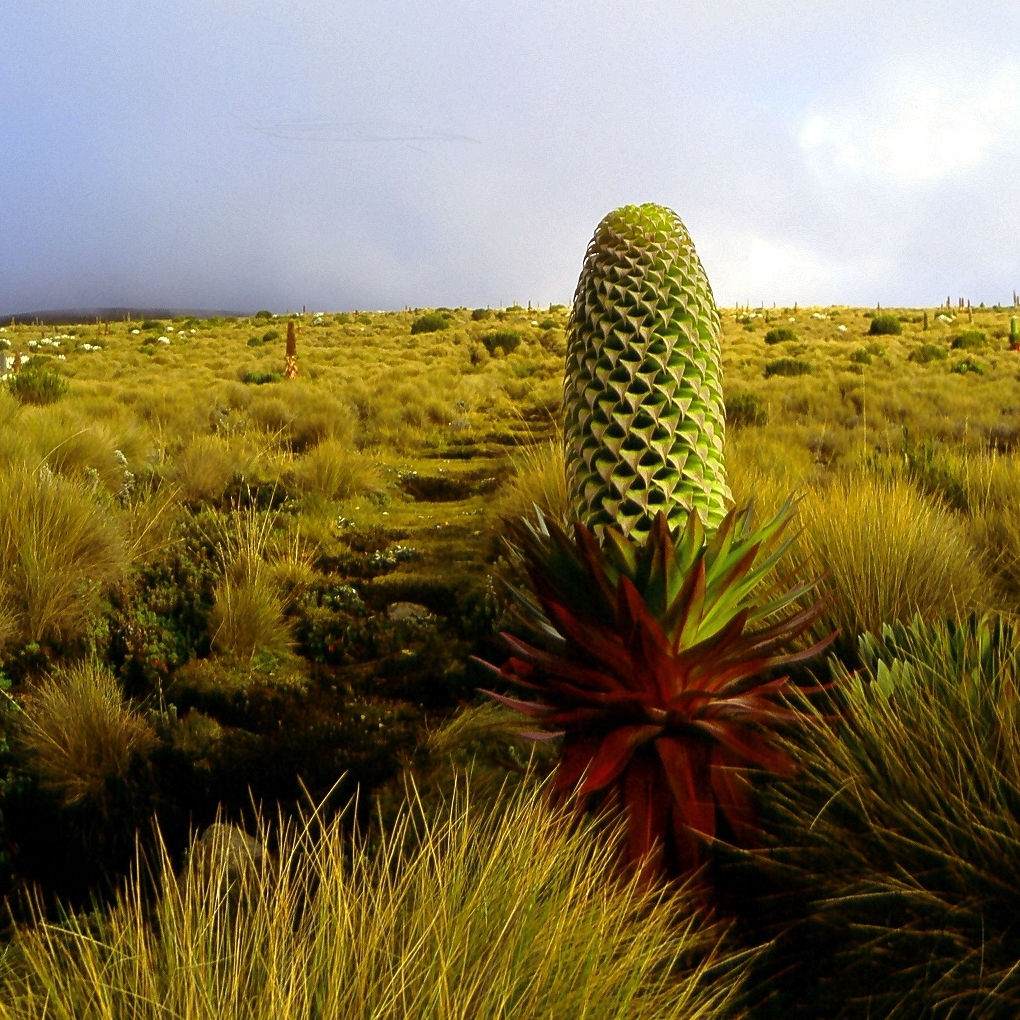
Giant lobelias grow as sessile rosettes up to 50 centimetres (20 in) across, but produce inflorescences to 3 metres (10 ft) tall. Tussock grass grows alongside the lobelias.

Dendrosenecio keniensis, Lobelia keniensis and tussock grasses are dominant in the wetter areas. The Alchemilla species A. cyclophylla, A. argyrophylla and A. johnstonii are dominant in the drier areas.

There are over 100 species of wildflowers in the Afro-alpine zone including everlastings (Helichrysum spp.), buttercups (Ranunculus orephytes), sunburst (Haplocarpha rupellii) and African gladioli (Gladiolus thomsoni). Because of variation in flowering times, some species are in flower at all times of year.

On the alpine slopes there several species of birds. red-tufted sunbirds live here, as well as alpine chats, slender-billed starlings, wagtails and birds of prey such as augur buzzard, lammergeier, Mackinder's eagle owl, and Verreaux's eagle (which specializes on hunting rock hyrax). Birds pollinate Lobelia species.

There are also butterflies, but there are no bees, wasps, fleas, or mosquitoes. Trout have been introduced to the streams and tarns and are now found all around the mountain.

Smaller mammal species live in the Afro-alpine zone, including the groove-toothed rat, giant mole-rats, African dormice and rock hyrax. Few large mammals are found at this altitude. Eland and zebra are found in dry areas, and common duiker are found throughout the alpine zone. Buffalo, elephant and hyena are also visitors.

The only common large mammalian carnivore in the Afro-alpine zone is the leopard, although lion and hyena have also been seen in the alpine zone. Melanistic leopards occur.

=== The nival zone ===
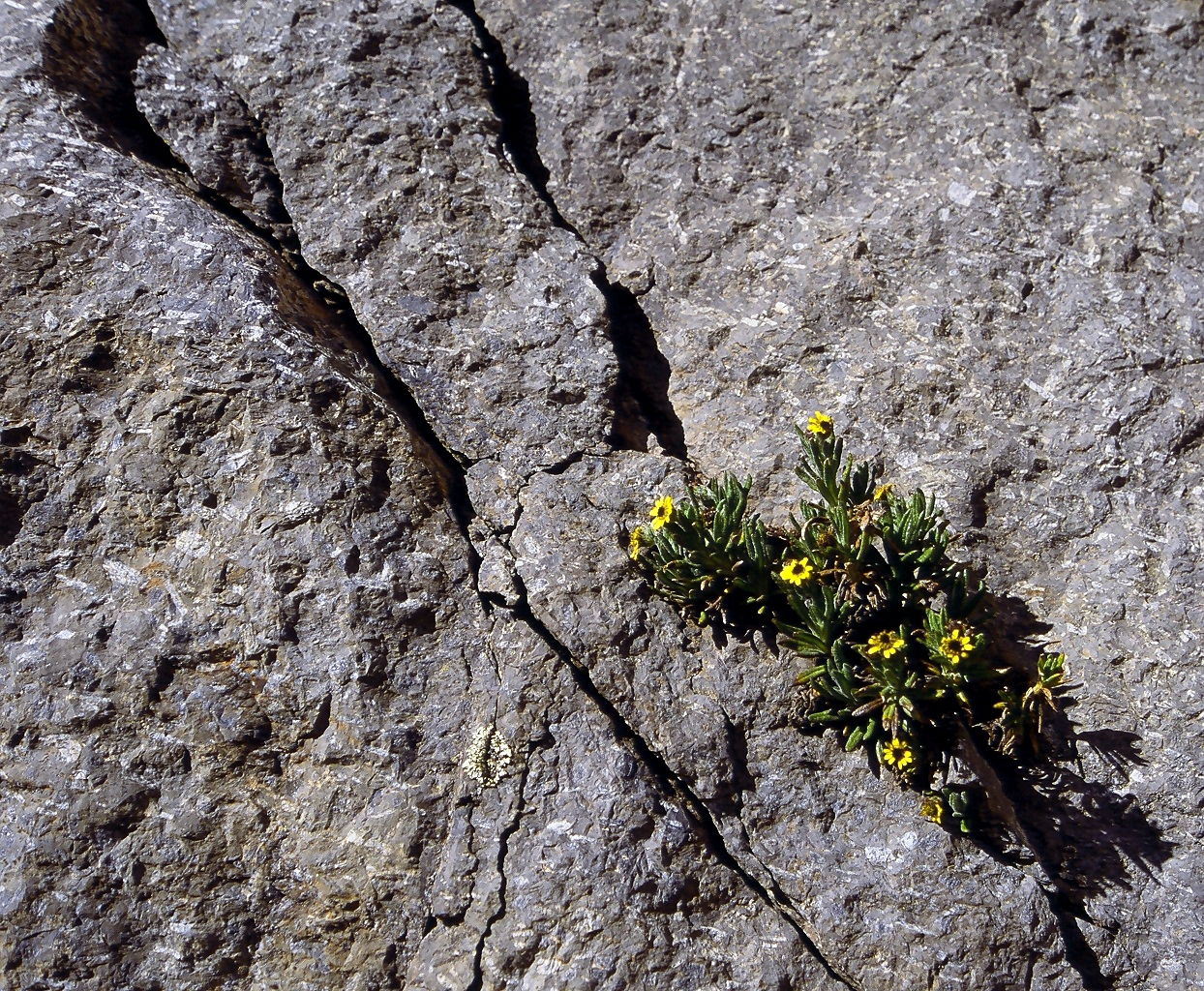
Plants in the nival zone are scarce. They must be small to withstand the climate.

The nival zone is the area above most vegetation. On Mount Kenya this area is usually above 4,500 metres (14,800 ft). There are still scattered giant groundsels, Helichrysum and Lobelia, as well as a few other plant species. Buffalo, elephant, leopard and hyena have all been seen in this zone, although very infrequently.

== See also ==
- Mount Kenya
- Mount Kenya National Park
- Climate of Mount Kenya
