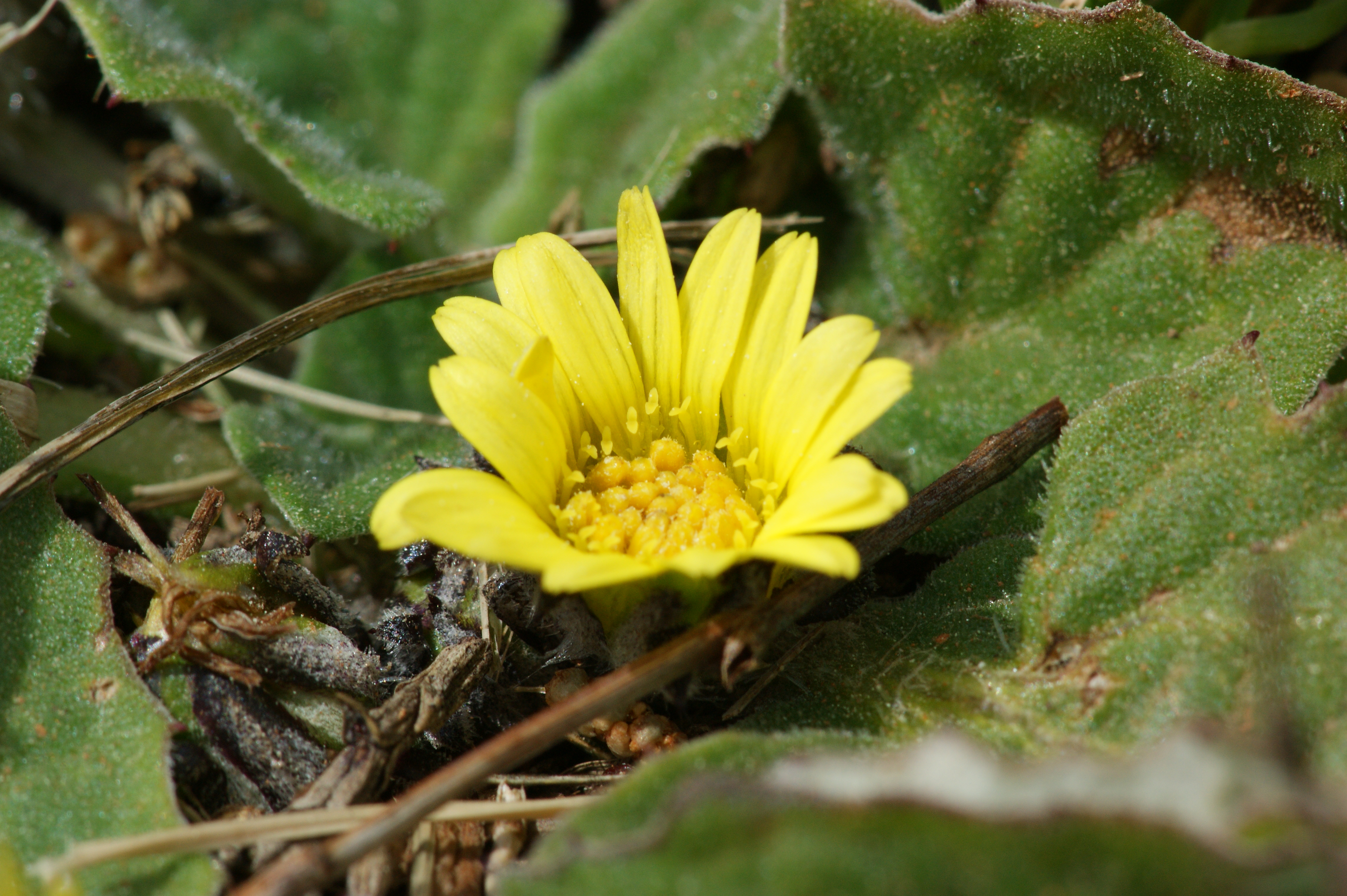
- Cymbonotus lawsonianus

Scientific classification
- Kingdom: Plantae
- Clade: Tracheophytes
- Clade: Angiosperms
- Clade: Eudicots
- Clade: Asterids
- Order: Asterales
- Family: Asteraceae
- Subfamily: Vernonioideae
- Tribe: Arctotideae
- Subtribe: Arctotidinae
- Genus: Cymbonotus; Cassini

Type species
- Cymbonotus lawsonianus

Species
- Cymbonotus lawsonianus Gaudich. (type species); Cymbonotus maidenii (Beauverd) A.E.Holland & V.A.Funk; Cymbonotus preissianus Steetz in Lehmann

= Cymbonotus =

Genus of flowering plants

Cymbonotus is a genus of flowering plants in the family Asteraceae from southern Australia. Three species are recognised. The type species is C. lawsonianus of eastern Australia, commonly known as bear's ears.

Molecular studies of African genera and C. lawsonianus showed the genus to be very closely related to the genera Arctotis and Haplocarpha, suggesting they must have been dispersed across the Indian Ocean to Australia somehow.
