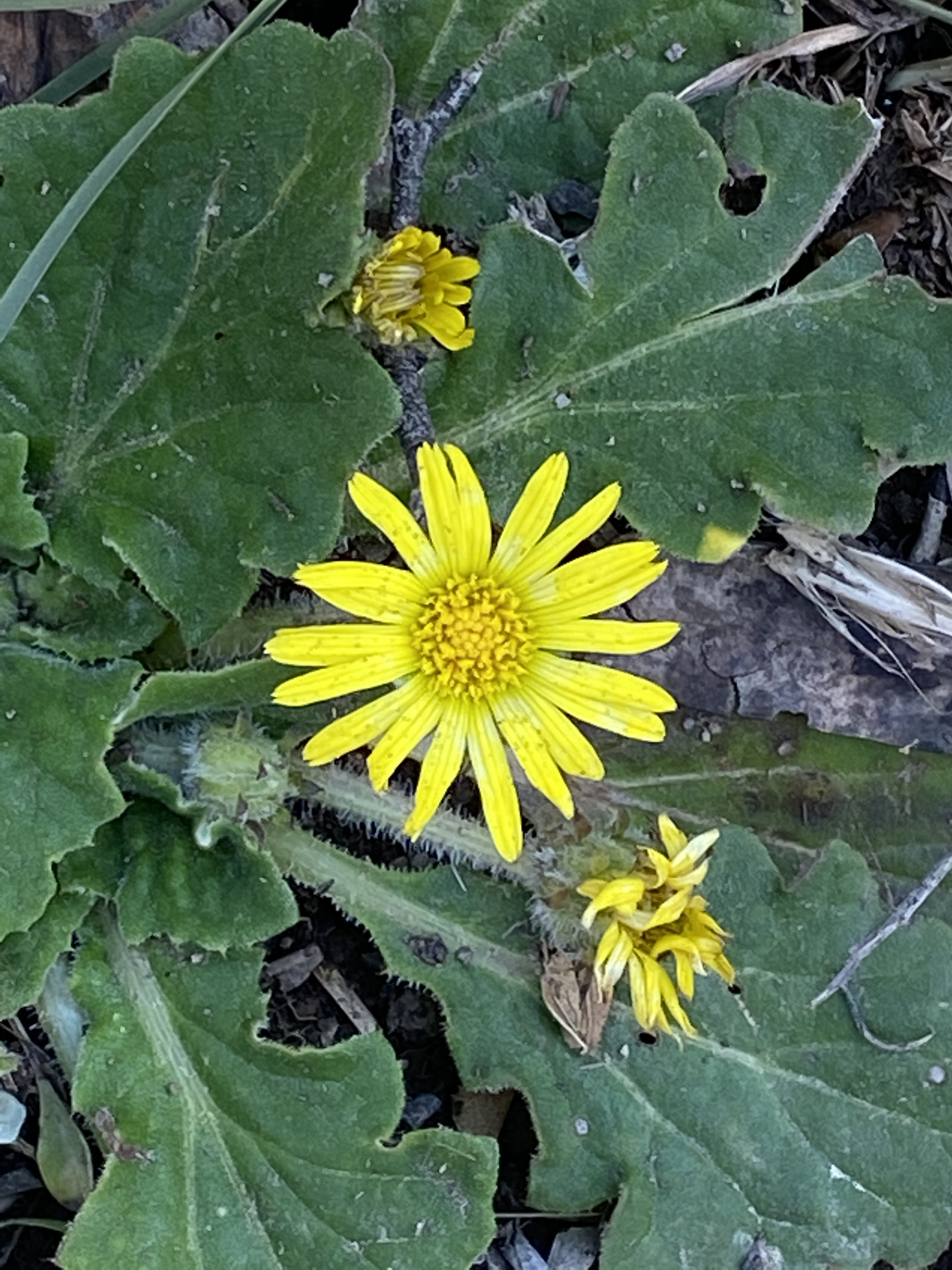
- Near Goulburn

Scientific classification
- Kingdom: Plantae
- Clade: Tracheophytes
- Clade: Angiosperms
- Clade: Eudicots
- Clade: Asterids
- Order: Asterales
- Family: Asteraceae
- Genus: Cymbonotus
- Species: C. lawsonianus

Binomial name
- Cymbonotus lawsonianus Gaudich.

= Cymbonotus lawsonianus =

Bears ear

Species of flowering plant

Cymbonotus lawsonianus, commonly known as bears ear, is a species of small shrub in the family Asteraceae from southeastern Australia. It has been described as Arctotis lawsoniana. It is one of three species in the small genus Cymbonotus. It was named in honour of the explorer William Lawson.

Cymbonotus lawsonianus is a herbaceous annual which may reach 30 cm (12 in) high, its leaves arranged in a rosette pattern on the ground. The leaves themselves are ovate, lanceolate or elliptic, and measure anywhere from 2 to 25 cm (0.8–10 in) long, 2–9 cm (0.8-3.6 in) wide, with margins entire or toothed. The yellow flowers occur from autumn to spring (March to October), and are pollinated by insects. They are followed by small black seeds in early spring (September and October).

It is found from Toowoomba and the Darling Downs in south-eastern Queensland southwards throughout New South Wales, and into northern Victoria, southeastern South Australia and Tasmania. It grows on both clay and sandstone soils and various loams in between, often in forest or open woodland. It can also be found in parks and gardens.

Molecular studies of African genera and C. lawsonianus showed the plant to be very closely related to the genera Arctotis and Haplocarpha, suggesting they must have been dispersed across the Indian Ocean to Australia somehow.

It is adaptable to the home garden and grows in a variety of soils, although does not tolerate waterlogging. It is a good rockery plant. Early settlers mixed the plant in lard and used as a wound salve.
