= Climate of Mount Kenya =

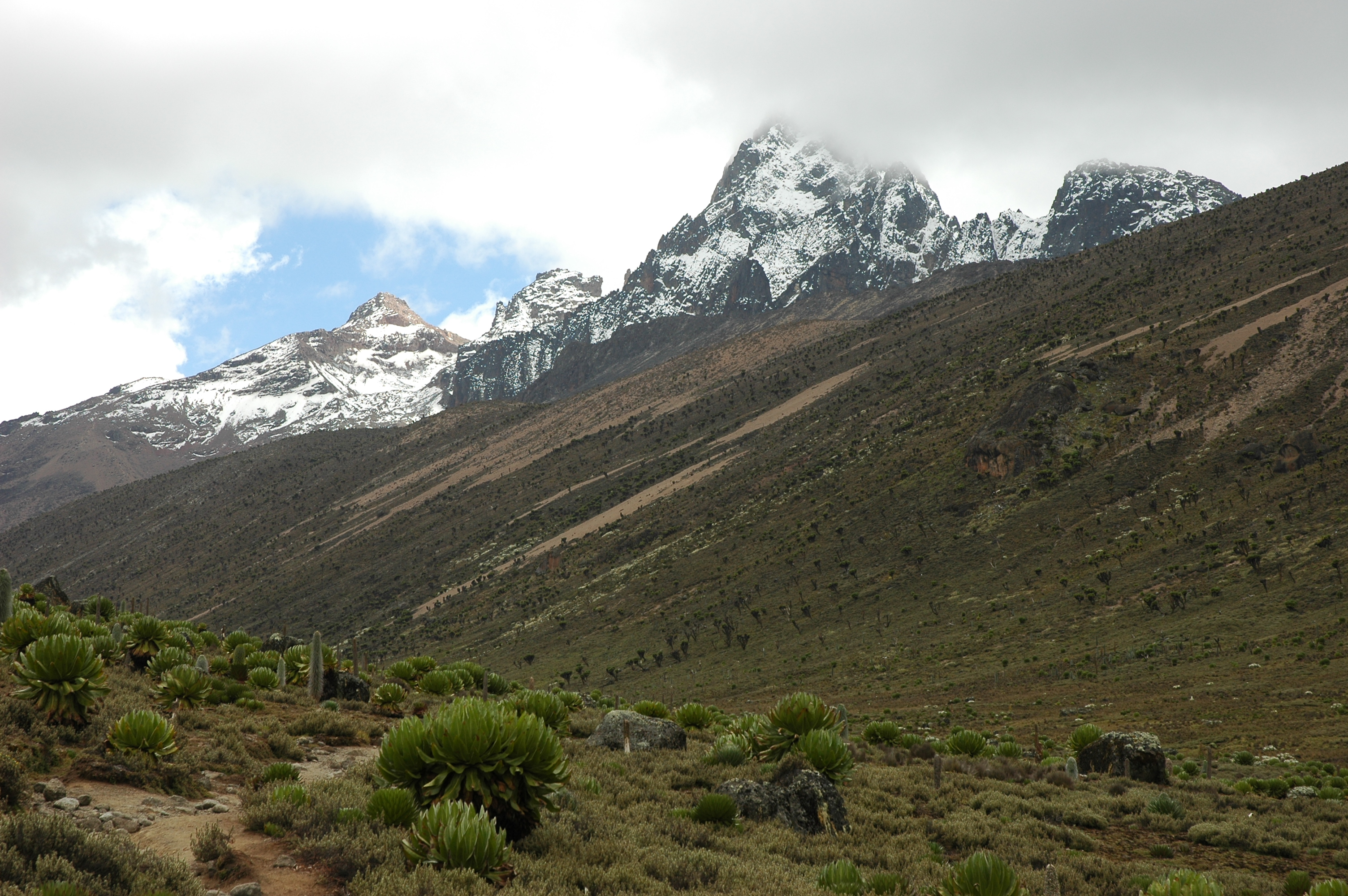
Mount Kenya is an extinct volcano which originally rose an estimated 3 million years ago and last erupted an estimated 2.6 million years ago.

The climate of Mount Kenya has played a critical role in the development of the mountain, influencing the topography and ecology amongst other factors. The area around Mount Kenya is covered by a comparably large number of weather station data with long measurements series and thus the climate is well recorded. It has a typical equatorial mountain climate which Hedberg described as winter every night and summer every day.

The year is divided into two distinct wet seasons and two distinct dry seasons which mirror the wet and dry seasons in the Kenyan lowlands. As Mount Kenya ranges in height from 1,374 metres (4,508 ft) to 5,199 metres (17,057 ft) the climate varies considerably over the mountain and has different zones of influence. The lower, south eastern slopes are the wettest as the predominant weather system comes from the Indian Ocean. This leads to very dense montane forest on these slopes. High on the mountain most of the precipitation falls as snow, but the most important water source is frost. Combined, these feed 11 glaciers.

== Current climate ==
The current climate on Mount Kenya is wet, but drier than it has been in the past. The temperatures span a wide range, which diminishes with altitude. In the lower alpine zone they usually don't go below 12 °C (54 °F). Snow and rain are common from March to December, but especially in the two wet seasons. The wet seasons combined account for 5/6 of the annual precipitation. The monsoon, which controls the wet and dry seasons, means that most of the year there are south-easterly winds, but during January and February the dominant wind direction is north-easterly.

=== Seasons ===
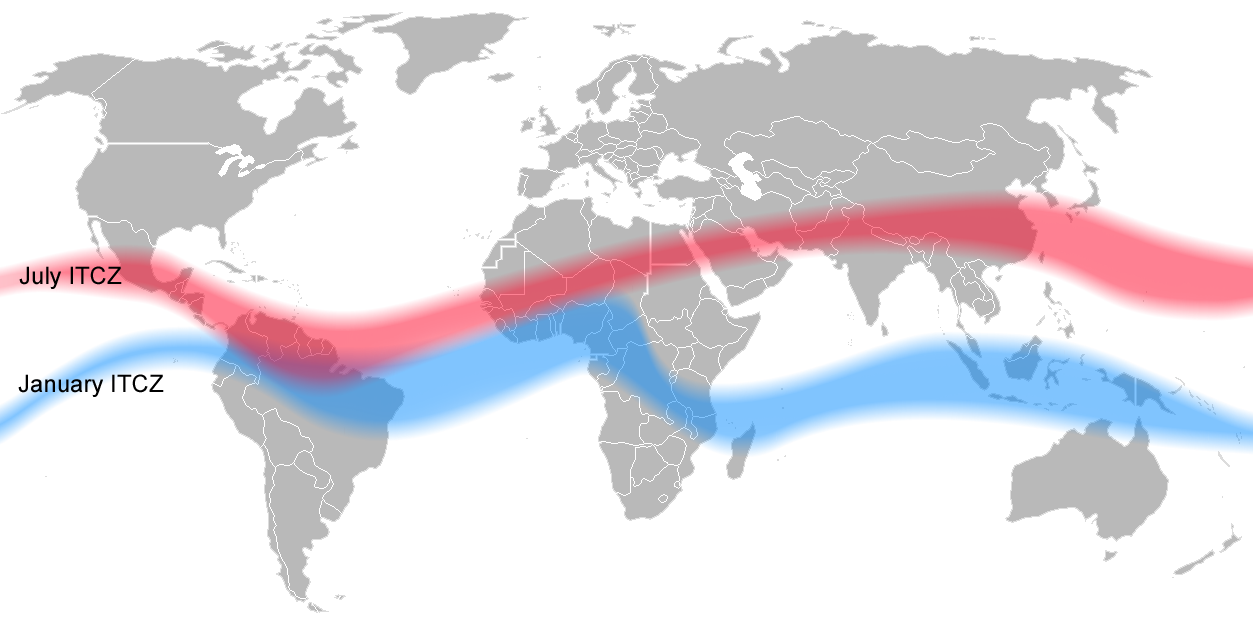
In January the Intertropical Convergence Zone (ITCZ) is in its southern extreme over the Indian Ocean. In July it is over its northern extreme over Tibet and Arabia. As it swaps over, Mount Kenya experiences a wet season.

Mount Kenya, like most locations in the tropics, has two wet seasons and two dry seasons as a result of the monsoon. From mid-March to June the heavy rain season, known as the long rains, brings approximately half of the annual rainfall on the mountain. This is followed by the wetter of the two dry seasons which lasts until September. October to December are the short rains when the mountain receives approximately a third of its rainfall total. Finally from December to mid-March is the dry, dry season when the mountain experiences the least rain.

Mount Kenya straddles the equator. This means during the Northern Hemisphere summer the Sun is to the north of the mountain. The altitude and aspect of the watersheds and main peaks results in the north side of the upper mountain being in summer conditions. Simultaneously, the southern side is experiencing winter conditions. Once it is the Southern Hemisphere summer, the situation reverses.

=== Weather systems ===
The Hadley Cell controls the Intertropical Convergence Zone which in the Indian Ocean is referred to as the Monsoon

The low pressure belt around the equator known as the Intertropical Convergence Zone (ITCZ) is responsible for the wet and dry seasons of Mount Kenya. During the two dry seasons the ITCZ is over Arabia during July and southern Tanzania and northern Zambia in March. The belt of low pressure passes over Kenya as it swaps between its two extremes and Mount Kenya, and Kenya, experience wet seasons. The amount of rain fluctuates from year to year and is dependent on sea surface temperatures in the Atlantic and Indian Ocean as well as El Niño amongst other factors. Warmer seas and El Niño both result in enhanced rainfall.

At all times of year except around January, a low pressure situated over Tibet drives winds in a horseshoe shape from the Indian Ocean, over eastern Africa and then towards India. This results in a predominant south-easterly wind on Mount Kenya. Around January the reverse is true and Mount Kenya has mainly north-easterly winds.

The mountain rises steeply from around 1,400 metres (4,600 ft) to 5,199 metres (17,057 ft) and so is a major obstacle to the predominant winds. During the wet seasons, the monsoon from the Indian ocean bring moist air to the mountain. This air is stably stratified and often cloudy. It is mostly diverted around the sides of the mountain as opposed to going over it, especially June to October. At other times of year, the air can be forced up the mountain resulting in orographic rain. In this case heavy thunderstorms can occur.

=== Daily pattern ===
During the dry season the mountain almost always follows the same daily weather pattern. Large daily temperature fluctuations occur which led Hedberg to exclaim winter every night and summer every day. There is variation in minimum and maximum temperatures day to day, but the standard deviation of the mean hourly pattern is small.

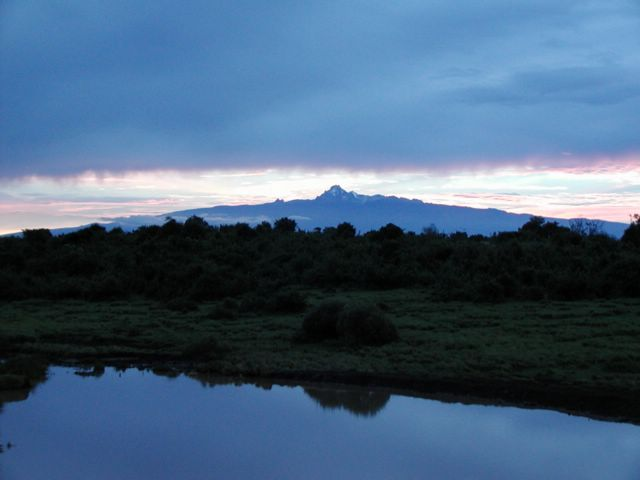
In the dry season, mornings are typically clear and cool, but the mountain is hidden in cloud by mid-day.

A typical day is clear and cool in the morning with low humidity. The mountain is in direct sunlight which causes the temperatures to rise quickly with the warmest temperatures occurring between 9 am and midday. This corresponds to a maxima in the pressure, usually around 10 am. Low on the mountain, between 2,400 metres (7,900 ft) and 3,000 metres (9,800 ft), clouds begin to form over the western forest zone, due to moist air from Lake Victoria. The anabatic winds caused by warm rising air gradually bring these clouds to the summit region in the afternoon. Around 3 pm there is a minimum in sunlight and a maximum in humidity causing the actual and perceived temperature to drop. At 4 pm there is a minimum in the pressure. This daily cover of cloud protects the glaciers on the south-west of the mountain which would otherwise get direct sun every day, enhancing their melt. The upwelling cloud eventually reaches the dry easterly air streams and dissipates, leading to a clear sky by 5pm. There is another maxima of temperature associated with this.

Being an equatorial mountain the day light hours are constant with twelve hour days. Sunrise is about 0530 with the sun setting at 1730. Over the course of the year there is a one-minute difference between the shortest and longest days. At night, the sky is usually clear with katabatic winds blowing down the valleys. Above the lower alpine zone there is usually frost every night.

=== Temperature ===
The temperatures on Mount Kenya fluctuate greatly. This fluctuation is largest on the lower slopes of the moorland zone. At an altitude of 3,000 metres (9,800 ft) there is an 11.5 °C mean range in daily temperature, this goes down to 7.5 °C at 4,200 metres (13,800 ft) and 4 °C at 4,800 metres (15,700 ft). The diurnal temperature fluctuation reduces with altitude, and so the lapse rate decreases during the course of the day. This effect means the lapse rate during the day on Mount Kenya is lower than average for dry air. At night the lapse rate is again lower than average for dry air due to the katabatic winds from the glaciers. The temperature fluctuation is less in the wet season as the constant clouds act as a dampener.

Temperature variations are closely correlated with direct sunlight. The sun quickly warms the ground by a few degrees, which in turn warms the air close to the ground. This air cools to reach equilibrium with the mean air temperature very quickly when the sky becomes overcast. The layer of air within half a metre of the ground in the valleys also exhibit different temperatures at night to the air layer above it. During the clear nights of the dry season, the ground cools quickly cooling the air next to it. This leads to katabatic winds from the ridges into the valleys resulting in the valley bottoms being colder than the higher ridges flanking them. Baker found that the Teleki valley was regularly 2 °C colder at night than the surrounding ridges. This has forced plants such as the senecios and lobelias to be tall to avoid key parts freezing, as freezing is lethal for plants.

=== Precipitation ===
The maximum precipitation on the mountain occurs during the mid-March to June wet season, but the level of precipitation can vary greatly from year to year. During the wet seasons it is overcast almost continually. Half of the annual rainfall is over the long rains March to June, with a third of the total in the October to December short rains wet season. In both the wet and dry seasons the wettest location on the mountain are the south-east slopes. The south-eastern maximum is due to the direction of the predominant winds. The maximum in the west is mainly due to the effects of the sun when the sky is clear, due to anabatic upwelling of air in the valleys bringing cloud up the mountain by the early afternoon. Without this effect this area would be expected to be in a rain shadow.

Above 4,500 metres (14,800 ft) most of the precipitation falls as snow, but as the air is very dry there is not much of this. Therefore, the major source of water in the alpine and nival zones is the nightly frost. This plays a very important role in feeding the glaciers, however there is yet no accurate way to measure the contribution this makes. Lower down, in the dry season, dew every morning has a similar role, and it is estimated that the majority of the small streams are fed in this way.

== Past climate ==
Past climate is interpreted using a number of methods including lake levels, river strength, dune systems, glacial extent and pollen. The further back in time one goes, the broader the signals used become. While the climate can be inferred for a specific location 20,000 years ago, 5 million years ago the climate over most of Africa has to be considered and the results adjusted using current analogies. Problems associated with going back a long time include an uneven distribution of records and a shortage of vegetation fossils due to unfavourable conditions.

Over long time scales, climate is controlled by Milankovitch cycles changing the amount of solar radiation reaching the earth. The weakening and strengthening of the monsoon also plays an important role. Siroco et al. suggest that the strength of the monsoon in linked to the albedo in the Himalaya. Cooler temperatures in the northern hemisphere winter lead to more sunlight reflected off snow and ice and weaker summer monsoons, leading to a drier climate in East Africa. The strength of the monsoon is also linked to Milankovitch cycles with a lag of around 8,000 years. Generally the maximum monsoons occur 2,500 years after a glacial minimum. This maximum corresponds to a minimum of sea surface temperatures.

Since the start of the Quaternary period the northern hemisphere has undergone 21 major ice ages and this signal is also present in East Africa. The past climate of Kenya echos the climatic signal in Europe, entering and leaving cold phases at the same time. During the Last Glacial Maximum, 20,000 years ago, the European Ice Sheet would have diverted the Atlantic weather systems over Kenya. This would have resulted in Kenya having a similar climate to present day Europe. Over the past 6,000 years Mount Kenya has had a series of at least six minor glacial advances as well, with the final maximum at the end of the Little Ice Age in 1900.

The fact that the East African climate was much colder generally can be seen by looking at the other mountains such as Mount Kilimanjaro, Mount Rwenzori and Mount Elgon. They are all isolated pockets of similar alpine ecosystems with similar fauna and flora. This means that this ecosystem must have been widespread at low altitude for it to reach all these mountains. There still must have been pockets of current lowland ecosystem surviving as otherwise animals which are part of these systems would be extinct. An alternate explanation is that given the timescale of millions of years, the probability of tornados transporting flora and fauna between mountains is high.

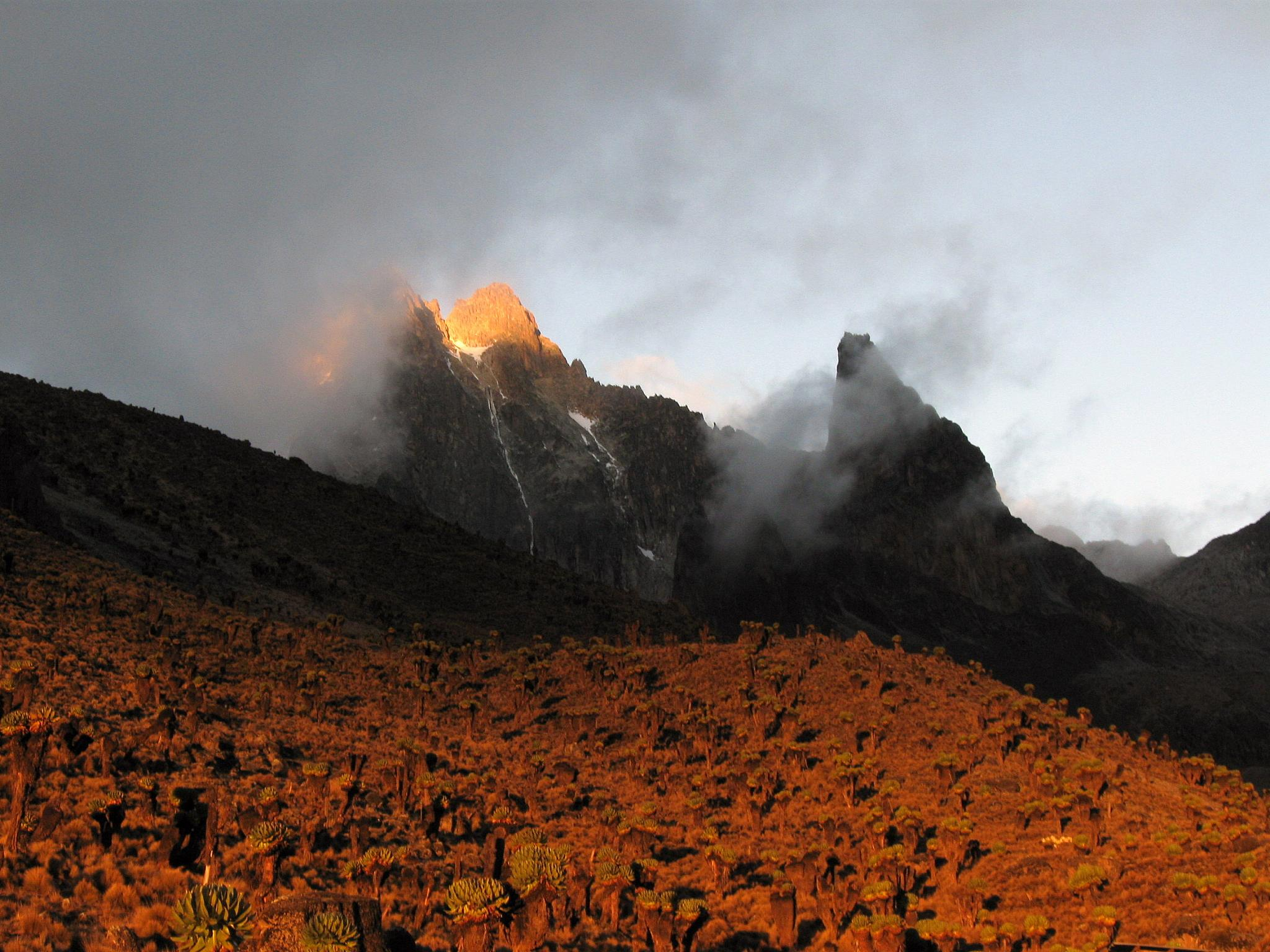
Mount Kenya.jpg

=== Overview ===
Mount Kenya was an active volcano in the Pliocene, 2.5-5 million years ago (mya). 5 mya the Mediterranean Sea was dry and the dunes of the Sahara were much further south; the area that is now Kenya was an arid savanna. By 3.7 mya the climate was much wetter than it is at present, and the broad pattern of vegetation in East Africa established, although there would still be much variation in species and altitudinal distribution due to climatic oscillations. 2.5 mya the first of 21 major ice ages in the Northern Hemisphere during the Quaternary occurred. Tropical Africa experienced much colder temperatures than at present. Ethiopian vegetation belts were lowered and a similar signal would have existed in Kenya. 1 mya drier periods became more pronounced, a trend which loosely continues today.

150 kya was the maximum of the penultimate major glaciation, which was the most extensive of the Pleistocene glaciations. This was followed by the moist Eemian interglacial when temperatures were warmer than present. An arid phase followed, lasting from 100 to 90 kya with dunes building up in Southern Africa, followed by a short but intense cold stage from 75 to 58 kya. Near the end of this cold phase the first Heinrich event (H6) occurred, releasing a mass of ice into the north Atlantic 66 kya. This caused cooler temperatures in the northern hemisphere and a cooler Himalaya which probably resulted in a weakening of the monsoon. A series of Heinrich events followed, with an associated drying of the East African climate at 50, 35, 30, 24, 16 and culminating with the Younger Dryas period 12kya.

31-21 kya was a cool dry phase, with vegetation belts lowering. Upper montane forest species occurred where presently lower montane forest species are and there is evidence that montane forest was widespread at lower altitudes. The record from the Congo Basin agrees with this but Lowe and Walker suggest that East Africa was moister than present. This discrepancy may possibly be explained by the difference in location for problems with calibrating the dates.

The Last Glacial Maximum (LGM) occurred 23–14.5 kya with a very arid phase in Africa when desert extended hundreds of kilometres (miles) further south than present. Temperatures were 5-6 °C cooler than present and there was a general rain forest retreat. The summer monsoon during the LGM was very weak. Glacial moraines from near the end of the LGM in East Africa show that the south-easterly monsoon was less wet during the LGM than the current dry north-easterly monsoon. Stratus clouds may have been extensive resulting in a cooling effect but little rain.

By 13.8 kya the climate had moistened and montane forest was again spreading after a minimum during the LGM. The monsoon strengthened again, and lake levels and river activity in East Africa increased. High altitude vegetation was mainly limited by temperatures and not drought, again implying a wet climate.

Before the Younger Dryas temperatures were similar to present but the forest cover incomplete. During the younger Dryas 12.9–11.5 kya brought about by the last Heinrich event, there was a pronounced weakening of the summer monsoon over East Africa, and montane forest retreated and East African lake levels fell. Forests reached the same range and density as present day after the younger Dryas when the climate again became moister.

For the next five thousand years, from 10-5 kya, the climate was generally moister than present but oscillations were still present. The monsoon was strong, but there were centuries long weaker periods. leasing to a drier phase, but conditions were still moister than present.

After 5 kya the monsoon began to gradually weaken and the East African climate became similar to present day, but slightly colder and drier. The lake levels in Ethiopia were low from 5.4 to 2.5 kya as well as in Ghana 4.5–3.2 kya. During these last five thousand years, Mount Kenya went through a series of minor glacial advances. There was a temperature minimum over 3.7-2.5 kya and also during the little ice age spanning the years 1300-1900 when a permafrost regime dominated on Mount Kenya.

=== Glaciations ===
Mount Kenya used to be covered in an ice cap, which eroded the mountain to expose the volcanic plugs which form the current summit. This would have been caused by a cooler climate and the fact that the mountain reached an altitude of between 5,000 metres (16,404 ft)-6,500 metres (21,300 ft) resulting in colder temperatures. Since then the mountain has undergone a number of glaciations, but only the more recent one can be chronologically complete due to each new glaciation eroding the moraines of the previous ones, if the glaciers advance over them.

Glaciations in East Africa are associated with a colder, drier climate when the precipitation is less, but the extra temperature drop means any solid precipitation stays. Stratus cloud, which probably dominated during some of the glaciations would have provided insulation but little precipitation.

There are minor glacial advances recorded on the mountain over the past 6,000 years. The first of these occurred between 6950 and 4500 kya when there was a major glacial advance in the Teleki valley. A moraine in the Hobley valley dates slightly before this. 5.7 kya the Cesar and Josef glaciers retreated from the Hausberg Tarn for the final time. This tarn has since been used to infer past climates by looking at the sediment record.

A series of retreat and advance followed, with glacial maxima at: 5700, 4900, 4700, between 4300 and 4200, 4000, 3100, 2800, 1900, 1200, 600, 400 and 50 ya. (Note the year ago scale takes 1950 to be year 0.) The glaciers which existed between 2.8 and 2.3 kya would have been cold based due to cold temperates at the time and so frozen to the bed and therefore not eroding. In 1900, when Mackinder visited the mountain, the glaciers were close to their little ice age terminal moraines.

These glacial advances loosely correlate to minima in the level of Lake Turkana around 4800, 4200, 3700, 3500, 3000, 2500, 2500, 2000 and 1600-1400 ya. As glaciers would have advanced during the dry phases when the temperature was cooler, it is not known why the correlation is not better, but it could be due to inaccuracies in dating.

Since 1900 the glaciers have been steadily retreating and seven out of 18 have disappeared.

=== Palaeobotany ===
Palaeobotany relies on the fact that each ecosystem is characterised by certain plants, which in turn act as a proxy for climate by knowing which modern habitats they occur in. A lake core taken from Sacred Lake at 2,400 metres (7,900 ft) on the mountain, traces the warming of the climate by studying pollen found in the core. The depth of the core can be calibrated with an age by using carbon-14 dating techniques assuming a constant sedimentation rate. The 13.4 metres (44 ft) Sacred Lake core is estimated to go back 18,600 years. The core shows an abrupt jump of pollen specimens at 11,000 years, corresponding with the Younger Dryas stadial in Europe. At this time the African redwood, Hagenia, pollen appeared. This tree is closely associated with the upper edge of Afro-timberline forests. Before this the moorland grasses and heather species dominated the core. Following the introduction of Hagenia, other tree species started appearing until the lake was situated in full montane forest at 5,000 years before present. This corresponds to an 8 °C warming since the start of the core. 18,000 years ago the lake was in the habitat now located at 3,400 metres (11,200 ft) on Mount Kenya, 1,000 metres (3,300 ft) higher than the lake. An important point is that this research only applies directly to one site on the mountain. This work shows that changes in the Kenyan climate occur at the same time as in Europe.

An alternate explanation to the change in pollen is that the climate became less moist, but the temperatures did not change as much as suggested.

== See also ==
- Mount Kenya
- Mount Kenya National Park
- Natural history of Mount Kenya
