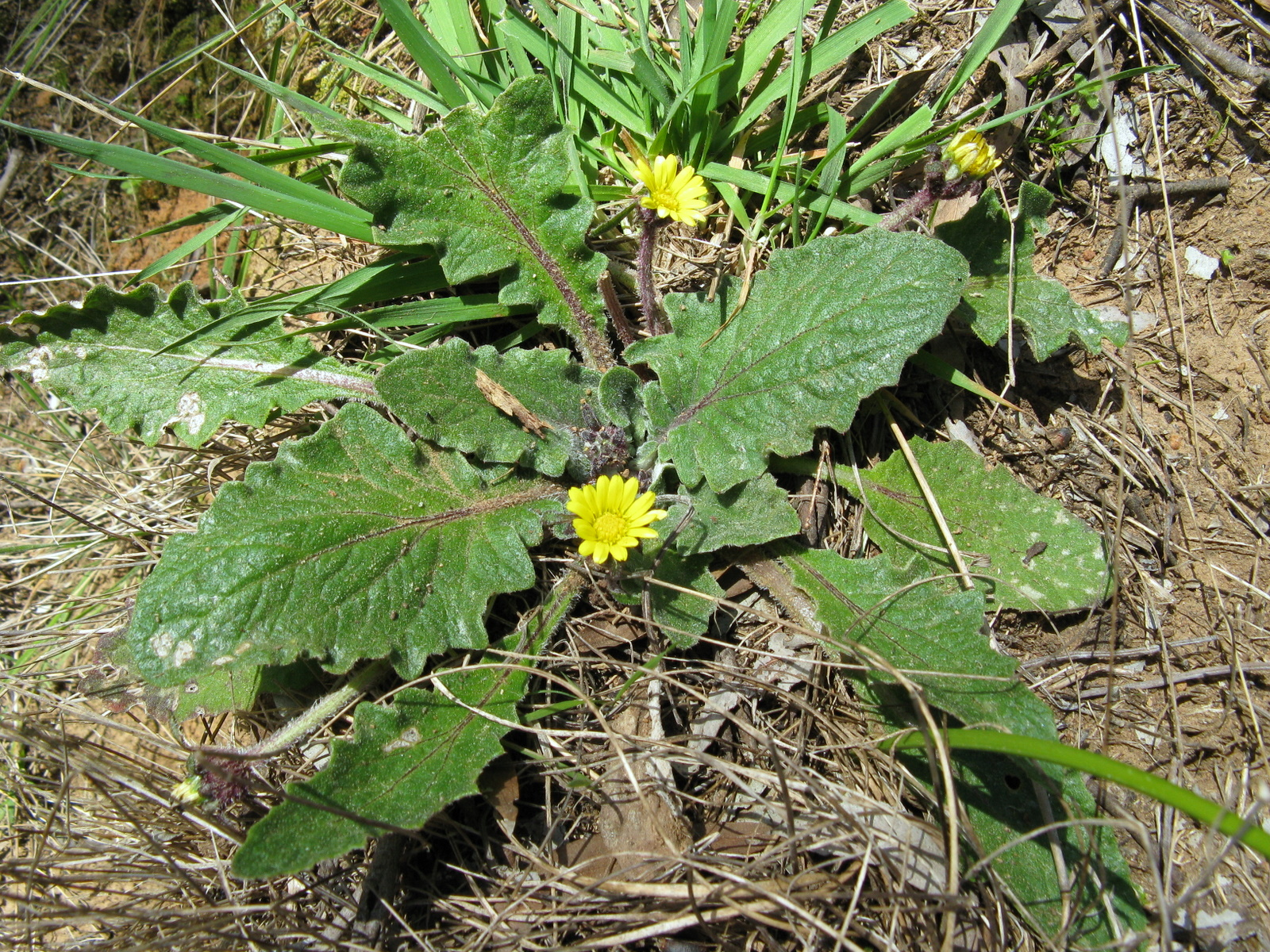

Scientific classification
- Kingdom: Plantae
- Clade: Tracheophytes
- Clade: Angiosperms
- Clade: Eudicots
- Clade: Asterids
- Order: Asterales
- Family: Asteraceae
- Genus: Cymbonotus
- Species: C. preissianus

Binomial name
- Cymbonotus preissianus Steetz

= Cymbonotus preissianus =

Austral bears ear

Species of flowering plant

Cymbonotus preissianus, commonly known as Austral bears ear, is an Australian species of small shrub in the family Asteraceae. A perennial herbaceous plant without stems, to 30 cm in diameter. Yellow flowers form from August to March. The habitat is woodland and sclerophyll forest, usually associated with disturbed areas, leaf litter and drainage lines. The type specimen was collected by Ludwig Preiss and the plant was described in 1845 by the German botanist Joachim Steetz.
