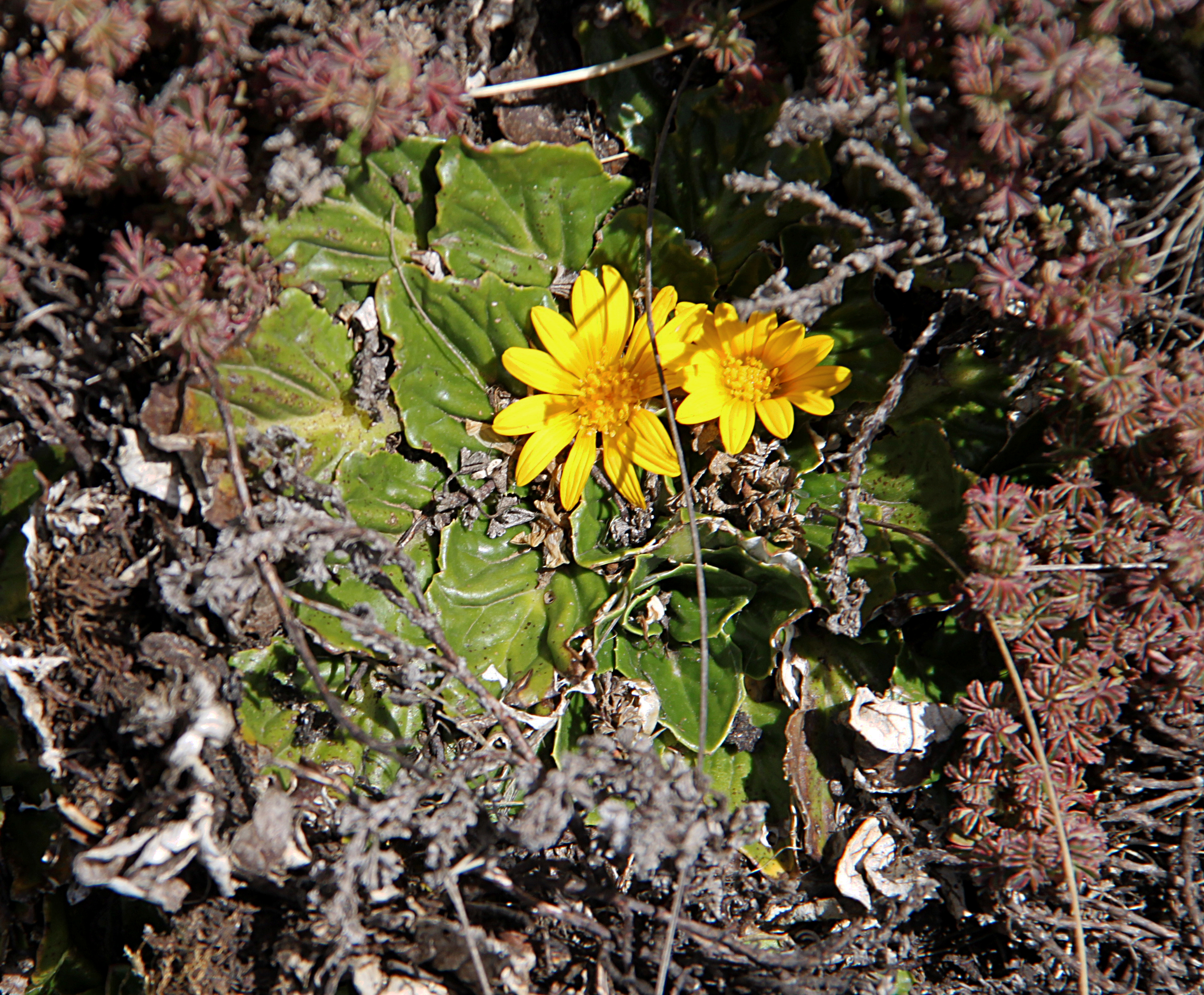
- Haplocarpha rueppelii at the centre

Scientific classification
- Kingdom: Plantae
- Clade: Tracheophytes
- Clade: Angiosperms
- Clade: Eudicots
- Clade: Asterids
- Order: Asterales
- Family: Asteraceae
- Genus: Haplocarpha
- Species: H. rueppelii

Binomial name
- Haplocarpha rueppelii (Sch.Bip.) Beauverd

Synonyms
- Schnittspahnia rueppellii, Landtia rueppellii, Arctotis rueppellii; Arctotis pygmaea, Anemonospermos pygmaea; Landtia lobulata; Landtia kilimandjarica

= Haplocarpha rueppelii =

Species of flowering plant

Haplocarpha rueppelii is a very low to low (1–8 cm high) perennial plant with a ground rosette of entire leaves and short-stemmed, yellow flowerheads, that contain both ray and disc florets, and is assigned to the family Asteraceae. The species is an endemic of the highlands of Ethiopia and eastern Africa.

== Description ==
Haplocarpha rueppelii is a creeping perennial plant that can grow into dense mats.

=== Roots, stems and leaves ===
There are many thick, almost tuberous roots, emerging from a rootstock of 1–2 cm in diameter creeping at the soil surface. The shiny, somewhat fleshy green leaves have a short leaf stalk that may have spiderweb-like hairs at their base. The leaf blade varies between almost round, ovate, or longish, diamond or inverted egg-shaped, 2–13 cm long, 1–7.5 cm wide, with the base gradually narrowing, rounded or hart-shaped, the margin entire to scalloped, with shallow irregular teeth, saw-shaped or almost lobed, the leaf tip pointy, blunt or rounded and the teeth may be ending in a soft spine. The upper leaf surface with few or may hairs or even hairy like a spiderweb, the lower leaf surface with densely felty beneath with spiderweb hairs.

=== Inflorescences ===
The stalk of the flowerhead is pinkish in color, somewhat flattened, with shallow wings, 1–11 cm long, widest at the clasping base, up to 8 mm wide. Usually every rosette carries several slender, felty, pinkish, leafless, erect scapes of up to 13 cm, sometimes swollen beneath the single flower head. Each flowerhead is 1.5–5 cm in diameter. The involucre consists of two or three, sometimes four whorls of linear to narrowly ovate or inverted egg-shaped bracts, each 4–12 mm long and 1–3 mm wide, with papery margins, covered with many of few hairs. The common base of the florets (called receptacle) is 3–4 mm across, has the shape of a shallow, slightly hollowed dome, which may or may not carry a scale at the foot of each floret.

=== Florets ===
Along the outside are eight to sixteen spreading yellow ray florets, which are ovate, elliptic or egg-shaped, although about one eighth is tube-shaped. Each ray floret is 1–2.5 cm long, 2–6 mm wide, entire or sometimes with mostly one to three teeth at the tip and mostly four or five veins, hairless or with scattered multicellular hairs on the lower surface. In the centre of the flowerhead are mostly between twenty and forty (sometimes as few as eleven) yellow and urn-shaped disk florets, of 3.5–7 mm long, which divide into five triangular lobes, one third of the length of the floret, that spread or bend down, and do not have hair.

=== Fruits and seeds ===
The one-seeded indehiscent fruits are not embedded in the common base of the florets receptacle, is inverted cone-shaped or oblong, has three or four ribs, is at least 3 mm long, and half as wide, with a smooth surface or with tiny wrinkles and hairless. At the tip is one row of scales (the pappus) of 0.5–1 mm long, that are free in the outer florets, but merged at their foot in disc florets. These scales are split into twelve to fifteen standing, awl-shaped lobes, with a long, narrow tip, divided in side-lobes and without hair.

=== Variability ===
The upper leaf surface of plants of Haplocarpha rueppelii growing on Mount Elgon are consistently densely covered in multicellular hairs. Elsewhere, hairiness varies between specimens in the same population. Scholars therefore are reluctant to assign the form from Mount Elgon to a variety different from the typical form.

== Taxonomy ==
In 1848 Carl Heinrich "Bipontinus" Schultz described Schnittspahnia rueppelii, which he assigned to the Annonaceae, based on a specimen that was collected by Eduard Rüppell and Georg Wilhelm Schimper, from high elevations in the Semien Mountains in Ethiopia, and now reside in the Kew Herbarium. Georg Carl Wilhelm Vatke realised this plant belonged to the Asteraceae, and renamed it to Landtia rueppelii in 1875. Karl August Otto Hoffmann thought the species should be assigned to the genus Arctotis, creating the new combination A. rueppelii in 1895. A plant collected by Ernest Edward Galpin on Mount Kinangop in the southern Aberdare Range of Kenya, and also kept at Kew, was regarded different enough by the very young John Hutchinson, who named it Landtia lobulata in 1914. Gustave Beauverd merged the genus Landtia with Haplocarpha, and created the new combination H. rueppelii in 1915. Later, in 1930, Hutchinson and Marion Beatrice Moss described a plant collected by Arthur Disbrowe Cotton on Mount Kilimanjaro, since stored at Kew, naming it Landtia kilimanjarica. All of these names are now regarded synonymous.

=== Phylogeny ===
Comparison of DNA of species assigned to the subtribe Arctotidinae has cast doubt on the monophyly of the genus Haplocarpha. The type species, H. lanata, seems most related to H. lyrata and Arctoteca calundula. H. rueppelii and H. nervosa on the other hand appear to be the first branch to split from the remaining species in the subtribe. If this finding is robust, reinstatement of Landtia has been suggested, meaning our species would have to be called Landtia rueppelii.

== Distribution ==
In Kenya H. rueppelii can for instance be found at Mount Elgon, in Mau Forest, on Mount Kenya. In Tanzania it can be found at the Kilimanjaro complex, such as on the Shira Plateau. In Ethiopia it has been registered in the Bale Mountains. The plant also may occur elsewhere in highlands in Ethiopia, eastern Africa and possibly South Africa.

== Habitat and ecology ==
In Dodola Forest, at the north flank of the Bale Mountains, Ethiopia, H. rueppellii occurs in several different plant communities, obviously with different other species. In the Hagenia abyssinica-Hypericum revolutum-community it occurs with Alchemilla abyssinica, A. fischerii, Asparagus africanus, Crepis rueppellii, Cynoglossum caeruleum, Euphorbia schimperii, Hydrocotyle mannii, Kalanchoe petitiana and Satureja paradoxa in the herbaceous layer. This species grows at an altitude of 2250–4650 m.
