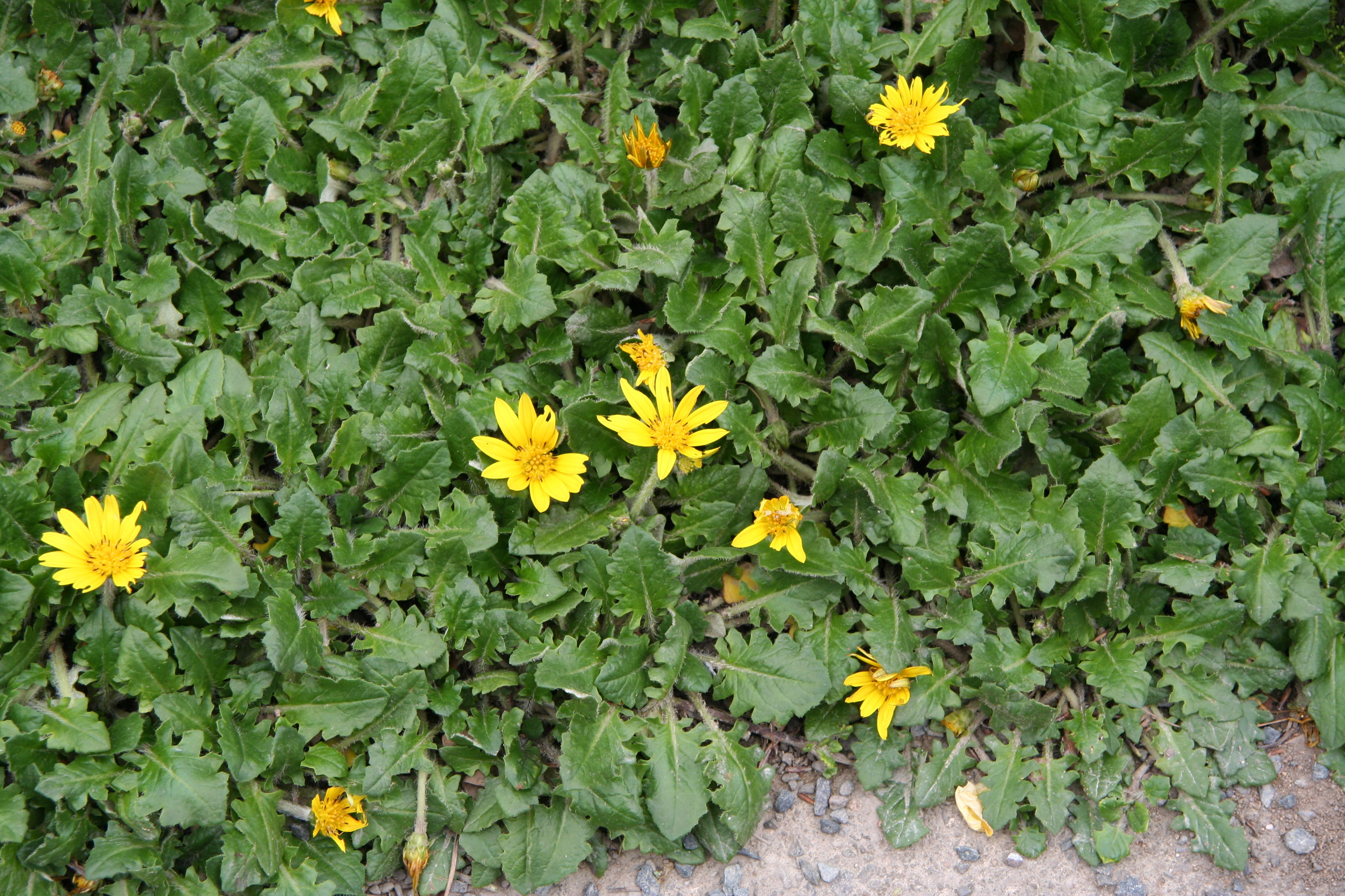
- Haplocarpha cheilanthifolia

Scientific classification
- Kingdom: Plantae
- Clade: Tracheophytes
- Clade: Angiosperms
- Clade: Eudicots
- Clade: Asterids
- Order: Asterales
- Family: Asteraceae
- Subfamily: Vernonioideae
- Tribe: Arctotideae
- Subtribe: Arctotidinae
- Genus: Haplocarpha; Less.

Type species
- Haplocarpha lanata (Thunberg) Less.

Synonyms
- Landtia Less.

= Haplocarpha =

Genus of flowering plants

Haplocarpha (onefruit) is a genus of African flowering plants in the family Asteraceae.

Species

- Haplocarpha hastata Lewin - Ethiopia
- Haplocarpha lanata (Thunb.) Less. - South Africa
- Haplocarpha lyrata Harv. - South Africa
- Haplocarpha nervosa (Thunb.) Beauverd - South Africa
- Haplocarpha oocephala (DC.) Beyers - South Africa
- Haplocarpha parvifolia (Schltr.) Beauverd - South Africa
- Haplocarpha pudica Beauverd - South Africa
- Haplocarpha rueppelii (Sch.Bip.) Beauverd - Ethiopia and eastern Africa
- Haplocarpha schimperi (Sch.Bip.) Beauverd - Ethiopia
- Haplocarpha thunbergii Less. - Tanzania
